= New Course Policy =

Strategy in Croatian politics (1903–1907)

- Location: Croatia-Slavonia and Dalmatia
- Type: Political strategy
- Cause: Fragmentation and limited autonomy of Croatian lands, fear of germanisation
- Organized by: Frano Supilo, Ante Trumbić
- Outcome: Establishment of the Croat-Serb Coalition; Failure of the policy; Croat-Serb Coalition replaces the People's Party as the government-allied party

The New Course Policy (Croatian: politika novoga kursa) was a political strategy developed in the early 1900s by Frano Supilo and Ante Trumbić of the Dalmatian Party of Rights organisation. The objectives of the strategy were variously perceived. At the minimum, the New Course Policy was meant to achieve the unification of Croatia-Slavonia and Dalmatia – two realms of Austria-Hungary administered, respectively, under the Hungarian and Austrian realms of the Empire as determined by the Austro-Hungarian Compromise of 1867. At the most, it was hoped that the strategy would lead to greater autonomy of unified Croatian lands within Austria-Hungary or to the political independence of Croatia.

Implementation of the New Course Policy required a departure from the provisions of the Compromise. In 1903, Supilo and Trumbić saw an opportunity to challenge the existing constitution and achieve an objective of their political strategy in an emerging dispute between Austria and Hungary regarding the Hungarian opposition's demands for greater autonomy. To that end, Supilo proposed the Croatian opposition should give support to Hungary's anti-dualist Party of Independence and '48 in return for Hungarian support for the addition of Dalmatia to Croatia-Slavonia. In October 1905, most Croatian parliamentary parties accepted the strategy while Croatian Serb parliamentary parties gave their support through the Rijeka Resolution and Zadar Resolution, respectively. The New Course Policy also served as a plaform for establishment of the Croat-Serb Coalition that ousted the pro-Hungarian People's Party from power in Croatia-Slavonia in the 1906 election.

Shortly before the election, the Sándor Wekerle-led coalition government was established in Hungary, ending the Austro-Hungarian constitutional dispute and eliminating the motivation for Hungarian support for the objectives of the New Course Policy. Any possibility of cooperation between the Croat-Serb Coalition and the Hungarian government disappeared after adoption of the contentious Railroad Pragmatic in 1907, thus ending the New Course Policy.

== Background ==
=== Political landscape ===
Austria–Hungary
Kingdoms and countries of Austria–Hungary:
Cisleithania (Empire of Austria): 1. Bohemia, 2. Bukovina, 3. Carinthia, 4. Carniola, 5. Dalmatia, 6. Galicia, 7. Küstenland, 8. Lower Austria, 9. Moravia, 10. Salzburg, 11. Silesia, 12. Styria, 13. Tyrol, 14. Upper Austria, 15. Vorarlberg;
Transleithania (Kingdom of Hungary): 16. Hungary proper 17. Croatia-Slavonia;
Austro-Hungarian condominium: 18. Bosnia and Herzegovina

In the late 19th century, the politics of the Kingdom of Croatia-Slavonia, a realm of Austria-Hungary at the time, were dominated by the outcomes of the Austro-Hungarian Compromise of 1867 and the Croatian–Hungarian Settlement of 1868. The former divided the Croatian lands (Note: In the context of the Habsburg Monarchy, the term Croatian lands normally refers to the kingdoms of Croatia-Slavonia and Dalmatia, as well as Istria, the city of Rijeka, and Međimurje. These areas largely corresponded to the so-called Triune Kingdom. Founders of the Party of Rights defined the Croatian lands in vague terms since 1860s. Eugen Kvaternik described it as the area bounded by the Alps, the Danube and Drina rivers, and Albania. Ante Starčević spoke of an even wider area, extending beyond Drina – to the Timok River.) between the Austrian- and Hungarian-ruled halves of the empire. Dalmatia and Istria were ruled from Vienna, while Croatia-Slavonia was a part of the Arch-Kingdom of Hungary. The Croatian–Hungarian Settlement upheld, but also curbed, Croatian political autonomy, restricting it to governing its internal affairs. In Hungary, regardless of the guarantees regarding Croatian autonomy, the Settlement was viewed as a step towards full integration of Croatia into the Hungarian state, and the Hungarian government's policies threatened Croatian autonomy. As the Hungarian position became better known, the Croats increasingly opposed the Settlement. The Party of Rights became a leading critic of the constitutional arrangement. The unicameral Sabor was authorised to legislate the matters within the scope of Croatia's autonomy. The Sabor was elected, but the electoral laws limited suffrage by means of property qualification to about 2% of the population. The Ban of Croatia, as the head of the executive, was appointed by the Emperor, in consultation with the Prime Minister of Hungary. The appointment guaranteed Hungarian control over Croatia's nominal autonomy. The People's Party (Narodna stranka) allied itself with the Hungarian government, while the Party of Rights and the Independent People's Party (Neodvisna narodna stranka, NNS) formed the opposition, relying on a middle-class that was a minority of the population.

=== Croat–Serb relations ===
In the same period, Hungary's gradually infringing on Croatia's autonomy was resented, leading to anti-Hungarian protests. In response, the Hungarian government imposed martial law in Croatia-Slavonia and shortly afterwards appointed Károly Khuen-Héderváry as Ban of Croatia. Seeking to weaken the opposition, Khuen-Héderváry applied a divide and rule policy by fostering conflict between Croats and Croatian Serbs through a series of concessions to the latter. In the process, the policy relied on the Serbs' fear of the Croatian nationalism championed by the Party of Rights. (Note: Ante Starčević argued that states form "citizens' states" in which all citizens are equal and the definition of a nation does not rely on ethnic or religious criteria. Building on his idea that the existence of a state can create its associated nation devoid of ethnic and religious criteria, he claimed that there are no other peoples in Croatia other than Croats. This created a conflict between Croatian nationalism and Serbian nationalism, as the latter advocated popular sovereignty which would erase borders of previously existing polities with the aim of uniting all Serbs in a single state, including the Serbs of Croatia.) Khuen-Héderváry's policy strengthened both anti-Serb Croatian and anti-Croat Serbian nationalisms. The low point of Croat–Serb relations was reached after the Serb Independent Party (Srpska samostalna stranka, SSS) organ Srbobran published an inflammatory article. The conflict escalated into riots targeting Serb businesses and homes in Zagreb in September 1902. The riots resulted in a change to the SSS leadership where Svetozar Pribićević took control.

=== Regrouping of the opposition ===
The Party of Rights and the NNS published a joint opposition programme in 1894. For the Party of Rights, it marked a departure from the original teachings of the party founder Ante Starčević. Namely, the original objective of the party was independence of Croatia from the Habsburg Monarchy – and the objective could not be announced as it was deemed treasonous. The 1894 programme called for unification of the Croatian lands and giving Croatia an equal constitutional position within Austria-Hungary, referred to as the trialist reform. During the negotiations with the NNS, the majority faction of the Party of Rights, led by Fran Folnegović, adopted some elements of Yugoslavist ideology as an acceptable means of political struggle. In 1895, a minority faction of the Party of Rights, known as the Frankists after its leader Josip Frank, split from the party following Frank's defeat in internal elections for control of the party's Sabor delegation and of the party's central committee. The central committee consisted of the leading party figures and coordinated the work of the Party of Rights in Croatia-Slavonia and in Dalmatia, as well as politicians outside the party membership active in other territories. In 1897, the Party of Rights and the NNS formed the United Opposition coalition ahead of the 1897 election. In 1902, the two fused into the United Opposition party. The new party was later renamed the Croatian Party of Rights (Hrvatska stranka prava, HSP) in 1903.

In 1903, Progressive Youth, supported by a small number of individual opposition politicians, organized a series of public assemblies to rally supporters for the improvement of Croatia-Slavonia's constitutional position, in what became known as the Croatian National Movement of 1903. The movement did not lead to constitutional changes, but it reinforced the appeal of the idea of unifying Croatia-Slavonia and Dalmatia, and to a large extent it dispelled the perception that the House of Habsburg-Lorraine was benevolent toward Croatia's interests.

== Formulation ==
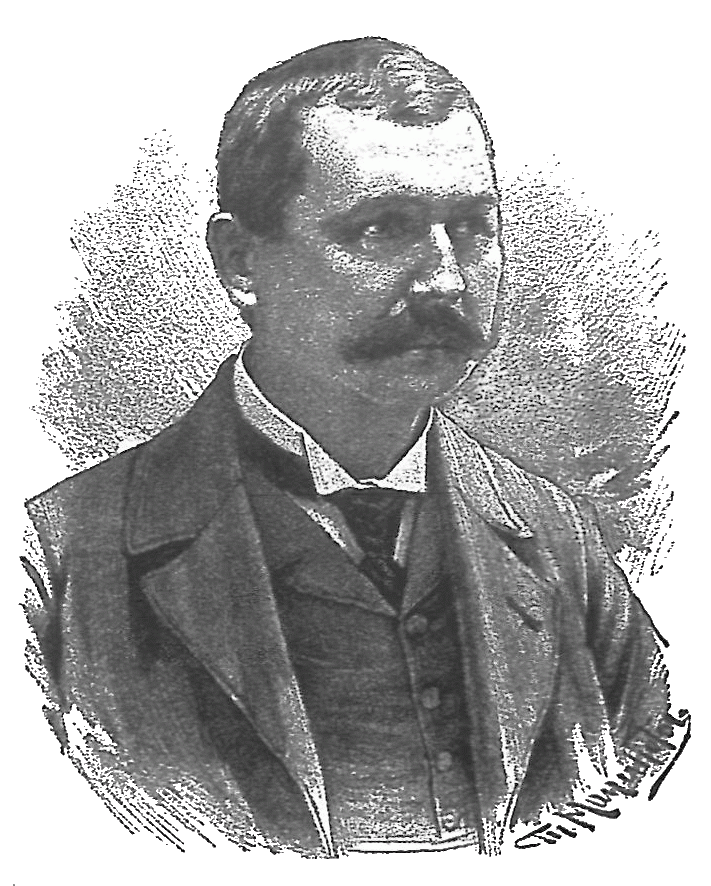
Frano Supilo proposed the New Course Policy in 1903.

Khuen-Héderváry's policies caused widespread radicalisation and desire to change the constitutional relationships in Croatia-Slavonia and beyond. In the early 1900s, the appointment of Ernest von Koerber as the prime minister of the Austrian part of the Empire further radicalised Croatian nationalism in Vienna-ruled Dalmatia. This was the result of his government's attempts to favour the use of the German language in Dalmatia and to favour Italian interests. (Note: In 1891, Austria-Hungary and Italy concluded an agreement on import of Italian wine at low prices. Before it was rescinded in 1904, the agreement contributed to decline of winemaking in Dalmatia (and Istria). Regional winemaking grew rapidly from 1850s when Italy started importing Dalmatian wine to offset loss of production due to the disease caused by powdery mildew. France imported wine from Dalmatia to offset losses in its production due to the phylloxera infestation from early 1860s to early 1890s. To meet the demand, areas previously used to grow cereal or olives were repurposed as vineyards encompassing more than a half of the total agricultural land. In 1894, phylloxera infested the Dalmatian vineyards, collapsing production that was already hurt by the trade agreement. Loss of livelihood caused large-scale emigration from Dalmatia.) In those circumstances, Ante Trumbić and Frano Supilo, as prominent figures of the Dalmatian organisaton of the HSP, saw von Koerber's policies as a part of the German expansionist Drang nach Osten threatening Croatian interests. Supilo viewed the German expansionism as the greatest threat to the existence of the South Slavs.

In response, Supilo and Trumbić developed a strategy to defend against germanisation through unification of the Croatian lands as a fully soveregin state. Their approach relied on ideas put forward by the Illyrian movement as well as drawing on Yugoslavism and neo-Slavism. Supilo did not think that creation of a common South Slavic state was feasible, but he was convinced that the Croats were more likely to achieve their political goals through joint action with fellow South Slavs. In particular, he thought cooperation with the Serbs indispensable. The approach was a departure from the traditional pro-Austrian stance of Croatian nationalism in the 19th century.

In 1903, Trumbić and Supilo saw an emerging dispute between Austria and Hungary regarding Hungarian demands for partition of the Common Army, a separate Hungarian customs area, and a Hungarian national bank, as an opportunity to challenge the dualist constitution of Austria-Hungary and achieve unification of Croatia-Slavonia and Dalmatia. Trumbić presented his and Supilo's idea in a speech at the Diet of Dalmatia on 7 November 1903, advocating support for Hungary's anti-dualist Party of Independence and '48 (Függetlenségi és 48-as Párt, F48P) in return for Hungarian support for the addition of Dalmatia to Croatia-Slavonia despite the dualist constitution. Trumbić and Supilo named the initiative the New Course Policy (Politika novoga kursa). The policy was never elaborated in detail. It provided that Croatian political parties would cooperate with non-Croatian parties to achieve unification of Croatia-Slavonia and Dalmatia and attain economic and political autonomy of Croatia within the Empire. The policy was devised purely as a Croatian political strategy. It was not meant as a platform for reconciliation between Croats and Serbs. Supilo and Trumbić were convinced that Vienna's lack of support for the Croatian National Movement in 1903, and the economic abandonment of Dalmatia, would be sufficient to gain the support of Croatia's political parties for their ideas; but none of the parties initially supported the New Course Policy.

== Adoption ==
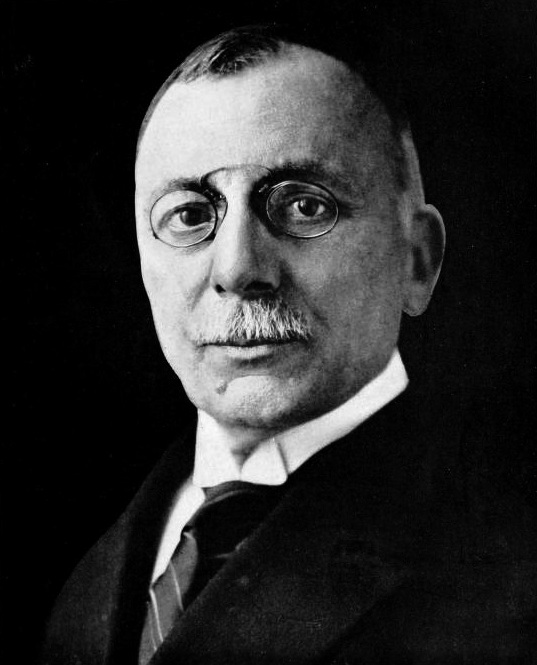
Ante Trumbić co-authored the New Course Policy.

The New Course Policy was met with scepticism in Croatia-Slavonia. The first support came in 1904 from the Ivan Lorković-led Progressive Youth, a group of relatively minor importance. Lorković thought the initiative would be a platform for cooperation with Croatian Serb politicians. For this purpose the Progressive Youth developed the concept of National Oneness. It was meant as an expression of the notion that the South Slavs belong to a single "race", were of "one blood", and had one shared language. Lorković offered the SSS cooperation, asking for acknowledgement that Croatian Serbs' interests coincided with Croatian interests. He further proposed that, for the sake of cooperation, the conflicting territorial claims regarding Austria-Hungary-occupied Bosnia and Herzegovina made by Croat and Serb nationalists be temporarily set aside. In December 1904, the Progressive Youth members transformed the organisation into the Croatian Progressive Party, hoping to attract more popular support for the party's programme calling for financial independence of Croatia from Hungary and political cooperation with the Croatian Serbs.

A further consolidation of the opposition took place in April 1905 when the Dalmatian Party of Rights merged with the People's Croatian Party into the Croatian Party. The HSP invited the newly formed party's leaders to Zagreb, to issue a joint statement condemning Hungarian policies. Trumbić declined the invitation. August Harambašić turned out to be the greatest supporter of the New Course Policy among the HSP's ranks, successfully lobbying the party to accept the policy. According to Supilo, Grga Tuškan and Bogoslav Mažuranić helped push through the New Course Policy. Regardless, the ultimate objective of the coalition was poorly defined and various participants had different expectations ranging from unification of Croatian lands with the Croatian–Hungarian Settlement in place as the minimum, to greater or complete financial autonomy of Croatia, or even political independence of Croatia.

Supilo and Trumbić approached the Ferenc Kossuth-led F48P after it won the 1905 Hungarian parliamentary election, offering Croatian support in confrontations with Vienna as well as a unified Croatia within the Hungarian portion of the Empire in return for unification of the Croatian lands and their true autonomy. Next, Supilo visited Belgrade, seeking and receiving support from the Kingdom of Serbia. Namely, following the 1903 coup, the new Serbian government sought ways to curb Austro-Hungarian economic influence over Serbia. Concluding that the Kossuth's demand for a separate Hungarian customs area helped its cause, Serbia's immediate objective of allying with Kossuth coincided with a goal pursued by Supilo and Trumbić. In turn, Serbia helped convince the Serb People's Radical Party (SNRS) to cooperate with the SSS and support the New Course Policy. The SNRS supported Supilo and Trumbić in order to achieve an alliance with Kossuth in Hungary, while the SSS wanted to establish a more prominent role in Croatian politics and thereby gain advantage over the rival SNRS. The Serb contribution to the New Course Policy was minimal and non-essential for implementation of the policy itself.

Following a preparatory meeting held in Opatija in September, Trumbić called the opposition parties sitting in the Croatian Sabor and the Diet of Dalmatia to send representatives to Rijeka for a conference held on 2 and 3 October 1905. The Frankists would not attend because they disagreed with Trumbić and Supilo. Since no Serb party held seats in the Croatian Sabor at the time, none were invited; and the sole Serb party in the Diet of Dalmatia refused to attend in protest. This reduced the field to the HSP and the Croatian Party. Those present adopted the Rijeka Resolution endorsing the New Course Policy – supporting Kossuth and omitting any mention of Serbs or National Oneness. On 17 October, the SSS, joined by the representatives of the Serb People's Party and the SNRS, adopted the Zadar Resolution. The document supported the Rijeka Resolution and offered support under the condition of recognition of equality of the Serbian and Croatian nations. Rijeka and the Zadar Resolution marked the formal acceptance of the New Course Policy by the Croatian opposition.

Rejecting the New Course Policy, Frank said that the Frankists did not believe the new Hungarian ruling party would accept any different approach to Croatia than their predecessors, the Liberal Party. This was echoed by Serb liberal politician Mihailo Polit-Desančić, who pointed out that there was no sign of Hungarian agreement with the New Course Policy objectives or any reason to trust the new rulers of Hungary. Frank's further complaint against the policy and the Rijeka Resolution was that they created a Croat–Serb alliance. (Note: The nascent Croatian Peasant Party that will become the leading political party among Croats within fifteen years, namely its founders, brothers Antun and Stjepan Radić, also campaigned against the New Course Policy in 1905.)

== Implementation and failure ==
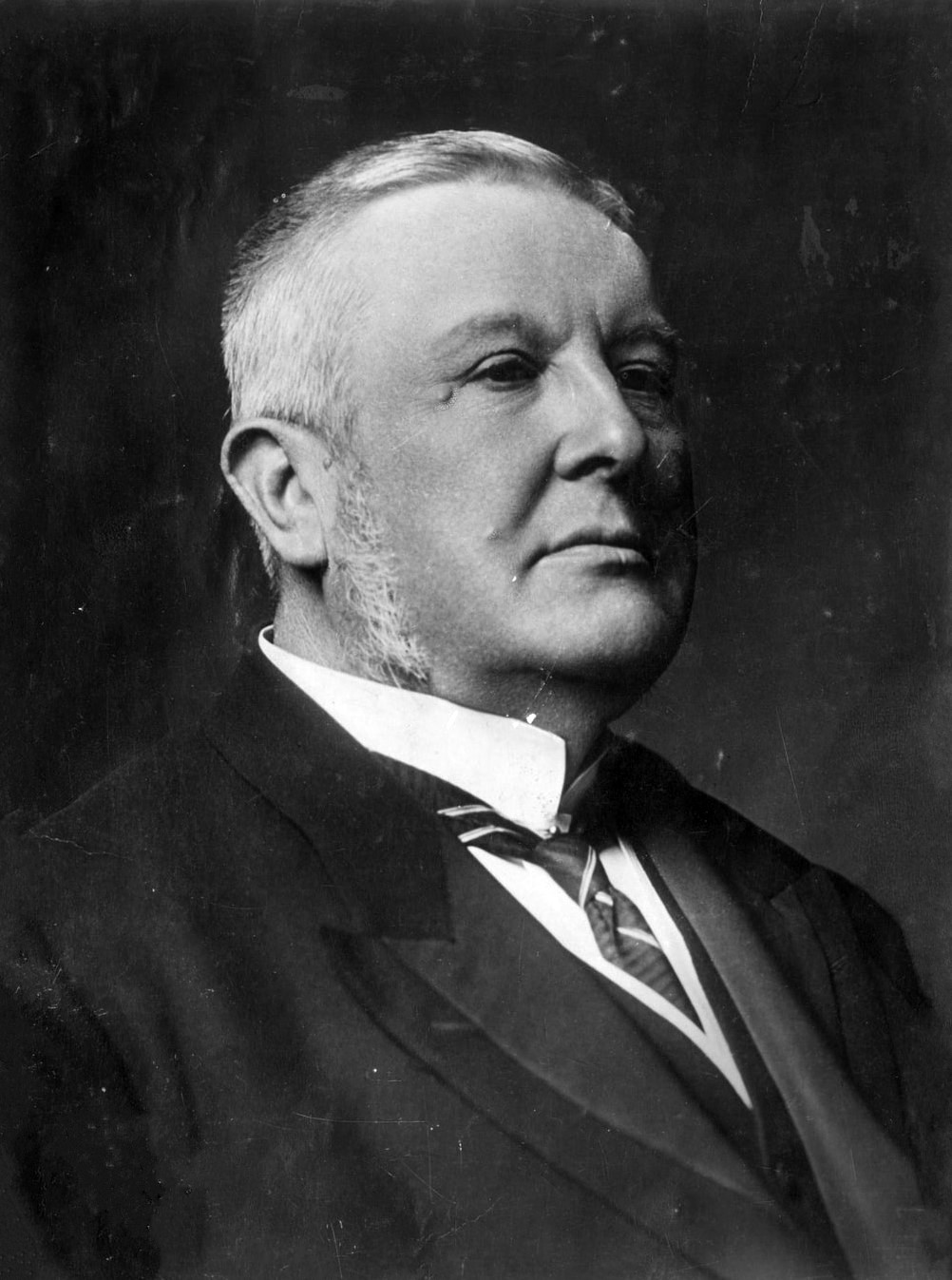
Introduction of the Railroad Pragmatic bill by the government of Sándor Wekerle (pictured) marked the end of the New Course Policy.

On the basis of the New Course Policy, the HSP, the SSS, the SNRS, and the Croatian Progressive Party formed the Croat-Serb Coalition (Hrvatsko-srpska koalicija, HSK) on 14 December 1905. Supilo assumed the leading role in the HSK. The Social Democratic Party of Croatia and Slavonia and independent Franko Potočnjak also joined the coalition at its inception. In May 1906, the coalition stood in the Croatian parliamentary election and won 31 seats out of 88. (Note: The 31 seats won by the Croat-Serb Coalition consisted of 20 won by the Croatian Party of Rights, six that went to the Serb Independent Party, two won by the Serb People's Radical Party and three non-partisan candidates – Vladimir Nikolić Podrinski, Miroslav Kulmer, and Franko Potočnjak.) The previously ruling People's Party won a plurality of 38 seats while the Frankists took 19. Failing to command a majority, the People's Party disbanded and left the HSK to rule. Regardless of the electoral loss, a number of prominent figures of the People's Party retained their positions, such as Ban Teodor Pejačević, who had replaced Khuen-Héderváry in 1903. This was necessary because the HSK did not have enough capable candidates to fill various government posts, and the appointment of the Ban of Croatia and his ministers required imperial assent given in consultation with the Hungarian prime minister.

In April 1906, shortly before the Croatian parliamentary election, a new Hungarian coalition government led by Sándor Wekerle, and composed of the Liberal Party and the F48P, came to power. It was a result of a deal between Emperor Franz Joseph I and the Kossuth-led opposition. The coalition government imposed by the Emperor greatly reduced the threat to the dualistic constitution of Austria-Hungary, and virtually prevented implementation of the New Course Policy in cooperation with the Hungarian opposition. Regardless, the HSK cooperated with the Wekerle cabinet until May 1907. At that point, the Hungarian government introduced a legislative bill known as the Railroad Pragmatic. The legislation, passed on 3 July 1907, regulated railway workers' employment issues, but also included provisions effectively introducing the Hungarian language in official use on Croatian railways. Namely, the law required railway officials in Croatia to be Hungarian nationals who have command of the Hungarian language. Railway officials posted in Croatia were required to speak Croatian, but Hungarian was specified as the official language. The Croatian government argued that this was a breach of the 1868 Croatian–Hungarian Settlement, while the Hungarian government argued that the railway was a private enterprise to which the Settlement's provisions did not apply. The dispute would last for six years.

== Aftermath ==
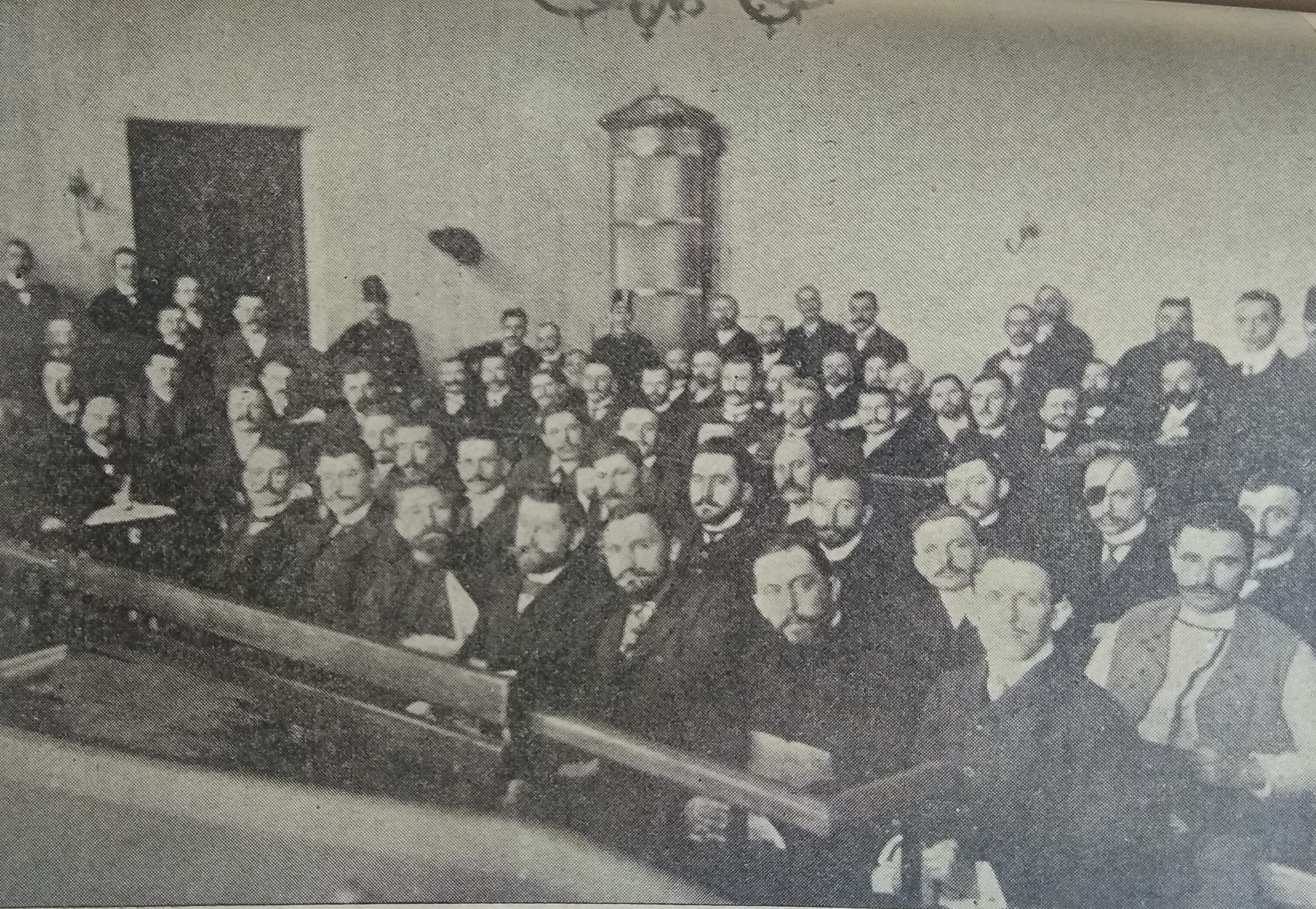
Austro-Hungarian authorities launched a campaign to break up the Croat-Serb Coalition that led to the Agram Trial (defendants pictured).

On 27 June 1907, in the course of the parliamentary debate on the Railroad Pragmatic bill, the HSK declared it was moving into opposition to the Hungarian government, due to the proposed legislation. The move caused Ban Pejačević and his government to resign. Following the failure of the New Course Policy, a portion of the HSP members no longer supported the HSK. The Social Democrats and the SNRS left the HSK as well. The remaining elements of the HSK championed the national oneness of Croats and Serbs, giving the HSK new objective to pursue. In 1910, the HSK membership further consolidated as the HSP merged with the Croatian Progressive Party to form the Croatian Independent Party.

Following the HSK's move to the opposition to Wekerle, the Hungarian government offered Pribićević help towards establishment of Greater Serbia if he would take the SSS out of the HSK, but the offer was declined. In order to prevent a new threat to dualism from Croatia, Wekerle and Austro-Hungarian foreign minister Alois Lexa von Aehrenthal planned to discredit and isolate the SSS and to form a new party by pushing the HSP and the Frankists closer together. Newly appointed Ban Pavao Rauch, prompted by Aehrenthal and Wekerle, launched a propaganda campaign against the SSS, accusing them of plotting to achieve Serbian annexation of Bosnia and Herzegovina. Believing the campaign was effective, Rauch called the 1908 election, where the HSK won 56 of 88 seats in the Sabor convened in March. Rauch publicly claimed that the electoral defeat was the result of Serbian propaganda. In early August, a month ahead of the Austro-Hungarian annexation of Bosnia and Herzegovina, arrests began of more than 50 Serbs, including SSS members, on charges of treason. The resulting Agram Trial was intended to simultaneously break-up the HSK and justify the Austro-Hungarian annexation of Bosnia and Herzegovina. The HSK survived, but it reacted by turning to opportunistic cooperation with the Austro-Hungarian authorities for fear of further prosecution. In 1909, the Wekerle government collapsed and Khuen-Héderváry was appointed the new prime minister. Believing the HSK could become an ally, Khuen-Héderváry proposed that the HSK remove Rauch from the position of Ban of Croatia in return for HSK's support for his government and Supilo's removal from the coalition. The HSK accepted, and Nikola Tomašić was appointed the new Ban of Croatia. It is unclear if Supilo left voluntarily. His leading role was filled by an SSS-dominated collective leadership – especially by Pribićević.

== Sources ==
- Banac, Ivo (1984). The National Question in Yugoslavia: Origins, History, Politics. Ithaca: Cornell University Press. ISBN 978-0-8014-1675-0.
- Bartulin, Nevenko (2012). "From Independence to Trialism: The Croatian Party of Right and the Project for a Liberal "Greater Croatia" within the Habsburg Empire, 1861–1914". In Fitzpatrick, Matthew P. (ed.). Liberal Imperialism in Europe. London: Palgrave Macmillan. pp. 115–140. ISBN 978-1-349-43739-9.
- Biondich, Mark (2000). Stjepan Radić, the Croat Peasant Party, and the Politics of Mass Mobilization, 1904-1928. Toronto: University of Toronto Press. ISBN 0-8020-4727-0.
- Bulić, Ivan (2012). "Politika Hrvatsko-srpske koalicije uoči Prvoga svjetskog rata 1907.–1913" [Politics of the Croat-Serb Coalition Before the World War I, 1907–1913]. Časopis za suvremenu povijest (in Croatian). 44 (2). Zagreb: Croatian Institute of History: 415–453. ISSN 0590-9597.
- Čipčić, Marijan (2017). ""Novi kurs" i političko djelovanje Vicka Ivčevića" [New Course Policy and Vicko Ivčević's Political Activities]. Kulturna baština (in Croatian) (42–43). Split: Društvo prijatelja kulturne baštine Split: 61–76. ISSN 0351-0557.
- Djilas, Aleksa (1991). The Contested Country: Yugoslav Unity and Communist Revolution, 1919-1953. Cambridge: Harvard University Press. ISBN 9780674166981.
- Djokić, Dejan (2003). "(Dis)integrating Yugoslavia: King Alexander and Interwar Yugoslavism". In Djokić, Dejan (ed.). Yugoslavism: Histories of a Failed Idea, 1918-1992. London: C. Hurst & Co. pp. 136–156. ISBN 1-85065-663-0.
- Fuerst-Bjeliš, Borna; Glamuzina, Nikola (2021). The Historical Geography of Croatia; Territorial Change and Cultural Landscapes. Cham: Springer. ISBN 978-3-030-68432-7.
- Headlam, James Wycliffe (1911). "Austria-Hungary" . In Chisholm, Hugh (ed.). Encyclopædia Britannica. Vol. 3 (11th ed.). Cambridge University Press. pp. 2–39.
- Matković, Stjepan (1996). "Čista stranka prava i stranački izbori na prijelazu 19. u 20. stoljeće" [The Pure Party of Right and Parliamentary Elections at the Turn of the 19th Century]. Povijesni prilozi (in Croatian). 15 (15). Zagreb: Croatian Institute of History: 59–91. ISSN 1848-9087.
- Miller, Nicholas J. (2010). Between Nation and State: Serbian Politics in Croatia Before the First World War. University of Pittsburgh Press. ISBN 978-0-8229-7722-3.
- Ramet, Sabrina P. (2006). The Three Yugoslavias: State-Building and Legitimation, 1918–2005. Bloomington: Indiana University Press. ISBN 978-0-253-34656-8.
- Šetić, Nevio (2014). "Odnos istarskih pravaša prema raskolu u Stranci prava Banske Hrvatske 1895" [Relation of the Istrian Members of the Party of Rights Toward the Disunion in the Party of Rights in Ban's Croatia of 1895]. Tabula: časopis Filozofskog fakulteta, Sveučilište Jurja Dobrile u Puli (in Croatian) (12). Pula: Juraj Dobrila University of Pula: 233–244. doi:10.32728/tab.12.2014.20. ISSN 1331-7830.
- Trencsényi, Balázs; Janowski, Maciej; Baár, Mónika; Falina, Maria; Kopeček, Michal (2016). A History of Modern Political Thought in East Central Europe. Vol. I: Negotiating Modernity in the 'Long Nineteenth Century'. Oxford: Oxford University Press. ISBN 978-0-19-873714-8.
- Veselinović, Velimir (2018). "Pregled razvoja pravaške ideologije i politike" [An Overview of the Development of Rightist Ideology and Politics]. Časopis za suvremenu povijest (in Croatian). 50 (3). Zagreb: Croatian Institute of History: 583–620. ISSN 0590-9597.
- Vujačić, Veljko (2015). Nationalism, Myth, and the State in Russia and Serbia. Cambridge University Press. p. 202. ISBN 9781107074088.
