= Franko Potočnjak =

Croatian politician and lawyer (1862 – 1932)

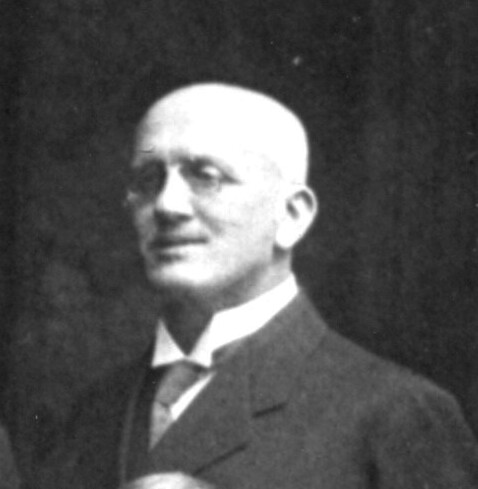
- Franko Potočnjak in 1916
- Born: 2 August 1862; Novi Vinodolski, Kingdom of Croatia, Austrian Empire (now Croatia)
- Died: 18 January 1932 (aged 69); Zagreb, Yugoslavia (now Croatia)
- Education: University of Zagreb
- Occupations: Politician, lawyer
- Political party: Party of Rights; Croat-Serb Coalition

Franko Potočnjak (Novi Vinodolski, 2 August 1862 – Zagreb, 18 January 1932) was a lawyer and Croatian and Yugoslavian politician. Potočnjak graduated in law from the University of Zagreb and worked as a court clerk until 1887 when he opened a law office in the town of Sveti Ivan Zelina. He joined the Party of Rights and he was editor of its journal Hrvatska domovina n 1896–1897. Potočnjak successfully advocated a coalition of the Independent People's Party and the faction of the Party of Rights led by Fran Folnegović. He was elected to the Croatian Sabor as the Party of Rights candidate in the 1897 Croatian parliamentary election in the district of Bakar. However, he was excluded from Sabor meetings due to his criticism of the Ban of Croatia Károly Khuen-Héderváry. He was elected to the Croatian Sabor again (the Party of Rights was a part of the Croat-Serb Coalition at the time) in the 1906 Croatian parliamentary election and delegated as a representative to the Diet of Hungary in 1906–1907.

He left politics in 1908 believing that policies of the Croat-Serb Coalition were too passive and opportunistic, choosing to relocate his law firm to Crikvenica. Potočnjak left Austria-Hungary following the outbreak of World War I and, in 1915, joined the Yugoslav Committee—an ad-hoc group advocating dissolution of Austria-Hungary and political unification of the South Slavs living in the empire and in the Kingdom of Serbia. The same year, he submitted a memorandum to the prime minister of Serbia Nikola Pašić, advocating a highly centralised, unitary state of the South Slavs. In 1916, Potočnjak took part in establishment of South Slavic volunteer troops (the First Serbian Volunteer Division) in Odesa and worked as the editor of Slovenski jug newspaper there. In 1917, at Pašić's invitation, Potočnjak took part in a conference that produced the Corfu Declaration on unification of the South Slavs. After establishment of the Kingdom of Serbs, Croats and Slovenes, he was appointed the deputy Ban of Croatia in 1920 and worked as the state prosecutor in 1922–1924.
