= Fran Folnegović =

Croatian politician (1848–1903)

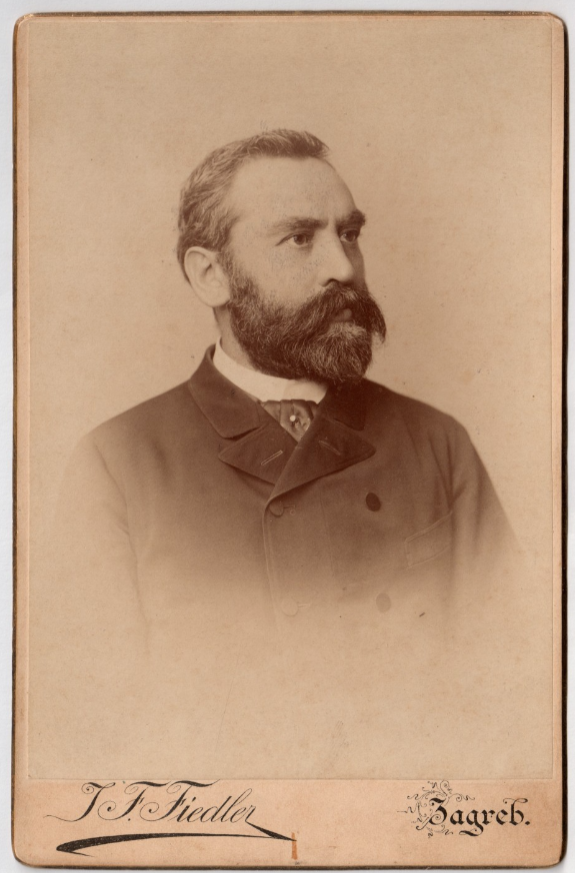
- Portrait of Fran Folnegović taken in 1890
- Born: 17 February 1848; Slanovec, Kingdom of Croatia, Austrian Empire (now Croatia)
- Died: 18 July 1903 (aged 55); Zagreb, Kingdom of Croatia-Slavonia, Austria-Hungary (now Croatia)
- Resting place: Mirogoj Cemetery
- Occupation: Politician
- Political party: Party of Rights

Fran Folnegović (17 February 1848 – 18 July 1903) was a Croatian politician. He was a member of the Sabor of the Kingdom of Croatia-Slavonia elected on the Party of Rights ticket six times. Folnegović became one of the principal members of the party. He persuaded the Party of Rights founder Ante Starčević to end his political retirement and lead the party. Despite criticism from Starčević's nephew David who accused Folnegović of departures from Starčević's uncompromising pursuit of Croatian independence, Folnegović rose to the position of the vice-president of the party's central committee. In practice, he was leading the Party of Rights since Starčević, formally the president, was too ill to effectively lead the party.

Folnegović advocated cooperation or merger with the Independent People's Party and strengthening of Croatia's position within Austria-Hungary. This led to a conflict with Josip Frank and fragmentation of the Party of Rights. Namely, Folnegović adopted some elements of Yugoslavism as a part of his political views, while Frank and his adherents known as the Frankists rejected the ideology completely. The break between the two culminated when Folnegović distanced the party from violence at the occasion of the 1895 visit by Emperor Franz Joseph to Zagreb—which involved Frank's sons Vladimir and Ivo. This led to establishment of the Pure Party of Rights by the Frankists and rebranding of the remainder of the party as the Croatian Party of Rights.

== Before politics ==
Fran Folnegović was born in Slanovec, at the time a village in the Podsljeme area near Zagreb, and studied law in Zagreb, Budapest, and Graz before he was appointed assistant notary in 1870 and a case clerk at the Zagreb court a year later. Due to poor health, Folnegović transferred to the same, but less demanding, position at Samobor court in 1875. On the basis of his good relations with bishop Josip Juraj Strossmayer, Folnegović succeeded August Šenoa as the editor of Vijenac magazine in 1882 after Šenoa's death.

== Political work ==
=== Party of Rights ===
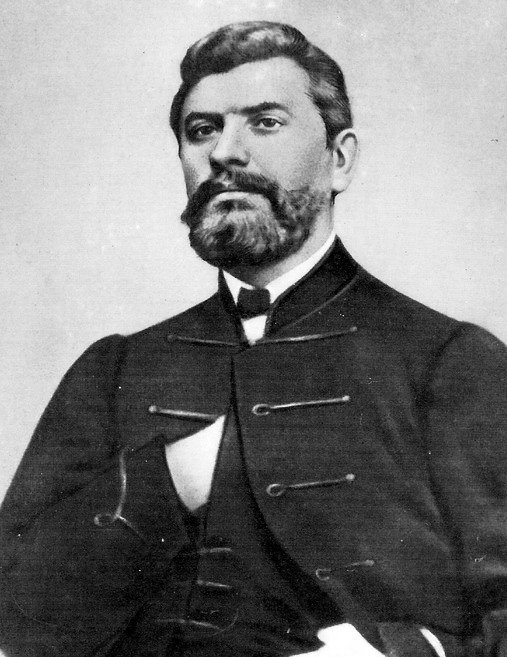
Ante Starčević was the founder of the Party of Rights.

Folnegović was first elected a member of the Sabor of the Kingdom of Croatia-Slavonia in 1875. He ran in the district of Sesvete as a Party of Rights candidate endorsed by the party founder Ante Starčević. Following the elections, Folnegović was the sole Party of Rights member of the parliament. He was reelected in 1878, 1881, and 1884 in the Senj district. He was reelected to the Sabor two more times. Once in 1889 in Švarča district (near Karlovac) and once more in 1892 Sisak respectively.

In 1878, Folnegović prompted Ante Starčević to return to politics and the helm of the Party of Rights after a seven-year hiatus. Namely, Ante Starčević retired in 1871 after failure of the Rakovica revolt led by Eugen Kvaternik. In late 1880s and early 1890s, factions began to form within the party centered on Folnegović and Josip Frank. Some prominent party figures such as the head of the Club of the Party of Rights Baron Juraj Rukavina Vidovgradski and party leader's nephew David Starčević, criticised both Folnegović and Frank for their willingness to pursue political objectives through various compromises and departure from the struggle for an independent Croatian state. Specifically, both claimed that partial Croatian statehood within Austria-Hungary would be an acceptable political objective. In that respect Folnegović's and Frank's positions differed from political views held by Ante Starčević expressed before the Rakovica revolt. In the course of unsuccessful negotiations on potential merger of the Party of Rights and the Independent People's Party, and adoption of the two parties' common political programme in 1894, views held by Folnegović and Frank diverged considerably. Folnegović supported the idea of the merger and accepted some elements of Yugoslavism as political goals. Frank rejected Yugoslavism entirely and would only approve of the merger if the Party of Rights leadership were to dominate the new party. The conflict between the two factions was often mediated by Ante Trumbić as a prominent member of the Party of Rights Dalmatian chapter.

The rivalry between Folnegović and Frank deepened as both saw themselves as a potential successor to Ante Starčević. While Folnegović had the support of most of the party leading figures and was the longest-serving member of the Sabor in the party, Frank hoped to gain advantage through a closer relationship with Ante Starčević. In that respect, Frank became particularly engaged with construction of the Starčevićev dom building in Zagreb, hoping to curry favour with the party founder.

=== Fragmentation of the party ===
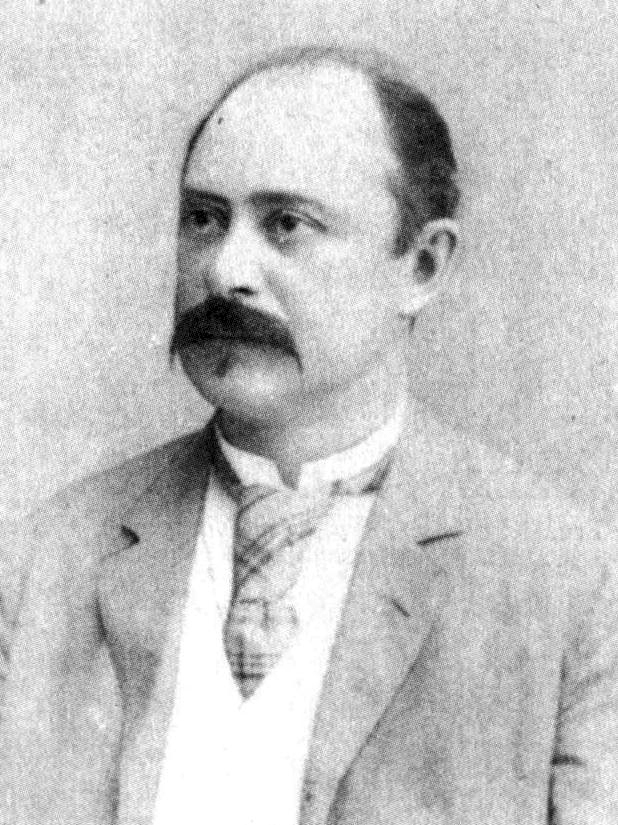
Folnegović and Josip Frank (pictured) led opposing factions within the Party of Rights.

In 1895, the Party of Rights appointed the Central Committee as the governing body. Ante Starčević was its president, but due to his illness and absence from day-to-day work, Folnegović was in control of the party as the elected vice-president. Furthermore, Folnegović ensured that his opponents Mile Starčević and Frank were left out, or appointed to lower-tier positions in the committee, as was the case with Eugen Kumičić. At the same time, Folnegović helped Trumbić and Frano Supilo who supported his political views to become full members of the committee. Frank remained the main opponent of Folnegović, accusing the Central Committee of being a device of betrayal of the Party of Rights. Ante Starčević supported Frank in levying the accusations against Folnegović. The same year, new leadership of the Club of the Party of Rights was also elected. Folnegović ran for the president, with Grga Tuškan nominated as his vice-president. Even though Frank and his ally Kumičić were supported by Ante Starčević, Folnegović and Tuškan won. The defeat left Frank embittered.

The split in the Party of Rights among Folnegović's and Frank's supporters produced factions known as the Frankist faction (Croatian: Frankovci) and Homeland faction (Domovinaši), named after Frank and the party newspaper Hrvatska domovina (lit. 'Croatian Homeland'). The immediate cause for the split was Folnegović's speech in which he distanced the party from violence at the occasion of the 1895 visit by Emperor Franz Joseph to Zagreb. In particular, two people involved in the violence were Frank's sons Vladimir and Ivo. Folnegović resigned from the Central Committee and the Sabor, while Frank, supported by Ante Starčević, went on to form the Pure Party of Rights joined by a number of former Party of Rights members. In 1897, the Homeland faction formed an opposition coalition with the Independent People's Party, and Folnegović returned to politics to support the coalition. Folnegović died in Zagreb, and is buried at the Mirogoj Cemetery.

== Legacy ==
A neighborhood of Peščenica – Žitnjak in Zagreb is named Folnegovićevo naselje after him.

== Sources ==
- Gross, Mirjana (1998). "Folnegović, Fran". Croatian Biographical Lexicon (in Croatian). Miroslav Krleža Institute of Lexicography.
- Strukić, Kristian (12 November 2013). "Pogledajte kako je izgledao početak razvoja Folke" [See How Folka Development Started] (in Croatian). Večernji list.
- Šetić, Nevio (2014). "Odnos istarskih pravaša prema raskolu u Stranci prava Banske Hrvatske 1895" [Relation of the Istrian Members of the Party of Rights Toward the Disunion in the Party of Rights in Ban's Croatia of 1895]. Tabula: časopis Filozofskog fakulteta, Sveučilište Jurja Dobrile u Puli (in Croatian) (12). Pula: Juraj Dobrila University of Pula: 233–244. doi:10.32728/tab.12.2014.20. ISSN 1331-7830.
- Trutanić, Jure (2021). "David Starčević u raskolu Stranke prava 1895" [David Starčević and the 1895 Schism in the Party of Right]. Radovi Zavoda za hrvatsku povijest Filozofskoga fakulteta Sveučilišta u Zagrebu (in Croatian). 53 (2). Zagreb: Faculty of Humanities and Social Sciences, University of Zagreb: 179–204. doi:10.17234/RadoviZHP.53.21. ISSN 0353-295X.
- Veselinović, Velimir (2018). "Pregled razvoja pravaške ideologije i politike" [An Overview of the Development of Rightist Ideology and Politics]. Časopis za suvremenu povijest (in Croatian). 50 (3). Zagreb: Croatian Institute of History: 583–620. doi:10.22586/csp.v50i3.105. ISSN 0590-9597.
- "Vremeplov: srpanj" [Time machine: July] (in Croatian). Gradska groblja Zagreb.
