= 1883 Croatian parliamentary by-election =

By-elections for the Croatian Military Frontier districts that had been incorporated into the Kingdom of Croatia-Slavonia in 1881 were held over three days between 19 and 21 April 1883.

== Results ==
Party	Seats
Government list	28
Party of Rights	5
Independent People's Party	1
Independents	1
Total	35

== Elected representatives ==
#	Name	Party	Constituency
1	Fran Prilepić	Party of Rights	Karlobag
2	David Kovačević	Government list	Gospić
3	Mandić	Government list	Lovinac
4	Medaković	Government list	Srb
5	Dane Banjanin	Government list	Udbina
6	Orešković	Government list	Perušić
7	Omčikus	Government list	Otočac
8	Ladislav Krajač	Party of Rights	Brlog
9	Šorak	Government list	Petrovo Selo
10	Milan Pavlović	Party of Rights	Brinje
11	Ivan Kukuljević Sakcinski	Government list	Ogulin
12	Milan Stanković	Government list	Plaško
13	Badovinac	Government list	Slunj
14	Slijepčević	Government list	Veljun
15	Grga Tuškan	Party of Rights	Švarča
16	Čudić	Government list	Vrginmost
17	Slijepčević	Government list	Glina
18	Milić	Government list	Maja
19	Joco Živković	Government list	Dvor
20	Pejaković	Government list	Petrinja
21	Mašeg	Government list	Kostajnica
22	Mraović	Government list	Sunja
23	Crkvenec	Government list	Novska
24	Lobe	Government list	Nova Gradiška
25	Makso Lončarević	Party of Rights	Oriovac
26	Đuro Pilar	Independent	Brod na Savi
27	Stjepan Kutuzović	Independent People's Party	Vrpolje
28	Ivić	Government list	Vinkovci
29	Ivić	Government list	Bošnjaci
30	Stevo Popović	Government list	Morović
31	Milekić	Government list	Mitrovica
32	Rakić	Government list	Karlovčić
33	Gjurić	Government list	Stara Pazova
34	Gjurković / Radanović	Government list	Sremski Karlovci
35	Jovan Živković	Government list	Zemun
