= 1892 Croatian parliamentary election =

- 30–31 May and 1–2 June 1892

88 seats to the Sabor
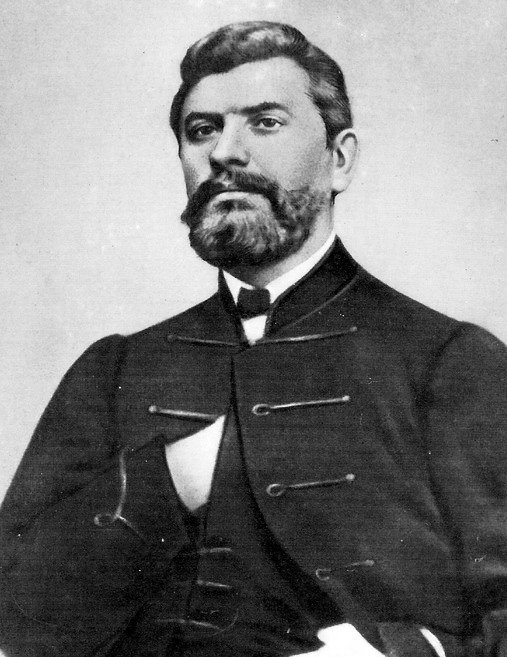
	First party	Second party
Leader		Ante Starčević
Party	People's Party	Party of Rights
Seats won	77 / 88	8 / 88
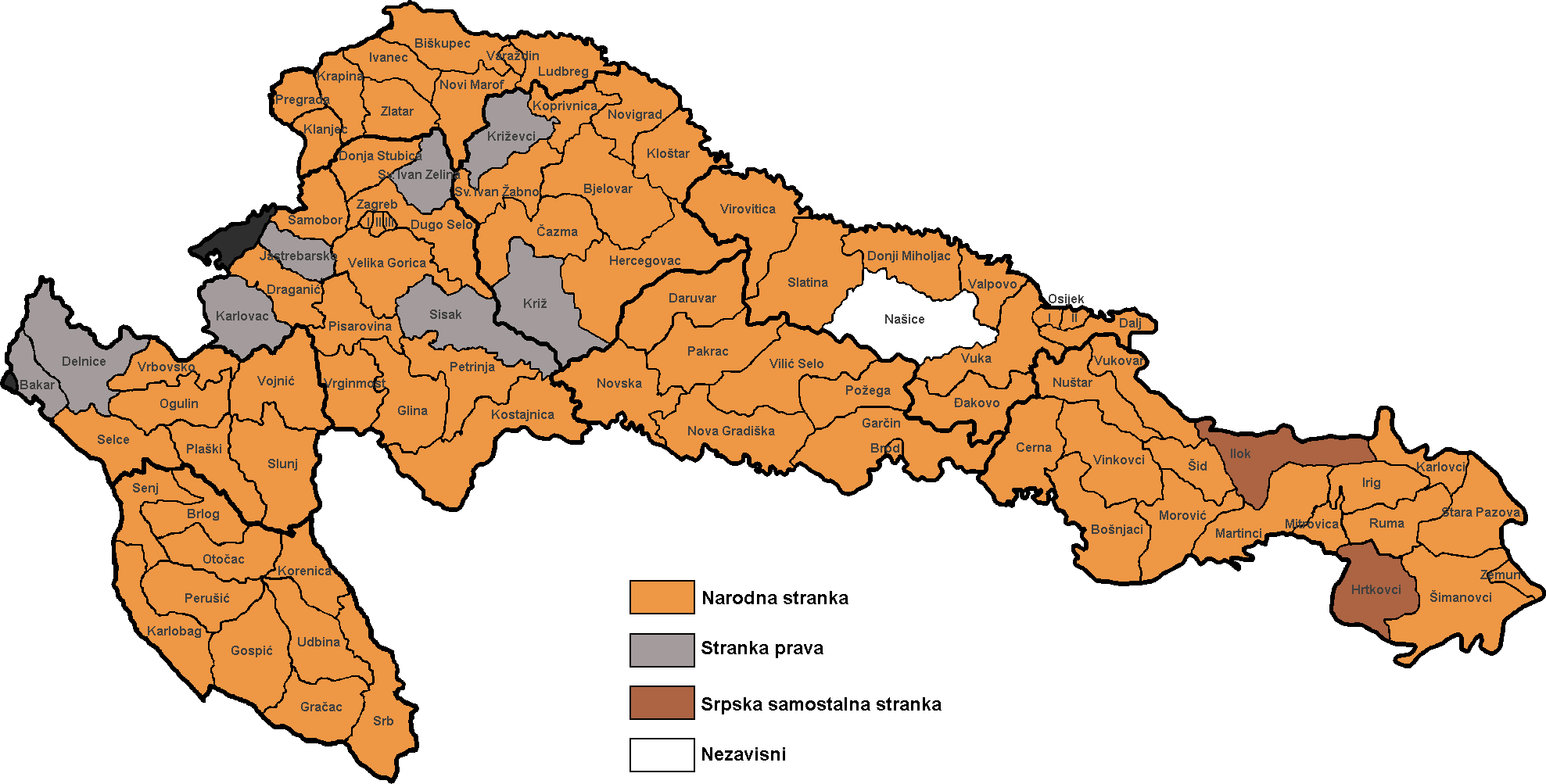
- Results of the election in each of the electoral districts in 8 counties of the Kingdom of Croatia-Slavonia: the party with the plurality of votes in each district: People's Party Party of Rights Serb Independent Party Independent

Parliamentary elections for the Kingdom of Croatia-Slavonia Parliament were held on 30–31 May and 1–2 June 1892.

== Results ==
Party	Seats	+/–
People's Party	77	–10
Party of Rights	8	–1
Serb Independent Party	2	New
Independents	1	–1
Total	88	–19
