= Potočnjak =

Potočnjak is a surname. It is a cognate of the Slovak surname Potočňák and Polish Potoczniak. Notable people with the surname include:

- Franko Potočnjak (1862–1932), Croatian politician
- Žarko Potočnjak (1946–2021), Croatian actor
