= 1887 Croatian parliamentary election =

Parliamentary elections for the Croatian Parliament were held on 17 and 18 June 1887 in the Kingdom of Croatia-Slavonia. The People's Party won the elections with 87 out of 110 seats. Elections in 3 districts were suspended.

== Results ==
Party	Seats	+/–
People's Party	87	+18
Party of Rights	9	–16
Independent People's Party	7	–6
Centrum	2	New
Independents	2	–1
Total	107	–3
