= 1884 Croatian parliamentary election =

Parliamentary elections were held in the Kingdom of Croatia-Slavonia on September 16–19, 1884. The People's Party emerged as the victor.

According to the 1881 electoral law, the franchise was limited to males over 24 years of age who paid at least ƒ15 in taxes.

== Results ==
| Party | Seats |
|---|---|
| People's Party | 69 |
| Party of Rights | 25 |
| Independent People's Party | 13 |
| Independents | 3 |
| Total | 110 |

== Sources ==
- Ferdo Šišić: Pregled povijesti hrvatskoga naroda, Matica Hrvatska, Zagreb 1975.
