= 1901 Croatian parliamentary election =

Parliamentary elections were held in the Kingdom of Croatia-Slavonia from 6 to 9 November 1901.

== Results ==
Party	Seats	+/–
People's Party	73	+14
Unified Opposition	11	–15
Pure Party of Rights	2	0
Total	86	–2
