= Juraj Rukavina =

Juraj Rukavina or Juraj Rukavina Vidovgradski may refer to:

- Juraj Rukavina Vidovgradski (soldier) (1777–1849), soldier and politician, grandfather of Juraj Rukavina born in 1834
- Juraj Rukavina Vidovgradski (politician) (1834–1915), Croatian politician, grandson of Juraj Rukavina born in 1777
- Juraj Rukavina (Ustaše Militia) (1898–1945), colonel in the Ustaše Militia during World War II, commander of the Jadovno concentration camp
