= 1906 Croatian parliamentary election =

- 3–5 May 1906

88 seats in the Sabor
- Turnout: 73.35%
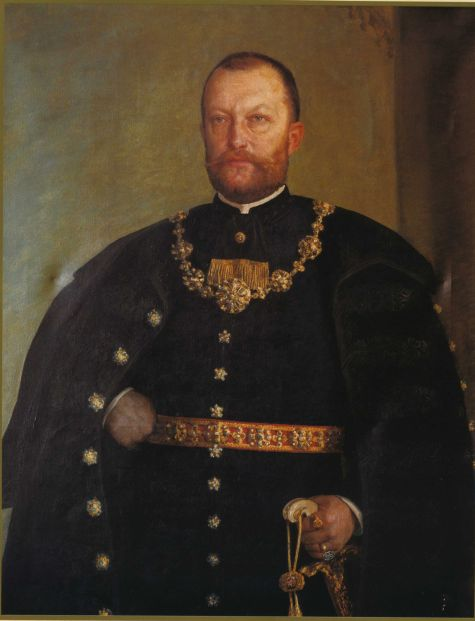

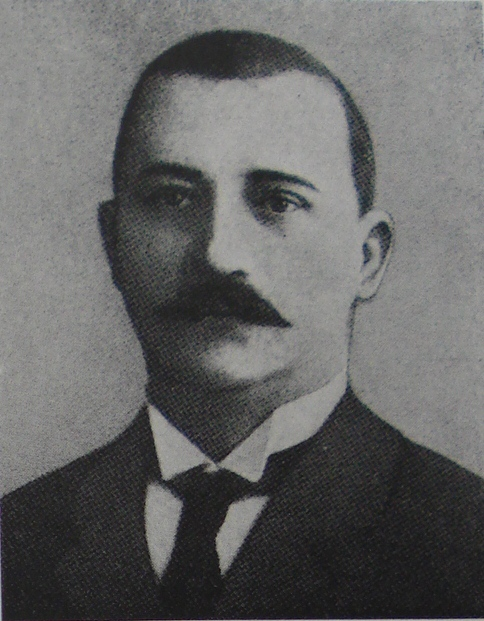

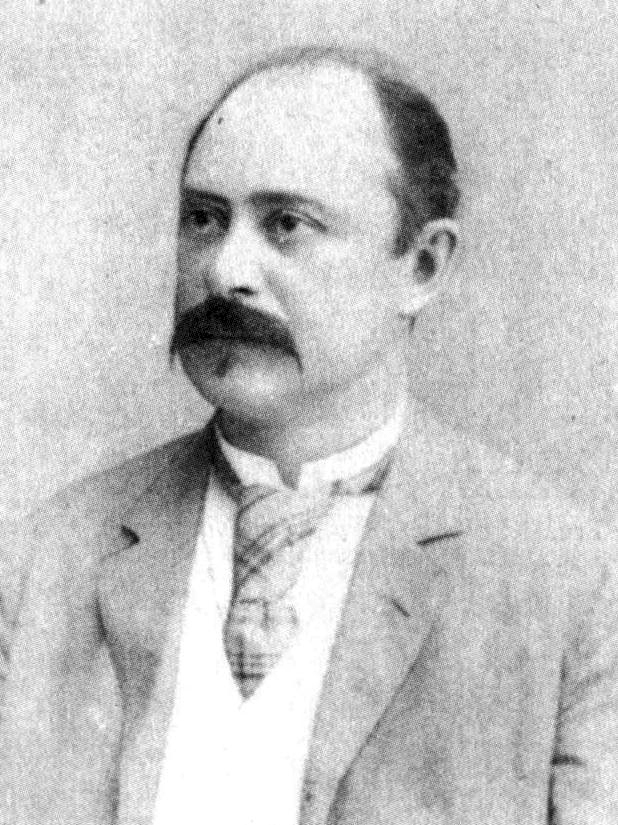
	First party	Second party	Third party
Leader	Nikola Tomašić	Frano Supilo	Josip Frank
Party	People's Party	Croat-Serb Coalition	Frankists
Seats won	37 / 88	32 / 88	19 / 88
Seat change	▼36	▲21	▲17
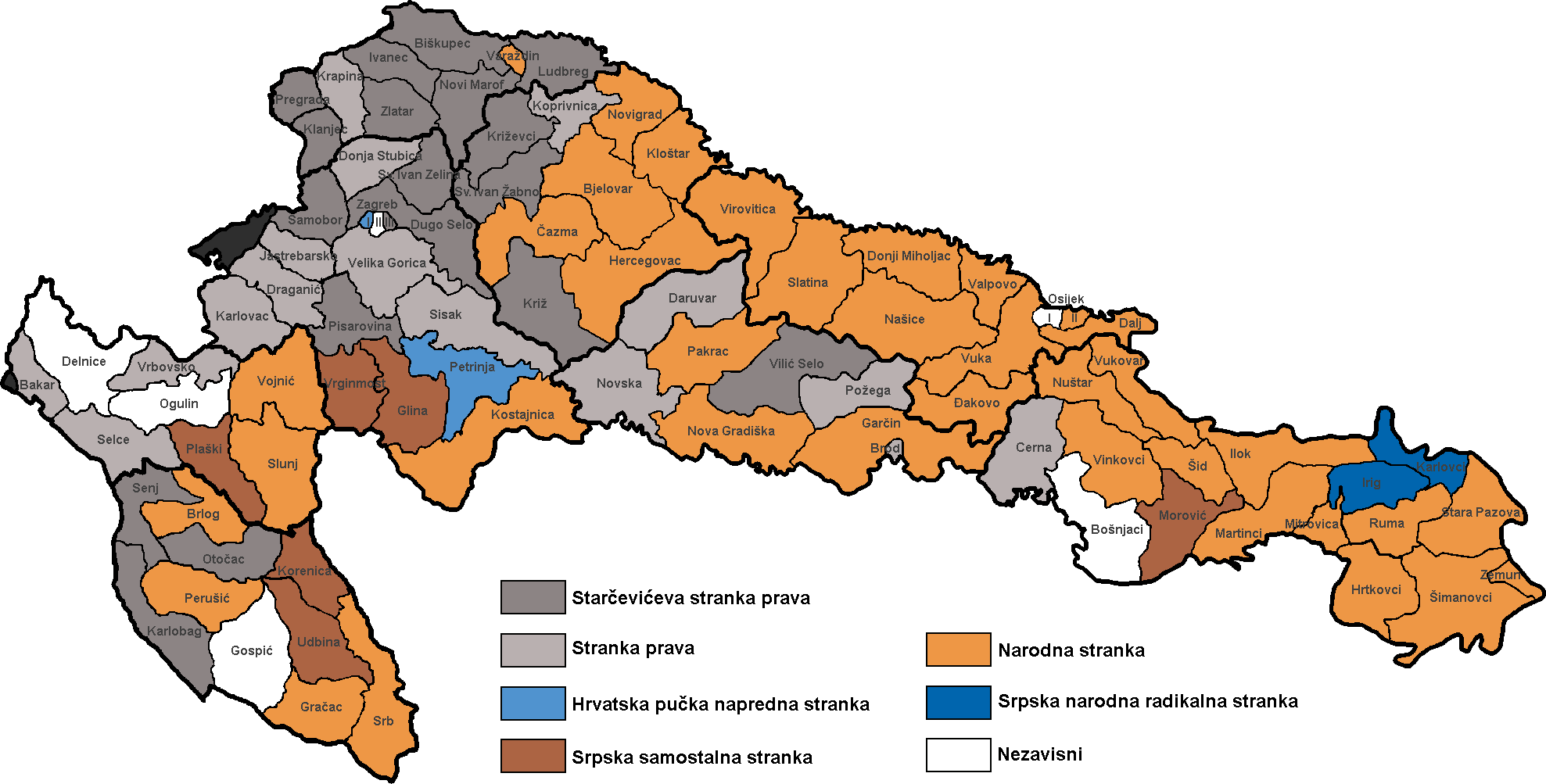
- Results of the election in each of the electoral districts in 8 counties of the Kingdom of Croatia-Slavonia: the party with the plurality of votes in each district. People's Party Frankists Party of Rights; Serb Independent Party Croatian People's Progressive Party; Serb People's Radical Party Independent

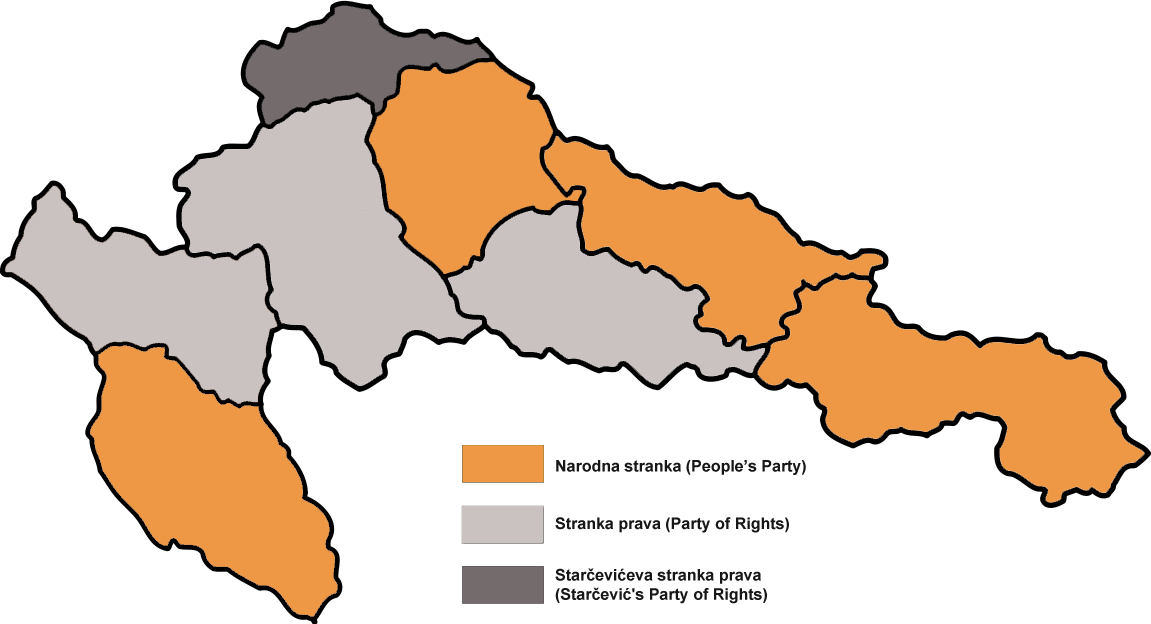
1906 election results based on the majority of seats in each County of the Kingdom of Croatia-Slavonia

Parliamentary elections were held in the Kingdom of Croatia-Slavonia on 3, 4 and 5 May 1906. 45,381 people were entitled to vote in the elections. The People's Party won 37 seats, the Croat-Serb Coalition 32 seats, and the Frankists (led by Josip Frank) won 19. On 30 April Nikola Tomašić, leader of the People's Party, renounced his candidature and left politics for a short time.

== Results ==
Party or alliance		Votes	%	Seats
People's Party				37
Croat-Serb Coalition	Party of Rights			16
Croat-Serb Coalition	Serb Independent Party			6
Croat-Serb Coalition	Croatian People's Progressive Party			2
Croat-Serb Coalition	Serb People's Radical Party			2
Croat-Serb Coalition	Independents			6
Frankists				19
Total				88
Total votes		33,289	–	
Registered voters/turnout		45,381	73.35	
