= Party of Rights =

Party of Rights Stranka prava
- Leader: Ante Starčević; Fran Folnegović; Grga Tuškan
- Founder: Ante Starčević; Eugen Kvaternik
- Founded: 26 June 1861
- Merged into: Croatian Independent Party (1910)
- Headquarters: Zagreb
- Newspaper: Zvekan; Hervatska; Hrvatska domovina
- Ideology: (izvorno) pravaštvo; Croatian nationalism; Monarchism (from 1894); Yugoslavism (from 1905)
- Slogan: Bog i Hrvati

The Party of Rights (Croatian: Stranka prava) was a Croatian nationalist political party in Kingdom of Croatia-Slavonia, a part of Austria-Hungary at the time.

It was founded in 1861 by Ante Starčević and Eugen Kvaternik, two influential nationalist politicians who advocated for the Croatian state right, a greater Croatian autonomy and later for the independence of the Kingdom of Croatia. The party split in 1895. The mainstream known as Domovinaši merged with the Croatian Progressive Party to form the Croatian United Independent Party in 1910. The splinter group known as the Frankists organised the Pure Party of Rights claiming lineage from the Party of Rights.

== Early years ==
=== Founding ===
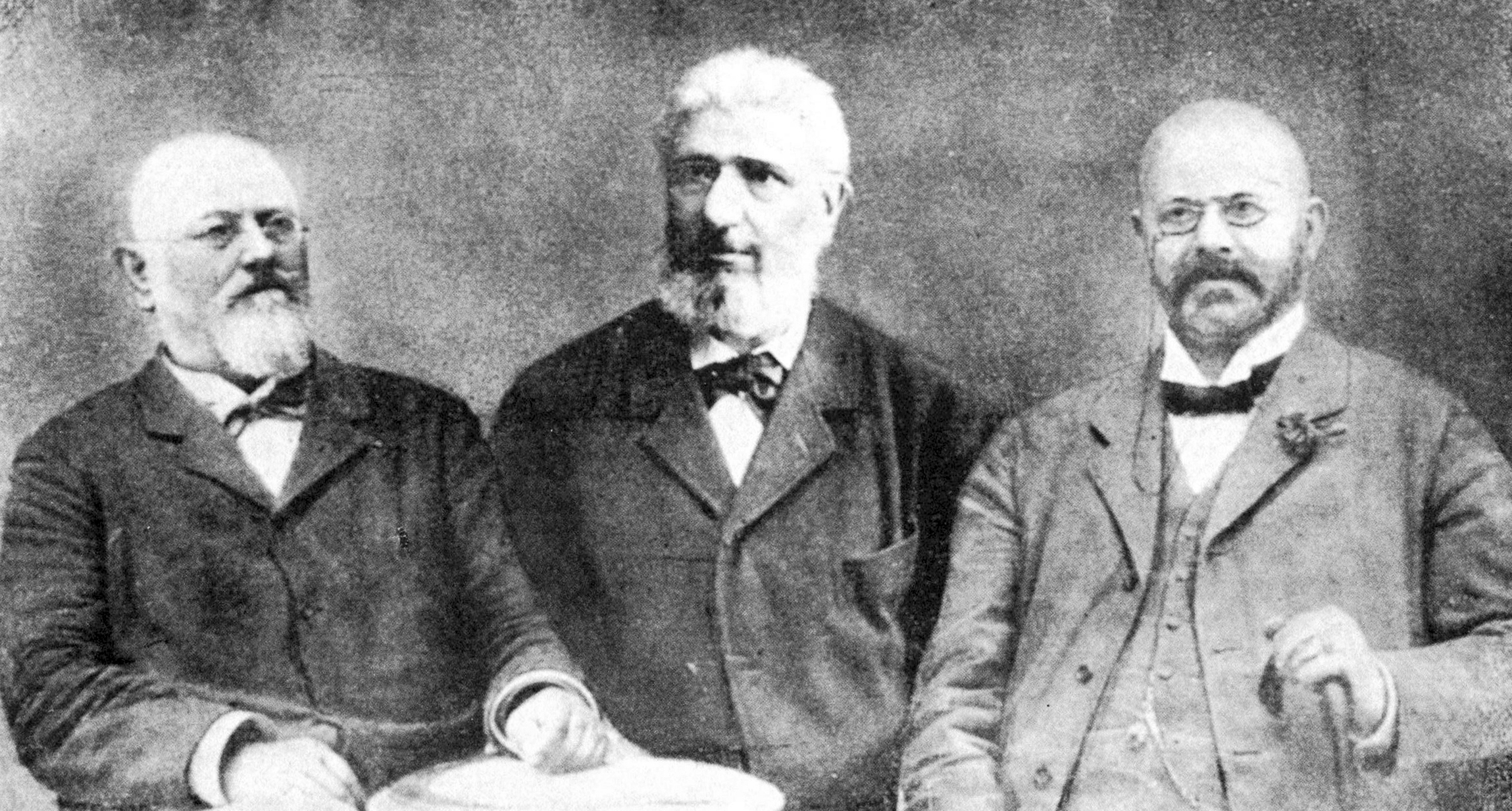
David Starčević, Ante Starčević and Mile Starčević

The Party of Rights was founded by Ante Starčević and Eugen Kvaternik inspired by the French Revolution of 1848. Starčević became disappointed with the suppression of the Revolutions of 1848 in the Austrian Empire and broke existing ties with the Illyrian movement championing the Croatian national revival. He went on to establish the Party of Rights in the aftermath of the 1861 sitting of the Croatian Sabor. On 26 June 1861, in his speech at the assembly, Starčević endorsed earlier Kvaternik's speech at the same venue, supporting his ideas that Croatia deserved a position equal to that of the Kingdom of Hungary within the Austrian Empire by reference to the Croatian state right. Starčević and Kvaternik opposed forging of closer ties between Croatia and Hungary than those existing between Vienna and Budapest. Six years later, the empire was reformed through the Austro-Hungarian Compromise of 1867 splitting Croatian lands, (Note: In the context of the Habsburg Monarchy, the term Croatian lands normally refers to the kingdoms of Croatia-Slavonia and Dalmatia, as well as Istria, the city of Rijeka, and Međimurje. These areas largely corresponded to the so-called Triune Kingdom. Founders of the Party of Rights defined the Croatian lands in vague terms since 1860s. Eugen Kvaternik described it as the area bounded by the Alps, the Danube and Drina rivers, and Albania. Ante Starčević spoke of an even wider area, extending beyond Drina – to the Timok River.) between Cisleithania and Transleithania, the Austrian and Hungarian parts of Austria-Hungary. The Compromise and its consequences, including the 1868 Croatian–Hungarian Settlement regulating relations between Hungary and the Kingdom of Croatia-Slavonia, were opposed by the Party of Rights.

=== Rakovica revolt ===
Kvaternik went into exile in 1863, looking for allies that would support Croatian liberation from Austrian rule by force of arms. He first unsuccessfully sought help from the Russian Empire before turning to France. After meeting Jerome Napoleon Bonaparte II in Paris to discuss support for Croatia, Kvaternik wrote La Croatie et la confédération Italienne (lit. 'Croatia and the Italian Confederation') on the topic. He returned to Croatia to work with Starčević editing party newspaper Hervatska in late 1860s. Hervatska was an addition to Zvekan satirical magazine, launched by Starčević as the first party paper. Acting without Starčević's knowledge, Kvaternik went to the Croatian Military Frontier, gathered 400 supporters in the area and started a rebelion against Austro-Hungarian rule that later became known as the Rakovica revolt on 8 October 1872. The uprising was crushed and Kvaternik killed in three days. As a consequence, martial law was introduced in Croatia and Starčević arrested. As a result the Party of Rights was unable to function freely from government control until the 1880s. Starčević retired from politics following suppression of the revolt. He endorsed Fran Folnegović who became the sole Party of Rights candidate elected to the Sabor in 1875. Three years later, Folnegović was reelected and he prompted Starčević to return to politics and the helm of the Party of Rights.

=== Appointment of Károly Khuen-Héderváry ===
Following the 1883 Anti-Hungarian protests in Croatia motivated by gradual infringement against Croatia's autonomy, the Hungarian government imposed martial law in Croatia-Slavonia and shortly afterwards appointed Károly Khuen-Héderváry the Ban, effectively the prime minister of Croatia-Slavonia. Khuen-Héderváry's rule was marked by Magyarisation of Croatia in breach of the proclaimed guarantees offered by the Settlement. (Note: The offending measures included the introduction of bilingual signage on official buildings in Croatian and Hungarian languages, the introduction of Hungarian as the teaching language in civil service schools and in railways in Croatia-Slavonia, the placing of the Hungarian arms on buildings in Croatia-Slavonia, and an order to change place names to conform to Hungarian preferences. A further point of contention rose from the fact that German- or Hungarian-speaking landowners employed Hungarian-speaking estate administrators who brought immigrant labour while the number of Croats moving to the United States in search of work was rapidly increasing. The conflict gave rise to the Croatian ethnolinguistic national movement.) Khuen-Héderváry ruled with the support of the Sabor majority, largely consisting of the representatives of the People's Party. The parliamentary majority was assured by gerrymandering and suffrage granted to just 2% of the total population – the wealthiest taxpayers and civil servants. Disciplinary measures were introduced to penalise civil servants who voted against the government, and political suitability was a requirement for appointment of civil servants and public notaries. The supporters were provided with government subsidies for their businesses and promised favours of the Hungarian government. Khuen-Héderváry also had the support of Croatian Serbs who formed the Serbian Club within the People's Party. He sought to use the Serbs to redirect hatred of the Croatian population from the regime to Serbs through political favouritism, including enactment of legislation to legalise use of the Serbian language and the Cyrillic alphabet in Croatia-Slavonia and partially repealing the law secularising education in relation to schools operated by the Patriarchate of Karlovci. (Note: The law enacted in 1874 under Ban Ivan Mažuranić secularised the education in Croatia-Slavonia – placing the state in control of the schools previously controlled by the Catholic Church and the Serbian Orthodox Church. The move was meant to replicate the education system already in place elsewhere in Austria-Hungary.) In turn, the Serbs became prominent exponents of Khuen-Héderváry's rule. He exploited political issues related to the Croatian Serbs with the aim of sowing divisions in order to facilitate his rule. As a result of the Ban's policies, divisions between Croats and Serbs deepened.

Khuen-Héderváry enjoyed full support of Emperor Franz Joseph I. During a 1885 visit to Požega and Brod, the emperor said that the Party of Rights was resorting to terrorism in pursuit of its agenda. Conversely, the Party of Rights was trying to frame instances of confrontation with the ban's governing, such as the Sabor assault on Khuen Héderváry later that year, as ban's attacks on integrity of imperial officers. By extension, the Party of Rights potrayed the event as an act questioning legality of the imperial rule vainly hoping to render Khuen Héderváry unfit for the office in the eyes of the emperor.

== Modern political party ==
=== Rise of competing factions ===
In late 1880s and early 1890s, factions began to form within the party centered on Folnegović and Josip Frank. Some prominent party figures such as the head of the Club of the Party of Rights Baron Juraj Rukavina Vidovgradski and party leader's nephew David Starčević, (Note: Historiography normally refers to brothers David and Mile Starčević as nephews of Ante Starčević and to Ante as their uncle. They were first cousins once removed; Mile and David's grandfather David and Ante's father Jakov were brothers. Regardless, David and Mile referred to Ante as "uncle", and Ante referred to the brothers as "nephews" and historiography generally accepted those labels.) criticised both Folnegović and Frank for their willingness to pursue political objectives through various compromises and departure from the struggle for an independent Croatian state. Specifically, both claimed that partial Croatian statehood within Austria-Hungary would be an acceptable political objective. In that respect Folnegović's and Frank's positions differed from political views stated by Ante Starčević before the Rakovica revolt.

In the course of unsuccessful negotiations on potential merger of the Party of Rights and the Independent People's Party, and adoption of the two parties' common political programme in 1894, views held by Folnegović and Frank diverged considerably. Folnegović supported the idea of the merger and accepted some elements of Yugoslavism as political goals, recognising that Croat-Serb conflict was only beneficial to Hungarian encroachment in Croatia. Frank withheld approval of the merger unless the Party of Rights leadership were to dominate the new party. His faction of the Party of Rights intended to entice the House of Habsburg-Lorraine to reform the Empire into a state consisting of three constituent parts, (Note: The historiography refers to this concept as trialism in Austria-Hungary.) adding a Croatian part of the monarchy carved out of the existing Austrian and Hungarian ones. They rejected Yugoslavism for fear it might lead to establishment of Greater Serbia at the expense of Croatian interests. In response, the faction championed the idea of national expansionism to achieve a Greater Croatia, pursuing a policy of Austro-Croatism. Frank thought Austria might favour Croatian interests because the Empire could no longer expand except in the Balkans. (Note: The eastward Austro-Hungarian expansion was interpreted as an element of a wider German expansionism and Drang nach Osten.) He thought such expansion would be at the expense of Serbia and it would justify an anti-Serbian policy. At the same time, Frank viewed the Austro-Hungarian occupation of Bosnia and Herzegovina as enforcement of a claim to the region under the Croatian state right. (Note: A portion of Austrian aristocracy supported the idea of a reformed Empire where Dalmatia as well as Bosnia and Herzegovina would be added to Croatia-Slavonia to form a united Croatia with constitutional ties to Austria rather than Hungary. The idea, involving the return to the 1860 October Diploma constitution was rejected by Emperor Franz Joseph I. Regardless of the rejection, the Frankists hoped such an arrangement would be possible at a later date to protect against magyarisation or against establishment of the Greater Serbia or creation of a united South Slavic state dominated by the Serbs.)

The conflict between the Frank's and Folnegović's factions was often mediated by Ante Trumbić as a prominent member of the Party of Rights Dalmatian chapter. The Dalmatian Party of Rights organisation was formally established in Zadar in 1894. It was formed by three groups of supporters of the Party of Rights: a clericalist group led by Ivo Prodan, a liberal group led by Trumbić and Frano Supilo, and a group of members of the Diet of Dalmatia led by Juraj Biankini. Thus formed party was initially led by Kažimir Ljubić. Regardless of Trumbić's mediation, the rivalry between Folnegović and Frank deepened as both saw themselves as a potential successor to Ante Starčević. While Folnegović had the support of most of the party leading figures and was the longest-serving member of the Sabor in the party, Frank hoped to gain advantage through a closer relationship with Ante Starčević. In that respect, Frank became particularly engaged with construction of the Starčevićev dom building in Zagreb, hoping to curry favour with the party founder.

=== Frankist split ===
On 17 July 1895, the Party of Rights appointed its Central Committee as the body governing the Party of Rights not only in Croatia-Slavonia but also in other territories. Ante Starčević was the Central Committee president, but due to his illness and absence from day-to-day work, Folnegović was in control of the party as the elected vice-president. Members representing the Party of Rights in Croatia-Slavonia were Folnegović, Ivan Ružić, Juraj Žerjavić, Grga Tuškan, and Vladimir Kovačević with Eugen Kumičić and Vatroslav Brlić elected as deputy members. Istrian member was Vjekoslav Spinčić with Matko Laginja as his deputy; Cezar Akačić with deputy member Rudolf Linić represented Rijeka. Dalmatian Party of Rights organisation's representatives were Trumbić and Supilo while Prodan was their deputy. Slovene lands representative was Ivan Tavčar, and Gustav Gregorin was his deputy. Bosnia was represented by Miho Babić, and Herzegovina by Frano Miličević.

Folnegović ensured that his opponents Mile Starčević and Frank were left out, or appointed to lower-tier positions in the committee. At the same time, Folnegović helped Trumbić and Supilo who supported his political views to become full members of the committee. Frank remained the main opponent of Folnegović, accusing the Central Committee of being a device of betrayal of the Party of Rights. Ante Starčević supported Frank in levying the accusations against Folnegović. The same year, new leadership of the Club of the Party of Rights was also elected. Folnegović ran for the president, with Tuškan nominated as his vice-president. Even though Frank and his vice-presidential nominee Kumičić were supported by Ante Starčević, Folnegović and Tuškan won. The defeat left Frank embittered.

On 22 October 1895, the party split. The split in the Party of Rights among Folnegović's and Frank's supporters produced the minority faction known as the Frankists (Frankovci) and the mainstream, Homeland faction (Domovinaši), named after Frank and the party newspaper Hrvatska domovina (lit. 'Croatian Homeland'). The immediate cause for the split was Folnegović's speech in which he distanced the party from violence at the occasion of the 1895 visit by Emperor Franz Joseph to Zagreb. In particular, two people involved in the violence were Frank's sons Vladimir and Ivo. The Dalmatian Party of Rights initially condemned the 1895 split and claimed to support neither the Domovinaši nor the Frankists. Three years later, in 1898, the Dalmatian Party of Rights split when a new party was formed by Prodan's supporters.

== Domovinaši ==
=== Tuškan presidency ===
In the aftermath of the split, Folnegović resigned from the Central Committee and the Sabor. He was succeeded by Tuškan as the party president. Frank, supported by Ante Starčević, went on to form the Pure Party of Rights (Čista stranka prava, ČSP). At the time of the split, the Domovinaši were more numerous and better organised than the Frankists. In the ensuing political conflict with the ČSP, Tuškan and the Party of Rights resorted to antisemitic attacks against Frank, a convert from Judaism. Despite the appointment of Tuškan, the party would not have a strong leader anymore. Instead it was led by a group of prominent members. In addition to Tuškan, Ružić, Žerjavić, and Brlić, those included Ivan Banjavčić, Franko Potočnjak, Bogoslav Mažuranić, Juraj Rukavina Vidovgradski, and Stevo Kutuzović.

=== Joining the Croat-Serb Coalition ===
In 1897, the Party of Rights restarted negotiations with the Independent People's Party and the two formed the United Opposition coalition ahead of the 1897 Croatian parliamentary election. In 1902, the two fused into the party named the United Opposition. The new party was renamed the Croatian Party of Rights (Hrvatska stranka prava, HSP) in 1903. The HSP offered the Pure Party of Rights to establish cooperation, but the offer was declined. Later that year, Trumbić and Supilo, as the leaders of the Dalmatian organisaton of the Party of Rights, saw the then dispute between Austria and Hungary regarding Hungarian demands for partition of the Common Army as an opportunity to challenge the dualist constitution of Austria-Hungary and achieve unification of Croatia-Slavonia and Dalmatia. Trumbić presented his and Supilo's idea in a speech at the Diet of Dalmatia on 7 November 1903, advocating support for Hungary's anti-dualist Party of Independence and '48 in return for Hungarian support for the addition of Dalmatia to Croatia-Slavonia despite the dualist constitution. Trumbić and Supilo named the initiative the New Course Policy (Croatian: Politika novoga kursa).

The New Course Policy was met with scepticism in Croatia-Slavonia. The first support came in 1904 from the Ivan Lorković-led Progressive Youth, a relatively minor group. Lorković thought the initiative would be a platform for cooperation with Croatian Serb politicians. In that vein, Lorković offered the Serb Independent Party cooperation asking for acknowledgement that Croatian Serbs' interests coincided with the Croatian interests. In December 1904, the Progressive Youth members transformed the organisation as the Croatian Progressive Party, hoping to attract more popular support for the party's programme calling for financial independence of Croatia from Hungary and political cooperation with the Croatian Serbs. By 1905, the New Course Policy was accepted by the HSP and the Serb Independent Party, and the two parties formed the Croat-Serb Coalition (Croatian: Hrvatsko-srpska koalicija, HSK) on that platform. On 27 April 1905, the Dalmatian organisation of the Party of Rights led by Trumbić merged with the People's Croatian Party into the Croatian Party. In 1910, the HSP merged with the Croatian Progressive Party to form the Croatian Independent Party.

== Ideology ==
At the Sabor convened in 1861, following the end of the absolutist rule of Austrian prime minister Baron Alexander von Bach, Ante Starčević and Eugen Kvaternik put forward pravaštvo (lit. 'rightism') as the ideology of the nascent Party of Rights. The ideology relied on liberal ideas and called for integration of the Croatian nation on the basis of Croatian state right. It further called for creation of a Croatian state, comprising unified Croatian lands, independent of the Habsburg monarchy. The pre-1894 ideology is referred to as the original rightism (izvorno pravaštvo). In the 1860s, political commentators deemed the Party of Rights a part of the far left extremist opposition.

Starčević and Kvaternik were inspired by views of Giuseppe Mazzini who held that each nation may only fulfill its mission in complete freedom, in its own state. Mazzini's motto Dio e popolo! (lit. 'God and people!') reflected his belief that one owes loyalty to none but God and people and Starčević took over and adapted that motto to Bog i Hrvati! (lit. 'God and Croats!'). Starčević was not decided on the preferred system of government. He gave preference to republicanism, but found constitutional monarchy acceptable as long as the rule of law was upheld.

The Party of Rights first published its programme in 1894, marking a departure from the original teachings of the party founder Ante Starčević. Namely, the original objective of the party was independence of Croatia from the Habsburg Monarchy – and the objective could not be publicly proclaimed because it was deemed treasonous. The 1894 programme called for unification of the Croatian lands and equal constitutional position of Croatia within Austria-Hungary, referred to as the trialist reform. In the process, the Party of Rights accepted and endorsed monarchism. Most of the party members accepted at least some elements of Yugoslavism as the basis for cooperation with the Independent People's Party. His ideas were rejected by the minority Frankist faction that would subsequently break away to form a new party. After an unsuccessful attempt at reconciliation with the Frankists in 1903, the party changed its ideological stance. In 1905, the HSP adopted Yugoslavist ideology as it joined the Croat-Serb Coalition.

== Participation in elections ==
The Party of Rights was first represented in the Croatian Sabor of 1861, specifically by Ante Starčević and Kvaternik. In the subsequent convocation of the Sabor, the party achieved the greatest number of elected members in the 1884 election. The Party of Rights ran in the 1897 and the 1901 elections as a part of the United Opposition coalition. The Party ran in the 1906 and 1908 elections as a part of the HSK becoming a part of the government for the first time. The Dalmatian Party of Rights organisation participated in the 1895 and 1901 elections of members of the Diet of Dalmatia.

Sabor of Croatia-Slavonia elections
Election	In coalition with	Seats won	Change	Government
Election	In coalition with	(excluding coalition partners)		Government
1861	None	2 / 120	New	Opposition
1865	None	4 / 65	▲2	Opposition
1867	None	0 / 65	▼4	Opposition
1871	None	1 / 65	▲1	Opposition
1872 by-election	None	1 / 75	0	Opposition
1875	None	0 / 75	▼1	Opposition
1878	None	7 / 75	▲7	Opposition
1881	None	9 / 75	▲2	Opposition
1883 by-election	None	14 / 110	▲5	Opposition
1884 by-election	None	15 / 110	▲1	Opposition
1884	None	24 / 110	▲9	Opposition
1887	None	9 / 107	▼15	Opposition
1892	None	8 / 88	▼1	Opposition
1897	United Opposition	15 / 88	▲11*	Opposition
1901	United Opposition	5 / 86	▼10	Opposition
1906	Croat-Serb Coalition	20 / 88	▲15	Government
1908	Croat-Serb Coalition	26 / 88	▲6	Government
*Four members of the Croatian Sabor were lost to the Pure Party of Rights through the 1895 split.

Diet of Dalmatia elections
Election	In coalition with	Seats won	Change	Government
Election	In coalition with	(excluding coalition partners)		Government
1895	None	3 / 43	New	Opposition
1901	None	8 / 43	▲5	Opposition

== Legacy ==
Ante Starčević and the Party of Rights were appropriated by virtually all subsequent Croatian far-right movements as a basis for their ideologies. Since the 1930s, Croatian nationalists normally claimed to be the followers of Ante Starčević without necessarily having had any formal ties with the Party of Rights or any of its factions.

The modern Croatian Party of Rights was established in 1990, in the run-up to the Croatia's first free elections, following the post-World War II communist rule. The organisers announced the event as the "renewal of the Croatian Party of Rights." The modern party claimed to be a continuation of the Party of Rights established in 1861, as well as a continuation of the Frankist party banned in 1929.

== Sources ==
- "Tuškan, Grga". Hrvatska enciklopedija (in Croatian). Miroslav Krleža Institute of Lexicography.
- Banac, Ivo (1984). The National Question in Yugoslavia: Origins, History, Politics. Ithaca: Cornell University Press. ISBN 978-0-8014-1675-0.
- Bartulin, Nevenko (2012). "From Independence to Trialism: The Croatian Party of Right and the Project for a Liberal "Greater Croatia" within the Habsburg Empire, 1861–1914". In Fitzpatrick, Matthew P. (ed.). Liberal Imperialism in Europe. London: Palgrave Macmillan. pp. 115–140. ISBN 978-1-349-43739-9.
- Bellamy, Alex J. (2003). The Formation of Croatian National Identity: A Centuries-old Dream. Manchester: Manchester University Press. ISBN 9780719065026.
- Biondich, Mark (2000). Stjepan Radić, the Croat Peasant Party, and the Politics of Mass Mobilization, 1904-1928. Toronto: University of Toronto Press. ISBN 0-8020-4727-0.
- Brajković, Luka (2024). "Humor i satira: dva "oružja" pravaškoga pokreta" [Humor and Satire: Two "Weapons" of the Rights Movement]. Obnova, časopis za kulturu, društvo i politiku (in Croatian). 19 (1). Zagreb: Udruga Obnova: 58–79. ISSN 2584-4245.
- Diklić, Marijan (2001). "Don Ivo Prodan u Dalmatinskom saboru" [Don Ivo Prodan in the Dalmatian Assembly]. Radovi Zavoda za povijesne znanosti HAZU u Zadru (in Croatian). 43 (43). Zadar: Croatian Academy of Sciences and Arts: 389–457. ISSN 1330-0474.
- Fuerst-Bjeliš, Borna; Glamuzina, Nikola (2021). The Historical Geography of Croatia; Territorial Change and Cultural Landscapes. Cham: Springer. ISBN 978-3-030-68432-7.
- Glenny, Misha (2012). The Balkans, 1804–2012: Nationalism, War and the Great Powers. Toronto: House of Anansi Press. ISBN 978-1-77089-273-6.
- Goldstein, Ivo (1996). "Stjepan Radić i Židovi" [Stjepan Radić and the Jews]. Radovi Zavoda za hrvatsku povijest Filozofskoga fakulteta Sveučilišta u Zagrebu: Radovi Zavoda za hrvatsku povijest Filozofskoga fakulteta Sveučilišta u Zagrebu (in Croatian). 29 (1). Zagreb: University of Zagreb: 208–216. ISSN 0353-295X.
- Gross, Mirjana (1998). "Folnegović, Fran". Croatian Biographical Lexicon (in Croatian). Miroslav Krleža Institute of Lexicography.
- Gross, Mirjana (2000). Izvorno pravaštvo: ideologija, agitacija, pokret [Original Rightism: Ideology, Agitation, Movement] (in Croatian). Zagreb: Golden marketing. ISBN 9789536168828.
- Klaužer, Vedran (2023). ""Pozdrav Starčev i moj… tvoji večno po veri": političko-društveni portret pravaša-plemića Eduarda Halpera Sigetskog (1824. – 1877.)" ["Greetings from Starčević and myself… yours forever by faith:" A Political and Social Portrait of Nobleman Eduard Halper Sigetski (1824–1877), Adherent of the Party of Rights]. Historical contributions = Historische Beiträge (in Croatian). 42 (65). Zagreb: Croatian Institute of History: 163–190. doi:10.22586/pp.v42i65.27518. ISSN 0351-9767.
- Kamusella, Tomasz (2009). The Politics of Language and Nationalism in Modern Central Europe. Palgrave Macmillan. ISBN 978-1-349-36196-0.
- Kent, Sarah A. (2009). "State Ritual and Ritual Parody: Croatian Student Protest and the Limits of Loyalty at the End of the Nineteenth Century". In Cole, Laurence; Unowsky, Daniel (eds.). The Limits of Loyalty: Imperial Symbolism, Popular Allegiances, and State Patriotism in the Late Habsburg Monarchy. New York: Berghahn Books. pp. 162–177. ISBN 978-1-84545-202-5.
- Kolar-Dimitrijević, Mira (1995). "Kako su narodnjaci pobijedili na izborima 1871.? (Nepoznata brošura Ivana Mažuranića?)" [How the Populists Won the Election in 1871? (An Unknown Brochure by Ivan Mažuranić?)]. Historical contributions = Historische Beiträge (in Croatian). 14 (14). Zagreb: Croatian Institute of History: 163–207. ISSN 0351-9767.
- Matković, Stjepan (1996). "Čista stranka prava i stranački izbori na prijelazu 19. u 20. stoljeće" [The Pure Party of Right and Parliamentary Elections at the Turn of the 19th Century]. Povijesni prilozi (in Croatian). 15 (15). Zagreb: Croatian Institute of History: 59–91. ISSN 1848-9087.
- Matković, Stjepan (1997). "Izbori za Hrvatski sabor 1897. godine: afirmacija Khuenove autokracije" [The Elections for Croatian Parliament in 1897:Affirmation of Khuen's Autocracy]. Časopis za suvremenu povijest (in Croatian). 29 (3). Zagreb: Croatian Institute of History: 469–488. ISSN 0590-9597.
- Matković, Stjepan (2024). "Ante Starčević i izbori za Hrvatski sabor" [Ante Starčević and Elections for the Croatian Sabor]. Radovi Zavoda za hrvatsku povijest Filozofskoga fakulteta Sveučilišta u Zagrebu (in Croatian). 56 (1). Zagreb: Faculty of Humanities and Social Sciences, University of Zagreb: 141–162. doi:10.17234/RadoviZHP.56.4. ISSN 0353-295X.
- Miller, Nicholas J. (2010). Between Nation and State: Serbian Politics in Croatia Before the First World War. University of Pittsburgh Press. ISBN 978-0-8229-7722-3.
- Stojarová, Věra (2013). The Far Right in the Balkans. Manchester: Manchester University Press. ISBN 9780719089732.
- Šetić, Nevio (2014). "Odnos istarskih pravaša prema raskolu u Stranci prava Banske Hrvatske 1895" [Relation of the Istrian Members of the Party of Rights Toward the Disunion in the Party of Rights in Ban's Croatia of 1895]. Tabula: časopis Filozofskog fakulteta, Sveučilište Jurja Dobrile u Puli (in Croatian) (12) 137517. Pula: Juraj Dobrila University of Pula: 233–244. doi:10.32728/tab.12.2014.20. ISSN 1331-7830.
- Šimetin Šegvić, Filip; Tokić, Antea (2021). "Kultura časti i nasilje: razvoj i ogled u slučaju "saborskog vritnjaka"" [Culture of Honour and Violence: Development and Reflection in the Case of "Parliamentary Butt Kick"]. Zbornik Odsjeka za povijesne znanosti Zavoda za povijesne i društvene znanosti Hrvatske akademije znanosti i umjetnosti (in Croatian). 39. Zagreb: Croatian Academy of Sciences and Arts: 273–295. doi:10.21857/ypn4ocdv09. ISSN 1330-7134.
- Šokčević, Dinko (2023). "Kasni odjeci teorijske pripreme zavjere: pitanje jednoga političkog plana iz 17. stoljeća u mađarskom (i, neposredno, u hrvatskom) javnom životu 1868. godine i politička pozadina objavljivanja spisa i nastanka znanstvene monografije Gyule Paulera o "Uroti"" [Late Reverberations of Theoretical Preparations for the Conspiracy: A Political Plan from the 17th Century in the Hungarian (and the Croatian) Public Life in 1868; Political Background to the Publication of an Act and the Creation of the Scientific Monograph by Gyula Pauler on the "Conspiracy"]. Rad Hrvatske akademije znanosti i umjetnosti : Razred za društvene znanosti (in Croatian). 57 (57=560). Zagreb: Croatian Academy of Sciences and Arts: 59–74. doi:10.21857/mwo1vcrpey. ISSN 1848-7904.
- Tanner, Marcus (2010). Croatia: A Nation Forged in War (3rd ed.). New Haven: Yale University Press. ISBN 978-0-300-16394-0.
- Trutanić, Jure (2021). "David Starčević u raskolu Stranke prava 1895" [David Starčević and the 1895 Schism in the Party of Right]. Radovi Zavoda za hrvatsku povijest Filozofskoga fakulteta Sveučilišta u Zagrebu (in Croatian). 53 (2). Zagreb: Faculty of Humanities and Social Sciences, University of Zagreb: 179–204. doi:10.17234/RadoviZHP.53.21. ISSN 0353-295X.
- Turkalj, Jasna (2004). "Stranka prava i izbori za Hrvatski sabor na području bivše Vojne krajine 1883. godine" [The Party of Right and the Elections for the Croatian Diet in the Newly Joined Military Border Territory in 1883]. Časopis za suvremenu povijest (in Croatian). 36 (3). Zagreb: Croatian Institute of History: 1013–1037. ISSN 0590-9597.
- Turkalj, Jasna (2011). "Dr. Juraj Žerjavić – "spiritus agens" izbornoga pokreta i "bune" u Mariji Bistrici 1892. godine?!" [Dr. Juraj Žerjavić – Spiritus Agens of the Electoral Movement and "Rebellion" in Marija Bistrica in 1892]. Croatica Christiana Periodica (in Croatian). 35 (67). Zagreb: Catholic Faculty of Theology, University of Zagreb: 125–142. ISSN 0350-7823.
- Veselinović, Velimir (2014). "Obnavljanje i djelovanje Hrvatske stranke prava, 1990–1992" [Renewal and Political Activism of the Croatian Party of Rights (HSP), 1990–1992]. Politička misao: časopis za politologiju (in Croatian). 51 (2). Zagreb: Faculty of Political Science, University of Zagreb: 55–87. ISSN 0032-3241.
- Veselinović, Velimir (2018). "Pregled razvoja pravaške ideologije i politike" [An Overview of the Development of Rightist Ideology and Politics]. Časopis za suvremenu povijest (in Croatian). 50 (3). Zagreb: Croatian Institute of History: 583–620. doi:10.22586/csp.v50i3.105. ISSN 0590-9597.
