= Mile Starčević (politician, born 1862) =

Croatian politician and lawyer (1862–1917)

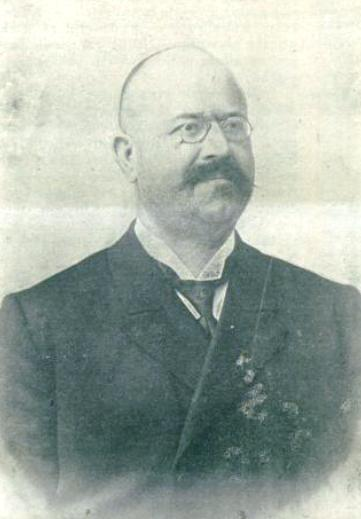
- Born: 29 September 1862; Veliki Žitnik, Gospić, Croatian Military Frontier, Austrian Empire (now Croatia)
- Died: 10 March 1917 (aged 54); Zagreb, Kingdom of Croatia-Slavonia, Austria-Hungary (now Croatia)
- Education: University of Zagreb
- Occupations: Politician, lawyer
- Political party: Party of Rights (until 1895); Pure Party of Rights (1895–1908); Milinovci (1908–1913)

Mile Starčević (29 September 1862 – 10 March 1917) was a Croatian politician and lawyer. He was an elected member of the Sabor of the Kingdom of Croatia-Slavonia in 1892–1917 as a member of the Party of Rights or one of parties created through splintering of the Party of Rights. Born in the village of Veliki Žitnik near Gospić, Starčević advocated solving the Croatian question within the framework of trialism in Austria-Hungary. Following a political clash within the Party of Rights, Starčević left the party (together with his relative Ante Starčević, Josip Frank, and Eugen Kumičić) to form the Pure Party of Rights. After a conflict with Frank, in 1908 Mile Starčević formed a new political party known as the Milinovci (formally the Starčević's Party of Rights) in reference to the founder. In 1912, the Milinovci abandoned trialism and became allied with the Croat-Serb Coalition led by Frano Supilo and Svetozar Pribičević. During World War I, Mile Starčević left politics. He died in Zagreb.

Historiography normally refers to Ante and Mile Starčević as uncle and nephew. The two were first cousins once removed; Mile's grandfather David and Ante's father Jakov were brothers. Regardless, Mile Starčević referred to Ante as "uncle", and Ante referred to Mile (as well as to Mile's brother David Starčević) as "nephew" and historiography generally accepted those labels.
