= Ivan Banjavčić =

Croatian politician and philanthropist

Ivan Banjavčić (May 29, 1843 - October 7, 1913) was a Croatian politician and philanthropist.

Born in Barilović, Banjavčić became a fervent follower of Ante Starčević of the Party of Rights and acted as the leader of the party in Karlovac. His law firm, at which the writer Ante Kovačić also worked for a period, contributed to the party's work for over three decade.

From 1877 to 1906 he was Karlovac's representative in the Croatian Parliament (Sabor) as a member of the Party of Rights. Banjavčić was also the first mayor of the enlarged city of Karlovac after municipalities of Banija and Švarča were unified to it. During his time as mayor the city received an electric power plant on the Kupa river near Ozalj. A modern waterworks were created, as well as a sewer system.

Banjavčić died in Heidelberg, Germany in 1913, leaving his entire estate to Matica hrvatska.

== Sources ==
- Banjavčić, Ivan at Proleksis enciklopedija, Miroslav Krleža Lexicographical Institute (in Croatian)
