= David Starčević =

Croatian politician (1840–1908)

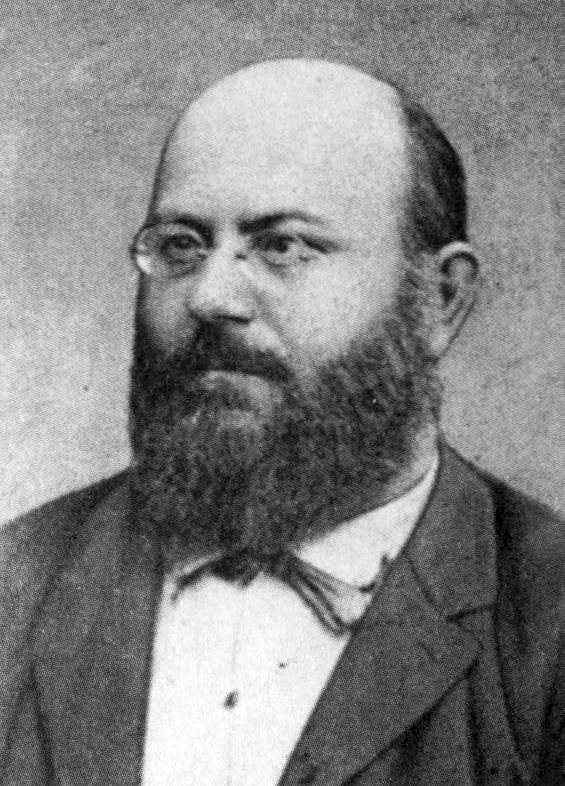

Leader of the Opposition
- In office 1881–1885
- Monarch: Franz Joseph I of Austria
- Prime Minister: Teodor Pejačević (until 1883) Károly Khuen-Héderváry
- Succeeded by: Josip Frank

Personal details
- Born: 1840 Veliki Žitnik, Gospić, Croatia-Slavonia, Austrian Empire
- Died: 18 November 1908 (aged 67–68) Jastrebarsko, Croatia-Slavonia, Austria-Hungary
- Party: Party of Rights, Pure Party of Rights
- Relations: Ante Starčević Mile Starčević
- Education: Eötvös Loránd University
- Occupation: Politician
- Profession: Lawyer

David Starčević (1840 – November 18, 1908) was a Croatian politician and prominent member of the Party of Rights.

== Biography ==
Starčević was born in Žitnik near Gospić in 1840. He is a relative of Ante Starčević, one of the most significant Croatian politicians who was one of the founders of the Party of Rights. He attended gymnasium in Zagreb, but in 1871 he was expelled due to suspicion that he was involved in the Rakovica Revolt, started by other founder of the Party of Rights, Eugen Kvaternik. After he was expelled from the Zagreb gymnasium, he attended Eötvös Loránd University in Budapest and gained doctorate in law. In 1873 he started to work as a lawyer in Jastrebarsko. He became one of the most active members of the Party of Rights after party's activity was renewed in 1878. In 1881 he gained seat in Sabor, Croatian parliament. He was fierce opponent of Károly Khuen-Héderváry, who was at the time Ban of Croatia which made him the most popular in the opposition. On 5 October 1885 he attacked Héderváry by grabbing his neck and one of his party colleagues kicked him in his breeches. The event was very popular in Croatia and Starčević boasted with this action. Héderváry denied such event and Starčević was sentenced for six months in prison because of slander, Starčević was also expelled from parliament. After conflict in the Party of Rights, he remained with the majority (known as the Domovinaši) led by Fran Folnegović, but later he joined Pure Party of Rights led by Josip Frank (the Frankists). Soon, Starčević left the political life. He died in Jastrebarsko on 18 November 1908.

Historiography normally refers to Ante and David Starčević as uncle and nephew. The two were first cousins once removed - David's grandfather (also named David) and Ante's father Jakov were brothers. Regardless, David referred to Ante as "uncle", and Ante referred to David (as well as to David's brother Mile Starčević) as "nephew" and historiography generally accepted those labels.
