= 1908 Croatian parliamentary election =

- 27–28 February 1908

88 seats in the Sabor
- Turnout: 73.51%
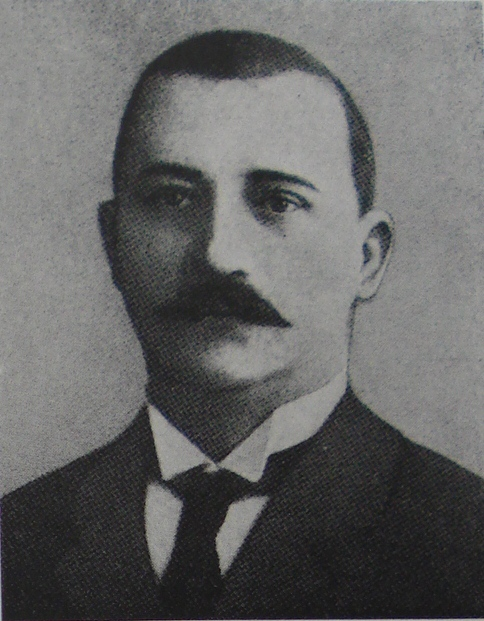

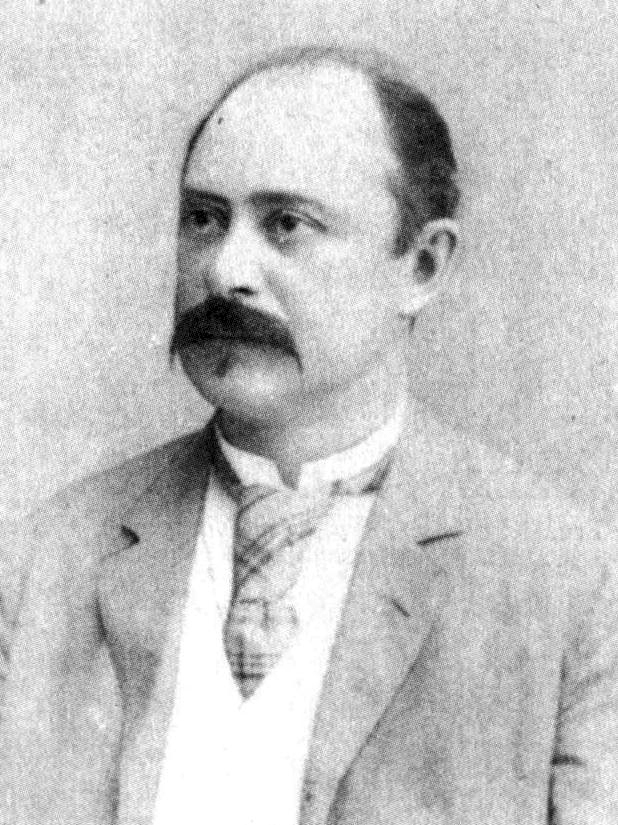
	First party	Second party
Leader	Frano Supilo	Josip Frank
Party	Croat-Serb Coalition	Frankists
Seats won	56 / 88	24 / 88
Seat change	▲24	▲5
Popular vote	17,723	9,254
Percentage	49.64%	25.92%
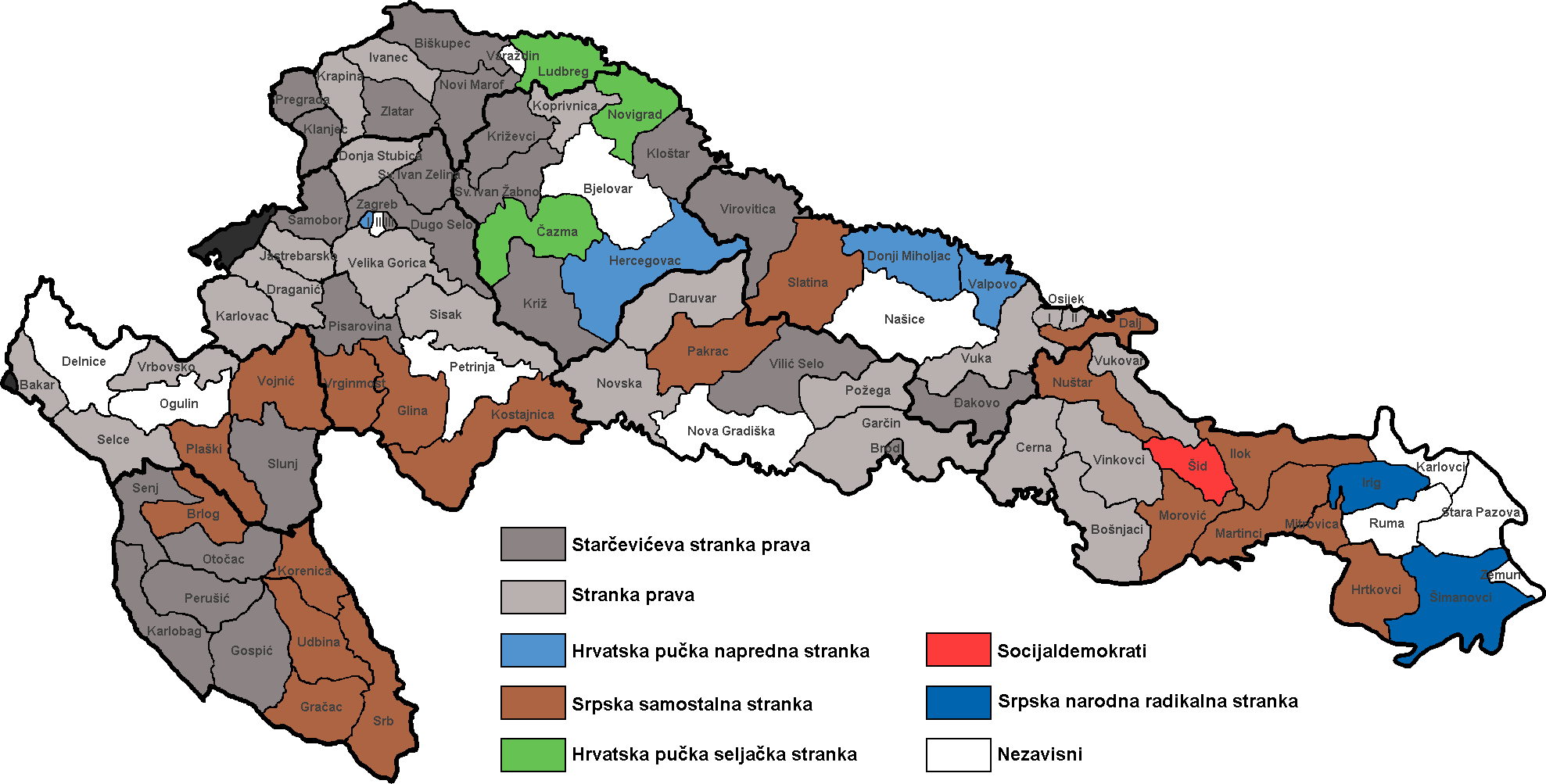
- Results of the election in each of the electoral districts in 8 counties of the Kingdom of Croatia-Slavonia: the party with the plurality of votes in each district. Frankists Party of Rights; Serb Independent Party Croatian Peoples' Peasant Party; Croatian People's Progressive Party Social-Democrats Serb People's Radical Party Independent

Early parliamentary elections were held in the Kingdom of Croatia-Slavonia on 27 and 28 February 1908, after being called by Ban Pavao Rauch.

== Results ==
Party or alliance		Votes	%	Seats
Croat-Serb Coalition	Party of Rights	9,387	26.29	23
Croat-Serb Coalition	Serb Independent Party	3,088	8.65	19
Croat-Serb Coalition	Independent Club	3,720	10.42	10
Croat-Serb Coalition	Croatian People's Progressive Party	1,528	4.28	4
Croat-Serb Coalition	Total	17,723	49.64	56
Frankists		9,254	25.92	24
Serb People's Radical Party		3,006	8.42	2
Constitutional Party		1,729	4.84	0
Croatian People's Peasant Party		1,135	3.18	3
Social Democratic Party of Croatia and Slavonia		837	2.34	1
Independents		2,021	5.66	2
Total		35,705	100.00	88
Registered voters/turnout		48,572	–	

=== Elected representatives ===
Constituency	Elected Deputy	Party
Zagreb I	Đuro Šurmin	Croatian People's Progressive Party
Zagreb II	Miroslav Kulmer	Independent Club
Zagreb III	Ivan Peršić	Frankists
