= 1897 Croatian parliamentary election =

Parliamentary elections were held in the Kingdom of Croatia-Slavonia from 19 to 22 May 1897. The People's Party emerged as the victor.

== Background ==
The 1897 elections were held during the autocratic rule of Croatian ban Károly Khuen-Héderváry. His primary task as the ban of Croatia was to preserve the Croatian-Hungarian union. Héderváry had maintained good relations with the Hungarian Liberal Party, while he relied on the People's Party in Croatia to maintain the status quo. Héderváry's supporters had won the parliament majority in each of the three previous elections held during his reign, in 1884, 1887 and 1892. At the time of the election, the People's Party held the parliamentary majority.

Under the electoral law, only 2% of the nation's citizens could vote, i.e. men over thirty years old, who could pay 30 forints in tax. Furthermore, Héderváry had gerrymandered the districts to favour different ethnic groups and resorted to divide and rule policies, stoking antagonism between the Serbs and the Croats, as he suspected that any cooperation between them might threaten Austro-Hungarian interests in the Balkans and allow expansion of the Kingdom of Serbia into the empire's territories inhabited by the South Slavs.

Ban Khuen-Héderváry was unpopular with large groups of Croatian citizens for several reasons: he had suppressed Croatian nationalism, aimed at magyarization of the railways and administration, imposing the Hungarian language at schools, settling Hungarian people in areas of Croatia, as well as lessening local autonomy.

== Campaign ==
The People's Party presented itself as allies of Héderváry and the Croatian-Hungarian Party. The opposition to the People's Party was at the time fragmented, as the Party of Rights had split into the mainstream Party of Rights (also known as Domovinaši) and the minority Pure Party of Rights. In August 1896, the Domovinaši and the Independent People's Party formed a coalition. Another opposition party was the Social Democratic Party of Croatia and Slavonia; however, due to their small size they were not a major player in the elections.

== Results ==
Party or alliance		Seats	+/–
People's Party		59	–18
Unified Opposition	Party of Rights	15	+7
Unified Opposition	Independent People's Party	11	New
Pure Party of Rights		2	New
Independents		1	0
Total		88	0

=== Elected representatives ===
==== Party of Rights ====
- Josip Frank
- Mile Starčević

== Sources ==
- Ivo Perić: Hrvatski državni sabor: 1848-2000, GIPA, Zagreb 2002.
