= 1901 Dalmatian parliamentary election =

- 1901
- All 41 seats in the Diet of Dalmatia
Party	Seats	+/–
People's Party	18	−5
Party of Rights	9	+6
Serb People's Party	6	−3
Autonomist Party	6	0
Pure Party of Rights	2	New
This lists parties that won seats. See the complete results below.

Parliamentary elections were held in the Kingdom of Dalmatia in 1901.

== Results ==
Party	Seats	+/–
People's Party	18	–5
Party of Rights	9	+6
Serb People's Party	6	–3
Autonomist Party	6	0
Pure Party of Rights	2	New
Total	41	0
