= 1895 Dalmatian parliamentary election =

- 1895
- All 41 seats in the Diet of Dalmatia
Party	Seats	+/–
People's Party	23	−3
Serb People's Party	9	0
Autonomist Party	6	0
Party of Rights	3	New
This lists parties that won seats. See the complete results below.

Parliamentary elections were held in the Kingdom of Dalmatia in 1895.

== Results ==
Party	Seats	+/–
People's Party	23	–3
Serb People's Party	9	0
Autonomist Party	6	0
Party of Rights	3	New
Total	41	0

== Bibliography ==
- Diklić, Marjan (2001). "Don Ivo Prodan u Dalmatinskom saboru" (PDF). Radovi Zavoda za povijesne znanosti HAZU u Zadru (in Croatian) (43): 389–457.
