= Juraj Rukavina Vidovgradski (politician) =

Croatian politician and soldier

Juraj (Gjuro) Rukavina Vidovgradski
- Born: 4 February 1834; Trnovec Manor, Krapinske Toplice, Kingdom of Croatia, Austrian Empire (now Croatia)
- Died: 30 December 1915 (aged 81)
- Education: Theresian Military Academy
- Occupations: Soldier, politician
- Political party: Party of Rights
- Relatives: Juraj Rukavina Vidovgradski

Baron Juraj (Gjuro) Rukavina Vidovgradski (4 February 1834 – 30 December 1915) was a Croatian politician and soldier. He was born in the Trnovec Manor near Krapinske Toplice to Alfred, deputy Varaždin County prefect in Sveti Križ Začretje as one of eight siblings. His grandfather was General of the Artillery Juraj Rukavina Vidovgradski. He attended school in Varaždin before enrolling in and graduating from the Theresian Military Academy. He served in the military, rising to the rank of Oberleutnant. Rukavina left the service by 1861 when he met Ante Starčević, the leader and founder of the Party of Rights. Rukavina became a party member and was elected on the party ticket to the Sabor of the Kingdom of Croatia-Slavonia. He also became the president of the Club of the Party of Rights, a leading body of the party, while Starčević retained the overall leadership of the party. Rukavina was the leader of the party members from his native region of Hrvatsko Zagorje. He left the party in 1895 following a conflict with Josip Frank, but he became member once again after Frank and his faction split from the party to form the Pure Party of Rights. Rukavina died in 1915, survived by son Amon.

In 1873, Rukavina became the president of the First Reading-Room in Zlatar.
