= Frano Supilo =

Croatian politician and journalist (1870–1917)

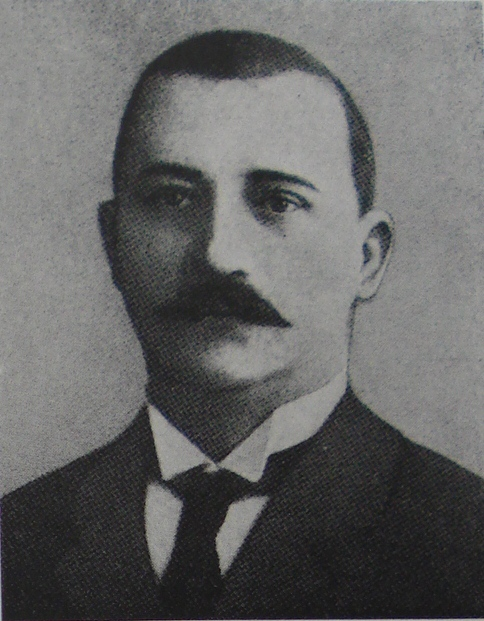

Member of Parliament
- In office May 1906 – October 1910
- Monarch: Franz Joseph I

Personal details
- Born: 30 November 1870 Cavtat, Dalmatia, Austria-Hungary
- Died: 25 September 1917 (aged 46) London, England
- Resting place: Dubrovnik City Hall, Croatia
- Party: Party of Rights
- Other political affiliations: Croat-Serb Coalition
- Occupation: Politician, Journalist

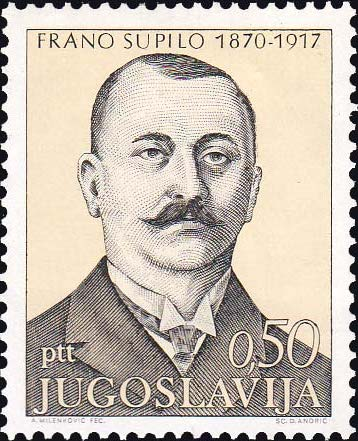
Frano Supilo on a 1971 Yugoslavian stamp

Frano Supilo (30 November 1870 – 25 September 1917) was a Croatian politician and journalist. He opposed the Austro-Hungarian domination of Europe prior to World War I. He participated in the debates leading to the formation of Yugoslavia as a member of the Yugoslav Committee. The author, R. A. Stradling, calls him "one of the most capable Croatian politicians ever."

== Early years ==
Supilo was born in Cavtat on 30 November 1870.

He completed elementary education in Dubrovnik. He had to drop out of naval high school because of a lack of funds, and instead finished a two-year school of agriculture with Frano Gondola. He traveled around Dalmatian vineyards educating wine-growers on peronospora.

In 1890, he started work at Crvena Hrvatska ('Red Croatia') in Dubrovnik. It was a social/political paper based on the ideas of the Croatian Party of Rights and fighting for the unification of Dalmatia with Croatia.

Supilo played the main role in changing the public opinion, which expressed itself in several elections that brought down the Autonomous Party (pro-Italian) and Serbian coalition that had gained power in the municipality of Dubrovnik in the 1880s with the support of the Habsburg court, which followed the policy of divide et impera. He became one of the leaders of the Croatian Party of Rights in 1895. After the party split, he campaigned against Josip Frank.

In 1900, he worked in Rijeka as the commissioner of the party's Dalmatian. Also, in 1900 he became the editor of Novi list in Rijeka.

== The Croato-Serb Coalition ==
Along with Ante Trumbić and Josip Smodlaka, he was one of the creators of the New Course Policy, the Rijeka Resolution; and the Croat-Serb Coalition, both in 1905.

He was also responsible for Croat-Serb Coalition's rise to power. Supilo's Rijeka and Zagreb faze have historically and continuously been analysed only when the studies and books have started to appear after the fall of SFRJ - that is because up until then his work has been continuously treated as a visionary activity towards his hearts agenda, and even back then in Yugoslavia (communistic), a serious dream of the creation of a united country of Croats and Serbs. A good example of the newest appreciation of Supilo's political activity is a series of shorter texts published in the magazine Kolo, 1998., nm. 8. In short notes - Supilo has taken the traditional right wing politics and made a radical turn based on two important entries: ideological and pragmatically - ideological.

On the major playground, Supilo becomes a supporter of a softer Yugoslavian unitarism (because of which he was often demonised in Croatian circles). Supilo's opinion (which was then shared by a large portion of Croatian and Serbian intelligence) had been that Croats and Serbs (to which he later added Slovenes as well) are one three - tribal people - therefore, not three tribes, even less three nations, but one Yugoslavian nation with three names. That, from the modern perspective an unusual idea, was a sign of the late national crystallisation on the Croatian side (in less parts Serbs and Slovenes - not to mention Macedonians and Montenegrins), as well as the territorial bubbles of Serbs and Croats, together with the fact Croatian and Serbian traditional languages have been exquisitely similar and inter - understandable on the conversational level. Practically, this has meant the creation of the Croato-Serb coalition, a creation by which the Serbs are recognised, de facto, as political people inside of Croatia, for the first time in history.

A stronger change has been signified by the negotiations between the coalition and Supilo with the Hungarian and Italian politicians from Austro-Hungarian monarchy. Supilo has tried to convert traditional Croatian enemies into Croatian allies within the fight for universal democratisation of monarchy in which he believed that all nations would be winners. But he made a mistake in his prognosis: the Italian and Hungarian imperialism were so strongly and deeply rooted into the consciences of the nationalistic elites of those people that only the World Wars were able to crumble down those views.

When it comes to Serbian nationalism, Supilo did not in that period realistically understand the stubbornness and deflections of Serbian territorial agendas on practically the whole Bosnia and Hercegovina and Croatia. On the consequential elections in 1906., on which the Coalition has won, Supilo was chosen as a representative in the Croatian Parliament and became the leading person of the Coalition. When the Hungarian parliament in spring 1907. voted the Trainline Pragmati, in which the Hungarian language is voted as the official language on all train lines in Croatia, Supilo translated the Croatian disagreement to the Hungarian parliament and led a difficult campaign against the Hungarian ban Pavlo Rauch, and started to propose essential constitutional questions about the position of Croatia. His radical approach brings him into a conflict with the leadership of the Coalition, which wanted a more careful politic, in order not to lose the ability of returning to power.

Supilo was aiming for Croatia, with its own politics, to step up as the head of South Slaven Austro-Hungarian in the fight for their union - while the Serbian part of the Coalition was for appropriating Croatia to the Kingdom of Serbia, which in reality meant turning Croatia into a Serbian political appendage.

His attitude struck a serious reaction in Austrian circles. Even though the deceits against him have subsequently been exposed, Supilo stepped out of the Coalition in order to ease its position; the Coalitions then agreed to a compromised way of solving conflict, which led to the fall of ban Rauch, as well as the fall of the Coalition pact with the unnamed ban Nikola Tomasevic.

The coalition has since then, and up until the fall of monarchy and creation of the Kingdom of Serbs, Croatian and Slovenes (1918), fallen down on the weapon in hand of the most influential Croatian pragmatic politician of the time, proponent of unitarism Svetozar Pribićević, whose primary goal was the wait of the fall of the monarchy and definite union with the Serbs. Supilo condemned the opportunistic politic of the Coalition leadership because he believed it was compromising Croatia and was not aiming for Croatia to be equal with Serbia in its fight for unity. In that he was right - the Pribicevic goal was not for Croatia to be as such in the Yugoslavian country.

== Unitarization ==
Ideologically, Supilo became the proponent of a Yugoslav unitarism. He held that Croats and Serbs (and later Slovenes) were a single people with three "tribes". This idea was shared by many of his contemporaries, based on the late national awakening of Croats, Serbs and Slovenes (not to mention Macedonians, Bosniaks and Montenegrins), the territorial closeness of Serbs and Croats, and the facts that the two peoples have very similar official languages. In practice, it meant the creation of a coalition that virtually recognized Serbs as a political entity in Croatia for the first time in its history.

An even stronger turn was the negotiation of the coalition and Supilo with the Hungarian and Italian politicians from Austria-Hungary. It was a brave and innovative move, but proved unsuccessful. Supilo played on the temporary conflict between the Vienna court and the Italian irredentists and Hungarian imperialists, the traditional Croatian opponents who claimed their rights to some Croatian lands. He wanted to turn them into Croatian allies in the fight for the general democratization of the monarchy, which he believed would profit all peoples. But he estimated wrongly: the Italian and Hungarian imperialism was so deeply entrenched that it fell only after the world wars. As for Serbian nationalism, Supilo did not realize how stubborn were Serbian territorial claims over large parts of Bosnia and Herzegovina and Croatia.

When the Croat-Serb Coalition won the elections of 1906, Supilo became a representative in the Croatian parliament and the leading figure of the Coalition. When the Hungarian parliament in spring 1907 decided that Hungarian would be the official language of the Croatian railroads, Supilo led the Croatian opposition in obstructing actions in the Hungarian parliament. He waged a strong campaign against the ban Levin Rauch, who supported the Hungarians. Supilo also initiated the fundamental constitutional issues on the status of Croatia. His radical attitude brought him in conflict with the Coalition leadership, which promoted a more careful policy with a view of another mandate.

Supilo tried to bring Croatian policy to the forefront of the South Slavs of Austria-Hungary in their fight for unification, while the Serbian part of the Coalition and some of its Croatian members wanted to harmonize Croatian policy with the Kingdom of Serbia, which would bring Croatia to a politically inferior position in relation to Serbia. At the time of the "High Treason Trial" (1909), the politically motivated trial against the Serb public officials in the monarchy, initiated by the Viennese court because of the crisis around the annexation of Bosnia and Herzegovina in 1908, Supilo advocated a strong support of Croats to the endangered Serbs to preserve the harmony of Croats and Serbs based on the principles from the Rijeka Resolution and the Zadar Resolution.

Heinrich Friedjung tried to discredit Supilo by forging documents that said Supilo was working on behalf of Serbia. Thomas Masaryk proved they were forgeries at a trial in 1909. Supilo left the Croat-Serb Coalition in 1910.

== World War I ==
After the assassination of Archduke Franz Ferdinand of Austria, he fled to Florence, Italy where on 22 November 1914 he formed the Yugoslav Committee with Ante Trumbić and Ivan Meštrović to lobby for independence from Austria-Hungary. The organization then moved to London, England in 1915. He resigned from the committee in June 1916, but endorsed the Declaration of Corfu that created the Kingdom of Serbs, Croats and Slovenes.

== Death ==
While in exile in London, Supilo experienced a nervous breakdown and was committed to a psychiatric hospital. He died of a stroke at the institution on 25 September 1917, at the age of 47.

== Legacy ==
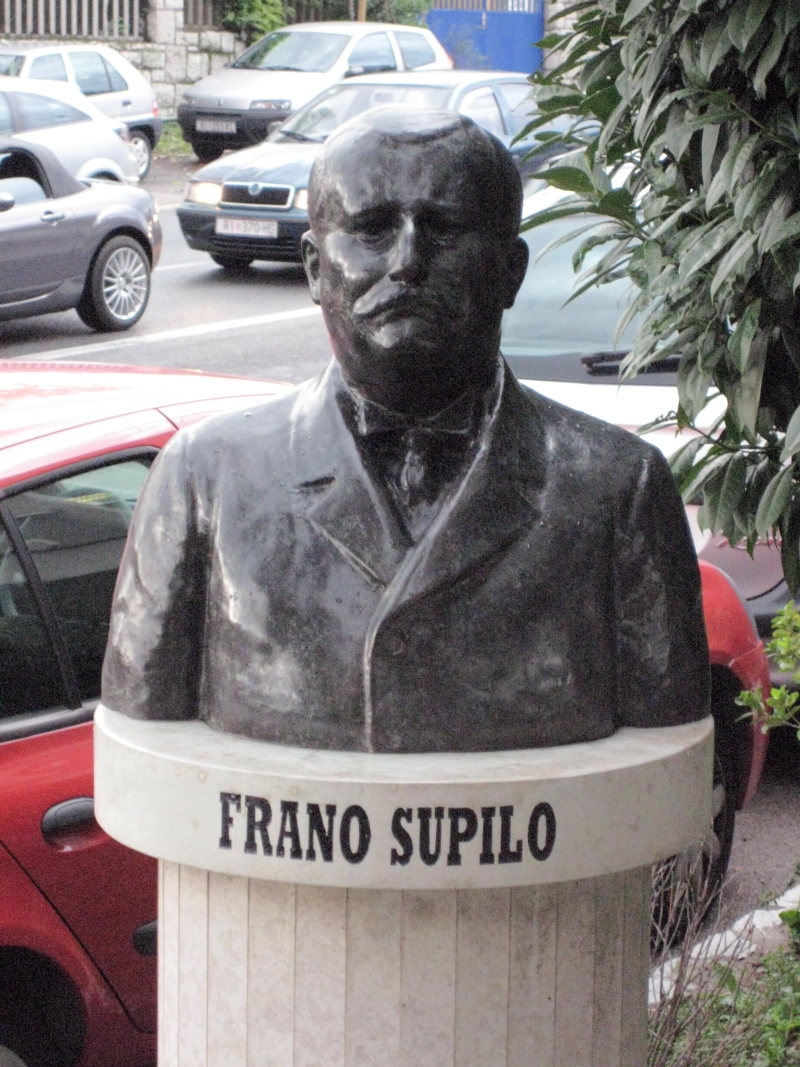
Bust of Frano Supilo in Rijeka

His death was immortalized by Krleža in his Ballads of Petrica Kerempuh: "Sopilovog Frana,/kem serce pregrizla horvacka je rana" (Frano Supilo, whose heart was eaten by the Croatian wound).

Novi list, still the most popular daily newspaper in Rijeka to this day, credits Frano Supilo as the newspaper's founder in its masthead with the words, "Utemeljio Frano Supilo 2. siječnja 1900." ("Founded by Frano Supilo on January 2nd 1900"). A bronze bust of Supilo is located outside the newspaper's headquarters building in Rijeka's Mlaka neighborhood.

== Works ==
In Croatian:

- Politika u Hrvatskoj (Politics in Croatia), reprint, Zagreb, 1953
- Politički spisi, članci, govori (Political writings, articles, speeches), Zagreb, 1970
- Izabrani politički spisi (Selected political writings), GM, Zagreb, 2000
