= Croat-Serb Coalition =

Croat-Serb Coalition Hrvatsko-srpska koalicija Хрватско-српска коалиција
- Founders: Frano Supilo and Svetozar Pribićević
- Founded: 1905; 121 years ago
- Dissolved: 1918; 108 years ago
- Merged into: Yugoslav Democratic Party
- Headquarters: Zagreb, Croatia-Slavonia
- Ideology: Pan-Slavism; Conservative liberalism Yugoslavism
- Political position: Centre-right

The Croat-Serb Coalition (Serbo-Croatian: Hrvatsko-srpska koalicija/Хрватско-српска коалиција) was a major political alliance in Austria-Hungary during the early 20th century that governed the Croatian lands, the crownlands of Croatia-Slavonia and Dalmatia. It represented the political idea of a cooperation of Croats and Serbs in Austria-Hungary for mutual benefit. Its main leaders were, at first Frano Supilo and Svetozar Pribićević, then Pribićević alone.

This coalition governed the Kingdom of Croatia-Slavonia from 1903 until the dissolution of the Austria-Hungary and the Yugoslav unification in 1918, when it was by and large integrated into the liberal Yugoslav Democratic Party.

== Origins ==
The previous incarnation of Croat-Serb cooperation in the historical Croatian lands under Austro-Hungarian rule had happened sixty years earlier in the Illyrian movement; its proponents advocated the unification of South Slavs in the Habsburg monarchy under an autonomous Croatian kingdom. The idea came to an abrupt end with the revolution of 1848.

The underlying reason for the formation of the Coalition in the early 1900s was the mass realization that the Hungarian and Austrian governments as well as the Italian irredentists all profit from the divisions between the Croats and the Serbs. This became particularly apparent following the popular demonstrations against the Croatian ban Khuen Hedervary in 1903, where the masses of Croat peasants were joined by Serb peasants, and achieved a greater effect. The Coalition itself originated in the Resolutions of Rijeka and Zadar of October 1905 approving the New Course Policy, wherein the groups of individual Croat and Serb parliamentary representatives formulated requests for the improvement of Croat and Serb national interests, respectively, focused on the integration of Dalmatia with Croatia-Slavonia and the elevation of the country's position within the monarchy.

== Alliance activity ==
Frano Supilo	Svetozar Pribićević

The parties which initially joined the Coalition included: Croatian Party of Rights, Croatian People's Progressive Party (the liberals), Serb People's Independent Party, Serb People's Radical Party and Social Democratic Party of Croatia and Slavonia. By this time, the Croatian Party of Rights had also included members of the Independent People's Party, who had previously split from the pro-Hungarian mainstream faction of the People's Party. On December 11, 1905, the Coalition representatives published their political programme. Its declaration promoted equality between Serbs and Croats, constitutional rule and civic rights, local autonomy, and reforms of the Nagodba, the Austro-Hungarian pact which governed Croatia's political status.

In the 1906 Croatian parliamentary election they won a majority of seats in the Parliament (Sabor) of the Kingdom of Croatia-Slavonia. The coalition supported the separation of church and state, opposing clergy participation in politics. Its initial goal was to get rid of the governing National party, seeing German-Austrian domination as a threat, while long-term it sought the unification of South Slavs.

The Social Democrats and Serb Radicals would later break away from the Coalition, while in 1910 Croatian Party of Rights and the Croatian People's Progressive Party merged into the Croat Independent Party (Hrvatska samostalna stranka).

In 1908, the Coalition won the election again, but it also came under attack from the Vienna Imperial Court, which accused its leadership of grand treason. In 1909, 53 members of the Serb Independent Party were put on trial for collaboration with Serbia. In this politically motivated trial, known as the Agram Trial, the defendants were found guilty with flimsy evidence and given prison sentences. As the international political situation shifted (the Serbian government recognized Austria-Hungary's annexation of Bosnia-Herzegovina), the members were pardoned by Franz Joseph in 1910. This came at a cost of having to marginalize their leader Frano Supilo and having to temper their criticism of the government in the Kingdom of Hungary. Svetozar Pribićević became the new leader and closed a formal agreement with the government in 1913. The Coalition continued to win elections in 1910 and 1913. It dominated Croatian South Slavic politics throughout World War I. While the leaders of the Coalition continued to participate in Austro-Hungarian politics, they also participated in the Yugoslav Committee during World War I.

When the war ended and the State of Slovenes, Croats and Serbs was formed, the Coalition fielded 12 representatives in the National Council of the State. Later the Kingdom of Serbs, Croats and Slovenes was formed, and the party dissolved and its former members mostly became advocates of the new government in Belgrade, within the Yugoslav Democratic Party.

== Electoral performances ==
Year	%	Seats won	±	Croat^{[H SS]}		Serb^{[S SS]}		Ind.		Government
1906	36.36%	32 / 88	▲32	18 / 88	▲18	8 / 88	▲8	6 / 88	▲6	Government
1908	49.64%	56 / 88	▲24	27 / 88	▲9	19 / 88	▲11	10 / 88	▲4	Government
1910	33.60%	35 / 88	▼21	18 / 88	▼9	15 / 88	▼4	2 / 88	▼8	Government
1911	28.56%	24 / 88	▼11	12 / 88	▼6	12 / 88	▼3	0 / 88	▼2	Government
1913	39.09%	48 / 88	▲24	29 / 88	▲17	17 / 88	▲5	2 / 88	▲2	Government

^{H SS} In 1910 Frano Supilo' Party of Rights and Croatian People's Progressive Party merged into the Croat Independent Party.
^{S SS} At the 1906 elections Serb Independent Party run along with Serb People's Radical Party, which left the coalition in 1907.

== Legacy ==
The Peasant-Democratic Coalition (Croatian Peasant Party and Independent Democratic Party) led by Stjepan Radić and Svetozar Pribićević (later Vladko Maček alone) during the Kingdom of Yugoslavia is generally seen as a recreation of the Croat-Serb Coalition. The coalition existed from 1927 until Yugoslavia was invaded by Axis powers in 1941 and the start of World War II in Yugoslavia.
