= Serb People's Radical Party =

Serb political party in Austria-Hungary

Serb People's Radical Party Српска народна радикална странка Srpska narodna radikalna stranka
- Leader: Jaša Tomić; Žarko Miladinović; Milan Nedeljković
- Founded: 1887
- Dissolved: 1919
- Ideology: Yugoslavism; Serbian nationalism; Conservatism
- Political position: Centre-right

The Serbian People's Radical Party (Serbian: Српска народна радикална странка, Srpska narodna radikalna stranka) was an ethnic Serb political party in Austria-Hungary. It was founded in 1887 in Novi Sad, but later disbanded in 1919. The party was a more radical fork of the Serbian People's Liberal Party, and also a sister party of the People's Radical Party in Serbia.

It was one of the founders of the Serbo-Croat coalition (1905) that governed the Kingdom of Croatia-Slavonia, but it left the Coalition soon afterwards.

In 1918, it had two representatives in the National Council of Slovenes, Croats and Serbs.

== Sources ==
- Ćirković, Sima (2004). The Serbs. Malden: Blackwell Publishing. ISBN 9781405142915.
- Miller, Nicholas J. (1997). Between Nation and State: Serbian Politics in Croatia Before the First World War. Pittsburgh: University of Pittsburgh Press.
