= People's Party (Kingdom of Croatia) =

People's Party Narodna stranka
- Founder: Ljudevit Gaj; Ivan Kukuljević Sakcinski; Ivan Mažuranić
- Founded: 1841
- Dissolved: 1918
- Headquarters: Zagreb
- Newspaper: Narodne novine
- Ideology: Liberalism; Illyrianism

The People's Party (Croatian: Narodna stranka) was a political party in the Habsburg Kingdom of Croatia and the Kingdom of Croatia-Slavonia.

It was founded in 1841 based on Croatian Illyrian movement. Because the movement did not distinguish Croats from other South Slavs and instead called them all Illyrians, the party was named the Illyrian Party (Ilirska stranka) when it was formed in late 1841, and it participated in the councils of Varaždin County and Bjelovar-Križevci County. It was one of the two parties in the 1843 session of the Croatian Parliament.

Some of its champions from this time included Janko Drašković, Ivan Kukuljević Sakcinski, Josip Juraj Strossmayer and Ivan Mažuranić.

== July victims ==
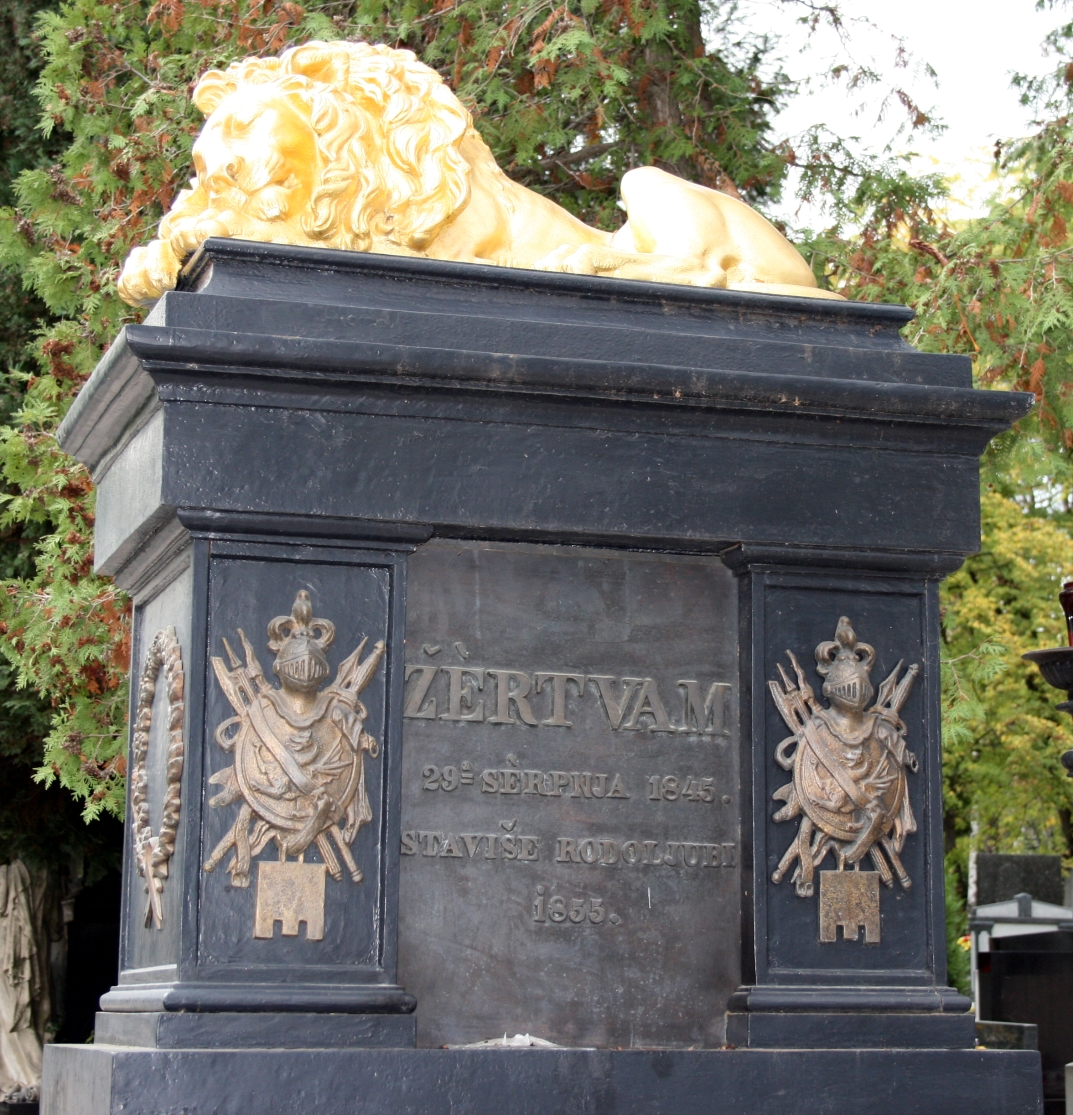
In 1855, a monument was erected for the July victims in Zagreb.

The July victims (Croatian: Srpanjske žrtve) were members of the Croatian People's Party who fell victim to a crackdown by the Austrian Imperial Army on July 29, 1845. With the restoration of Zagreb County, local elections were held around the Croatian capital Zagreb. When it was announced that the Hungarian-allied candidate won, members of the People's Party took to St. Mark's Square to protest the result. The Croatian ban, ethnic Hungarian Franz Haller called on the Austrian army to empty the square.

When the army moved in to empty the square, one of its officers was attacked by a protester. The army then moved in with force. In the end, thirteen of the People's Party's protesters were killed and 27 were injured. Due in large part to this incident, ban Haller left his post and bishop Juraj Haulik took his place soon after.

This incident showed the tension developed between Croats who supported the Illyrian movement and the restoration of a unified Croatian Kingdom, and Hungarian-Croatians (Magyars) and some Croats who supported closer relations with Hungary (represented by the Croatian-Hungarian Party). In the following years, Croatia did gain some concessions as Croatian replaced Latin as the nation's official language.

== Later history ==
In 1861, the People's Party sent 58 deputies in the Croatian Parliament out of a total of 106. It went under the name People's Liberal Party (Croatian: Narodna liberalna stranka).

Also in 1861, in the Kingdom of Dalmatia, their sister party in Dalmatia was founded.

Later in the 19th century, the party developed a more Magyar-oriented stance, which eventually caused a faction to form the Independent People's Party (Croatian: Neodvisna narodna stranka) in 1880, led by Matija Mrazović and 22 other parliamentary representatives. The party journal was Obzor, giving rise to their members nickname obzoraši. The People's Party remained in power but enabled a policy of Magyarization, which resulted in major discontent with ban Khuen Hedervary in 1903.

In 1905, the Independent People's Party joined the Croatian-Serbian Coalition (Hrvatsko-srpska koalicija), together with the Party of Rights, as well as the Independents and the Radicals.

The People's Party was technically active until 1918, when Austro-Hungary ceased to exist after World War I.

== Legacy ==
The People's Party was not reformed in the Kingdom of Serbs, Croats and Slovenes. An unrelated people's party, the Pučka stranka, was created in 1919, but it was a right-wing party, with different aims and origins to the original People's Party. It in turn ceased to exist on January 21, 1929.

The Croatian People's Party, founded in 1990, claims lineage from the People's Party.

== Sources ==
- Horvat, Rudolf (1906). Najnovije doba hrvatske povjesti (in Croatian). Matica hrvatska. (Wikisource)
