= Karlovac =

- City
- Grad Karlovac; City of Karlovac
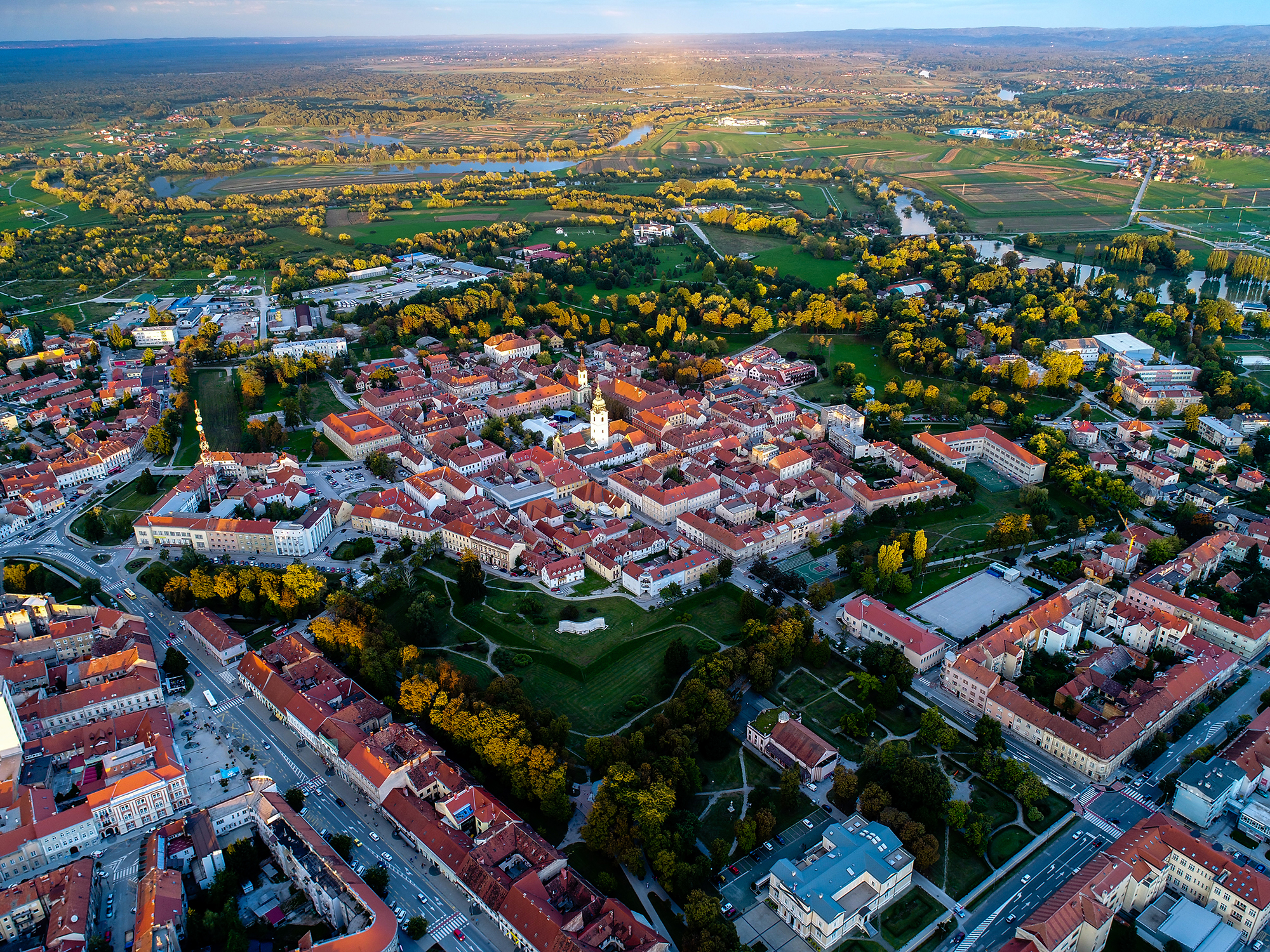
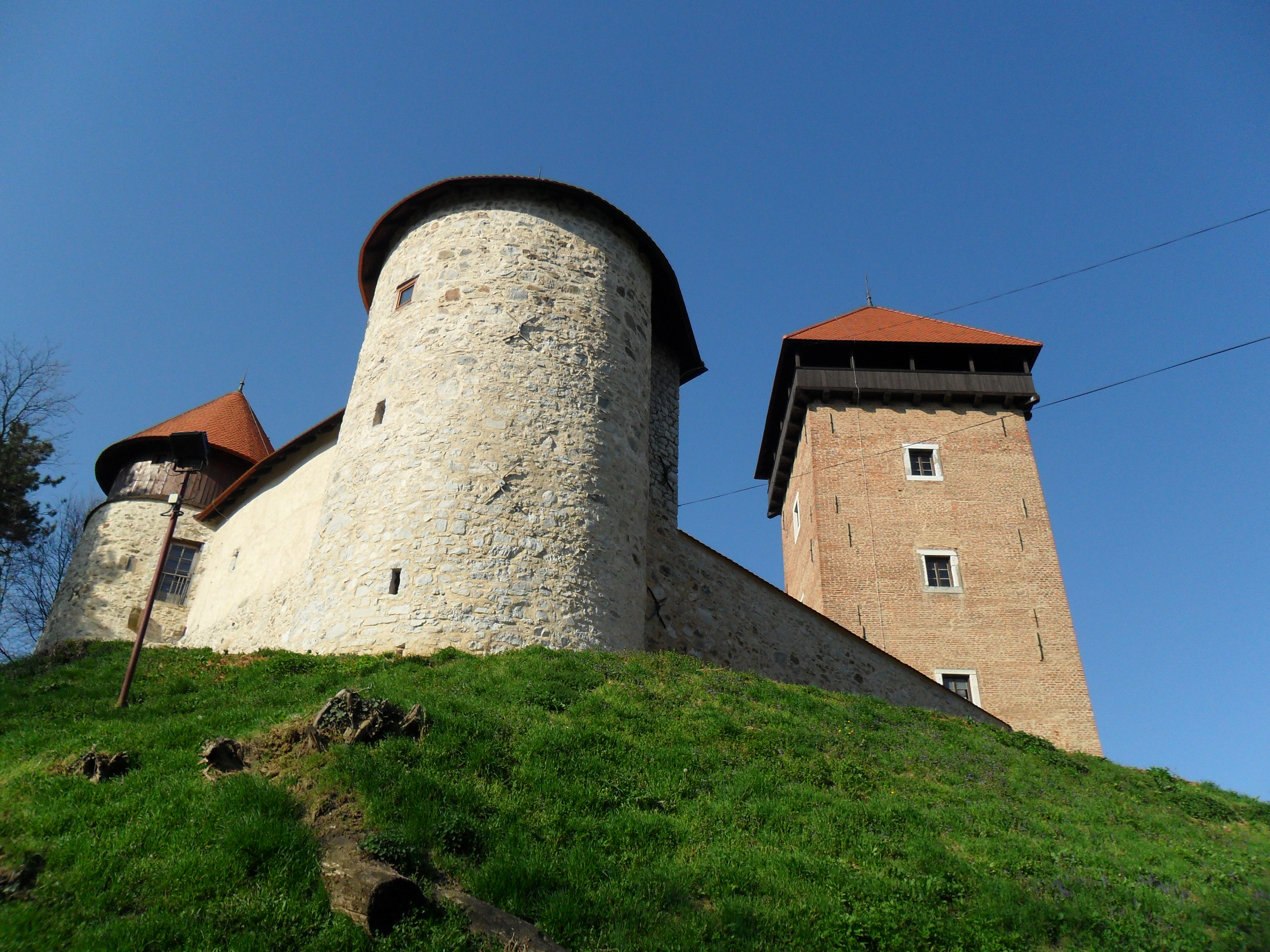
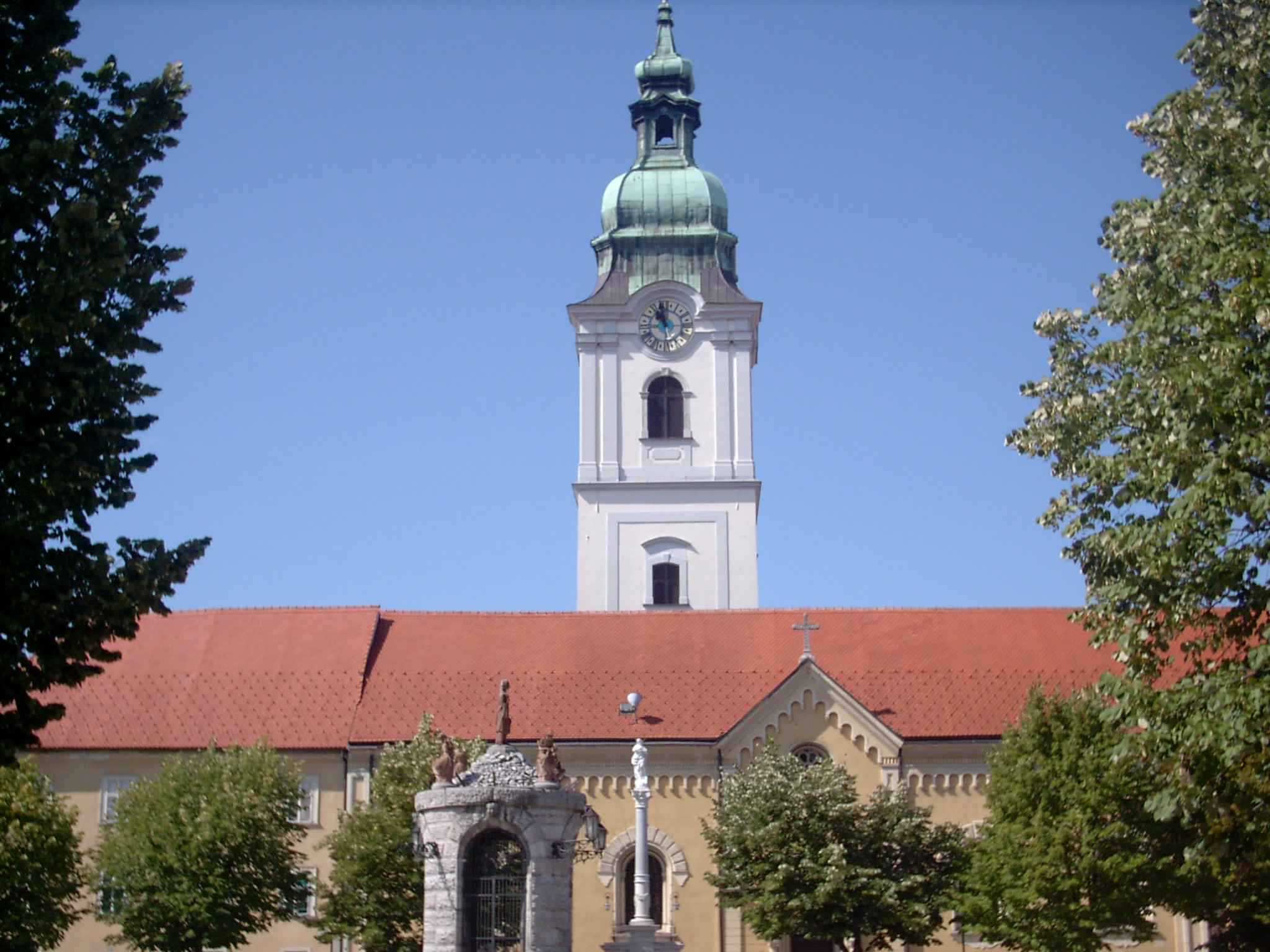
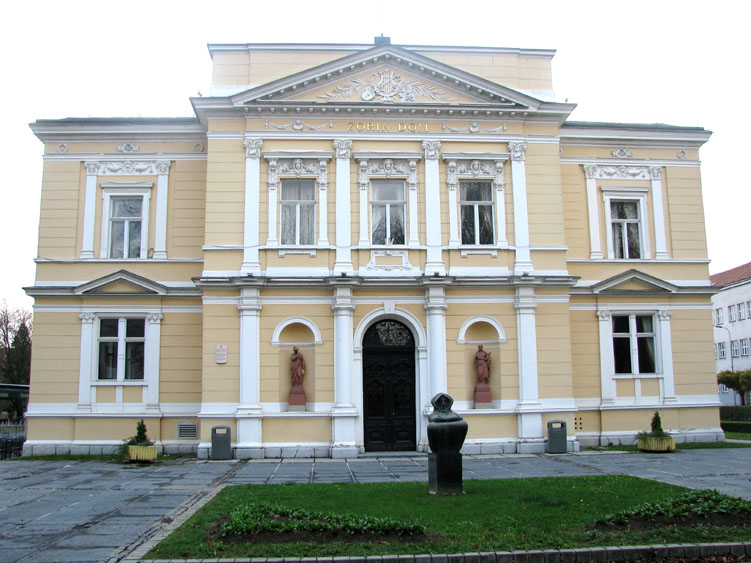
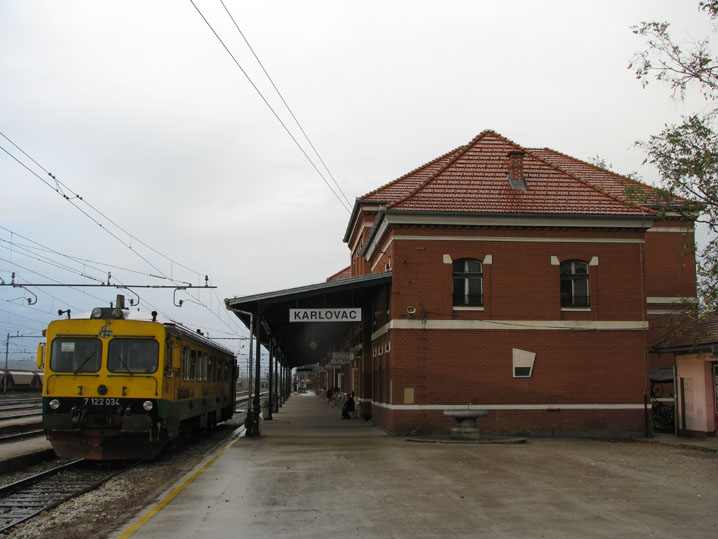
- Top: Aerial view of Karlovac; Center left: Dubovac castle; Center right: Franciscan monastery and Church of Holy Trinity; Bottom left: Zorin dom theatre; Bottom right: Karlovac train station

- Flag Coat of arms
- Interactive map of Karlovac
- Location of Karlovac within Croatia
- Coordinates: 45°29′N 15°33′E
- Country: Croatia
- Region: Central Croatia (Pokuplje)
- County: Karlovac County
- Founded by: Charles II, Archduke of Austria
- Named after: Charles II, Archduke of Austria

Government
  - Mayor: Damir Mandić (HDZ)
  - City Council: 21 members: HDZ, HSLS (9); SDP, HSS, NS-R (5); M!, NL, ORaH (4); DP (2); AUZ, HSU (1)

Area
  - City: 401.1 km^{2} (154.9 sq mi)
  - Urban: 95.3 km^{2} (36.8 sq mi)
- Elevation: 112 m (367 ft)

Population (2021)
  - City: 49,377
  - Density: 123.1/km^{2} (318.8/sq mi)
  - Urban: 41,869
  - Urban density: 439/km^{2} (1,140/sq mi)
- Time zone: UTC+1 (CET)
  - Summer (DST): UTC+2 (CEST)
- Postal code: HR-47 000
- Area code: +385 47
- Vehicle registration: KA
- Website: karlovac.hr

Karlovac (pronounced [kâːrloʋats]) is a city in central Croatia. In the 2021 census, its population was 49,377. Karlovac is the administrative centre of Karlovac County. The city is located 56 kilometres (35 miles) southwest of Zagreb and 130 km (81 mi) northeast of Rijeka, and is connected to them via the A1 highway and the M202 railway.

== Name ==
The city was named after its founder, Charles II, Archduke of Austria. The German name Karlstadt or Carlstadt ("Charlestown") has the equivalence in various languages: in Hungarian it is known as Károlyváros, in Italian as Carlovizza, in Latin as Carolostadium, and in Kajkavian dialect and Slovene as Karlovec.

== History ==
The Austrians built Karlovac from scratch in 1579 in order to strengthen their southern defences against Ottoman encroachments. The establishment of a new city-fortress was a part of the deal between the Protestant nobility of Inner Austria and the archduke Charles II of Austria. In exchange for their religious freedom the nobility agreed to finance the building of a new fortress against the Ottoman Empire. It was founded as a six-pointed star fortress built on the Zrinski estate near the old town of Dubovac at the confluence of the Kupa and Korana rivers. As the city later expanded, the urban area reached as far as the Mrežnica and Dobra rivers. The star shape can still be seen around the town. It was originally known as Karlstadt ("Charles's Town" in German), after the ruling family, upon whose orders construction began on 13 July 1579. The architect of the city was Matija Gambon, whilst work on the new fortress was supervised by George Khevenhüller. It was intentionally built on terrain exposed to flooding and disease from unhealthy water, with the intent to hamper the Turkish advance.

Seal of the free and regal town of Karlovac

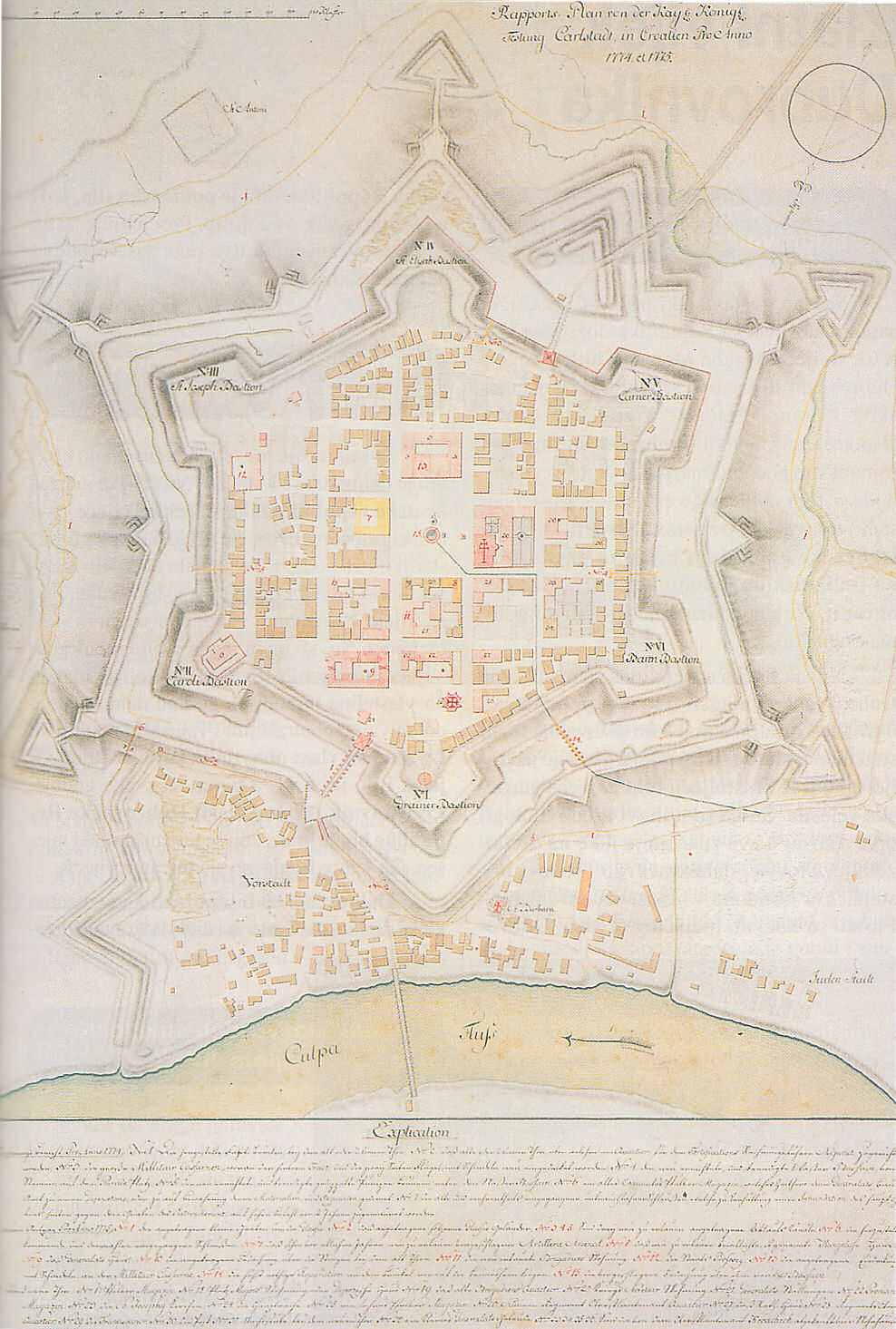
The city of Karlovac emerged around a star-shaped Renaissance fortress built against the Ottomans

The fortress itself was largely complete by September 1580, while moats and ramparts were finished later, between 1582 and 1589. The first church (of the Holy Trinity) was built in the central square in 1580, but all of the city buildings burned down in the fire of 1594. By 1610, moats and ramparts were repaired, and houses were rebuilt.

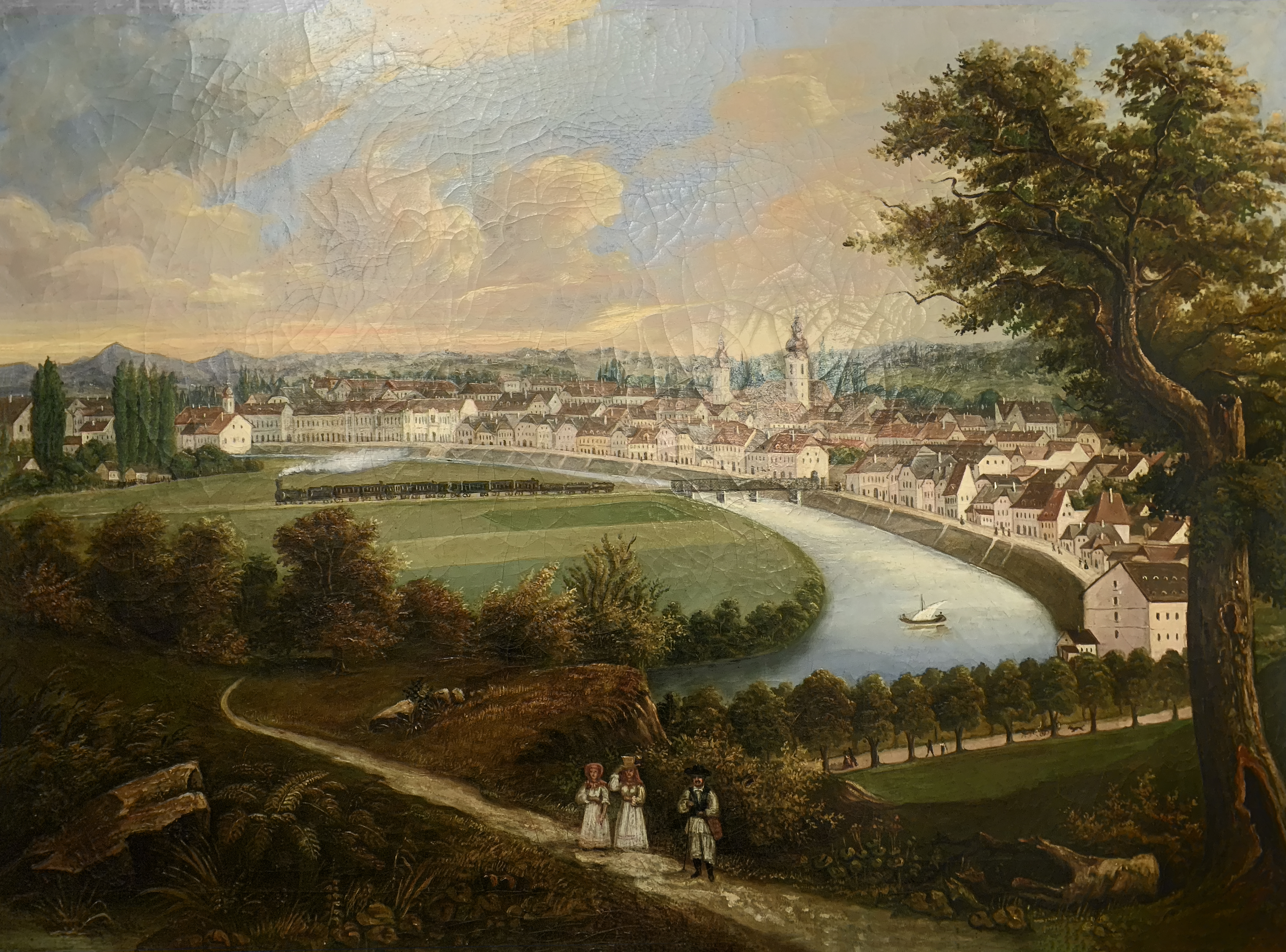
Panorama of Karlovac by train, painting by Jakov Šašel

During the fortification of Karlovac in 1588, its supply chain consisted of Dubovac, Novigrad, Bosiljevo and Ribnik on the one hand, and Ozalj on the other owing the same as the previous four. Each owed 6 carts of timber, and although there were complaints about the conduct of the soldiers stationed in Karlovac, the order was complied with.

As a military outpost of the Habsburg monarchy, Karlovac was one of the first headquarters of the general command of the Military Frontier. It was the site of the trial and execution of the best-known leader of the rebel Uskoks from the coastal fort of Senj, Ivan Vlatković. He was executed in Karlovac on 3 July 1612 as an example to his troops who were creating difficulties for the Habsburgs by their piracy against Venetian shipping on the Adriatic Sea, and by marauding raids into the Ottoman hinterland. In 1615 their piracy went so far as creating an open war between Venice and Austria. When the Treaty of Paris (ratified in Madrid) was concluded in 1617, bringing an end to the war between Venice and the Habsburgs, under the terms of the treaty the Uskok families were forcibly removed from Senj and disbanded into the hinterland, most notably in the Žumberak hills north of Karlovac.

The forces of the Ottoman Empire laid siege to Karlovac seven times, the last time in 1672, but failed to occupy it.

Meanwhile, the fort was becoming too crowded for the city's expanding population and the Military Frontier government could not allow for its further growth. On 6 December 1693 the city received some limited self-government.

After the Treaty of Karlowitz (1699) and the Ottomans withdrawal, Karlstadt was of less military significance. By the end of the 18th century, the town was a major marketplace for wheat, corn, salt, timber and tobacco, and the source of supply for the Austrian army in Austro-Turkish Wars.

Queen Maria Theresa was responsible for the founding of Gymnasium Karlovac in 1766.

The plague epidemic of 1773 also afflicted the city, killing almost half the population of the time.

Queen Maria Theresa, after long insistence from the Croatian Diet, restored the towns of Karlovac and Rijeka (Fiume) to the Croatian crownland on 9 August 1776. King Joseph II, co-regent since 1765, reaffirmed it as a free royal town with an official charter in 1781, after having announced the intent to do that in 1775, and removed it from Military Frontier administration in 1777. This allowed the citizens to expand the city and exploit the potential of being at the crossroads of paths from the Pannonian plains to the Adriatic coast. The town blossomed in the 18th and 19th centuries with the development of roads to the seaside and waterways along the Kupa River. The construction of the Zidani Most-Zagreb-Sisak railway line in 1861, however, marked the end of the era of Karlovac as a major trade and transport center.

=== 19th century ===
The city was once the seat of the kotar court for an 1870 population of 53,148. In 1875, the kotar court of Karlovac was responsible for the općine: Karlovac city, Banija, Rečica, Draganić, Ozalj, Novigrad, Ribnik, Bosiljevo and Severin. The kotar court was subordinate to the royal court at Zagreb.

In the late 19th and early 20th century, Karlovac was a district capital in the Zagreb County of the Kingdom of Croatia-Slavonia within the Austro-Hungarian Empire.

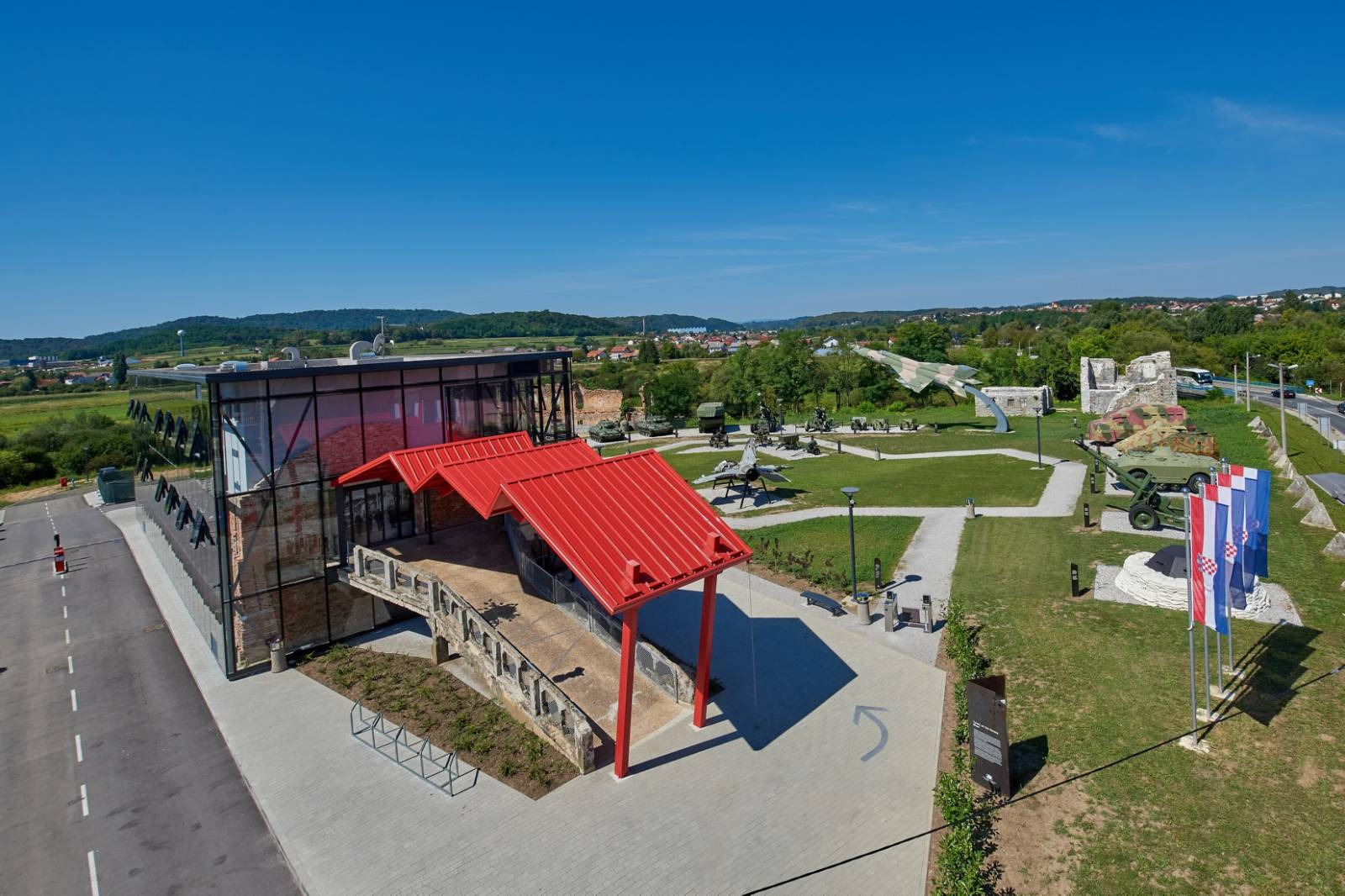
Homeland war Museum -Turanj Autor Denis Stosić

In the late 19th century, a Matica hrvatska branch opened in Karlovac, with 214 members in 1891.

=== 20th century ===
When the German and Italian Zones of Influence were revised on 24 June 1942, Karlovac was the only city within Zone III in which the Italians were allowed to leave troops, and these were alongside Croatian and German troops.

In 1990, City Council proclaimed Saint Joseph as city's patron saint. Karlovac suffered damage during the Croatian War of Independence (1991–1995). The southern sections of the city found themselves close to the front lines between the Republic of Croatia and the Republic of Serbian Krajina, with shelling devastating the neighborhoods of Turanj, Kamensko, as well as parts of Mekušje, Mala Švarča and Logorište. The city center, the city hall, and numerous other buildings also suffered damage. It was also the site of the Korana bridge killings.

The Karlovac City Museum has transformed the old Austrian military barracks of Turanj into a museum exhibition dedicated to the military history of Karlovac and in particular, through the exhibited weapons, of the Croatian War of Independence.

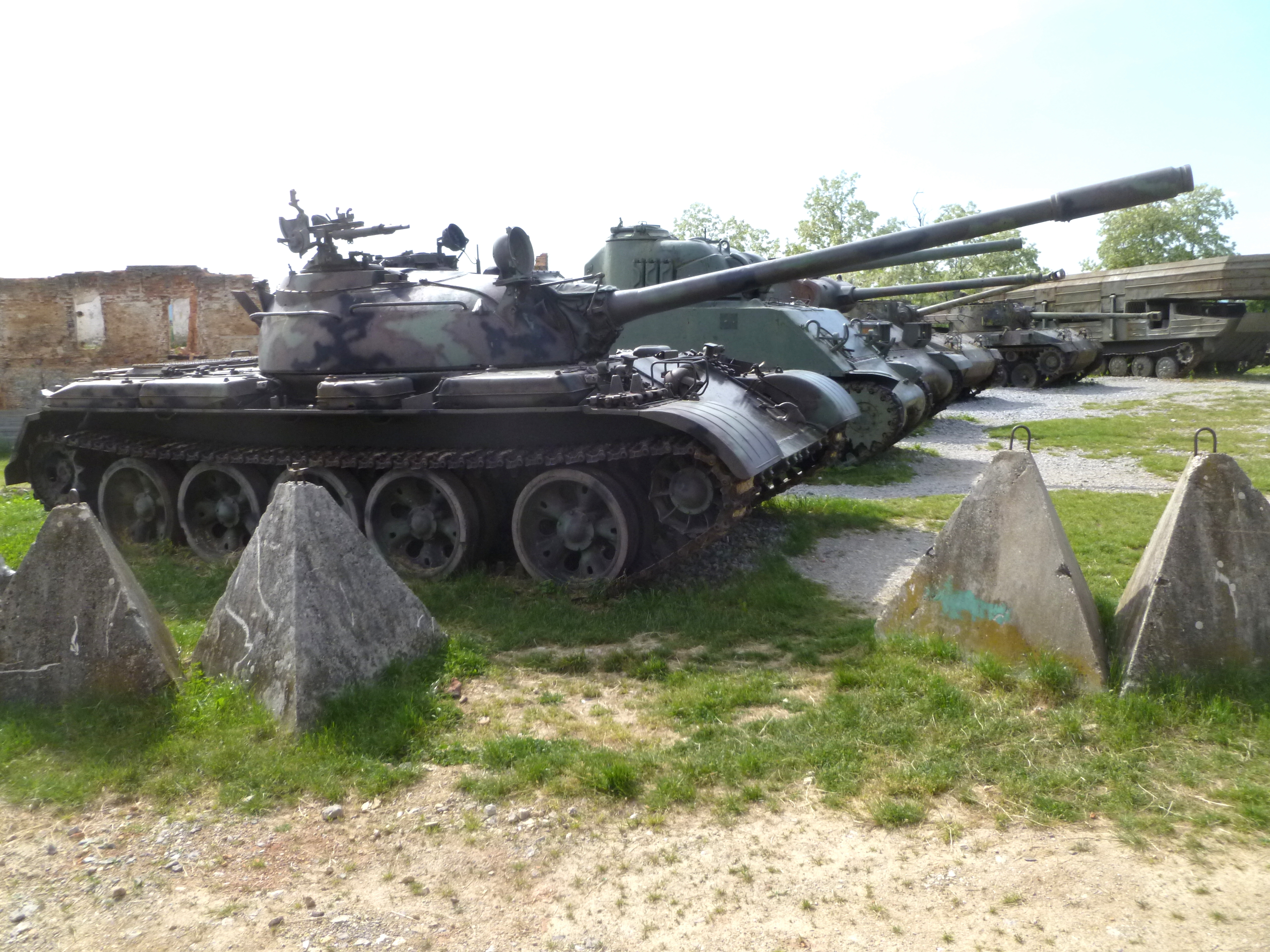
Collection of tanks at the Karlovac museum in Turanj

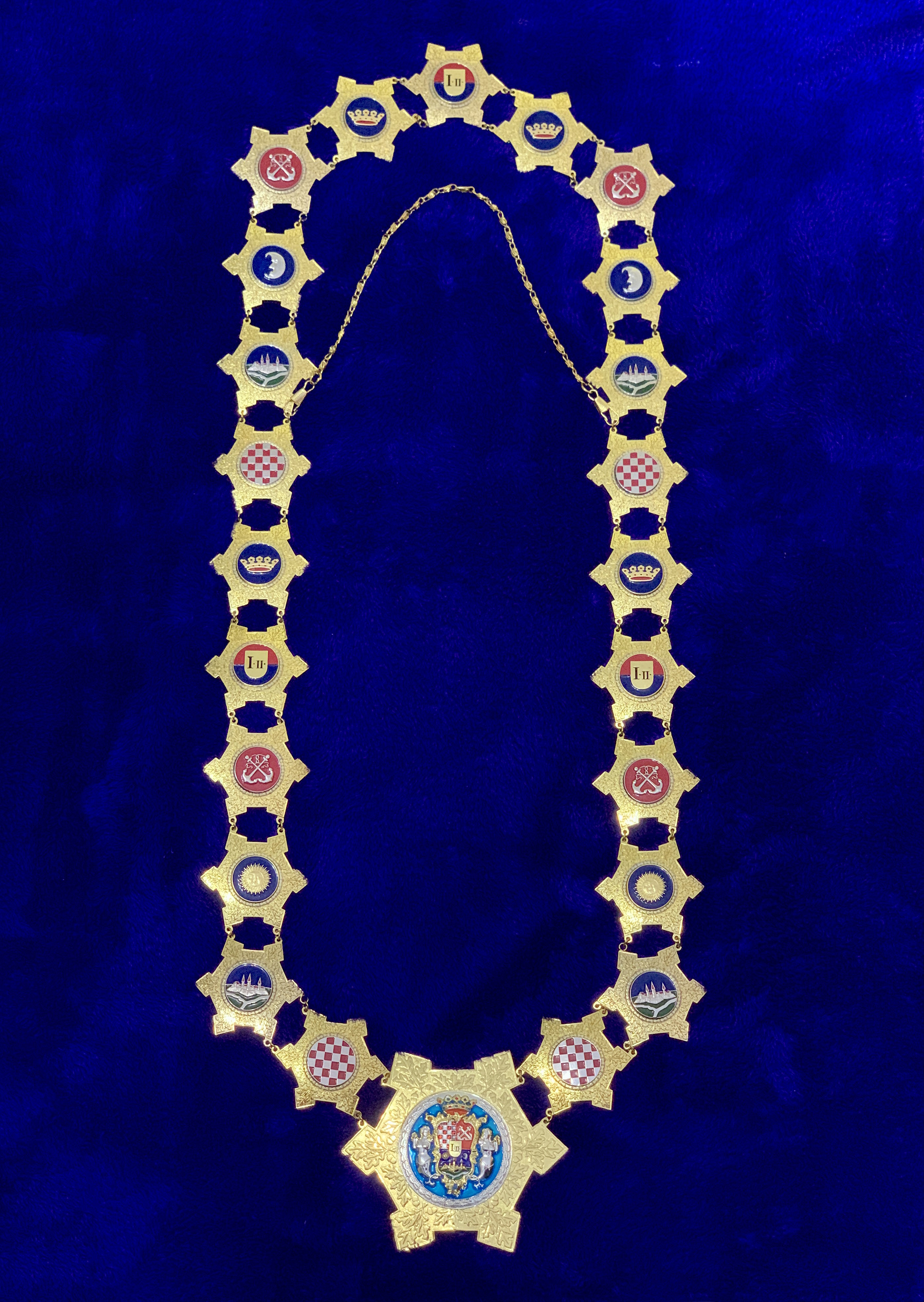
Mayor's chain of honor

Until the early 2000s, Karlovac's main industry consisted of brewing the beer "Karlovačko", produced by Karlovačka pivovara. By 2007, the rapidly growing firearms manufacturer HS Produkt had become the city's largest private employer. HS Produkt is arguably best known as the designer and manufacturer of the HS2000 pistol, sold in the United States as the Springfield Armory XD.

On 22 October 2016 Croatia's first freshwater aquarium, and the biggest in that part of Europe, named Aquatika was opened in Karlovac.

== Description ==
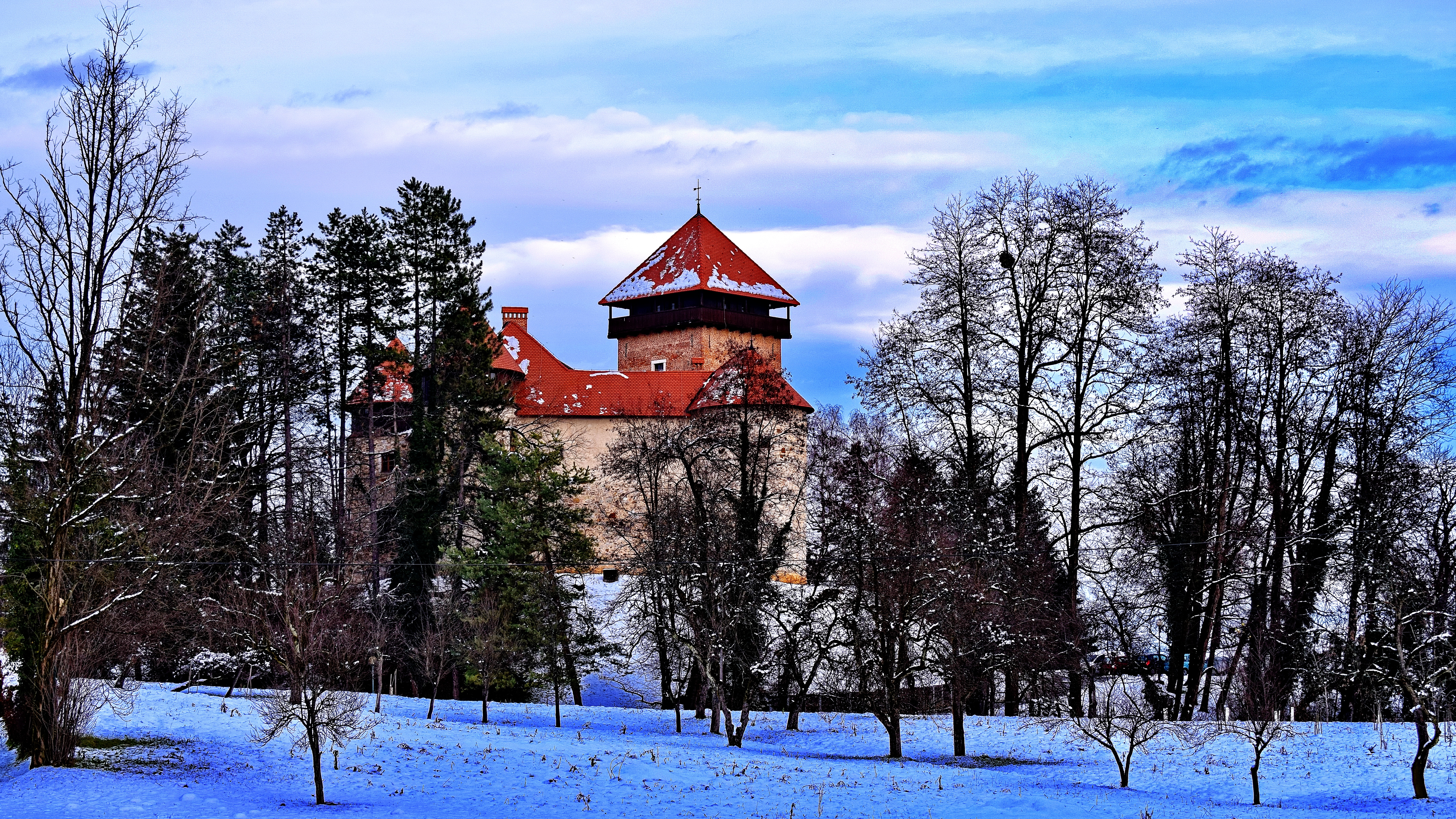
Dubovac Castle

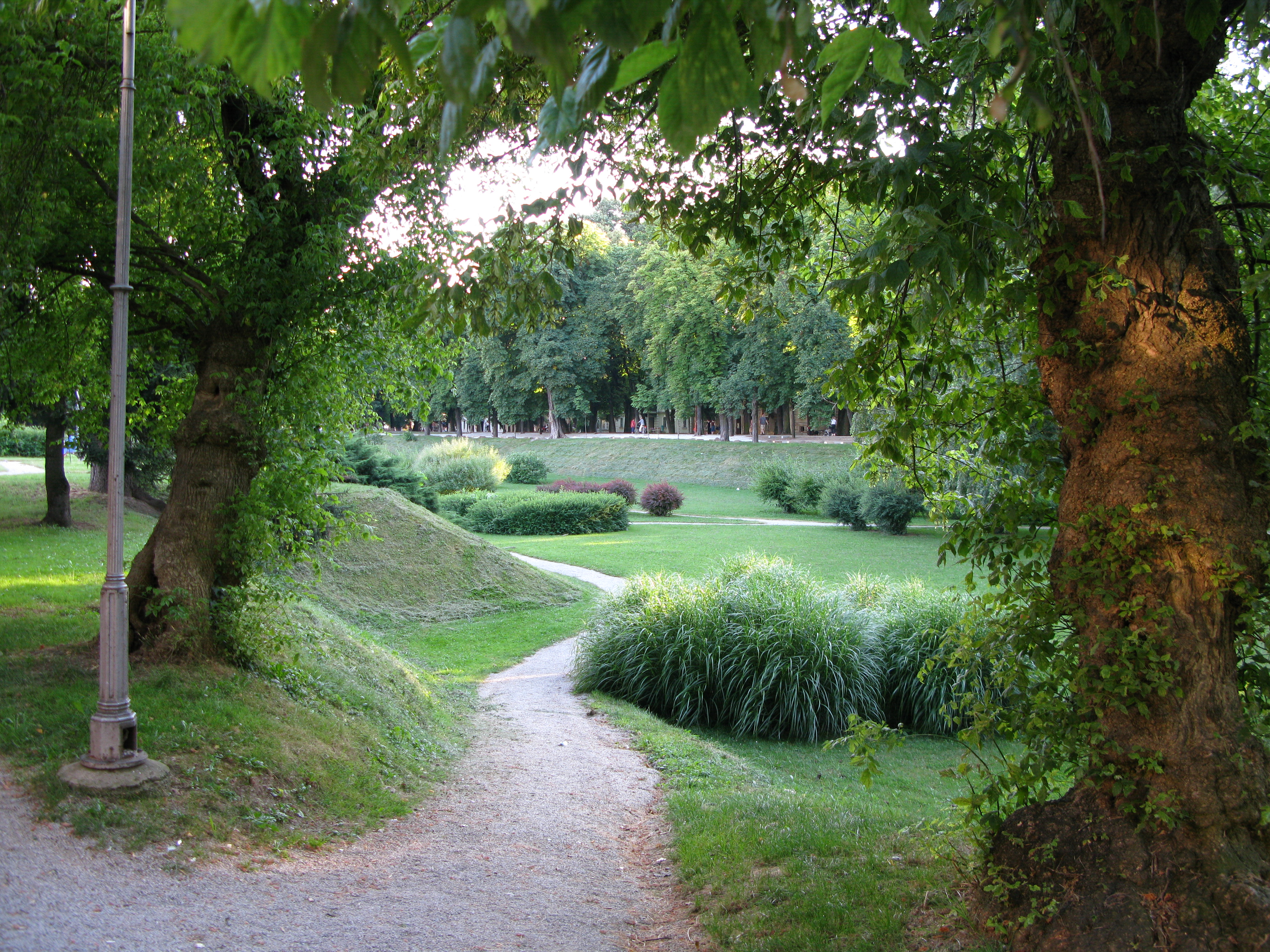
One of the city's parks

Croatians know Karlovac as grad parkova (the city of parks) and grad na četiri rijeke (the town on four rivers) for its numerous green areas and four rivers, of which Mrežnica, Korana, and Kupa flow through built-up areas, and Dobra is a few kilometers outside the city centre. A documentary film made by Dušan Vukotić in 1979 on the occasion of the 400th anniversary of the founding of the city plays much on that theme, and shows pictures of happy bathers on the Korana's Fogina beach (Foginovo kupalište) in the city centre.

One of the rarer trees found in the parks is the Ginkgo biloba, which local primary school children are taken out to see as part of their classes on nature and society. Most of the parks are planted in the former trenches dug around the old military fort that were once filled with water as an added layer of protection from the marauding Ottoman armies. One part of the city centre maintains the name of Šanac ('trench') after the old trenches which preserve the old hexagonal form of the historic centre.

== Climate ==
Since records began in 1949, the highest temperature recorded at the local weather station at an elevation of 110 metres (360 ft) was 42.4 °C (108.3 °F), on 5 July 1950. The coldest temperature was −25.2 °C (−13.4 °F), on 16 February 1956.

== Demographics ==
Historical population
Year	Pop.	±%
1857	24,865	—
1869	26,964	+8.4%
1880	26,947	−0.1%
1890	30,339	+12.6%
1900	32,608	+7.5%
1910	34,713	+6.5%
1921	35,171	+1.3%
1931	41,120	+16.9%
1948	44,974	+9.4%
1953	50,342	+11.9%
1961	58,013	+15.2%
1971	63,887	+10.1%
1981	69,622	+9.0%
1991	73,426	+5.5%
2001	59,395	−19.1%
2011	55,705	−6.2%
2021	49,377	−11.4%
Source: Naselja i stanovništvo Republike Hrvatske 1857–2021, DZS

According to the 2011 census, Karlovac municipality had a total of 55,705 inhabitants. 49,140 of its citizens were Croats (88.21%), 4,460 were Serbs (8.01%), 250 were Bosniaks (0.45%), 237 were Albanians (0.43%), 72 were ethnic Macedonians (0.13%), 49 were Montenegrins (0.09%), and the rest were other ethnicities.

Population by religion in 2011 was following: 45,876 Roman Catholics (82.36%), 3,866 Orthodox Christians (6.94%), 2,806 Atheists (5.04%), 705 Muslims (1.27%), 488 Agnostics (0.88%), and others.

Much of the population of Karlovac has changed since the beginning of the 1991–95 Croatian War of Independence, with numerous families of Croatian Serbs fleeing and being replaced by people who were themselves displaced from parts of Croatia that were held by rebel Serbs during the war (such as from the town of Slunj), as well as by families of Bosnian Croats who started arriving during the war. The migration outflow was mostly towards Serbia, the Republika Srpska entity in Bosnia and Herzegovina, and to countries of Western Europe, North America and Australia.

City of Karlovac: Population trends 1857–2021
v

population	24865	26964	26947	30339	32608	34713	35171	41120	44974	50342	58013	63887	69622	73426	59395	55705	49377
	1857	1869	1880	1890	1900	1910	1921	1931	1948	1953	1961	1971	1981	1991	2001	2011	2021

Sources: Croatian Bureau of Statistics publications

=== Settlements ===
As of 2021, the list of settlements included in the administrative area of the city of Karlovac includes:

- Banska Selnica, population 63 ▼
- Banski Moravci, population 37 ▼
- Blatnica Pokupska, population 32 ▲
- Brezova Glava, population 142 ▲
- Brežani, population 107 ▼
- Brođani, population 38 ▼
- Cerovac Vukmanićki, population 787 ▼
- Donja Trebinja, population 10 ▼
- Donje Mekušje, population 193 ▼
- Donji Sjeničak, population 52 ▼
- Gornja Trebinja, population 145 ▼
- Gornje Stative, population 393 ▼
- Gornji Sjeničak, population 79 ▼
- Goršćaki, population 121 ▼
- Husje, population 153 ▼
- Ivančići Pokupski, population 11
- Ivanković Selo, population 3 ▼
- Ivošević Selo, population 4 ▼
- Kablar, population 82 ▼
- Karasi, population 54 ▲
- Karlovac, population 41869 ▼
- Klipino Brdo, population 6 ▼
- Kljaić Brdo, population 13 ▼
- Knez Gorica, population 106 ▼
- Kobilić Pokupski, population 35 ▼
- Konjkovsko, population 6
- Koritinja, population 82 ▼
- Ladvenjak, population 402 ▲
- Lipje, population 39 ▼
- Luka Pokupska, population 328 ▼
- Mahićno, population 456 ▼
- Manjerovići, population 8 ▼
- Okić, population 43 ▼
- Popović Brdo, population 200 ▼
- Priselci, population 95 ▼
- Rečica, population 489 ▼
- Ribari, population 77 ▼
- Skakavac, population 227 ▼
- Slunjska Selnica, population 65 ▼
- Slunjski Moravci, population 55 ▼
- Šebreki, population 0
- Šišljavić, population 358 ▼
- Tušilović, population 532 ▼
- Tuškani, population 239 ▲
- Udbinja, population 41 ▼
- Utinja, population 2 ▼
- Vodostaj, population 298 ▼
- Vukmanić, population 194 ▼
- Vukoder, population 88 ▼
- Zadobarje, population 315 ▼
- Zagraj, population 59 ▼
- Zamršje, population 144 ▼

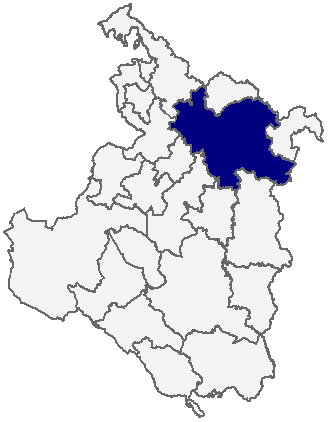
Karlovac municipality within Karlovac County

== Administrative division ==
The administrative sections of Karlovac are the city neighborhoods (gradske četvrti) and local administrative boards (mjesni odbori). The city neighborhoods are:

- Banija
- Drežnik-Hrnetić
- Dubovac
- Gaza
- Grabrik
- Luščić-Jamadol
- Mostanje
- Novi Centar
- Rakovac
- Švarča
- Turanj
- Zvijezda

The local administrative boards are:

- Borlin
- Cerovac Vukmanićki
- Donje Pokupje
- Gornje Mekušje
- Gornje Stative
- Gradac
- Kablar
- Kamensko
- Knez Gorica
- Ladvenjak-Selišće
- Logorište
- Mahično-Tuškani
- Mala Jelsa
- Mala Švarča
- Orlovac
- Pokupska Dolina
- Popović Brdo
- Rečica
- Šišljavić
- Sjeničak-Utinja
- Skakavac
- Tušilović
- Velika Jelsa
- Vukmanić
- Zadobarje
- Zagrad-Kalvarija-Vučjak

== Economy ==
The first savings bank in Karlovac opened in 1872.

== Culture ==
- Karlovac Music School, one of the oldest educational music institutions from this part of Europe (established on 1 December 1804), is the home of Karlovac Piano Festival.
- Karlovac Piano Festival (founded in 2013) is typically held in mid-summer, and consists of master classes with renowned piano pedagogues as well as Karlovac International Piano Competition.
- Music school also hosts International guitar school, while in Karlovac theatre Zorin dom the "Croatia Flute Academy", a Leading Flute Masterclass in Europe has been traditionally held since 2014, so during summer months Karlovac is center of young artists of Europe.
- In the 20th century, Karlovac was a breeding ground for young rock bands, most notably Elektroni in the 1960s and Nužni Izlaz, Prije svega disciplina, Duhovna pastva and Lorelei in the 1970s and the 1980s.
- The city of Karlovac has memorial-sites dedicated to Croatian veterans of the nation's Homeland War and opened the Homeland War Museum in Turanj in 2019.
- American singer Michael Jackson filmed a music video for his song "Earth Song" in Karlovac during Croatian War of Independence, in 1995.

== Sport ==
The local chapter of the HPS is HPD "Martinšćak", which had 99 members in 1936 under the Zlatko Satler presidency. Membership fell to 91 in 1937. Membership rose to 97 in 1938.

- Karlovac 10K, road run
- NK Mostanje, association football club

== Twin towns – sister cities ==
Karlovac is twinned with:

- Alessandria, Italy
- Erzsébetváros (Budapest), Hungary
- Kansas City, United States
- Kragujevac, Serbia
- Vukovar, Croatia

== Gallery ==
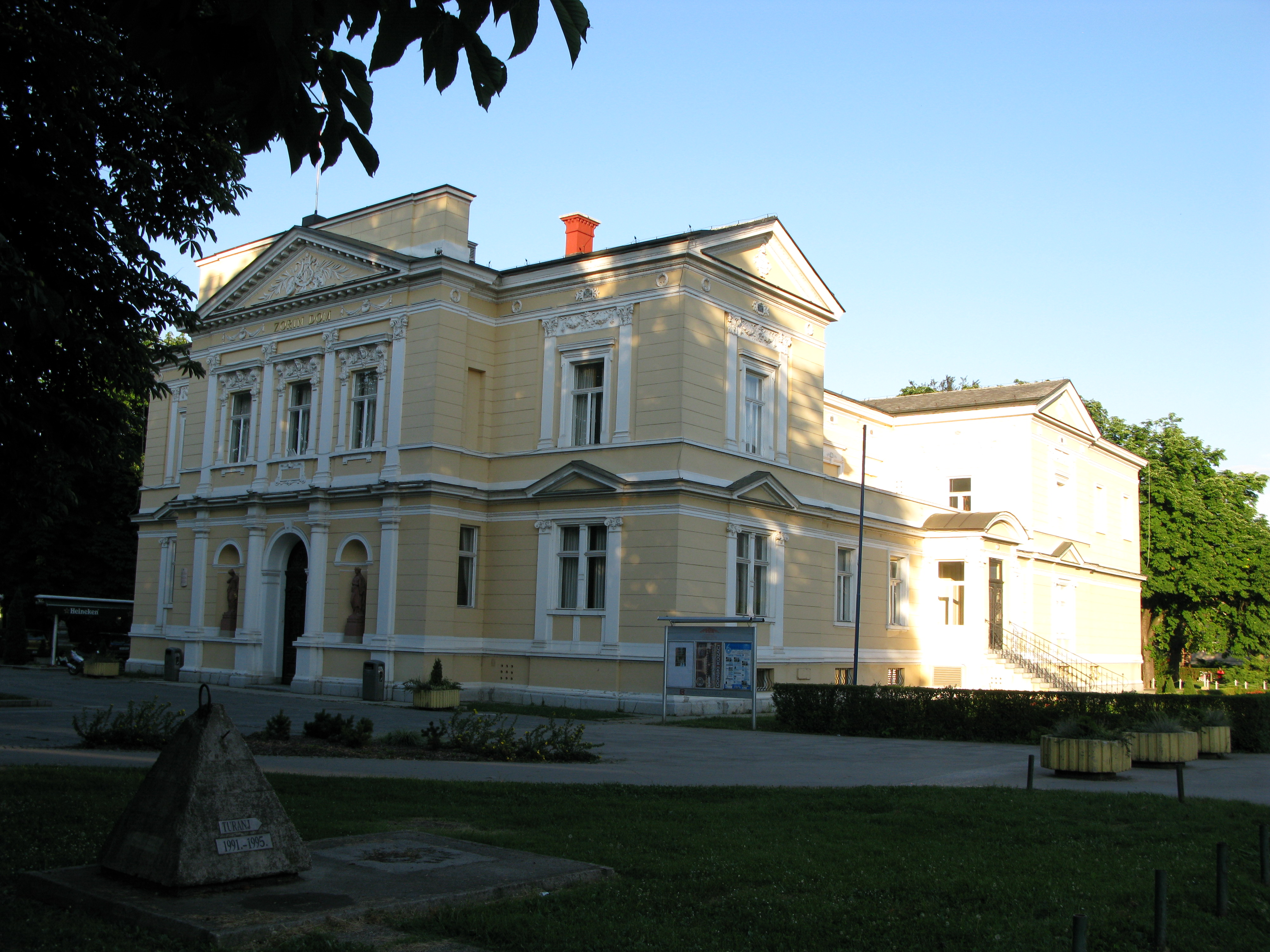
Theatre ("Zorin dom") in Karlovac

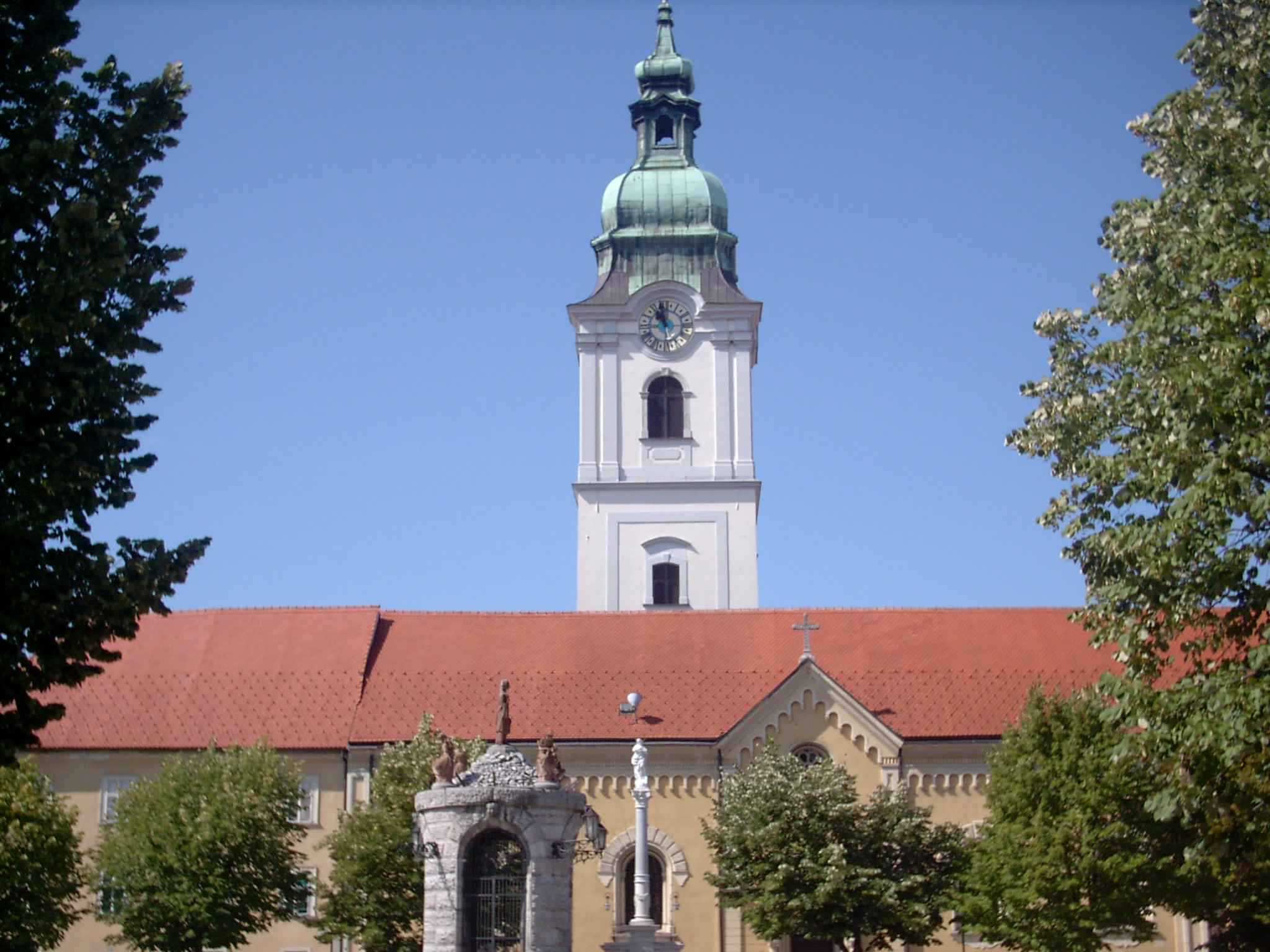
Franciscan Trinity Church (crkva Svetog trojstva) and Monastery, in the centre of Karlovac

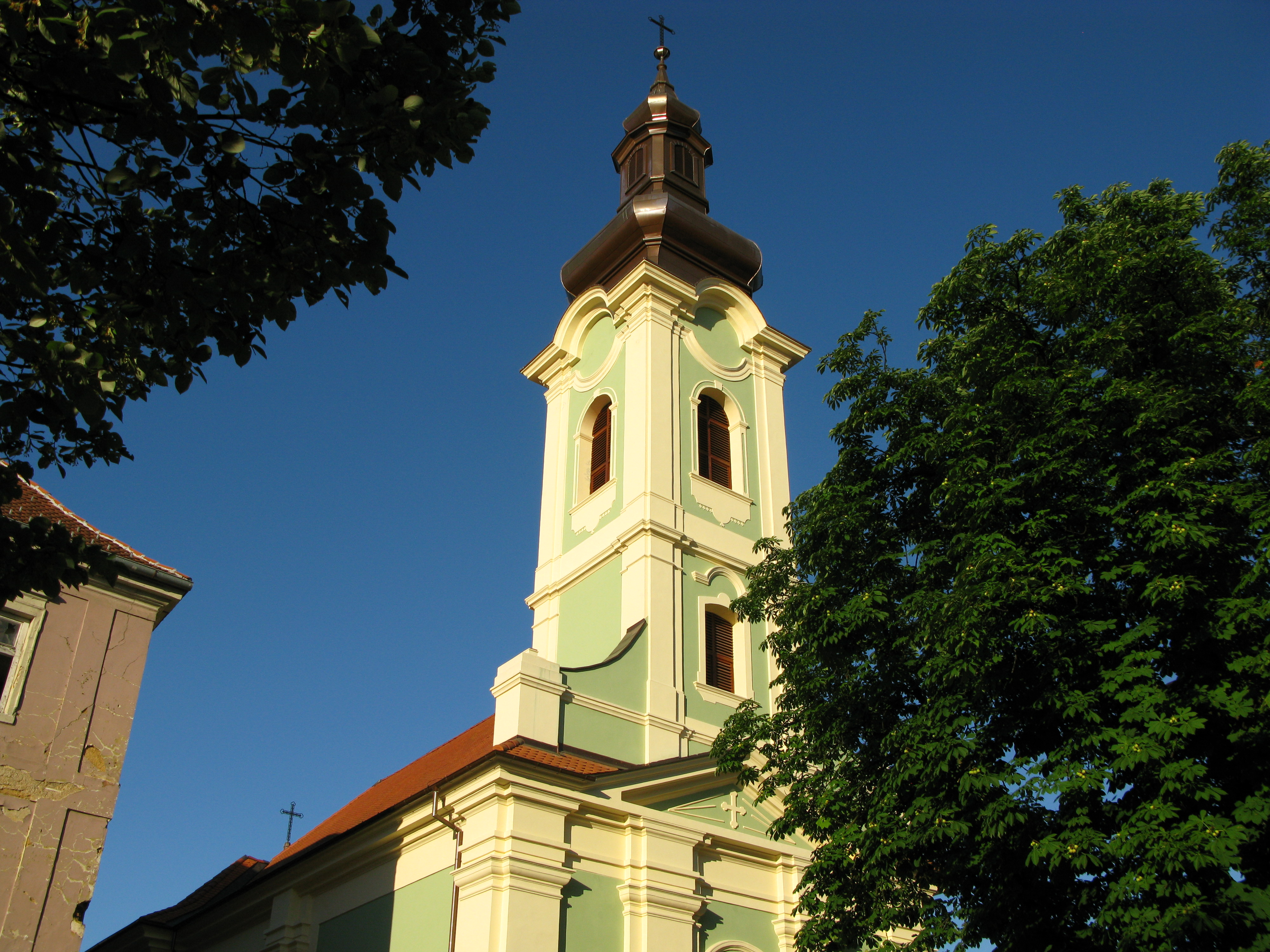
Reconstructed Serbian Orthodox Karlovac Cathedral in the city centre.

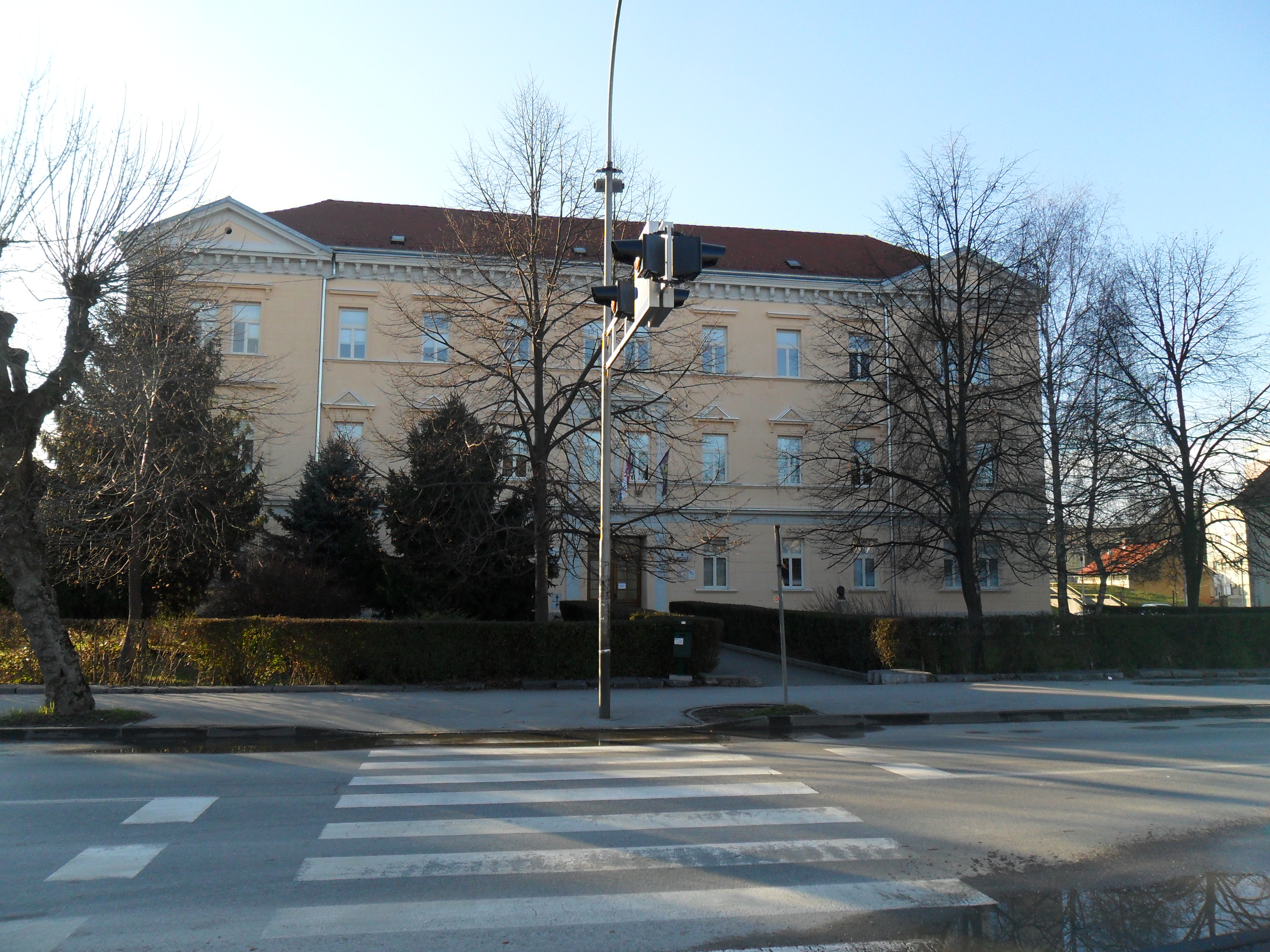
Karlovac Gymnasium

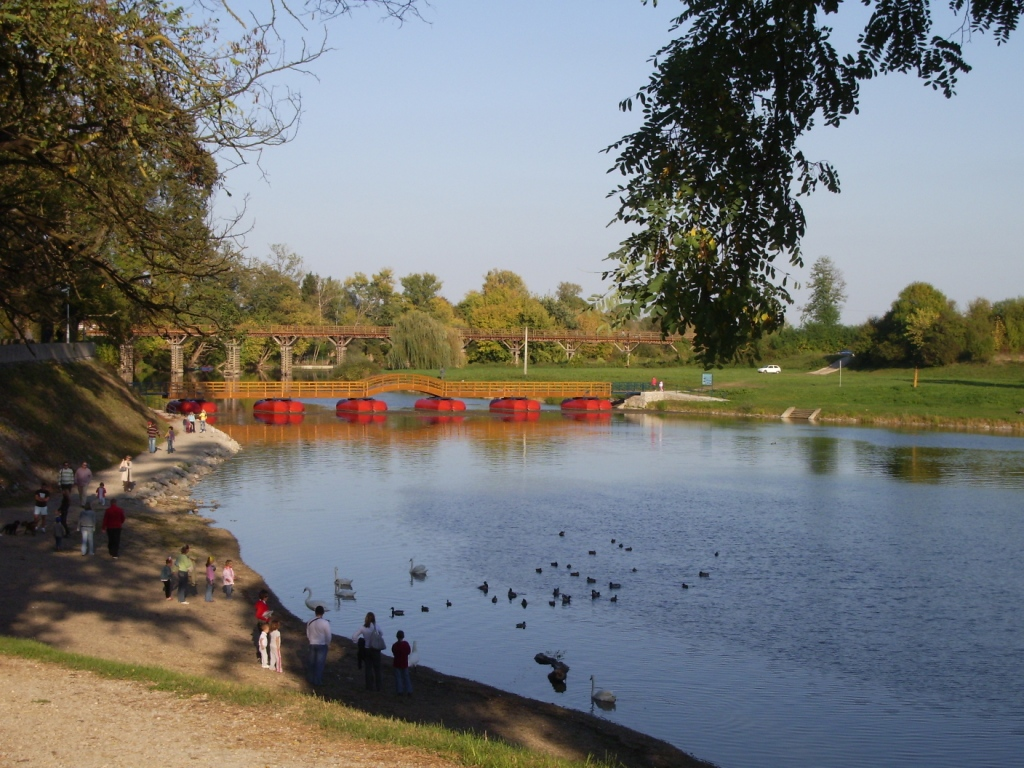
Pontoon bridge on the river Korana

Examples of architecture in Karlovac city centre

Music school Karlovac

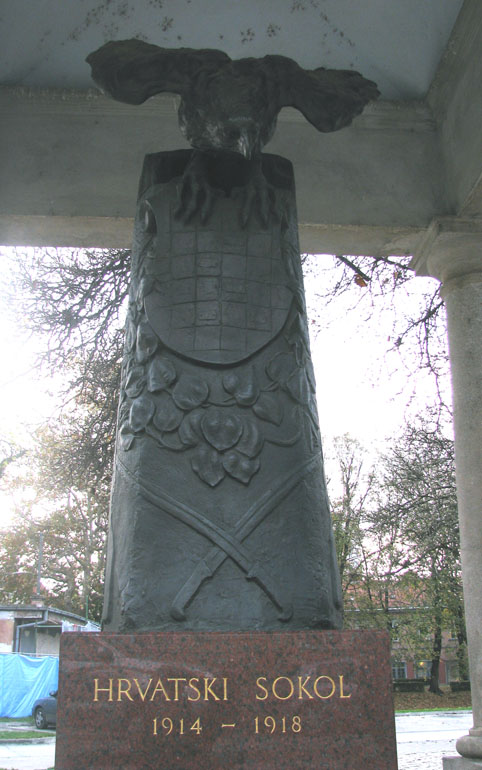
Croatian falcon ("Hrvatski sokol"), monument to the fallen soldiers from Karlovac during World War I

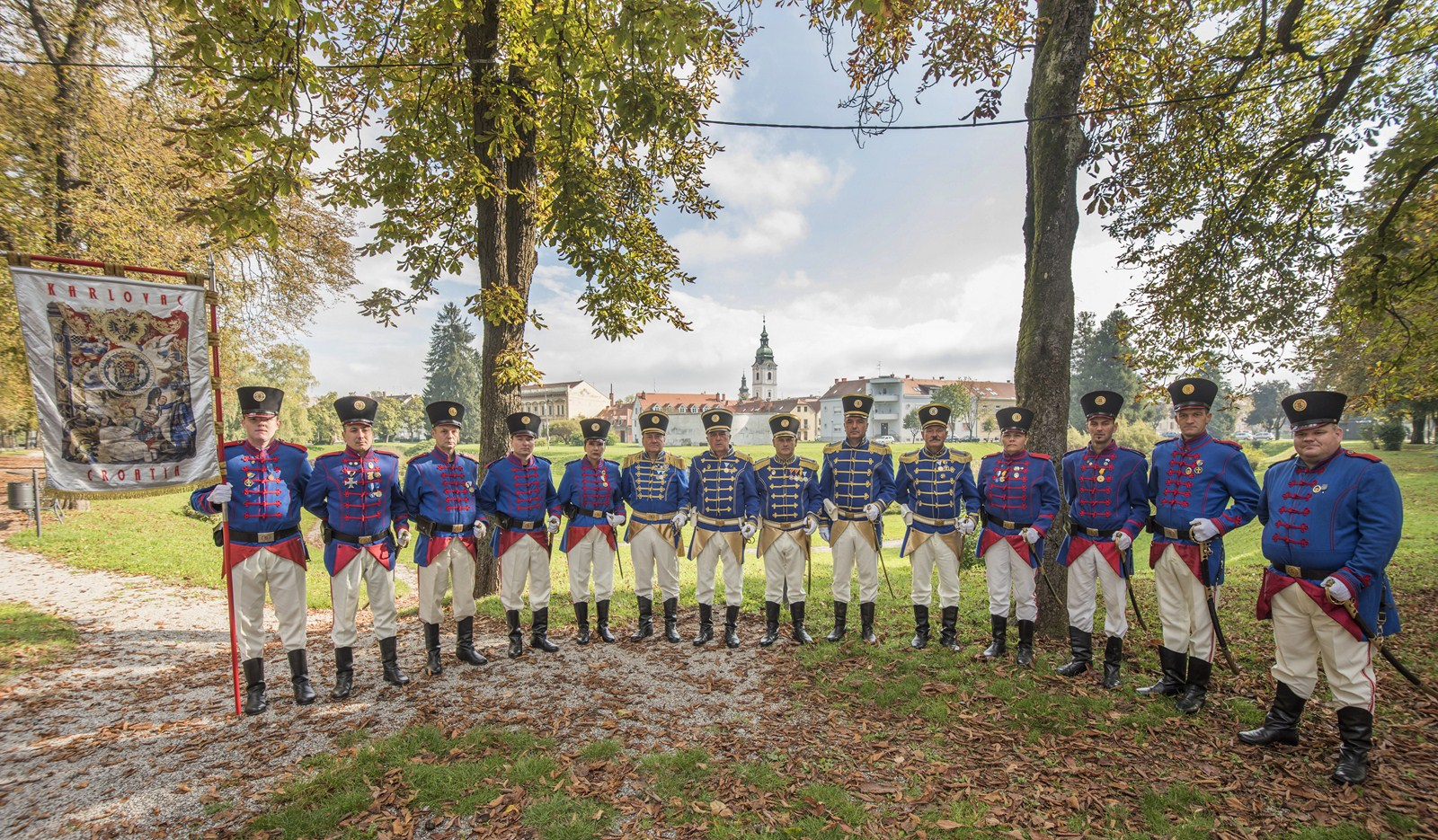
Karlovac Civil Guard- Source: Igor Čepurkovski

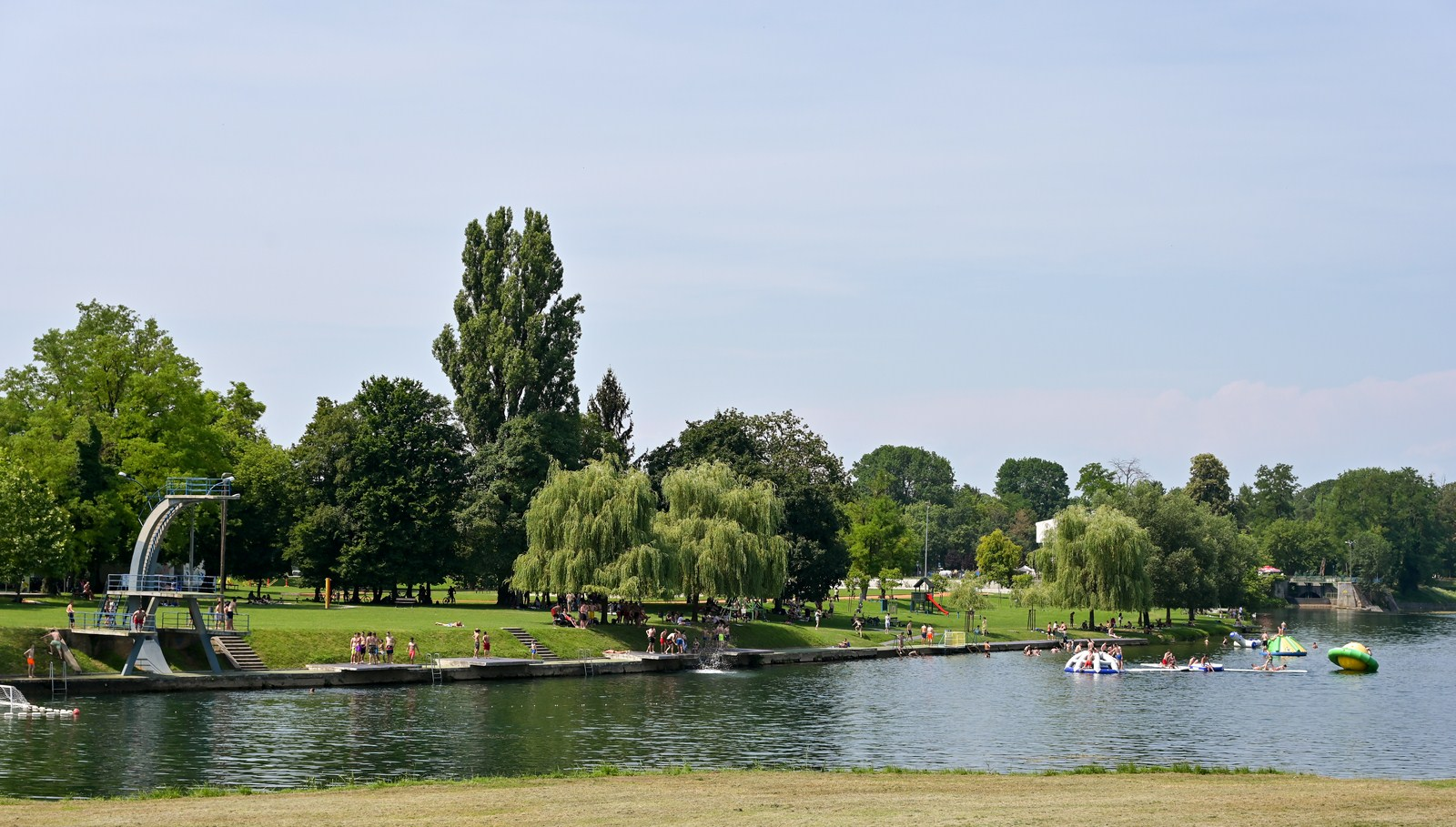
Beach at the Korana river- Source: Igor Čepurkovski

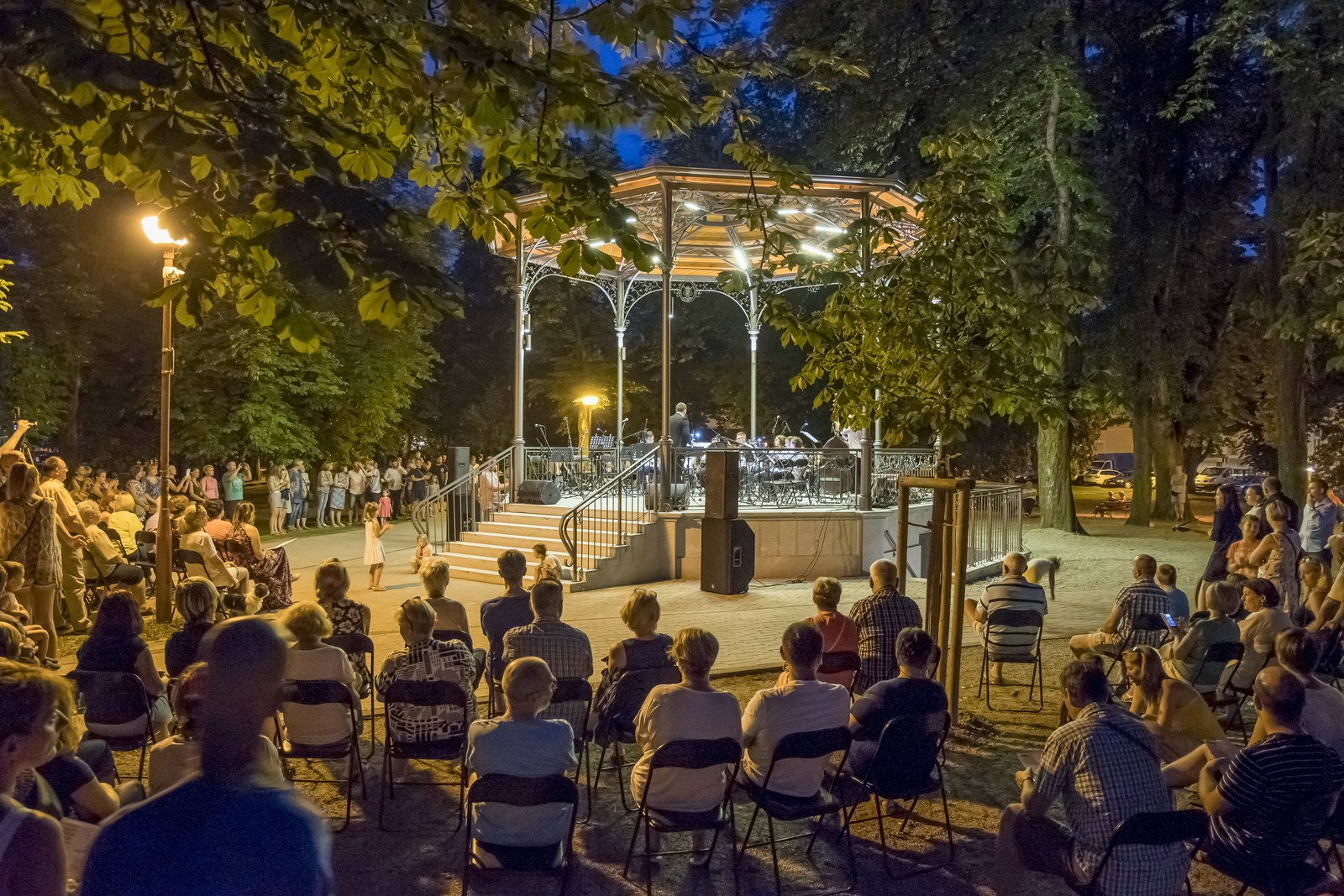
Karlovac promenade - Source: Igor Čepurkovski
