= Karlovac 10K =

- Date: June or July
- Location: Karlovac, Croatia
- Event type: Road
- Distance: 10 km
- Primary sponsor: Karlovačko
- Established: 2013
- Course records: Men's: 28:26 (2023); Vincent Kimutai; Women's: 31:17 (2023); Purity Gitonga
- Website: Official website
- Participants: 732 (2022)

The Karlovac 10K (Croatian: Karlovački cener) is an annual road running event over 10 kilometres (6.2 mi) which takes place in June or July in Karlovac, Croatia. Established in 2013, the race goes through the roads of Karlovac historic centre, near Kupa and Korana rivers and finishes in the same place it started. The race consists of four laps, and time limit is 1 hour and 30 minutes. It's the one and only Croatian race with World Athletics Bronze Label status. The race often has a title sponsorship, and is currently branded as the "Heineken 0.0 Karlovac 10K". In 2020, about 600 Runners took part in the race.

== Elite race winners ==
Key: Course record

Edition	Year	Men's winner	Time (h:m:s)	Women's winner	Time (h:m:s)
1st	2013	Goran Grdenić (CRO)	31:55	Lisa Christina Stublić (CRO)	33:20
2nd	2014	Goran Grdenić (CRO)	31:41	Lisa Christina Nemec (CRO)	34:22
3rd	2015	Nikola Mikulić (CRO)	32:27	Lisa Christina Nemec (CRO)	36:07
4th	2016	Hillary Kiptum Maiyo Kimaiyo (KEN)	29:39	Christine Moraa Oigo (KEN)	33:33
5th	2017	Abel Kibet Rop (KEN)	30:03	Stella Barsosio (KEN)	34:02
6th	2018	Abel Kibet Rop (KEN)	29:40	Zita Kácser (HUN)	34:08
7th	2019	Moses Kurong (UGA)	28:30	Caroline Chebet (KEN)	32:53
8th	2020	Sebastian Hendel (GER)	30:13	Matea Parlov Koštro (CRO)	33:57
9th	2021	Dieudonné Nsengiyuma (BDI)	29:09	Likina Amebaw (ETH)	33:07
10th	2022	Hicham Sigueni (MAR)	29:06	Winfridah Moseti (KEN)	31:32
11th	2023	Vincent Kimutai (KEN)	28:26	Purity Gitonga (KEN)	31:17
12th	2024	Joseph Kimutai (KEN)	28:27	Caroline Gitonga (KEN)	32:06
