= Grga Tuškan =

Croatian politician and lawyer (1862–1923)

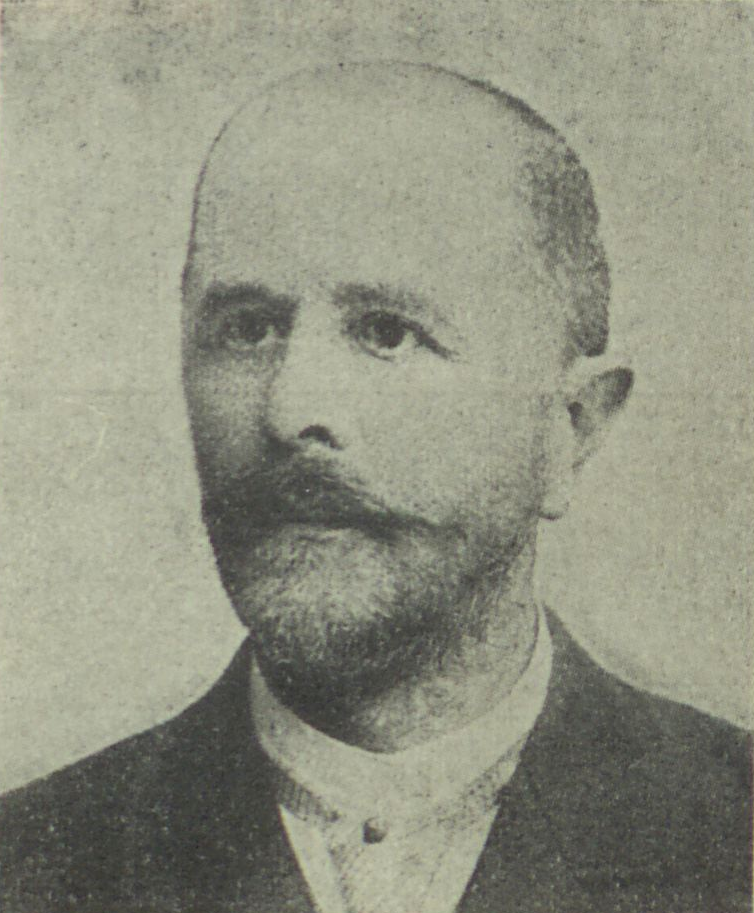
- Born: 5 July 1845; Ladvenjak, Croatia, Austrian Empire (now Croatia)
- Died: 22 February 1923 (aged 77); Sisak, Kingdom of Serbs, Croats and Slovenes
- Education: University of Zagreb; University of Graz
- Occupations: Politician and lawyer
- Political party: Party of Rights; Croat-Serb Coalition; Democratic Party

Grga Tuškan (5 July 1845 – 22 February 1923) was a Croatian politician and lawyer. He was elected to the Sabor of Croatia-Slavonia for the first time in 1883 as a member of the Party of Rights. Refusing to testify in favour of the Ban of Croatia regarding the 1885 assault against Károly Khuen-Héderváry in the Sabor, Tuškan was imprisoned and lost the right to practise law. Subsequently, he opened a café in Sisak instead. By the time of fragmentation of the party in 1895, Tuškan rose to leading positions in the party, ultimately replacing Fran Folnegović as the president of the Party of Rights. Subsequently, Tuškan led the Party of Rights through a merger with the Independent People's Party and into the Croat-Serb Coalition.

== Early life ==
Grga Tuškan was born in Ladvenjak near Karlovac to a peasant family on 5 July 1845. He studied law at the University of Zagreb and earned a doctoral degree in law from the University of Graz. In 1873 he was briefly employed by the court in Zagreb before working in the law firm of Lavoslav Šram. Ban of Croatia Ivan Mažuranić offered Tuškan a government job, but he declined preferring independence. In 1877, Tuškan opened law practice in the city of Sisak. He joined the Party of Rights and unsuccessfully ran on the party ticket in the 1881 election.

== Takeover of the Party of Rights ==
Tuškan first won a seat in the Croatian Sabor for the Party of Rights in the 1883 Croatian parliamentary by-election. In 1885, after he declined to testify in favour of the Ban of Croatia Károly Khuen-Héderváry in relation to an assault against the ban in the Sabor, Tuškan was convicted and sentenced to imprisonment, loss of his doctoral degree and the right to practise law. After release, he opened a café in Sisak. In the 1895 split of the Party of Rights, Tuškan supported the Domovinaši faction led by Fran Folnegović. That year, he was elected to the Central Committee of the Party of Rights as one of five representatives of the party organisation in the Kingdom of Croatia-Slavonia and the vice-president of the parliamentary club of the Party of Rights. In the aftermath of the party split, Folnegović resigned from the helm of the party and Tuškan took over as the party president. In the ensuing conflict with the opposing faction, the Pure Party of Rights and its leader Josip Frank, Tuškan and the Party of Rights resorted to antisemitic attacks against Frank, a convert from Judaism.

== Final years ==
In 1897, the Party of Rights and the Independent People's Party formed the United Opposition coalition ahead of the 1897 Croatian parliamentary election. In 1902, the two fused into the party named the United Opposition. The next year, the United Opposition was renamed the Croatian Party of Rights, with Tuškan as the president. According to contemporary politician Frano Supilo, Tuškan's support for his New Course Policy helped push the Croatian Party of Rights to accept the political strategy of establishing an alliance with the Hungarian opposition with the aim of improving position of Croatia within Austria-Hungary. Implementation of the policy led to cooperation with Croatian Serb political parties. Under Tuškan's leadership, the party joined the Croat-Serb Coalition established on the platform of the New Course Policy. In 1906, Tuškan also became the president of the Croat-Serb Coalition. Following the 1918 creation of Yugoslavia, Tuškan joined the Democratic Party. He died in Sisak on 22 February 1923.

== Sources ==
- "Tuškan, Grga". Hrvatska enciklopedija (in Croatian). Miroslav Krleža Institute of Lexicography.
- Goldstein, Ivo (1996). "Stjepan Radić i Židovi" [Stjepan Radić and the Jews]. Radovi Zavoda za hrvatsku povijest Filozofskoga fakulteta Sveučilišta u Zagrebu: Radovi Zavoda za hrvatsku povijest Filozofskoga fakulteta Sveučilišta u Zagrebu (in Croatian). 29 (1). Zagreb: University of Zagreb: 208–216. ISSN 0353-295X.
- Gross, Mirjana (1998). "Folnegović, Fran". Croatian Biographical Lexicon (in Croatian). Miroslav Krleža Institute of Lexicography.
- Miller, Nicholas J. (2010). Between Nation and State: Serbian Politics in Croatia Before the First World War. University of Pittsburgh Press. ISBN 978-0-8229-7722-3.
- Šetić, Nevio (2014). "Odnos istarskih pravaša prema raskolu u Stranci prava Banske Hrvatske 1895" [Relation of the Istrian Members of the Party of Rights Toward the Disunion in the Party of Rights in Ban's Croatia of 1895]. Tabula: časopis Filozofskog fakulteta, Sveučilište Jurja Dobrile u Puli (in Croatian) (12). Pula: Juraj Dobrila University of Pula: 233–244. doi:10.32728/tab.12.2014.20. ISSN 1331-7830.
- Turkalj, Jasna (2004). "Stranka prava i izbori za Hrvatski sabor na području bivše Vojne krajine 1883. godine" [The Party of Right and the Elections for the Croatian Diet in the Newly Joined Military Border Territory in 1883]. Časopis za suvremenu povijest (in Croatian). 36 (3). Zagreb: Croatian Institute of History: 1013–1037. ISSN 0590-9597.
- Veselinović, Velimir (2018). "Pregled razvoja pravaške ideologije i politike" [An Overview of the Development of Rightist Ideology and Politics]. Časopis za suvremenu povijest (in Croatian). 50 (3). Zagreb: Croatian Institute of History: 583–620. ISSN 0590-9597.
