= Korana bridge killings =

Massacre of the Croatian War of Independence

- Part of the Croatian War of Independence and the Yugoslav Wars
- Karlovac on the map of Croatia; JNA/SAO Krajina-held areas in late 1991 are highlighted in red
- Location: Korana bridge, Karlovac, Croatia
- Date: 21 September 1991
- Target: Yugoslav People's Army reservists
- Attack type: Mass shooting, summary executions
- Deaths: 13
- Injuries: 2
- Convicted: Mihajlo Hrastov (4 years' imprisonment)

Thirteen Yugoslav People's Army prisoners of war were extrajudicially killed at the Korana bridge in Karlovac, Croatia on 21 September 1991, during the Croatian War of Independence. Four others survived the massacre, two of whom sustained injuries.

Croatian Police officer Mihajlo Hrastov was arrested by the Croatian authorities in March 1992 and charged with the murders, but was acquitted at his subsequent trial. The Supreme Court of Croatia soon ordered a retrial, but no legal proceedings were initiated against him for the duration of the war. On 7 July 1995, Hrastov was awarded the Order of Nikola Šubić Zrinski by Croatian president Franjo Tuđman, and in April 1996, was named an honorary citizen of Karlovac. During the 2000s and early 2010s, Hrastov was retried multiple times by the Croatian judiciary before finally being sentenced to four years' imprisonment by the Supreme Court in 2012. In May 2015, the Supreme Court upheld Hrastov's four-year sentence. The length of Hrastov's sentence was criticized by several human rights advocates and non-governmental organizations. Also criticized was the Supreme Court's decision not to explicitly describe the killings as a war crime in its ruling or take into account witness testimony which suggested Hrastov was not the sole perpetrator.

Events commemorating the victims have caused substantial controversy within Karlovac and have been disrupted multiple times by Croatian war veterans. At a war veterans' event in 2021, Croatian president Zoran Milanović made comments that were widely perceived as being supportive of Hrastov. Later that year, on the thirtieth anniversary of the massacre, the Karlovac town council voted to name the bridge where the killings took place after Hrastov's special police unit. At a ceremony held later that day, a mural of Hrastov was unveiled next to the bridge.

== Background ==
In 1988-89, a series of street protests dubbed anti-bureaucratic revolutions by supporters of Serbian leader Slobodan Milošević succeeded in overthrowing the government of the Socialist Republic of Montenegro, as well as the governments of the Serbian autonomous provinces of Vojvodina and Kosovo, replacing their leaders with Milošević allies. As a result, the western Yugoslav republics of Slovenia and Croatia turned against Milošević. On 8 July 1989, a large Serb nationalist rally was held in Knin, during which banners threatening a Yugoslav People's Army (Serbo-Croatian: Jugoslovenska narodna armija; JNA) intervention in Croatia, as well as Chetnik iconography, were displayed.

In April–May 1990, Franjo Tuđman's right-wing, pro-independence Croatian Democratic Party (Croatian: Hrvatska demokratska zajednica; HDZ) triumphed in Croatia's first free multi-party elections. The HDZ's election victory caused consternation amongst much of the Croatian Serb population, who likened the resurgence of Croatian nationalism to the return of the fascist Ustaše regime which ruled the Axis puppet state known as the Independent State of Croatia during World War II. This, in turn, fed a rise in Serbian nationalism in many Croatian Serb communities, which was encouraged by the government of the Socialist Republic of Serbia, led by Milošević. On 21 December 1990, representatives of the Serb Democratic Party in Croatia proclaimed the establishment of three "Serbian Autonomous Oblasts": SAO Krajina, SAO Western Slavonia and SAO Eastern Slavonia, Baranja and Western Syrmia.

On 19 May 1991, Croatia held a referendum on whether to secede from Yugoslavia. Largely boycotted by the Serb minority, the referendum passed with 94 percent voting in favour. On 25 June, Slovenia and Croatia unilaterally declared independence, a move that prompted a brief and ill-fated military intervention by the JNA in Slovenia which came to be known as the Ten-Day War. As part of the Brioni Agreement of 18 July, representatives of Slovenia and Croatia agreed to delay their countries' formal independence by three months. On 14 September, the Croatian leadership decided to begin blockading JNA barracks on the territory of Croatia. On 8 October, Slovene and Croatian officials announced they would fully implement their independence declarations. Open conflict soon erupted across much of central and eastern Croatia between Croatian military and paramilitary units and the JNA, whose status on the territory of Croatia was left ambiguous under the terms of the Brioni Agreement. This escalation was accompanied by the expulsion of Croats and other non-Serbs from areas where Serb paramilitaries established military control. Meanwhile, Serbs living in Croatian towns, especially near the front lines, were subjected to various forms of harassment and attacks.

Prior to the war, Karlovac was a prosperous Baroque town known for its beer production. By 1991, the municipality of Karlovac was home to approximately 22,000 ethnic Serbs. The town itself had around 14,500 Serb inhabitants, who accounted for 24.2 percent of its overall population. It figured prominently in the ideology of Serbian Radical Party leader Vojislav Šešelj, who envisaged creating a Greater Serbia along the Virovitica–Karlovac–Karlobag line. The JNA had at least ten barracks, depots and other facilities in and around Karlovac, including an artillery brigade garrison, a light air defense regiment, a T-34 storage facility and engineer training facilities. By 18 September, the JNA had secured Petrinja, crossed the left bank of the Kupa River and reached the outskirts of Karlovac. The loss of Karlovac, which lay not far from the Slovenian border, would have effectively severed Croatia's coastal areas from the rest of the country. By the time of the killings at the Korana bridge, heavy JNA shelling had resulted in extensive damage to Karlovac's historic town centre.

== Killings ==
According to an account published by Amnesty International, on the evening of 21 September 1991, a group of predominantly Serb JNA reservists headed from Slunj towards Karlovac with the intention of relieving a besieged JNA garrison in the town. Upon reaching the bridge over the Korana River, they were intercepted by a local special unit which ordered them to surrender. One of the survivors, reservist Svetozar Šarac, stated that he and the other reservists stepped out of their vehicle in order to surrender and had clearly shown their intention to do so. They put their weapons and equipment on the pavement and lay on their stomachs, folding their arms behind their necks.

The reservists were then reportedly split in two, with nine being driven to the local police headquarters and later taken to Zagreb. The remaining reservists stayed at the bridge under the guard of police officer Mihajlo Hrastov and other law enforcement officials, who were waiting for vehicles from the Karlovac police headquarters to come and collect them. As they waited, three main battle tanks from the local JNA garrison fired at the bridge from a distance of 500 metres (1,600 ft). At this point, the reservists reportedly shouted or signaled to those in charge of the tanks to stop firing, which they did.

According to Šarac, the reservists were then ordered to step off the bridge and walk on a path leading to a fishermen's hut where they were again told to lie down. Shortly thereafter, one of the reservists had his throat slit. Šarac recounted that they were then ordered to go back to the bridge. Citing media reports, Amnesty International reported in 1991 that Hrastov had ordered the reservists to walk to the other side of the bridge and to line up against a parapet, at which point he began shooting at them. Šarac's testimony deviates from this account. According to him, three masked individuals carrying automatic rifles approached them from the direction of the Korana Hotel and opened fire. The victims of the massacre were later identified as Mile and Nikola Babić, Vaso Bižić, Svetozar Gojković, Zoran Komadina, Božo Kozlina, Milenko Lukač, Slobodan Milovanović, Mile Peurača, Nebojša Popović, Milić Savić, Jovan Sipić and Miloš Srdić. All were from the nearby village of Krnjak and its outskirts. Šarac, Duško Mrkić, Nebojša Jasnić and Branko Mađarac survived by jumping into the river.

In a report published shortly after the killings, the Croatian Ministry of the Interior described Hrastov as the sole perpetrator. It asserted that he had been distressed by the incoming tank fire and shot the prisoners in a panic. According to the Ministry of the Interior, the bodies of the dead were brought to the Institute for Forensic Medicine in Zagreb, where postmortem examinations were performed. Several days later, the bodies of the killed reservists were returned to their families. A medical commission from Vojnić reported that several of the bodies showed signs of severe mutilation.

== Aftermath ==
=== Legal proceedings ===
==== Karlovac County Court ====
Karlovac's District Public Prosecutor formally filed criminal charges against Hrastov on 22 September 1991. Despite this, he was not immediately detained. Instead, he was reassigned to the town of Bjelovar, in northern Croatia. He served as a member of an elite anti-terrorist unit of the Bjelovar Police Department until 5 March 1992, when he was arrested amidst increasing media scrutiny. In September 1992, he was acquitted on all counts by the Karlovac County Court after a four-day trial. In its ruling, the court accepted Hrastov's claim that he had killed the reservists in self-defence. The decision was met with a standing ovation from all present in the courtroom. The Supreme Court of Croatia subsequently annulled the verdict and ordered a retrial, but no further legal action was taken against Hrastov for the duration of the war. On 7 July 1995, he was awarded the Order of Nikola Šubić Zrinski by Croatian president Franjo Tuđman for "heroic deeds in wartime". During Operation Storm, Hrastov allegedly served as the commander of a detention camp in the town of Ozalj, where ethnic Serb prisoners were tortured. On 13 April 1996, he was named an honorary citizen of Karlovac by the Assembly of the Karlovac County Council. The decision was condemned by the Croatian Helsinki Committee.

In 2000, Hrastov's retrial commenced before the Karlovac County Court. Widely regarded as a war hero in the town, he enjoyed extensive support from local veterans' organizations during the proceedings. In 2002, he was again found not guilty on all counts. The verdict was subsequently appealed to the Supreme Court, which again ordered a retrial, citing "serious procedural violations". The second retrial commenced in 2004 and was marked by multiple interruptions, including Hrastov's admission to a psychiatric facility. This retrial ultimately concluded with Hrastov once again being found not guilty of all charges.

==== Supreme Court of Croatia ====
In 2008, the case was appealed to the Supreme Court for a third time. On this occasion, the Supreme Court decided it would preside over a third retrial itself and subsequently convicted Hrastov, sentencing him to eight years' imprisonment. On 24 November 2009, the conviction was upheld on appeal but Hrastov's sentence was reduced to seven years' imprisonment. In reaching its decision, the Supreme Court indicated that it considered Hrastov's military service during the war to have been a mitigating factor. The Association of Police Special Forces in Karlovac County expressed "bitterness" at the decision and made an appeal to veterans' organizations to refrain from "emotional reactions". The Croatian Cultural Council called the verdict "shameful and unsustainable", describing Hrastov as "a symbol of Karlovac's defence and a hero of the Homeland War".

In 2011, Hrastov was released after the Constitutional Court overturned his conviction, ruling that the Supreme Court's failure to publish the verdict had violated Hrastov's human rights. By this point, the trial had become one of the longest in Croatian judicial history. On 7 September 2012, the Supreme Court once again found Hrastov found guilty of killing the reservists and sentenced him to four years' imprisonment. In its ruling, the court declared that Hrastov's actions had constituted a war crime. Judge Žarko Dundović justified the relatively short sentence on the grounds that Hrastov did not otherwise have a criminal history, that he was 70 percent disabled and suffered from post-traumatic stress disorder, and that his wife was also ill. Zoran Pušić, president of the Citizens' Committee for Human Rights (GOLJP), remarked at a subsequent press conference that "it is difficult to see how four years in prison could be an adequate sentence for killing 13 people." Veselinka Kastratović, a representative of the non-governmental organization Center for Peace, Non-violence and Human Rights, noted that the Supreme Court had failed to properly examine testimonies which indicate that there were other perpetrators in addition to Hrastov who were involved in the massacre. On 7 May 2015, the Supreme Court upheld Hrastov's four-year sentence. On this occasion, the ruling failed to explicitly refer to the massacre as a war crime, describing it instead as "the unlawful killing and wounding of enemies."

In April 2021, Hrastov complained to the HINA news agency that the Croatian judiciary had ordered him to pay the Croatian government more than €350,000—the amount the government had paid out as compensation to the families of his victims. Željko Sačić of the right-wing Croatian Sovereignists subsequently raised the issue in the Croatian Parliament, saying he was "shocked and upset" by the news. "Hrastov served two-and-a-half years in prison," Sačić remarked, "his trials went on for 25 years, and in the end, he and his family will be financially destroyed for the benefit of the Greater Serbian aggressor."

=== Commemorations ===
In September 2013, to mark the 22nd anniversary of the massacre, mourners placed flowers and candles at the Korana bridge. This makeshift memorial was quickly removed by Croatian war veterans. Alojzije Čerkez, the president of the Karlovac branch of the Croatian Disabled Homeland War Veterans' Association (HVIDR-a), described it as "a provocation which must be cut off at the roots." On 21 September 2020, the Serbian National Council held a ceremony at the Church of St. Nicholas in Karlovac to mark the 29th anniversary of the killings. The ceremony was originally intended to be held at the bridge, but was moved to the church after Croatian war veterans organized demonstrations on and around the bridge. Prior to the planned gathering, Karlovac mayor Damir Mandić wrote a post on Facebook discouraging the organizers from holding a ceremony at the bridge and accused them of attempting "to deny the Greater Serbia policy of [Slobodan Milošević]," a claim the organizers rejected.

On 1 July 2021, Croatian president Zoran Milanović made comments that were widely perceived as being supportive of Hrastov at an event commemorating the Grom Special Police Unit of which Hrastov was a member. On the evening of 21–22 September 2021, the thirtieth anniversary of the massacre, the Town Assembly of Karlovac voted to rename the Korana bridge the Grom Special Police Unit Bridge. The initiative came from supporters of the football club Dinamo Zagreb (the Bad Blue Boys) and veterans' associations. The majority for the decision came from the local branch of the HDZ and the Homeland Movement. Representatives of the local branch of the Social Democratic Party of Croatia collectively left the session in protest. The move was also condemned by the opposition party We Can! – Political Platform. The renaming of the bridge was followed by the unveiling of a mural commemorating Hrastov later that evening. Although he expressed support for the renaming of the bridge, mayor Mandić declined to attend the unveiling of the mural.
