= NK Mostanje =

Croatian football club

- Full name: Nogometni klub Mostanje Auto Lim-Lak
- Founded: 7 March 1949; 76 years ago
- Ground: Stadion NK Mostanje
- Capacity: 200
- League: Karlovac county league
Home colours	Away colours

NK Mostanje ALL is a Croatian football club based in the city of Karlovac.
