= Karlovac Piano Festival =

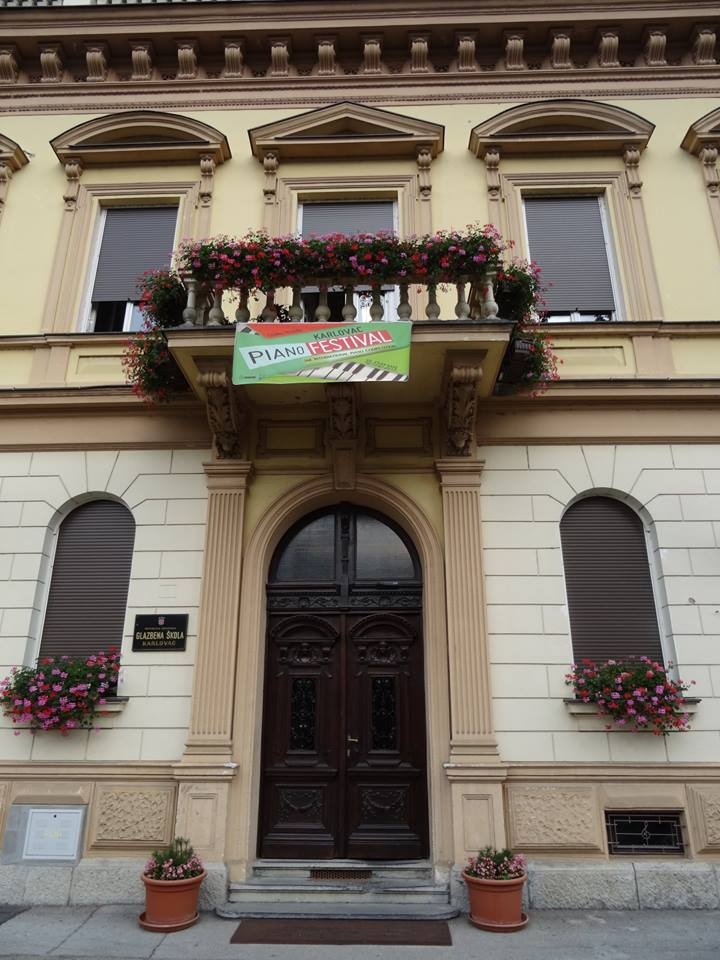
Karlovac Music School

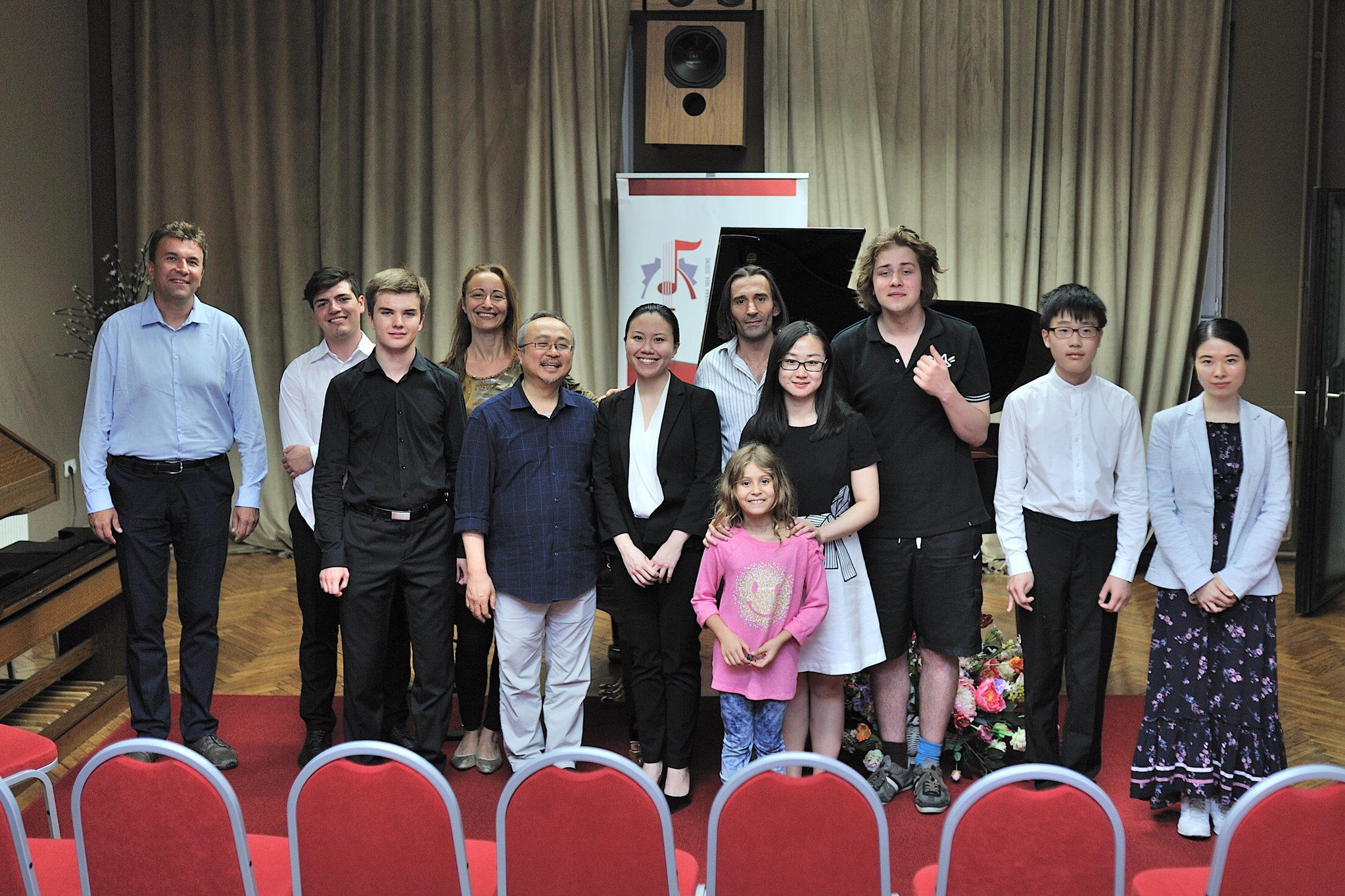
Faculty and summer school participants (2019)

Karlovac Piano Festival is a diverse musical project taking place in Karlovac, Croatia. The festival is hosted by Karlovac Music School, which is the oldest musical institution in Croatia, founded in 1804. The festival was established in 2013, and has been held annually during the month of July. Its program consists of educational activities such as master-classes, individual lessons, as well as guest artist and student recitals. Since 2014, the festival also features Karlovac International Piano Competition, which in 2016 has been endorsed by Alink-Argerich Foundation. The faculty and competition jury list includes Dang Thai Son, Kemal Gekić, Anna Malikova, Vladimir Ovchinnikov, Liu Shikun, Vladimir Viardo, Piotr Paleczny, and others.

== Karlovac International Piano Competition ==
The list of First Prize winners:

- 2014: (Poland) Karolina Nadolska / (Russia) Maria Tretyakova, (tie)
- 2015: (Croatia) Lovre Marušić
- 2016: (Hong Kong) Hei Wan Rhythmie Wong
- 2017: First Prize not awarded, Second Prize: (Slovenia) Maja Gombač
- 2018: (Ukraine) Elena Ovcharenko
- 2019: (China) Xu Guo
