= Knez Gorica =

- Village
- Location within Croatia
- Coordinates: 45.431°N 15.659°E
- Country: Croatia
- County: Karlovac County
- City: Karlovac

Area
  - Total: 3.4 km^{2} (1.3 sq mi)

Population (2021)
  - Total: 106
  - Density: 31/km^{2} (81/sq mi)
- Time zone: UTC+1 (CET)
  - Summer (DST): UTC+2 (CEST)
- Postal code: 51326
- Area code: +385 051

Knez Gorica is a village in Croatia, under the Karlovac township, in Karlovac County.
