= Karlovačka pivovara =

Brewery in Karlovac, Croatia

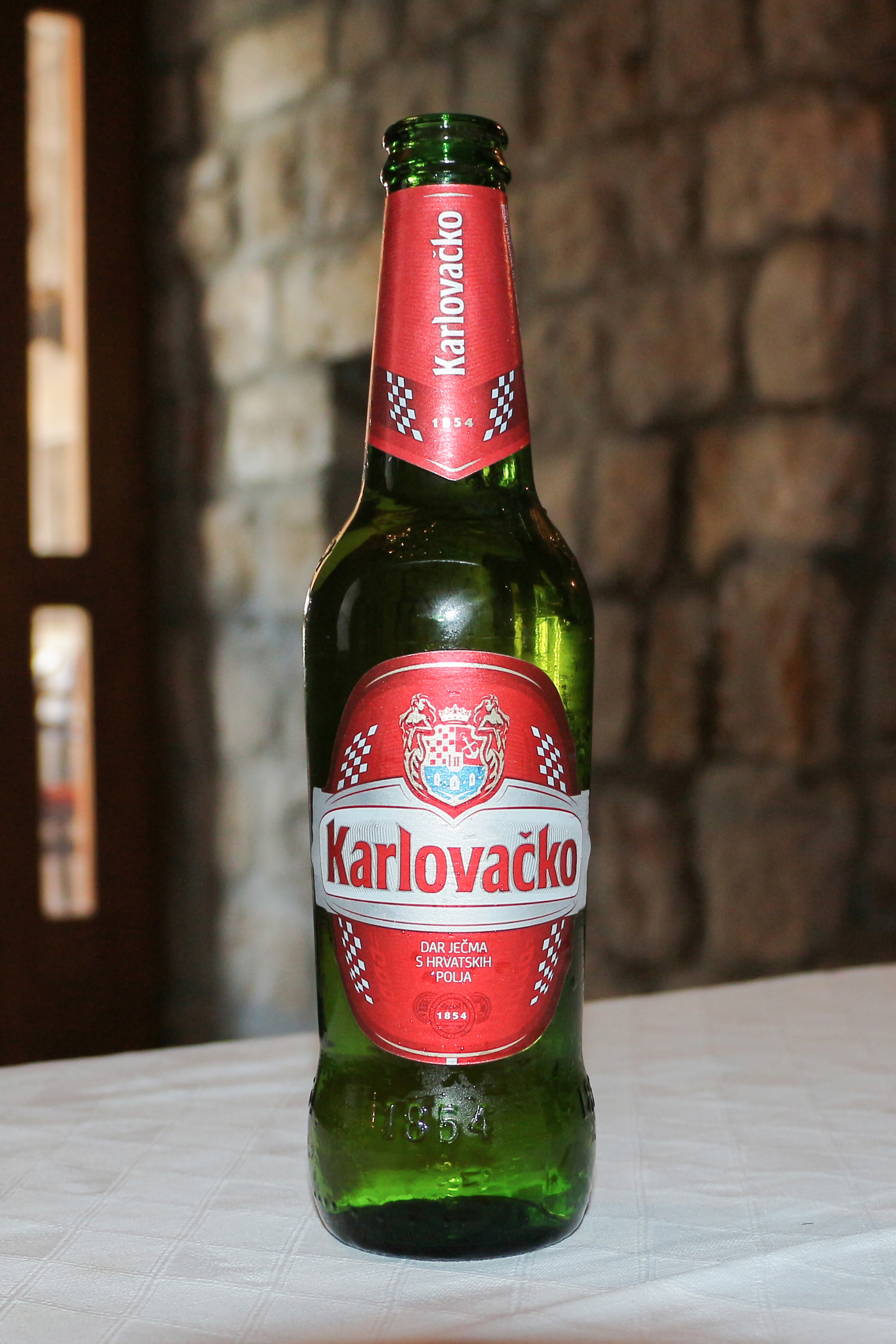
- Karlovačko beer
- Industry: Brewing
- Founded: 1854
- Headquarters: Karlovac, Croatia
- Products: Beer
- Owner: Heineken N.V.
- Website: www.karlovacko.hr

Karlovačka pivovara (lit. "Karlovac Brewery"), since 2013 formally Heineken Hrvatska d.o.o., is a brewery in Karlovac, Croatia, founded in 1854 by local landowner Baron Nikola Vranyczany-Dobrinović. In 2003, Heineken International acquired a majority stake. Heineken Hrvatska has 329 employees, 12 brands and Karlovačko beer is enjoyed in 10 countries.

The brewery's signature Karlovačko beer has an alcohol content of about 5.4 percent by volume.

The brewery produces the following brands of beer:

- Karlovačko 0.0% Max
- Karlovačko crno beer
- Karlovačko Leđero Natur Radler
- Karlovačko light lager beer
- Karlovačko Radler limun

== Awards ==
Karlovačko light lager beer won many awards, and in September 2005, it won the gold medal in its category, the so-called beer Oscar at the prestigious Brewing Industry International Awards held in Munich. In 2012, Karlovačko received another award for quality, Monde Selection awarded by the International Institute for Quality Selections.

== Croatian barley for production of Karlovačko beer ==
In July 2014, HEINEKEN Hrvatska has launched an initiative of Croatian barley for the production of Karlovačko beer. With this project, they have committed to use barley that is of Croatian origins, from Croatian fields. After signing the letter of intent for cooperation between project partners, the first Karlovačko beer with Croatian barley was launched on the market in February 2015. With this project, they wanted to ensure the sustainable domestic production of the key ingredient in order to influence the development and support of the local economy.

== 2007 incident ==
On 13 March 2007, prosecutors in Karlovac County decided to launch an investigation against five executives of the brewery, as well as the company as a legal entity, on suspicion that the brewery dumped carbon dioxide waste into local stream Grabica. Previously, work at the brewery was ordered to a temporary halt to weigh possible action. On 23 February, an elderly man named Zdravko Martinović fell comatose while walking his dog near the canal outside the brewery, after attempting to revive his dog, which died on the spot. He was found to have high levels of ammonia in his blood, although this was later denied, and claimed that he was poisoned by carbon dioxide. Martinović died on 19 March and although he was also a retired worker from the brewery, it was only after his death that Monique Peters, President of the Board, expressed sympathy to his family.

== Notes ==
dioničko društvo, company limited by shares, equivalent to AG
