= Banska Selnica =

Village in Karlovac County, Croatia

- Location within Croatia
- Coordinates: 45.504°N 15.729°E
- Country: Croatia
- County: Karlovac
- City: Karlovac

Area
  - Total: 3.3 km^{2} (1.3 sq mi)

Population (2021)
  - Total: 63
  - Density: 19/km^{2} (49/sq mi)
- Time zone: UTC+1 (CET)
  - Summer (DST): UTC+2 (CEST)

Banska Selnica is a small village in Karlovac County, Croatia. Banska Selnica is 18.7km (cca. 11.62 miles) away from Karlovac. It is located south of the Kupa river and the D36 road.

According to the Croatian Bureau of Statistics, in 2001, its population was 122. As of the 2021 census, Banska Selnica had a population of 63 residents. The village covers an area of 3.17 square kilometers.
