= Zadobarje =

Coordinates: 45°31′50″N 15°29′05″E

- Village
- Interactive map of Zadobarje
- Country: Croatia

Area
  - Total: 2.5 sq mi (6.6 km^{2})

Population (2021)
  - Total: 315
  - Density: 120/sq mi (48/km^{2})
- Time zone: UTC+1 (CET)
  - Summer (DST): UTC+2 (CEST)

Zadobarje is a village in Croatia.
