= Karlovačko =

Popular beer in Croatia and Bosnia and Herzegovina

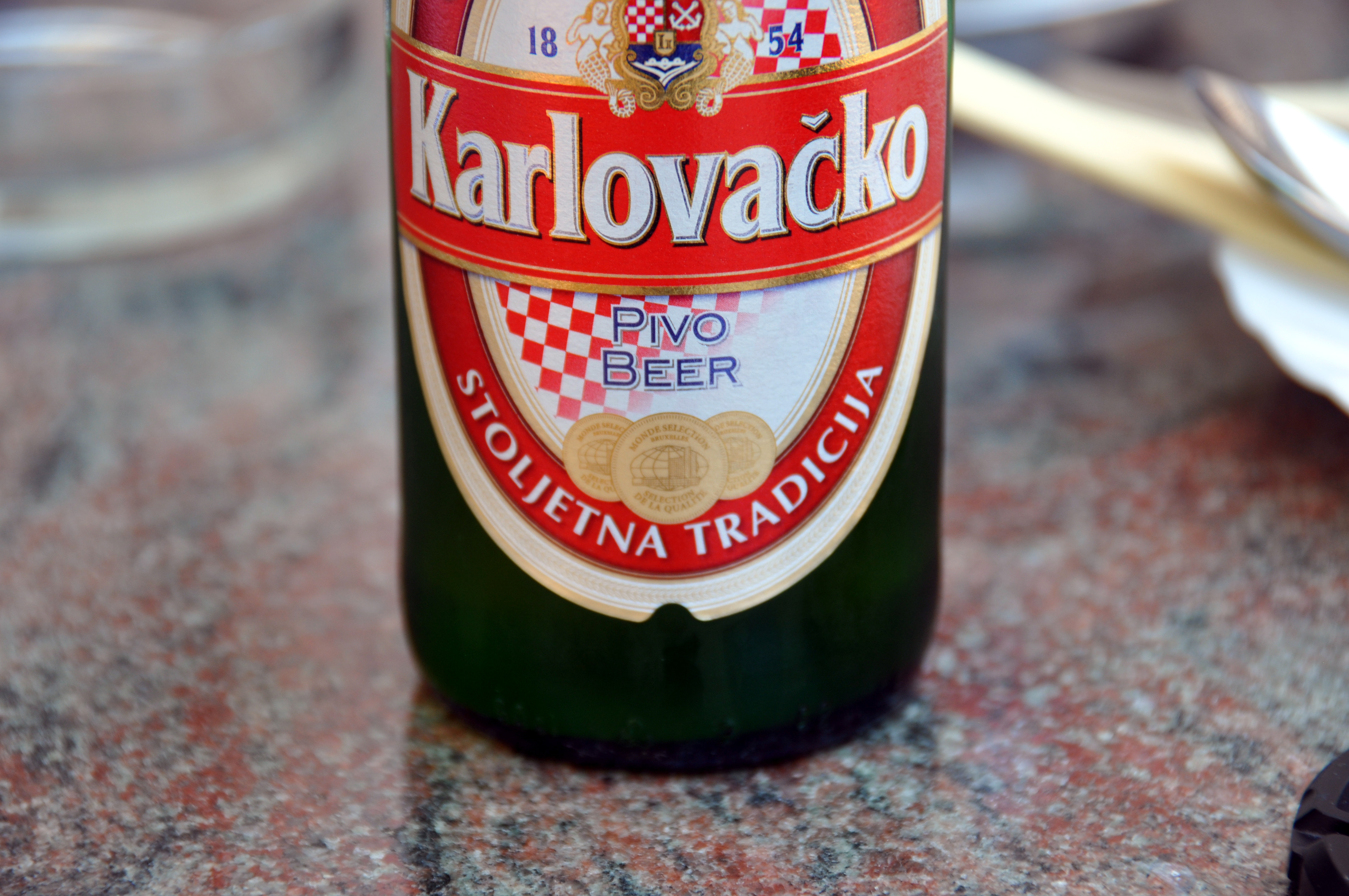

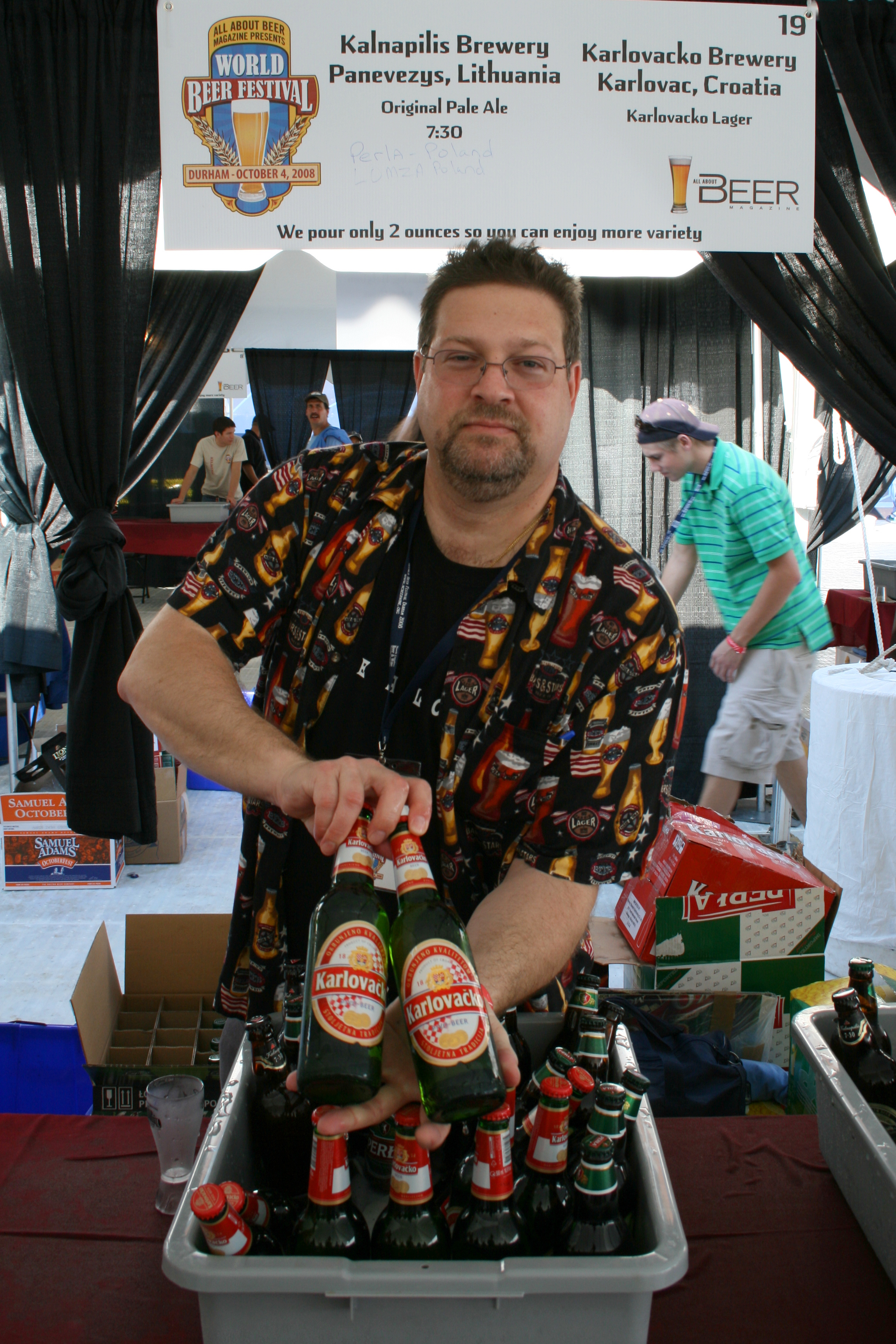
- Fred Gilbert, an Ararat Import Export Co. sales representative, shows off bottles of Karlovačko lager from Croatia at the 13th Annual World Beer Festival held at the Durham Bulls Athletic Park in Durham, North Carolina
- Type: Beer
- Location: Karlovac, Croatia

Karlovačko is a popular beer in Croatia and Bosnia and Herzegovina. It is the signature product of brewer Karlovačka Pivovara, a Heineken International subsidiary, located in the city of Karlovac. It has an alcohol content of about 5.4 percent by volume. Its makers describe it as "golden-yellow" in color and "refreshingly" bitter in taste. It won a 2005 Brewing Industry International Award golden medal in the category of beers with 4.5 to 5.5 percent alcohol. Pictured here in a brown bottle, Karlovačko is now sold in green bottles (also in cans and plastic packaging).

Heineken International acquired Karlovačko on 1 April, 2003. Karlovačka pivovara subsequently took the name Heineken Hrvatska d.o.o. on 10 December 2014. Heineken Hrvatska's range of beers includes: Karlovačko 0.0% Maxx, Karlovačko Limun Natur Radler, Karlovačko Laganini Natur Radler, Karlovačko Leđero Natur Radler, Karlovačko nepasterizirano Retro, Krušovice, Stari Lisac apple cider and Karlovačko crno. They also have international brands such as Heineken, Amstel Premium Pilsener, Edelweiss Snowfresh, Desperados, Affligem, cider No 1 in the world - Strongbow and Stari lisac, local cider. In their portfolio there are also Laško Zlatorog, Laško Special beers in three flavors and Union Radler grapefruit.

Croatian barley for production of Karlovačko beer

In July 2014, Heineken Hrvatska has launched an initiative of Croatian barley for the production of Karlovačko beer. With this project, they have committed to use barley that is of Croatian origins, from Croatian fields. After signing the letter of intent for cooperation between project partners, the first Karlovačko beer with Croatian barley was launched on the market in February 2015. With this project, they wanted to ensure the sustainable domestic production of the key ingredient in order to influence the development and support of the local economy.
