= Cerovac Vukmanićki =

Coordinates: 45°25′37″N 15°36′18″E

- Village
- Interactive map of Cerovac Vukmanićki
- Country: Croatia
- County: Karlovac County

Area
  - Total: 8.7 km^{2} (3.4 sq mi)

Population (2021)
  - Total: 787
  - Density: 90/km^{2} (230/sq mi)
- Time zone: UTC+1 (CET)
  - Summer (DST): UTC+2 (CEST)

Cerovac Vukmanićki is a village in Croatia. It is connected by the D1 highway.
