= Kobilić Pokupski =

Coordinates: 45°28′52″N 15°37′37″E

- Village
- Interactive map of Kobilić Pokupski
- Country: Croatia
- County: Karlovac County

Area
  - Total: 2.0 km^{2} (0.77 sq mi)

Population (2021)
  - Total: 35
  - Density: 18/km^{2} (45/sq mi)
- Time zone: UTC+1 (CET)
  - Summer (DST): UTC+2 (CEST)

Kobilić Pokupski is a village in Croatia.

== Bibliography ==
- Martinković (1854-04-10) [written 1854-03-14]. "Poziv od strane ureda c. kr. podžupani karlovačke nižepodpisani vojnoj dužnosti podvèrženi momci". Carsko kraljevske službene narodne novine (in Serbo-Croatian). Vol. 20, no. 82. p. 217. ISSN 1333-5243.
- Podžupan (1859-07-27) [written 1859-06-14]. "Poziv". Carsko kraljevske službene narodne novine (in Serbo-Croatian). Vol. 20, no. 170. pp. 433–434. ISSN 1333-5243.
