= Šebreki =

- Village
- Location within Croatia
- Coordinates: 45°34′N 15°33′E
- Country: Croatia

Area
  - Total: 0.2 km^{2} (0.077 sq mi)

Population (2021)
  - Total: 0
  - Density: 0.0/km^{2} (0.0/sq mi)
- Time zone: UTC+1 (CET)
  - Summer (DST): UTC+2 (CEST)

Šebreki is a settlement in Karlovac County, Croatia. As of the 2001 census, it has 0 residents.
