= Šišljavić =

Coordinates: 45°31′N 15°46′E

- Village
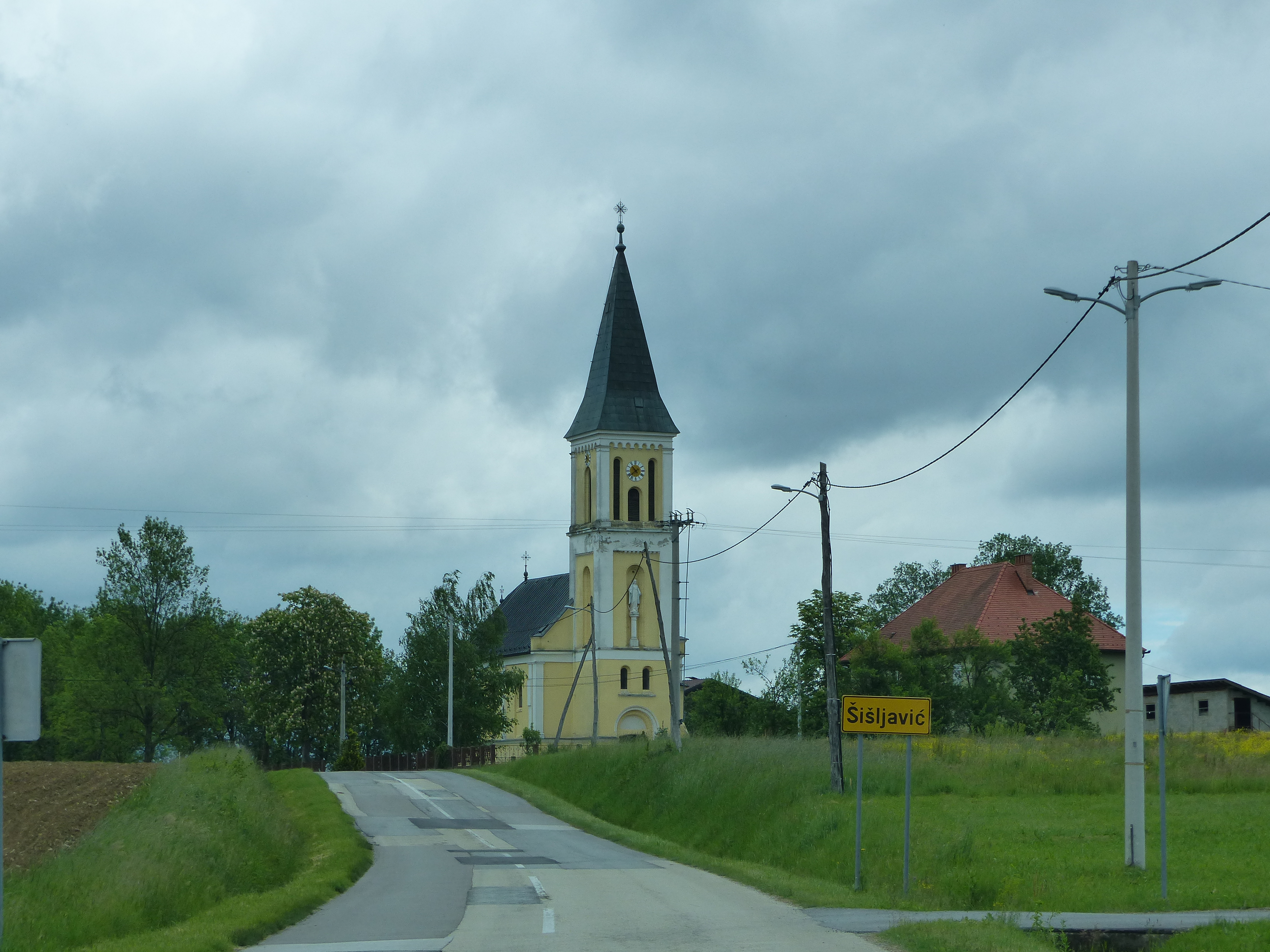
- Interactive map of Šišljavić
- Country: Croatia
- County: Karlovac County

Area
  - Total: 23.5 km^{2} (9.1 sq mi)

Population (2021)
  - Total: 358
  - Density: 15.2/km^{2} (39.5/sq mi)
- Time zone: UTC+1 (CET)
  - Summer (DST): UTC+2 (CEST)

Šišljavić is a village in Croatia. It is connected by the D36 highway. As of 2001 there were 714 inhabitants.

== History ==
On 26 March 2022 at 14:34 the ŽVOC Karlovac received a call about a wildfire in the area. 20 hectares (49 acres) burned by the time it was put out at 18:20 by DVD Šišljavić and DVD Koritnja.
