= Skakavac, Croatia =

Village in Croatia

Coordinates: 45°28′N 15°43′E

- Village
- Interactive map of Skakavac, Croatia
- Country: Croatia
- County: Karlovac County

Area
  - Total: 7.8 km^{2} (3.0 sq mi)

Population (2021)
  - Total: 227
  - Density: 29/km^{2} (75/sq mi)
- Time zone: UTC+1 (CET)
  - Summer (DST): UTC+2 (CEST)

Skakavac, Croatia is a village in Croatia.
