= Ladvenjak =

Coordinates: 45°25′N 15°36′E

- Village
- Interactive map of Ladvenjak
- Country: Croatia

Area
  - Total: 2.8 sq mi (7.2 km^{2})

Population (2021)
  - Total: 402
  - Density: 140/sq mi (56/km^{2})
- Time zone: UTC+1 (CET)
  - Summer (DST): UTC+2 (CEST)

Ladvenjak is a village in Croatia.
