= Korana =

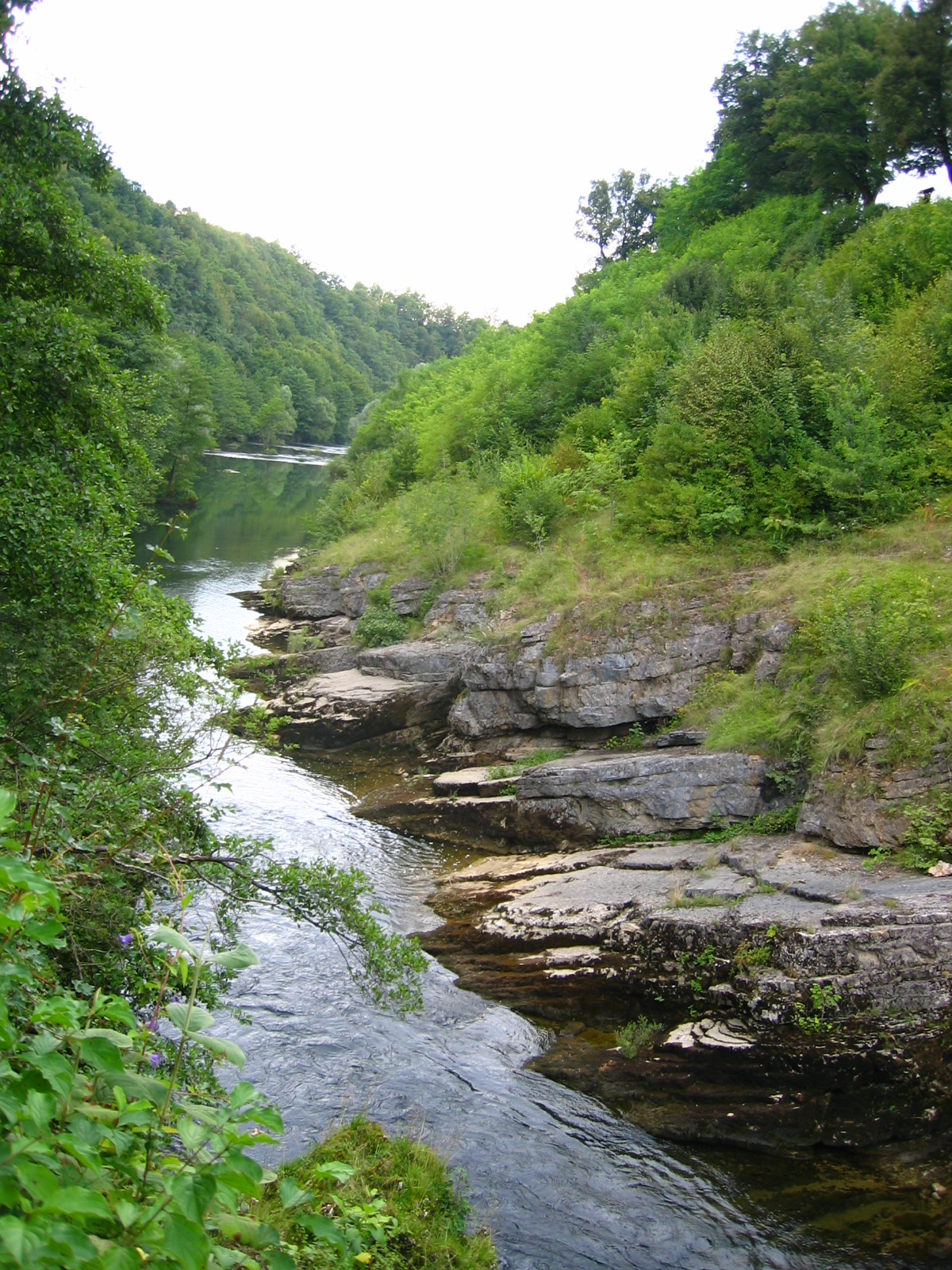
- Korana canyon at Slunj

Location
- Countries: Croatia; Bosnia and Herzegovina

Physical characteristics
- Mouth
  - location: Kupa
  - coordinates: 45.500°N 15.575°E
- Length: 138.6 km (86.1 mi)
- Basin size: 2,301.5 km^{2} (888.6 sq mi)

Basin features
- Progression: Kupa→ Sava→ Danube→ Black Sea

The Korana is a river in central Croatia and west Bosnia and Herzegovina. The river has a total length of 138.6 km (86.1 mi) and watershed area of 2,301.5 km^{2} (888.6 mi^{2}).

The river's name is derived from Proto-Indo-European *karr- 'rock'. It was recorded in the 13th century as Coranna and Corona.

Korana rises in the eastern parts of Lika and creates the Plitvice Lakes, a UNESCO World Heritage Site.

The length of the Korana is a matter analyzed by geographers because of its ambiguity. The toponym Korana is used for the river flow after the last Plitvice waterfall of Sastavci, at the confluence with the river Plitvica. However, using the natural river flow, the main waterway of the lakes and its headwater Bijela rijeka is part of Korana, which would add another 13 km (8.1 mi) to the length.

Downstream from Plitvice Lakes, the Korana river forms a 25 kilometers long border between Croatia and Bosnia and Herzegovina near Cazin. From there it flows northwards through Croatia, where it finally reaches the river Kupa at Karlovac.

The soil of the karst region, through which this river flows consists of limestone. Under certain physical and chemical conditions the river is constantly creating new soil from plants (see: Plitvice Lakes).

The river Slunjčica flows into Korana at Rastoke/Slunj, and the river Mrežnica flows into it at Karlovac.

In the Korana exist rich molluscan assemblages composed of 33 species.

== See also ==
- Plitvice Lakes
- Una

== Sources ==
- Šimunović, Petar (March 2013). "Predantički toponimi u današnjoj (i povijesnoj) Hrvatskoj" [Pre-Roman placenames in present-day (and historical) Croatia] (PDF). Folia Onomastica Croatica (in Croatian) (22). Zagreb: Croatian Academy of Sciences and Arts: 147–214.
- Karlovac: četiri rijeke - jedan grad (in Croatian)
