= Antun Radić =

Austria-Hungary politician

Member of the Croatian Parliament (Three terms)
- In office 1910–1913

Personal details
- Born: 11 June 1868 Desno Trebarjevo, Kingdom of Croatia-Slavonia, Austria-Hungary
- Died: 19 February 1919 (aged 50) Zagreb, Kingdom of Serbs, Croats and Slovenes
- Resting place: Mirogoj cemetery, Zagreb, Croatia
- Party: Croatian Peasant Party
- Spouse: Vilma Radić
- Relatives: Stjepan Radić (brother)
- Occupation: Scientist, writer, translator, journalist, sociologist, ethnographer, politician

Antun Radić (Desno Trebarjevo, 11 June 1868 – Zagreb, 10 February 1919) was a Croatian scientist, writer, translator, journalist, sociologist, ethnographer and politician. He is the founder of Croatian ethnography.

== Biography ==
=== Early life and education ===
Antun Radić was born in Desno Trebarjevo, Martinska Ves near Sisak in the Kingdom of Croatia-Slavonia within Austria-Hungary as the eighth of eleven children in the family of poor peasants, Ana (née Posilović) and Imbra Radić. His younger brother, born as the ninth child, was Croatian politician Stjepan Radić.

After finishing elementary school in Martinska Ves, Radić went to Zagreb where he continued his education in the elite Upper Town Gymnasium, after which he enrolled in the study of Slavic Studies and Classical Philology at the Universities in Zagreb and Vienna. He received his PhD from the University of Zagreb in 1892 with the thesis "On some eschatological motifs in Croatian literature".

=== Professional work ===
Since 1892, Radić worked as a teacher in schools in Osijek, Požega, Varaždin and Zagreb. After 1897 parliamentary elections, at the request of Ban Károly Khuen-Héderváry, Radić was discharged from the service because he did not want to vote for the pro-Hungarian government candidate.

From 1897 to 1901, he worked as editor of the "Almanac of public life and customs of the South Slavs". From 1901 to 1909, he worked as secretary of the Matica hrvatska and was one of the founders and editors of "Voice of Matica hrvatska" magazine. Radić was also the founder of Dom magazine, published between 1899 and 1904. Subtitled "Paper for the Croatian peasant for talk and lesson", it was the first Croatian magazine for peasants, which contributed to the cultural and national-political development of the Croatian villages. In 1917, Radić took a job as a professor at Zagreb Upper Town Gymnasium, where he taught until his death.

=== Political work ===
On 22 December 1904, Antun and Stjepan founded Croatian Peoples' Peasant Party (HPSS). In 1910 parliamentary election, he was elected to the Croatian Parliament. During his term in office, he actively advocated the reform of local government and educational system. As a member of HPSS, he was elected to the Parliament three times (1910, 1911, 1913).

=== Death ===
Antun Radić died on 10 February 1919. After his death, authorities in the newly established Kingdom of Serbs, Croats, and Slovenes did not grant a pension to his widow Vilma so she lost her livelihood and when she got a court order to leave the apartment for not paying the rent, she went on July 6, 1919, to his grave and drank poison which killed her. At that time, the authorities persecuted and imprisoned many leaders of Croatian Peasant Party and it was thought that Vilma actually committed suicide in protest against those persecutions. He was buried at Mirogoj cemetery on 12 February 1919.

== Scientific work ==
Radić greatly influenced political activity of his brother Stjepan with his ethnological research. He emphasized the connection between the national liberation with social issues, warning that complete national freedom cannot be achieved by the simple removal of foreign national oppression. In addition to folklore, Radić also dealt with the literary and historical topics in his scientific papers and also translated works of prominent Russian writers (Pushkin, Gogol and Tolstoy).

Antun Radić reputedly spoke Croatian, Latin, German, French, Italian, Czech, Bulgarian, Polish and Russian, all fluently.

== Legacy ==
Many schools, streets and squares across Croatia were named after Antun Radić. In 1995, Order of Danica Hrvatska was established. The award is divided into seven equally valuable decorations, one of which, awarded for special merits in education, is named after Antun Radić.

== Works ==
- O nekim eshatološkijem motivima u hrvatskoj kniževnosti [On some eschatological motifs in Croatian literature], Tisak Dioničke tiskare, Zagreb, 1893.
- Osnova za sabiranje i proučavanje građe o narodnom životu [The basis for the collection and study of materials on folk life], p. 1.-88., Zbornik za narodni život i običaje Južnih Slavena., book 2., Zagreb, 1897. (also edited books: no. 3, 1898.; no. 4, 1899.; no. 5, 1900.; no. 6, 1901.)
- Osnova za sabiranje i proučavanje građe o narodnom životu [The basis for the collection and study of materials on folk life], Tisak Dioničke tiskare, Zagreb 1897. Special print from book no. 2. from the Anthology of Folk Life and Customs of South Slavs
- "Život" t.j. Smrt hrvatskoga preporoda? ["Life" i.e. Death of the Croatian National Revival], Tisak C. Albrechta, Zagreb, 1899.
- Hrvati i Magjari ili Hrvatska politika i "Riečka rezolucija". [Croats and Hungarians or Croatian politics and "Resolution of Rijeka"], Politička knjižnica H. P. S. S., volume 1., Zagreb, 1905. Matica Hrvatska, Tiskara i litografija Mile Maravića, Zagreb, 1906. (special print: Hrvatska misao)
- Novinstvo i književnici prema Matici Hrvatskoj. [Press and writers to Matica Hrvatska] Knjige Matice Hrvatske za god. 1905., Tiskara i litografija Mile Maravića, Zagreb, 1906. (special print: Hrvatska misao)
- Što je i što hoće Hrvatska pučka seljačka stranka. [What is Croatian Peasant Party and what it wants], Ante Radić and Stjepan Radić, Hrvatska pučka seljačka tiskara, Zagreb, 1908.

=== Post mortem ===
- Osnova za sabiranje i proučavanje gradje o narodnom životu [The basis for the collection and study of the structure of national life], 2. ed., JAZU, Zagreb, 1929.
- Kako čovjek postaje čovjek [As a man becomes a man], Radićeva obrazovna knjižnica, vol 3, Zagreb, 1930. (2. ed., 1930.)
- Obrisi hrvatske povijesti u starom i srednjem vijeku [The contours of Croatian history in the ancient and medieval times], Radićeva obrazovna knjižnica, vol. 7, Zagreb, 1930. (2. ed., 1930.)
- Obrisi hrvatske povijesti u novom vijeku [The contours of Croatian history in the modern times], Radićeva obrazovna knjižnica, vol. 8, Zagreb, 1930.
- Sabrana djela dra Antuna Radića [The collected works of Dr. Antun Radić], b. I-XIX, Zagreb, 1936.-1939.
- Što si Hrvat ili Srbin: odabrano iz spisa Antuna Radića [What are you a Croat or a Serb: selected from the writings of Antun Radić], Biblioteka Gospodarski pogledi dr. Antuna Radića, ed. Ante Miljak, b. 1, Ljudevit, Vinkovci, 1990.
- Osnova za sabiranje i proučavanje građe o narodnom životu [The basis for the collection and study of the structure of national life], Dom i svijet, Zagreb, 1997 (predgovor: Andre Mohorovičić)

== Sources ==
- Perić, Ivo (2002). Antun Radić: 1868.-1919: etnograf, književnik, političar (in Croatian). Zagreb: Dom i svijet. ISBN 953-6491-80-X.
- Rychlik, Jan (December 2015). "Braća Radić i Hrvatska seljačka stranka" [The Brothers Antun and Stjepan Radić and the Croatian Peasant Party] (PDF). Zbornik Janković (in Croatian). 1 (1).
