= Croatian National Youth =

1922–1929 militant organisation in the Kingdom of Yugoslavia

- Croatian: Hrvatska nacionalna omladina
- Dates active: 1922–1929
- Active regions: Kingdom of Serbs, Croats and Slovenes

The Croatian National Youth (Croatian: Hrvatska nacionalna omladina), which is often known as HANAO or Hanao, was established in early 1922 in Vukovar under the patronage of the Croatian Bloc, which consisted of the Croatian Peasant Party (HSS) (Note: The Croatian Peasant Party (HSS) was named the Croatian People's Peasant Party (HPSS) until late 1920 when its name was changed to the Croatian Republican Peasant Party. The party removed the word "Republican" from its name in 1925.) led by Stjepan Radić, the Croatian Union, and the Croatian Party of Rights (HSP). (Note: Sources often refer to the Croatian Party of Rights as the Frankists referencing the group's initial leader Josip Frank. The Party of Rights split in two in 1895 and its Frankist faction formed the Pure Party of Rights. The splinter party was renamed the Starčević Croatian Party of Rights in 1904, and its name changed again to the Party of Rights in 1910. The party was renamed the Croatian Party of Rights in 1919.) It was set up ostensibly to protect Croats against government-sponsored violence and violent actions of the Organization of Yugoslav Nationalists (ORJUNA). The HANAO, which itself resorted to violence and terrorism, quickly spread from Syrmia region throughout Croatia, Bosnia and Herzegovina.

The Croatioan Bloc used the HANAO to mobilise its voters, threaten political enemies, and to physically protect HSS political rallies. The HANAO's leadership gradually split into two factions; a moderate faction supported HSS policies and a more radical faction that supported the HSP. The HANAO became increasingly radical and its political positions coincided with those of the HSP, which in 1923 took over HANAO after the HSS publicly distanced itself from violence. The HANAO continued its terrorist activities under the HSP's protection until its ban following the introduction of the royal dictatorship in Yugoslavia.

== Background ==
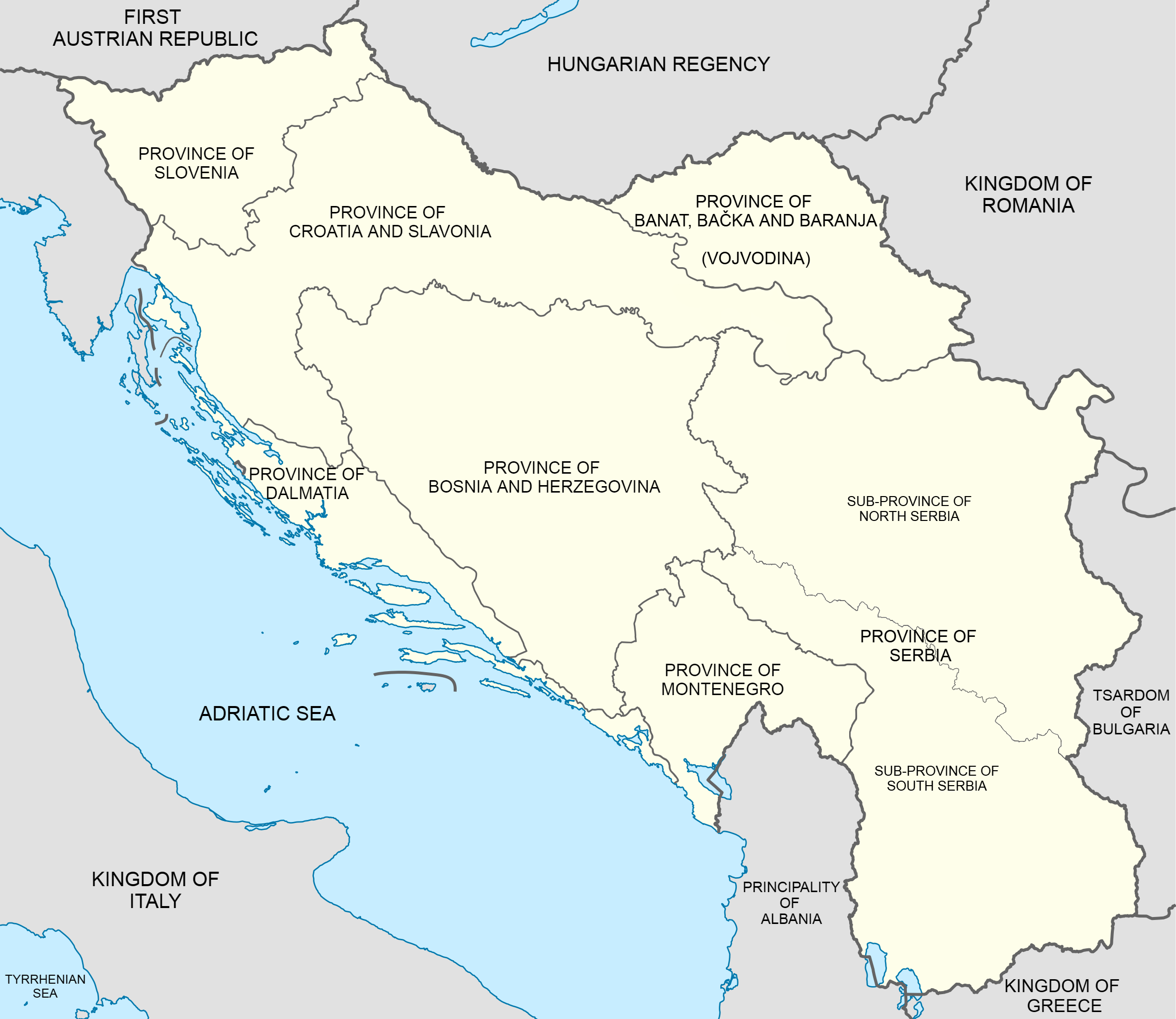
Provinces of Yugoslavia (1918–1922)

The Kingdom of Serbs, Croats and Slovenes (later renamed Yugoslavia) was proclaimed on 1 December 1918 as a common state of the South Slavs. A provisional, Serb-dominated government was appointed by the Prince Regent Alexander. The government and the Temporary National Representation, the provisional parliament, gradually set up a centalised system of government. At the same time, there was an ongoing debate whether the country should be a federation, a confederation or a unitary state, a republic or monarchy, and whether future members of parliament should swear an oath of allegiance to the king. The Croatian Peasant Party (HSS) led by Stjepan Radić was the most-vocal political party among the minority advocating a federal republic. The issue of the oath as a question of parliamentary sovereignty was also taken up by the Communist Party of Yugoslavia (KPJ). Proponents of a unitary, centralised government sought to consolidate the country's diverse ethnic groups in line with the integral Yugoslavism, amalgamating them into a single Yugoslav nation with a unified culture and language. This approach was adopted by the Serb-dominated Democratic Party (DS), which viewed Croats and Slovenes as branches of the Serbian nation. Another major, Serb-dominated political party, the People's Radical Party (NRS), preferred the preservation of cultural and national diversity while advocating for centralised government.

Following the country's 1920 Constitutional Assembly election, a majority formed by the DS, the NRS, and the Bosnian Muslim-dominated Yugoslav Muslim Organization adopted the Vidovdan Constitution that determined the system of government as a unitary centralised monarchy. Shortly after the election, HSS Radić announced the HSS would not participate in the work of the Constitutional Assembly because the elected party members would not swear an oath of allegiance, as required by the assembly's standing orders. Despite winning 50 seats, the HSS chose to refrain from parliamentary work, hoping to compel the government to abandon its intention to concentrate the bulk of the power in the central government and to initiate genuine negotiations on the system of government. The Croatian Party of Rights (HSP) followed the HSS's example, adding their two seats to the list of abstentionists.

The Croatian Union's four elected representatives took part in the assembly's work, in opposition to the government's draft constitution leading to a highly-centralised state and trying to persuade Radić to join them in the parliament. In May 1921, the Croatian Union also abandoned the parliament, protesting against decision-making by a simple majority. The Croatian Union claimed a qualified majority was needed for passage of the country's constitution based on the 1917 Corfu Declaration and the acts of the Croatian Sabor authorising separation from Austria-Hungary and unification of the South Slavs. On 12 May, Mate Drinković issued a declaration on behalf of the Croatian Union accusing the government of trying to impose its will on the Croats and denied the assembly's legitimacy to adopt any constitution that would be binding for Croatia and the Croats. The HSS, the HSP, and the Croatian Union drafted a declaration stating they formed the Croatian Bloc coalition to preserve Croatian national individuality. The coalition parties denied the remaining assembly was legitimate or entitled to enact a constitution binding for Croats or Croatia.

== Precursor ==
In June 1921, the Academic Croatian National Youth (Academic HANAO) was established at the University of Zagreb by former members of the Yugoslav Democratic Youth League who were disappointed by the centralisation of government during the creation of Yugoslavia. The founders thought of the late 19th and early 20th-century organisation Progressive Youth as a role model. The Academic HANAO claimed lineage from the Progressive Youth and it was initially ideologically close to the Croatian Union, the political party representing Croatian intelligentsia. The Academic HANAO established several branches, the most-significant of which was in Sarajevo. By 1924, the organisation switched its support to the HSS following the lead of the Croatian Union within the Croatian Bloc coalition, and was gradually merged into the HSS's student organisation.

== Founding ==
=== Establishment in Vukovar ===
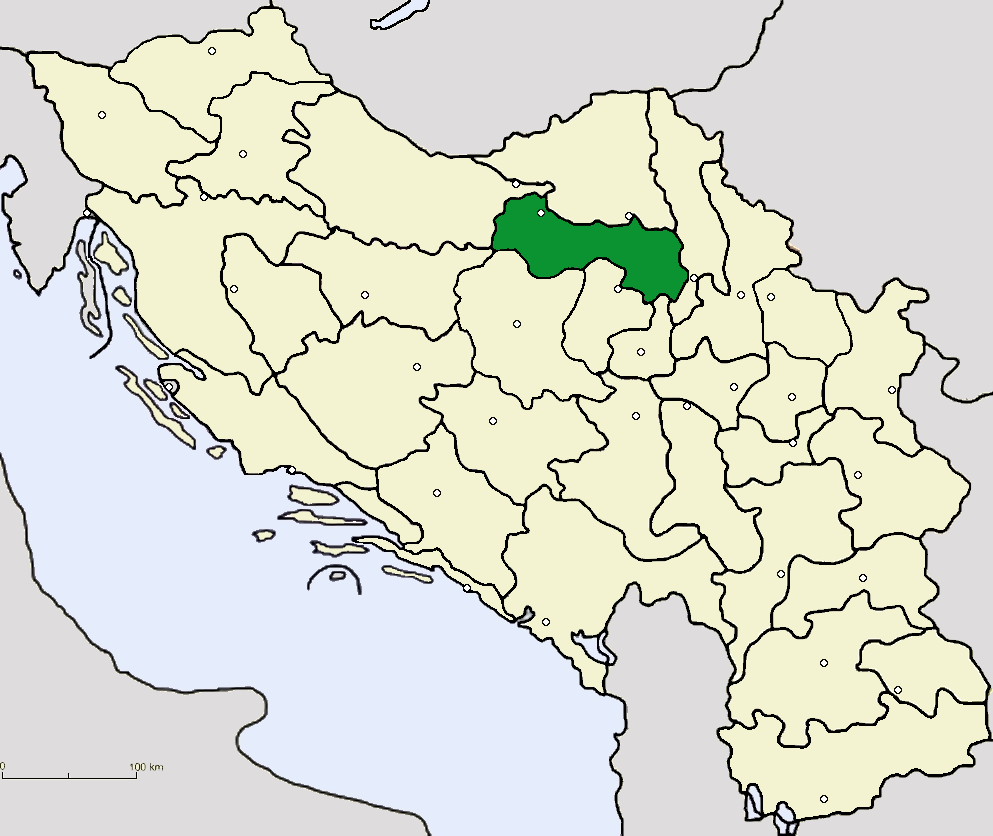
Syrmia oblast of Yugoslavia (1922–1929)

The Croatian National Youth (HANAO) was founded in Vukovar in early August 1922, a time of increased tensions between Croats and Serbs in the ethnically mixed Syrmia Oblast, corresponding to the former Syrmia County. The situation was complicated by the settlement of approximately 8,000 Serbs in Syrmia within the framework of land reform in interwar Yugoslavia. Most Croats considered Yugoslavia illegitimate due to adoption of the first Yugoslav constitution establishing it as a highly centralised monarchy by a simple majority without the participation of Croatian political representatives and contrary to the will of the majority of non-Serb parties.

Political parties fighting for power in Syrmia supported the establishment of nationalist organisations supportive of their political programmes. The NRS supported the establishment of Chetnik associations, while the DS, aided by the government, founded a branch of the Organization of Yugoslav Nationalists (ORJUNA) in Vukovar, the oblast's capital city where the Croatian Bloc had just won local elections. The latter was ostensibly established to protect Yugoslav unity and security of the state, and the ORJUNA soon started a campaign of attacks against Croatian nationalists. In the atmosphere of the political conflict at a time of parliamentary breakdown, the HANAO was established with the support of the Croatian Bloc in response to ORJUNA's activities. The HANAO initially consisted of University of Zagreb students, led by Franjo Gruber, who was also the editor-in-chief of the HANAO's periodical Gvozd published in Vukovar. Unlike the Academic HANAO, the organisation established in Vukovar was intended for middle-class membership. The HANAO quickly established branches elsewhere in Syrmia and in eastern Slavonia – in Osijek, Vinkovci, Petrovaradin, Mitrovica, Ilok, Nijemci, and Tovarnik.

=== Move to Zagreb ===
The HANAO quickly moved its headquarters to Zagreb, where it came under new leadership. It was initially led by Joe Matošić, the editor-in-chief of the HANAO's weekly newsletter Hrvatski borac (lit. 'Croatian Fighter'), before the HSS's Josip Reberski was appointed the president and Dragutin Perković the organisation's secretary. The HANAO was led by a council of representatives of Croatian Bloc members: the HSS was represented by the party's vice-president Rudolf Horvat; Mirko Košutić represented the HSP and Kerubin Šegvić represented the Croatian Union. The HANAO was organised territorially – each branch being referred to as župa (lit. 'parish'). (Note: There is some variation in naming of local branches being referred to as Hrvatska omladina or Hrvatska narodna omladina, as some branches omitted the word national from the name of the Croatian National Youth.) The HANAO continued to set up local branches after its move to Zagreb, especially in the period before the 1923 parliamentary elections. In Croatia, new organisations were set up in Bjelovar, Brod, Čačinci, Dubrovnik, Karlovac, Križevci, Novigrad, Perušić, Požega, Šibenik, Varaždin, Virovitica, and Vrbovec, as well as branches set up in Donji Vakuf, Sarajevo, Mostar, Teslić, and in Tuzla in Bosnia and Herzegovina.

== Activity ==
=== Ideology ===
The HANAO's declared purpose was the defence of the Croats' collective identity against Greater Serbian and Yugoslavist agendas; it was a loose association of youth organisations, most of whose activities consisted of violence against political adversaries. The HANAO's opponents branded it fascist and it shared some ideological traits with fascism, including the glorification struggle, sacrifice, duty and heroism. Unlike fascism, the HANAO insisted on maintaining national traditions. Its members particularly glorified the roles of Petar Zrinski and Fran Krsto Frankopan in the 17th-century Magnate conspiracy, as well as Matija Gubec, the leader of the 16th-century Croatian–Slovene Peasant Revolt.

=== Enemies and allies ===
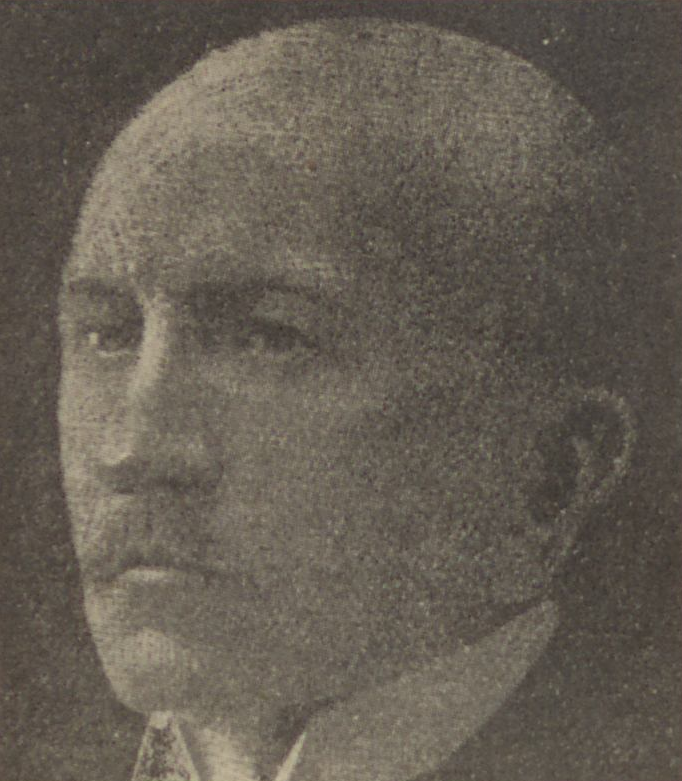
Miroslav Kulmer was criticised by the HANAO because of a First Croatian Savings Bank donation to the Independent Democratic Party.

The Croatian Bloc initially used the HANAO as a tool to mobilise its voters, threaten political enemies and physically protect the HSS's political rallies. The HANAO mostly came in conflict with the ORJUNA, resulting in violent, sometimes armed clashes, and dead and wounded on both sides in a cycle of retaliatory attacks. In Bosnia and Herzegovina, the HANAO mostly clashed with the Serbian National Youth (SRNAO), a more-extreme, NRS-backed organisation established in the belief the ORJUNA was insufficiently supportive of Serbian causes. Regardless of its terrorist activities, the HANAO enjoyed the support of Croats, especially in areas where it was seen as a response to the government repression and ORJUNA-related violence.

The HANAO initially maintained good relations with the KPJ, cooperating in fighting against the ORJUNA and the Chetniks. Some KPJ members also joined the HANAO and examples of cooperation with communists and the HANAO members acting as security at HSS rallies. Relations between the two organisations ended after the 1924 conference of the KPJ condemned cooperation with fascist organisations.

The HANAO also attacked Croats accused of supporting its political enemies. In one prominent case, a financial donation to the Serb-dominated Independent Democratic Party by the First Croatian Savings Bank's president Miroslav Kulmer angered the HANAO. The HANAO kept track of lectures and speeches of Croatian scholars, and attacked supporters of the centralisation of Yugoslavia. The HANAO expressed displeasure with the opinions of historian Ferdo Šišić and its publication later used Šišić's name pejoratively to brand people they disagreed with as subservient to the government. The HANAO was antisemitic, accusing Jews of putting their capital in service of Croatia's enemies.

=== Split with the HSS ===
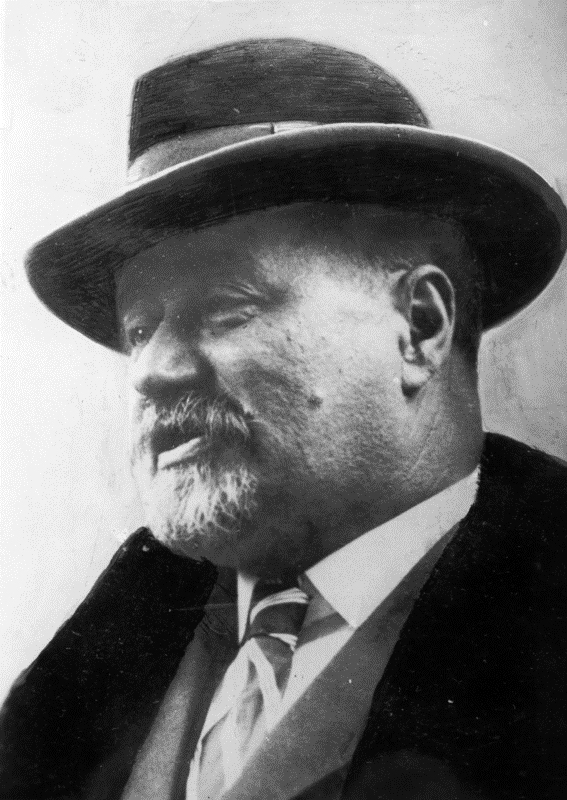
Stjepan Radić came into conflict with Vladimir Prebeg over the role of HSS and HSP in the Croatian Bloc.

In November 1922, the HSS initiated negotiations between the Croatian Bloc and the DS with the aim of bringing down the existing government and a revision of the constitution. Days later, the HSP pulled out of the talks. Radić came into conflict with HSP's leader Vladimir Prebeg over the negotiations and control of the Croatian Bloc. As a result of the conflict, the HSP was ejected from the coalition. By mid-1923, the rift in the Croatian Bloc was reflected in a split in the HANAO after the HSS leaders publicly distanced the party from violence, expressing their desire to pursue politics without hatred for Serbs.

A moderate faction of the HANAO supported the HSS while a radical faction sided with the HSP. The HSP-aligned faction accused Reberski and Horvat of accepting Serbs into the organisation, and accused the HSS of unwarranted pacifism and corruption. On 11 July 1923, the HSS issued a statement, concluding the HANAO came under HSP's influence and accusing the HSP of plotting against the HSS. The party withheld political and financial support from the HANAO, and the HSS members left their leading positions in the HANAO. As a result, during 1924, the HANAO lost a significant number of members. In late 1924, some HANAO branches in Bosnia and Herzegovina, and in Dalmatia, switched allegiance to the Academic HANAO, while the rest of the organisation became aligned with the HSP. The HANAO became increasingly radical, and its political positions coincided with those of the HSP. After the split, the HANAO continued terrorist activities in a reduced scope, and it was banned in 1929, weeks after introduction of the royal dictatorship in Yugoslavia.

== Aftermath ==
After the ban, former HANAO members continued terrorist activities in cooperation with the emigré Ustaše and established contacts with the Internal Macedonian Revolutionary Organization. There may have been an initiative of the HSS-led Peasant-Democratic Coalition to revive the HANAO in 1935. After the government of Milan Stojadinović launched a campaign of attacks against Croatian peasants using Chetnik forces following the 1935 Yugoslavian parliamentary election, the HSS established the paramilitary organisation the Croatian Peasant Defence (HSZ), which operated between 1936 and 1941.

== Sources ==
- Banac, Ivo (1984). The National Question in Yugoslavia: Origins, History, Politics. Ithaca: Cornell University Press. ISBN 978-0-8014-1675-0.
- Biondich, Mark (2000). Stjepan Radić, the Croat Peasant Party, and the Politics of Mass Mobilization, 1904-1928. Toronto: University of Toronto Press. ISBN 0-8020-4727-0.
- Gabelica, Mislav (2011). "Pravaška mladež na hrvatskom sveučilištu uoči Prvoga svjetskog rata" [Party of Rights' Youth at the Croatian University on the Eve of World War I]. Društvena istraživanja: časopis za opća društvena pitanja (in Croatian). 20 (4). Zagreb: Institut društvenih znanosti Ivo Pilar: 1139–1161. ISSN 1848-6096.
- Karaula, Željko (2008). "Hrvatska nacionalna omladina – (HANAO): prilog proučavanju djelovanja i rada hrvatskih omladinskih organizacija u Kraljevini SHS" [Croatian National Youth (HANAO). Activities of Croatian Youth Associations in the Kingdom of Serbs, Croats and Slovenes]. Historijski zbornik (in Croatian). 61 (2). Zagreb: Društvo za hrvatsku povjesnicu: 289–322. ISSN 0351-2193.
- Matković, Hrvoje (2000). "Stjepan Radić i Hrvatski blok" [Stjepan Radić and the Croatian Block]. Radovi Zavoda za hrvatsku povijest Filozofskoga fakulteta Sveučilišta u Zagrebu: Radovi Zavoda za hrvatsku povijest Filozofskoga fakulteta Sveučilišta u Zagrebu (in Croatian). 32–33 (1). Zagreb: University of Zagreb: 267–276. ISSN 0353-295X.
- Midlarsky, Manus I. (2011). Origins of Political Extremism: Mass Violence in the Twentieth Century and Beyond. Cambridge: Cambridge University Press. ISBN 978-0-521-70071-9.
- Ramet, Sabrina P. (2006). The Three Yugoslavias: State-building and Legitimation, 1918–2005. Bloomington: Indiana University Press. ISBN 9780253346568.
- Ramet, Sabrina P. (2007). "Vladko Maček and the Croatian Peasant Defence in the Kingdom of Yugoslavia". Contemporary European History. 16 (2). Cambridge: Cambridge University Press: 215–231. ISSN 0960-7773.
- Veselinović, Velimir (2018). "Pregled razvoja pravaške ideologije i politike" [An Overview of the Development of Rightist Ideology and Politics]. Časopis za suvremenu povijest (in Croatian). 50 (3). Zagreb: Croatian Institute of History: 583–620. ISSN 0590-9597.
- Vucinich, Wayne S. (1969). "Interwar Yugoslavia". In Vucinich, Wayne S. (ed.). Contemporary Yugoslavia: Twenty Years of Socialist Experiment. Berkeley: University of California Press. pp. 3–58. ISBN 9780520331112.
- Yeomans, Rory (2013). Visions of Annihilation: The Ustasha Regime and the Cultural Politics of Fascism, 1941–1945. Pittsburgh: University of Pittsburgh Press. ISBN 978-0-8229-6192-5.
