= Frankists (Croatia) =

Defunct Croatian political party (1895–1929)

Pure Party of Rights Starčević Croatian Party of Rights Croatian Party of Rights Čista stranka prava Starčevićeva hrvatska stranka prava Hrvatska stranka prava
- Leader: Josip Frank; Aleksandar Horvat; Vladimir Prebeg
- Founder: Josip Frank
- Founded: 22 October 1895
- Dissolved: 6 January 1929
- Split from: Party of Rights
- Headquarters: Zagreb
- Newspaper: Hrvatska
- Youth wing: Young Croatia

Frankists (Croatian: frankovci) were the political party formed when a faction of the Party of Rights led by Josip Frank split from the rest of the organisation. The party was originally named the Pure Party of Rights (Čista stranka prava). It changed names several times, ultimately becoming the Croatian Party of Rights (Hrvatska stranka prava) in the final decade before it was banned in 1929. Historiography often refers to the party as the Frankists, after its original leader. The Frankists were a Croatian nationalist organisation whose declared objectives and strategies changed depending on political developments.

Initially the Frankists sought a reform of Austria-Hungary and revision of the Croatian–Hungarian Settlement of 1868 to achieve unification of the Kingdom of Croatia-Slavonia with variously defined Croatian lands to achieve a Greater Croatia that would enjoy an equal constitutional position in the Habsburg monarchy to that enjoyed by the Kingdom of Hungary. To that end, the Frankists tried to obtain support from a group close to Archduke Franz Ferdinand of Austria and adopted anti-Serbian policies, believing they would curry favour with the Austrian allies. The Frankists opposed a competing political option of emancipation of the South Slavs through unification outside Austria-Hungary in accordance with the ideology of Yugoslavism. The Frankists objected to the creation of Yugoslavia as the common state of the South Slavs, disputing the legality of the unification. From 1919 on, the party advocated the use of legal means to achieve Croatia's independence, seeking assistance from fascist Italy in return for political and territorial concessions.

In the 1920s, the Frankists initially cooperated with the Croatian Peasant Party of Stjepan Radić before unsuccessfully seeking allies among Serb-dominated political parties to challenge them from the dominant position in the political life of Croatia. In the same period, the Frankists developed the so-called culture of defeat. It entailed emphasising the moral superiority of wartime sacrifice as a prerequisite for a future redemption of the First World War defeat. In the 1930s, Ante Pavelić used the same concept as a basis for founding the Ustaše movement.

== Background ==
=== Party of Rights ===
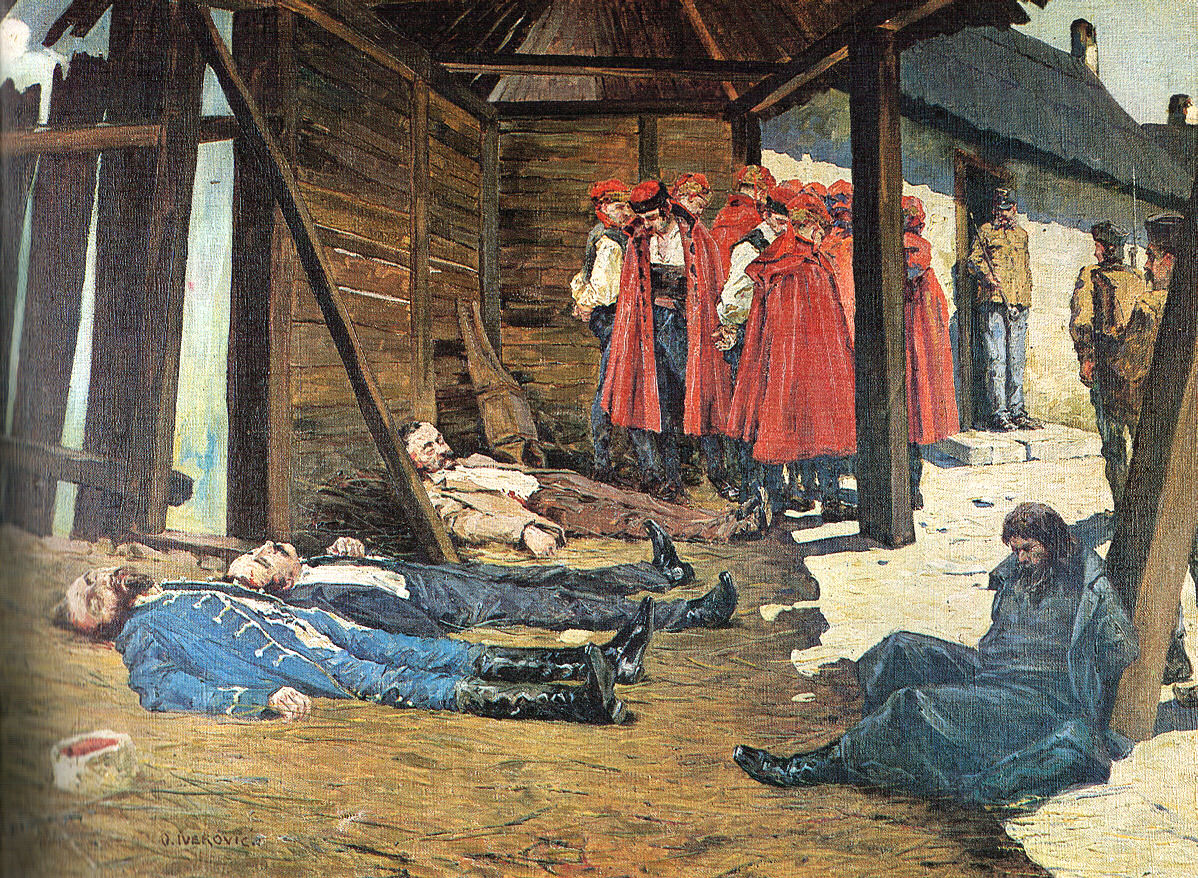
Oton Iveković's depiction of the 1871 Rakovica revolt

The Party of Rights was founded by Ante Starčević and Eugen Kvaternik in the Kingdom of Croatia, a realm of the Austrian Empire at the time. Inspired by the French Revolution of 1848 and disappointed with the suppression of the Revolutions of 1848 in the Austrian Empire, Starčević broke ties with the Illyrian movement, championing the Croatian national revival. He went on to establish the Party of Rights in the aftermath of the 1861 sitting of the Croatian Sabor. On 26 June 1861, in his speech at the assembly, Starčević endorsed Kvaternik's earlier speech at the same venue, supporting his ideas that Croatia deserved a position equal to that of the Kingdom of Hungary within the Austrian Empire by reference to the Croatian state right. Starčević and Kvaternik opposed forging closer ties between Croatia and Hungary than those existing between Vienna and Budapest. Six years later, the empire was reformed through the Austro-Hungarian Compromise of 1867. The Party of Rights opposed the reform. As a consequence, Kvaternik launched the unsuccessful Rakovica revolt in 1871, and Starčević retired from politics for six years following the revolt's suppression.

=== Political landscape ===
Austria–Hungary
Kingdoms and countries of Austria–Hungary:
Cisleithania (Empire of Austria): 1. Bohemia, 2. Bukovina, 3. Carinthia, 4. Carniola, 5. Dalmatia, 6. Galicia, 7. Küstenland, 8. Lower Austria, 9. Moravia, 10. Salzburg, 11. Silesia, 12. Styria, 13. Tyrol, 14. Upper Austria, 15. Vorarlberg;
Transleithania (Kingdom of Hungary): 16. Hungary proper 17. Croatia-Slavonia;
Austro-Hungarian condominium: 18. Bosnia and Herzegovina

In the late 19th century, the politics of the Kingdom of Croatia-Slavonia, a realm of Austria-Hungary at the time, were dominated by the outcomes of the Compromise of 1867 and the Croatian–Hungarian Settlement of 1868. The former divided the Croatian lands (Note: In the context of the Habsburg Monarchy, the term Croatian lands normally refers to the kingdoms of Croatia-Slavonia and Dalmatia, as well as Istria, the city of Rijeka, and Međimurje. These areas largely corresponded to the so-called Triune Kingdom. Founders of the Party of Rights defined the Croatian lands in vague terms since the 1860s. Eugen Kvaternik described it as the area bounded by the Alps, the Danube and Drina rivers, and Albania. Ante Starčević spoke of an even wider area, extending beyond the Drina – to the Timok River. In 1918, Ivo Pilar formulated the view accepted by Croat nationalists in the interwar period, defining the Croatian lands as consisting of the Central Croatia, Slavonia, Dalmatia, Istria, and Bosnia and Herzegovina.) and other lands inhabited by significant Croat populations between Austrian- and Hungarian-ruled halves of the empire. Dalmatia and Istria were ruled by Vienna, while Croatia-Slavonia was a part of the Arch-Kingdom of Hungary. The Croatian–Hungarian Settlement upheld but also curbed Croatian political autonomy, restricting it to internal affairs. In Hungary, despite the guarantees of Croatian autonomy, the Settlement was viewed as a step towards full integration of Croatia into the Hungarian state, and the Hungarian government's policies threatened Croatian autonomy. As this position became better known, the Croats increasingly opposed the Settlement. The Party of Rights became among leading critics of the constitutional arrangement. The unicameral Sabor was authorised to legislate on matters within the scope of Croatia's autonomy. The Sabor was elected, but the electoral laws limited suffrage by means of property qualification to about 2% of the population. The Ban of Croatia was appointed by the Emperor in consultation with the Prime Minister of Hungary as the head of the executive. The appointment guaranteed Hungarian control over Croatia's autonomous affairs. The People's Party (Narodna stranka) allied itself with the government, while the Party of Rights and the Independent People's Party (Neodvisna narodna stranka, NNS) formed the opposition, relying on the minority middle class.

In the same period, the gradual infringement against Croatia's autonomy gave rise to Croatian resentment, leading to anti-Hungarian protests. In response, the Hungarian government imposed martial law in Croatia-Slavonia and shortly afterwards appointed Károly Khuen-Héderváry the Ban of Croatia. Seeking to weaken the opposition, Khuen-Héderváry applied the divide and rule policy by fostering conflict between Croats and Croatian Serbs through a series of concessions to the latter. In the process, the policy relied on Serbs' fear of the Croatian nationalism championed by the Party of Rights. (Note: Ante Starčević argued that states form "citizens' states" in which all citizens are equal and the definition of a nation does not rely on ethnic or religious criteria. Building on his idea that the existence of a state can create its associated nation devoid of ethnic and religious criteria, he claimed that there are no other peoples in Croatia other than Croats. This created a conflict between Croatian nationalism and Serbian nationalism, as the latter advocated popular sovereignty which would erase borders of previously existing polities with the aim of uniting all Serbs in a single state, including the Serbs of Croatia.) The Khuen-Héderváry's policy strengthened both anti-Serb Croatian and anti-Croat Serbian nationalisms.

== Establishment ==
=== Factions of the Party of Rights ===
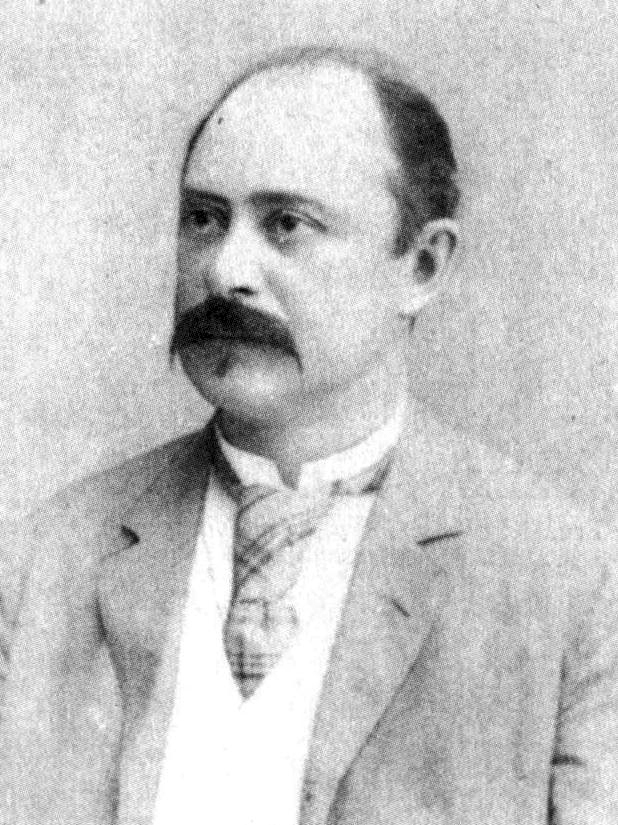
Josip Frank, the eponym and the founder of the party

In the late 1880s and early 1890s, factions began to form within the party centred on Fran Folnegović and Josip Frank. Some prominent party figures such as the head of the Club of the Party of Rights, Baron Juraj Rukavina Vidovgradski and party leader's nephew David Starčević, (Note: Historiography normally refers to brothers David and Mile Starčević as nephews of Ante Starčević and to Ante as their uncle. They were first cousins once removed; David and Ante's father, Jakov, were brothers. Regardless, David and Mile called Ante "uncle", and Ante called the brothers "nephews", and historiography generally accepted those labels.) criticised both Folnegović and Frank for their willingness to pursue political objectives through various compromises and departure from the struggle for an independent Croatian state. Specifically, both claimed that partial Croatian statehood within Austria-Hungary would be an acceptable political objective. In that respect, Folnegović's and Frank's positions differed from political views stated by Ante Starčević before the Rakovica revolt.

In the course of unsuccessful negotiations on the potential merger of the Party of Rights and the Independent People's Party, and the adoption of the two parties' common political programme in 1894, views held by Folnegović and Frank diverged considerably. Folnegović supported the idea of the merger and accepted some elements of Yugoslavism as political goals, recognising that Croat-Serb conflict was only beneficial to Hungarian encroachment in Croatia. Frank withheld approval of the merger unless the Party of Rights leadership were to dominate the new party. His faction of the Party of Rights intended to entice the House of Habsburg-Lorraine to reform the Empire into a state consisting of three constituent parts, (Note: The historiography refers to this concept as trialism in Austria-Hungary.) adding a Croatian part of the monarchy carved out of the existing Austrian and Hungarian ones. They rejected Yugoslavism for fear it might lead to the establishment of Greater Serbia at the expense of Croatian interests. In response, the faction championed the idea of national expansionism to achieve a Greater Croatia, pursuing a policy of Austro-Croatism. Frank thought Austria might favour Croatian interests because the Empire could no longer expand except in the Balkans. (Note: The eastward Austro-Hungarian expansion was interpreted as an element of a wider German expansionism and Drang nach Osten.) He thought such expansion would be at the expense of Serbia, and it would justify an anti-Serbian policy. At the same time, Frank viewed the Austro-Hungarian occupation of Bosnia and Herzegovina as enforcement of a claim to the region under the Croatian state right. (Note: A portion of Austrian aristocracy supported the idea of a reformed Empire where Dalmatia as well as Bosnia and Herzegovina would be added to Croatia-Slavonia to form a united Croatia with constitutional ties to Austria rather than Hungary. The idea, involving the return to the 1860 October Diploma constitution was rejected by Emperor Franz Joseph I. Regardless of the rejection, the Frankists hoped such an arrangement would be possible at a later date to protect against magyarisation or against establishment of the Greater Serbia or creation of a united South Slavic state dominated by the Serbs.)

The conflict between the Frank's and Folnegović factions was often mediated by Ante Trumbić as a prominent member of the Party of Rights Dalmatian chapter. Regardless of the mediation, the rivalry between Folnegović and Frank deepened as both saw themselves as a potential successor to Ante Starčević. While Folnegović had the support of most of the party's leading figures and was the longest-serving member of the Sabor in the party, Frank hoped to gain advantage through a closer relationship with Ante Starčević. In that respect, Frank became particularly engaged with the construction of the Starčevićev dom building in Zagreb, hoping to curry favour with the party founder.

=== Frankist split ===
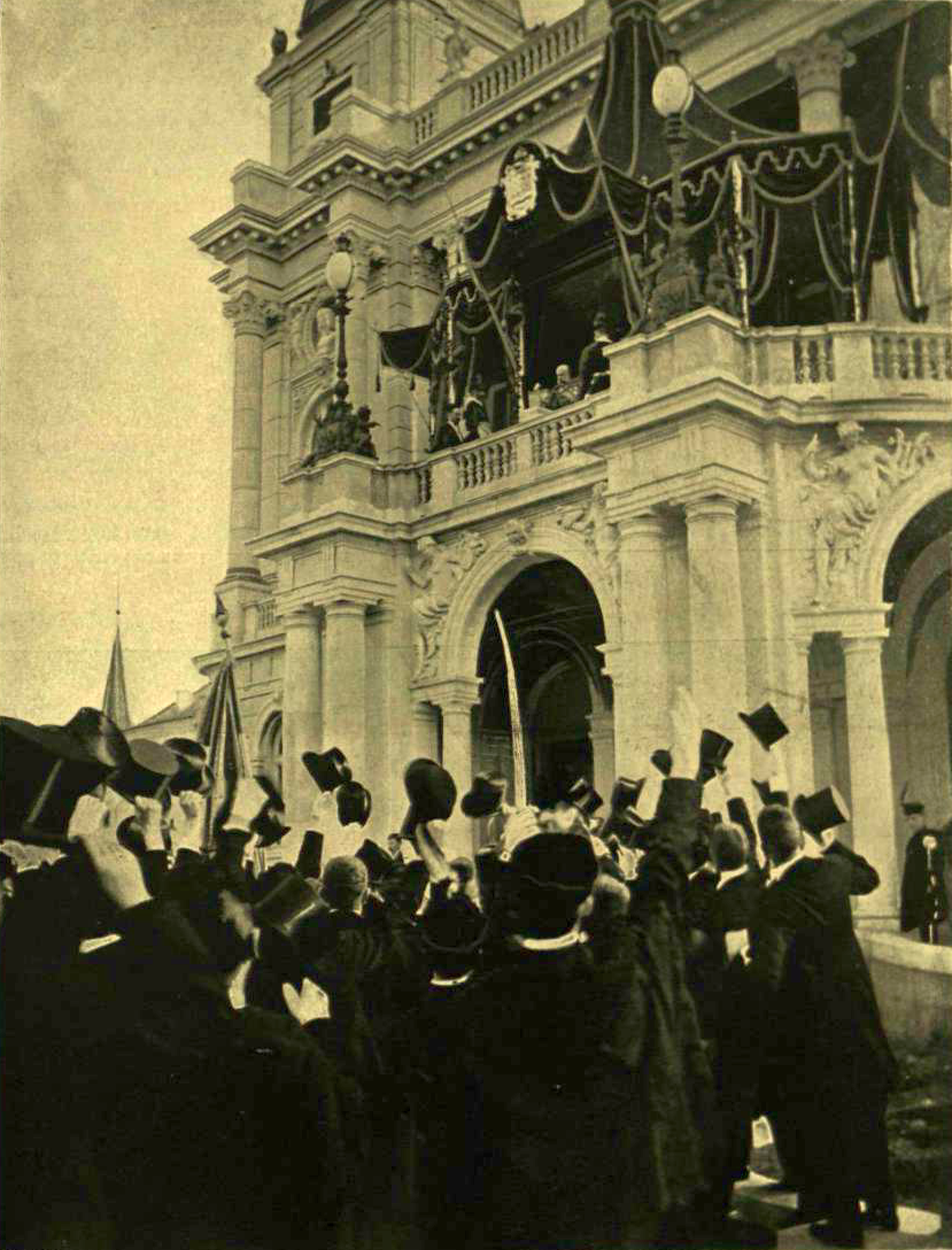
The Frankists split from the Party of Rights in the aftermath of the 1895 visit by Emperor Franz Joseph to Zagreb (pictured).

In 1895, the Party of Rights appointed the Central Committee as the governing body. Ante Starčević was its president, but due to his illness and absence from day-to-day work, Folnegović controlled the party as the elected vice-president. Furthermore, Folnegović ensured that his opponents Mile Starčević and Frank were left out or appointed to lower-tier positions in the committee. At the same time, Folnegović helped Trumbić and Frano Supilo, who supported his political views, to become full members of the committee. Frank remained the main opponent of Folnegović, accusing the Central Committee of being a device for betraying the Party of Rights. Ante Starčević supported Frank in levying the accusations against Folnegović. The same year, new leadership of the Club of the Party of Rights was also elected. Folnegović ran for president, with Grga Tuškan nominated as his vice-president. Even though Frank and his vice-presidential nominee Eugen Kumičić were supported by Ante Starčević, Folnegović and Tuškan won. The defeat left Frank embittered.

On 22 October 1895, the split in the Party of Rights among Folnegović's and Frank's supporters produced factions known as the Frankists (Frankovci) and the Homeland faction (Domovinaši), named after Frank and the party newspaper Hrvatska domovina (lit. 'Croatian Homeland'). The immediate cause for the split was Folnegović's speech in which he distanced the party from violence on the occasion of the 1895 visit by Emperor Franz Joseph to Zagreb. In particular, two people involved in the violence were Frank's sons Vladimir and Ivo. Folnegović resigned from the Central Committee and the Sabor, while Frank, supported by Ante Starčević, went on to form the Pure Party of Rights (Čista stranka prava, ČSP). Historiography often refers to the party as the Frankists, referencing Josip Frank as the group's and the party's initial leader.

== Activities ==
=== Early years ===
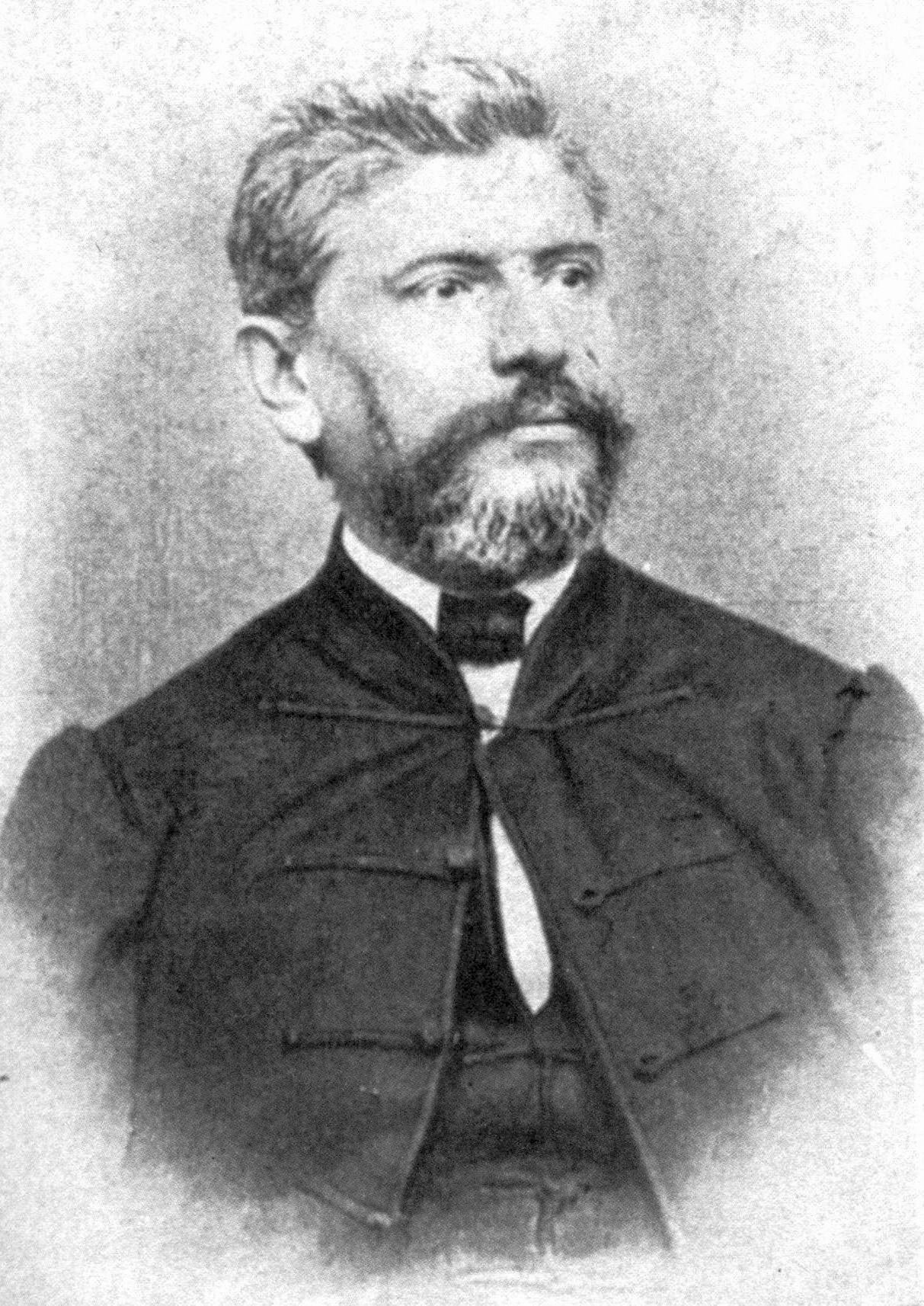
Founder of the Party of Rights, Ante Starčević, sided with Josip Frank in the 1895 split.

Upon its establishment, the Frankists had four seats in the Sabor, held by Josip Frank, Ante Starčević, Mile Starčević, and Kumičić. Terminally ill Ante Starčević left the leadership of the party to the remaining three. The Frankists explained the name as a reference to the only part of "pure Croatian idea", and adopted a party programme advocating a reformed Austro-Hungarian framework in which an autonomous unified Croatian state would exist, enjoying equality with Hungary in terms of relations to the central government in Vienna. The Frankists declared they would cooperate in the Sabor with others to renegotiate the Croatian–Hungarian Settlement. Furthermore, they recognised Serbs as a separate South Slavic people, provided they lived in Serbia. The Frankists claimed that the Serbs living west of the Drina River were actually serbianised Vlachs and referred to them as Orthodox Croats due to their Orthodox Christian religion. In view of the Frankists, the Serbs living in Croatia were to become "political Croats". In February 1896, the Domovinaši unsuccessfully attempted to reverse the split. Following the 1897 Sabor election, Josip Frank and Mile Starčević remained the only Frankists in the Sabor.

Even though the Dalmatian Party of Rights initially condemned the 1895 split and claimed to support neither the Domovinaši nor the Frankists, a Frankist faction of the Party of Rights organised in Dalmatia split from the mainstream, also establishing a separate Pure Party of Rights in Dalmatia led by supporters of Ivo Prodan in 1898. The new party elected Petar Baturić its president. (Note: The Dalmatian Pure Party of Rights justified the split claiming the mainstream had adopted social democracy and excessive liberalism. The party adopted anti-Serbian and anti-Italian views, particularly in opposition to the Autonomist Party. Unlike Josip Frank, Petar Baturić maintained cooperation with the party he had previously split from. After the 1901 Dalmatian parliamentary election, the two parties maintained a joint club of representatives, with the Dalmatian Party of Rights having eight members and the Dalmatian Pure Party of Rights three.) In line with their view of religion as irrelevant in nation-building, the Frankists publicly criticised the First Croatian Catholic Congress held in September 1900. Specifically, they protested against the claim that Croats are necessarily Roman Catholic and argued they may also be Christian Orthodox, Islamic, or Jewish. The Frankists initially criticised the Christian Social Party of Karl Lueger as agents of Austrian Catholic expansionism threatening Croatian interests.

In the campaign ahead of the 1901 parliamentary election, the Frankists used a prominent display of the Croatian flag and regular singing of the national anthem and patriotic songs to solidify the party's reputation as the most nationalist political option. Regardless, the party won only two seats in the Sabor. Following the electoral defeat of the Frankists and other opposition parties, Croat-Serb relations deteriorated. The low point was reached after the Serb Independent Party organ Srbobran published an article by Nikola Stojanović in which he argued that Croats are not a nation due to a lack of their own language and other nation-building properties, and that Croats are in the process of becoming Serbs. The conflict escalated into riots targeting Serb businesses and homes in Zagreb in September 1902. The Frankists, who thought of the Serbs as enemies of the Croatian nation, led the riots that were only incited further by the police. (Note: The 1902 riots resulted in 100 arrests, a ban of the Srbobran, and a change of the Serb Independent Party leadership, where Svetozar Pribićević took over control, thus setting the stage for the New Course Policy and creation of the Croat-Serb Coalition.)

=== Seeking allies in Austria ===
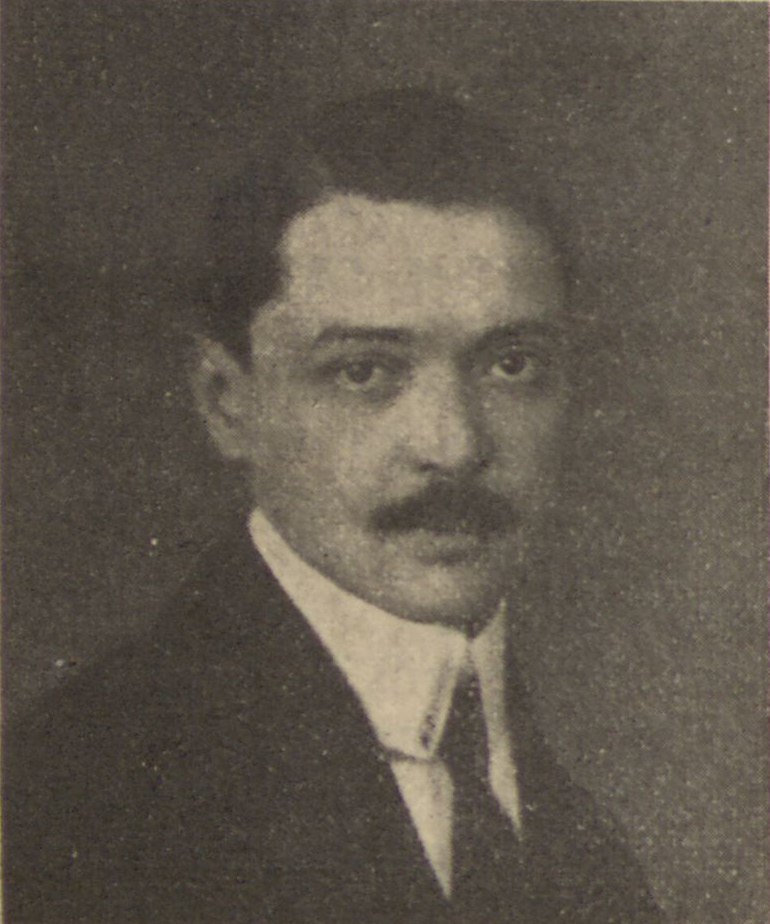
Josip Frank's son Ivo (depicted) was a part of the Frankist delegation to Charles I of Austria to discuss reforms in 1918.

In 1902, Starčević Youth (Starčevićanska mladež) was established at the University of Zagreb to recruit Frankist supporters. The organisation also criticised the Frankists for what it saw as an insufficiently sharp stance against clericals and Hungarians. By 1908, it expanded to 18 secondary schools and started publication of Mlada Hrvatska (lit. 'Young Croatia') newspaper. Subsequently, the organisation was commonly referred to in historiography as Young Croatia or Young Croat Movement (Mladohrvatski pokret) after the publication. In 1902, the Domovinaši and the NNS merged (Note: The Domovinaši (i.e. the mainstream of the Party of Rights) and the Independent People's Party merged into the party initially named the United Opposition, and soon renamed the Croatian Party of Rights.) and offered the Frankists to join, but the merger never materialised. The Frankists won two additional Sabor seats in by-elections of 1903 filled by Kumičić and Juraj Tomac. The party changed its name to Starčević Croatian Party of Rights (Starčevića hrvatska stranka prava) in 1904. That year Stjepan Radić founded the Croatian Peasant Party (Hrvatska selljačka stranka, HSS). (Note: The Croatian Peasant Party (HSS) was named the Croatian People's Peasant Party (HPSS) until late 1920, when its name was changed to the Croatian Republican Peasant Party. The party dropped the word "Republican" from its name in 1925.) The Frankists held an unfavourable view of the HSS as incompatible with their views and policies. On the other hand, Radić rebuked the Frankist policies as irreligious and alien to peasants, accusing Josip Frank of being insincere about the motivation for his conversion to Catholicism.

In 1906, a competing Croatian Christian-Social Party of Rights (Hrvatska kršćansko-socijalna stranka prava, HKSSP) was established by a group associated with the Hrvatstvo (lit. 'Croatdom') newspaper. That party, whose members are also commonly referred to as the Frankists by the historiography, adopted the 1894 Party of Rights programme as its own. The HKSSP also declared its objective of creating a Greater Croatia within the Habsburg monarchy. While the so-called Greater Austrian Circle of Archduke Franz Ferdinand of Austria, (Note: The Greater Austrian Circle achieved influence through appointments of its members: Alois Lexa von Aehrenthal was the Austro-Hungarian foreign minister, Feldmarschall Franz Conrad von Hötzendorf became the chief of the general staff, and Franz Xaver von Schönaich and Moritz von Auffenberg were the ministers of war. Josip Frank established personal contacts with von Auffenberg.) Including Lueger's Christian Socialists, welcomed the event; Josip Frank was reserved toward the new party. His attitude changed when he realised the Greater Austrian Circle could be an ally against the Hungarians. The group wanted to reform the Empire on a Catholic and centralist platform, but contrary to Frank's impression, never intended to achieve a federation of sovereign states and wanted three administrative units – Austrian, Hungarian and Croatian or Romanian. In the run-up to the 1906 parliamentary election, priests started supporting the Frankists due to their proximity to the HKSSP and shared opposition to the Rijeka Resolution on Croat-Serb cooperation. In that election, the Frankists list of candidates won 20 out of 88 seats in the Sabor. The results improved by four seats in the 1908 parliamentary election.

=== Break with Milinovci ===
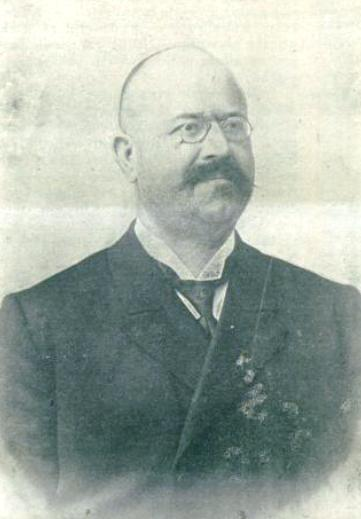
Mile Starčević led a faction that split from the Frankists in 1908.

The elections of 1906 and 1908 introduced and confirmed a change of ruling party in Croatia-Slavonia as the People's Party was replaced by the Croat-Serb Coalition (Hrvatsko-srpska koalicija, HSK) established by Supilo and Svetozar Pribićević from the Dalmatian Party of Rights and the Independent Serb Party. The Croat-Serb cooperation advocated by the HSK was rejected by the Frankists. Increasingly close relations between the Frankists and the Greater Austrian Circle allowed the latter to use the Frankists to suppress political opponents in the Bosnian Crisis. For that purpose, the Frankists launched an anti-Serbian Campaign in Croatia, branding the HSK a proponent of Greater Serbia. Frank believed Serbian expansionism was more dangerous than Austrian or Hungarian because of the similarity of the Croatian and Serbian languages. The Frankists started organising the Croatian Legion as a party's armed wing. The force, raised with tacit approval of the Chief of the Austro-Hungarian General Staff, Franz Conrad von Hötzendorf, was ostensibly readied for a war with Serbia, but in reality it served for clashes with political opponents. Alignment with the Austrian interests caused a split in the party. In 1908, a faction led by Mile Starčević and Ante Pavelić (elder) established a splinter party known as the Milinovci. (Note: Formally the Milinovci were called the Starčević's Party of Rights (Starčevićeva stranka prava), but the historiography refers to the party as the Milinovci, eponymously after the first name of its founder.) The Milinovci opened the door to cooperation with the HSK and announced a return to the Party of Rights programme pursued before the Frankist split.

In 1910, the Frankists merged with the HKSSP and the resulting party was named the Party of Rights. At the same time, Aleksandar Horvat replaced ailing Josip Frank as the party president. The merger with the HKSSP alienated the Young Croatia from the Frankists, and the youth organisation became ideologically closer to the Progressive Youth. Specifically, the Young Croatia members argued that Ante Starčević's claim that all South Slavs are Croats and the unitarist Yugoslavist claim that all South Slavs belong to a single nation of Yugoslavs are essentially the same except for the name applied to the nation in question – and chose the latter. Young Croatia, once under patronage of the Frankists, became detached from them in 1910. Following the 1910 parliamentary election, the Frankists' representation in the Sabor was reduced to 15. The Frankists and the Milinovci reconciled and formed a single party named the Party of Rights. (Note: In 1910, the Party of Rights mainstream (also known as Domovinaši), from which the Frankists had split in 1895, merged with the Croatian Progressive Party to form the Croatian United Independent Party, abandoning the name of the Party of Rights.) The party, led by Mile Starčević as the president and Horvat as his deputy, ran in the 1911 parliamentary election, winning 27 seats out of 84. The unification was undertaken with the intention of engaging the HSK as a potential ally against Hungarian overreach while enlisting the help of the Greater Austrian Circle. The party addressed its 1912 Memorandum to the Emperor, unsuccessfully protesting against encroachment on Croatian rights. Cooperation with the HSK ended in 1913 when the coalition reached an agreement with the Hungarian government of István Tisza, and the Frankist and Milinovci factions of the Party of Rights split once more. After the breakup, the Frankists continued to advocate a reform of Austria-Hungary as a federation, while the Milinovci accepted Yugoslavism and supported unification of the South Slavs outside the Habsburg monarchy, believing that the Frankist ideas were unfeasible. In the 1913 parliamentary election, the Frankists won nine seats in the 88-member Sabor. Following the breakdown of cooperation with the Milinovci and the HSK, the Frankists formed an alliance with Radić's HSS against the HSK, criticising the HSK for working to maintain Croatia in a subordinate position within the Empire.

=== End of Austria-Hungary ===
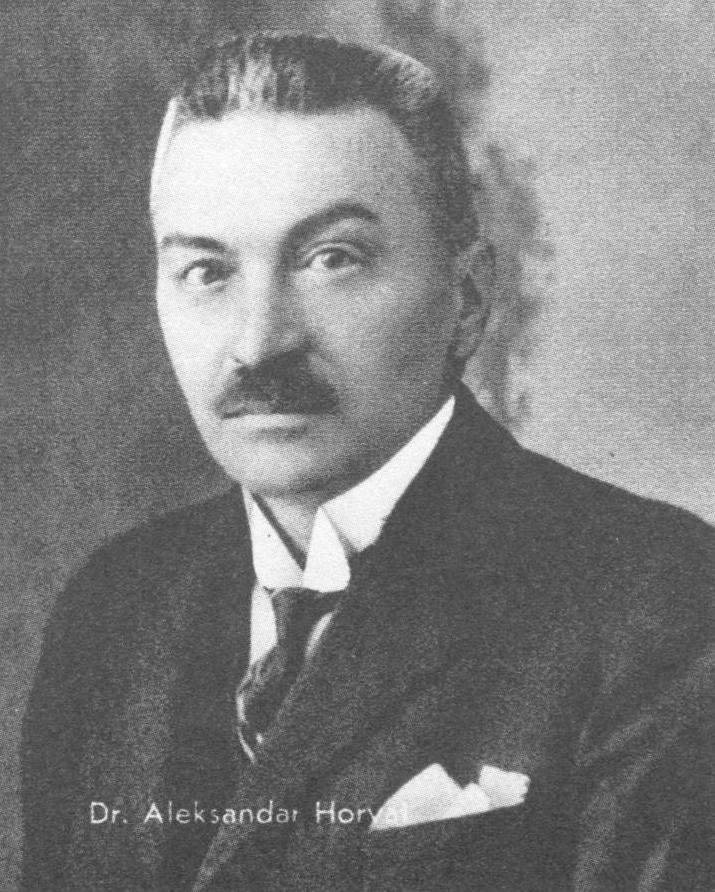
Aleksandar Horvat took over the role of the leader of the Frankists from Josip Frank in 1910.

The Frankists, who were in decline since 1911, were reinvigorated by the Assassination of Archduke Franz Ferdinand in 1914 and the subsequent outbreak of the First World War. Hoping for postwar rewards, the Frankists supported Austria-Hungary by organising anti-Serbian protests in Croatia. They offered support to both Austria and Hungary as a barrier against potential treason in Croatia. The Frankists designated the HSK traitors and partially to blame for the assassination. They offered the Tisza government their services and hoped to introduce military rule in Croatia that might allow unification of the Croatian lands. This expectation was based on personal relations between Ivo Frank and Horvat on one side and a range of Austro-Hungarian officers on the other. To achieve this, the Frankists secretly urged Tisza to disband the HSK-dominated Sabor. In late October 1918, Horvat, accompanied by Ivo Frank and Josip Pazman, met Emperor Charles I of Austria and the new Hungarian prime minister Sándor Wekerle to obtain their support for an independent and unified Croatia within the Empire. Besides the HSK, the Frankists were also attacking the Milinovci, claiming that their acceptance of Yugoslavism was helping the establishment of a Greater Serbia. The HSS broke their alliance with the Frankists in April 1918, no longer wishing to antagonise the Serbs of Croatia.

On 5–6 October 1918, as the idea of creation of Yugoslavia as a common state of South Slavs gained momentum in the course of dissolution of Austria-Hungary, political parties representing Croats, Serbs, and Slovenes living in Austria-Hungary established the National Council of Slovenes, Croats and Serbs as a representative body seeking independence from the Empire. The council was led by Slovene People's Party leader Anton Korošec, Pribićević, and Pavelić (elder). The Frankists disagreed with the majority of the National Council, but wanted to join regardless. On 19 October, the National Council's negotiators required the Frankists to commit to support unification with Serbia as well as to expel Horvat, Ivo Frank and Vladimir Sachs before the request would be considered. The Frankists accepted the terms, informing the council that party president Horvat had retired from politics, that the party expected Ivo Frank to do the same once he returned from abroad, and that Sachs was not a member. Leadership of the Frankists was succeeded by Vladimir Prebeg. Regardless of acceptance of the ultimatum, the National Council declined the Frankists' request to join on 28 October. The next day, the Sabor adopted the National Council proposal to end Croatia's constitutional ties with Austria and Hungary. In response, Prebeg proclaimed support for the National Council, declared the Frankist goal of Croatian independence fulfilled, and announced that the Frankists would disband as a party since they had achieved their objective.

=== Creation of Yugoslavia ===
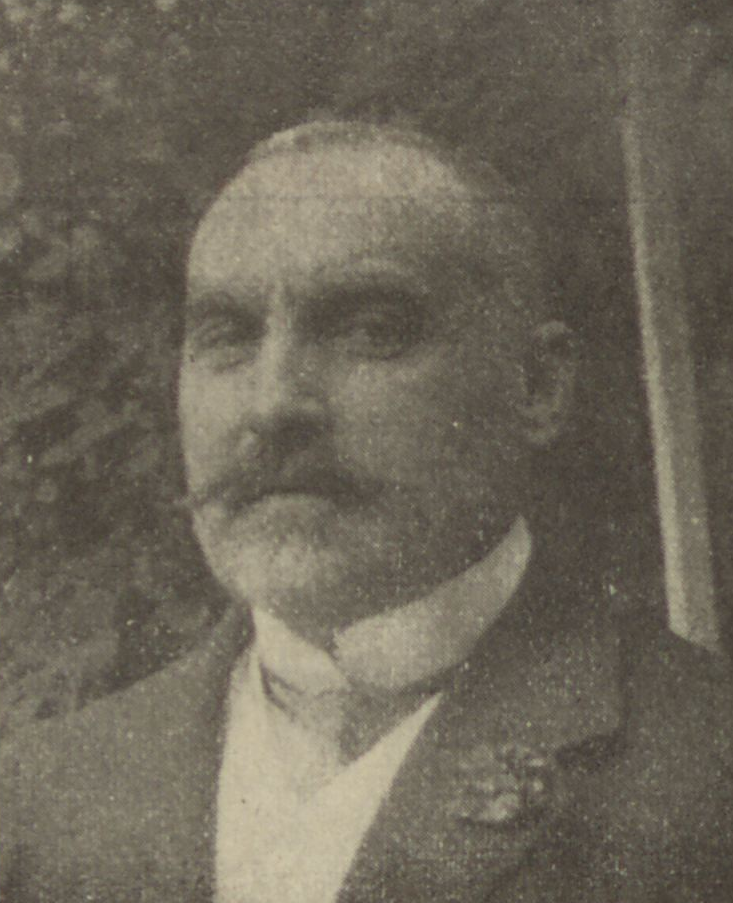
Vladimir Prebeg led the Frankists after Aleksandar Horvat's retirement from politics.

Regardless of Prebeg's announcement, the Frankist party leadership decided not to disband. The decision was justified by changing circumstances – Italian occupation of the Adriatic coast blocking unification of the Croatian lands, and overstepping of authority delegated by the Sabor to the National Council. The Frankists argued that a delegation dispatched by the National Council to Serbia – where they were received by Regent Alexander in a conference that ended in the proclamation of the Kingdom of Serbs, Croats and Slovenes (later renamed Yugoslavia) on 1 December 1918 – was illegitimate because it exceeded its authority. This argument was presented, along with a call for a unified Croatian republic in alliance with Slovenes and Serbs in the Frankist manifesto of 2 December. The manifesto was printed on leaflets distributed in Zagreb, and suppressed by the police on 3 December. Frankist leaders and activists Prebeg, Pazman, Milan Kovačević, General Ante Matasić, and Mirko Puk were arrested, and party organ Hrvatska was banned. On 5 December 1918, a group of soldiers from Croatian-staffed former Royal Croatian Home Guard and the former Austro-Hungarian Common Army units mutinied and clashed with forces raised by the National Council in Zagreb. The Frankists pointed out the protest as evidence of Croat refusal to form Yugoslavia and portrayed the revolt as vindication of Frankists' opposition to creation of Yugoslavia. Attempting to capitalise on the perceived sentiment, the Frankists emphasised that they were championing the same cause as the victims of the protest.

Despite opposition to the creation of Yugoslavia, the Frankists continued to function as a political party. The Temporary National Representation was created in Yugoslavia in February 1919 as an interim parliament. Its members representing Croatia-Slavonia were formally appointed by the National Council, and in reality by the Regent Alexander. None of the Frankists were included. In March, the Frankists changed the name of the party once again, to the Croatian Party of Rights (Hrvatska stranka prava) and promulgated a new party programme. The new programme called for legal struggle for independent Croatia, with borders expanded to those of a Greater Croatia comprising not only the territories of Croatia-Slavonia and Dalmatia, but also Bosnia and Herzegovina, Rijeka, Međimurje, Prekmurje, Istria and potentially Slovenia – in alliance with Serbia, Montenegro, and Bulgaria. The Frankists continued to rely on nationalist intellectuals and former Austro-Hungarian officers, but lacked support in the countryside, which had just become the dominant part of the voting population due to the introduction of the universal manhood suffrage. Another pool of party support was among the petite bourgeoisie, earning the Frankist policy the nickname of the "policy of the Vlaška Street" named after the Zagreb street where many small business owners and shopkeepers lived and worked. Following the adoption of the new programme, the Frankists sent a letter to the Paris Peace Conference protesting against the method of creating Yugoslavia. In response, Prebeg and Pazman were arrested again on Pribićević's orders in his new role as the interior minister.

Many Frankists feared retribution by Pribićević for their anti-Serbian stance and went into exile. In May 1919, they formed the nationalist Croatian Committee in Austria, joined by a number of former Austro-Hungarian military personnel. The organisation was led by Ivo Frank. Its objective was independence of Croatia. The organisation intended to gather support in Croatia by spreading and amplifying anti-Serb sentiment, relying on discontent with the conditions of creating Yugoslavia.

=== Part of the Croatian Bloc ===
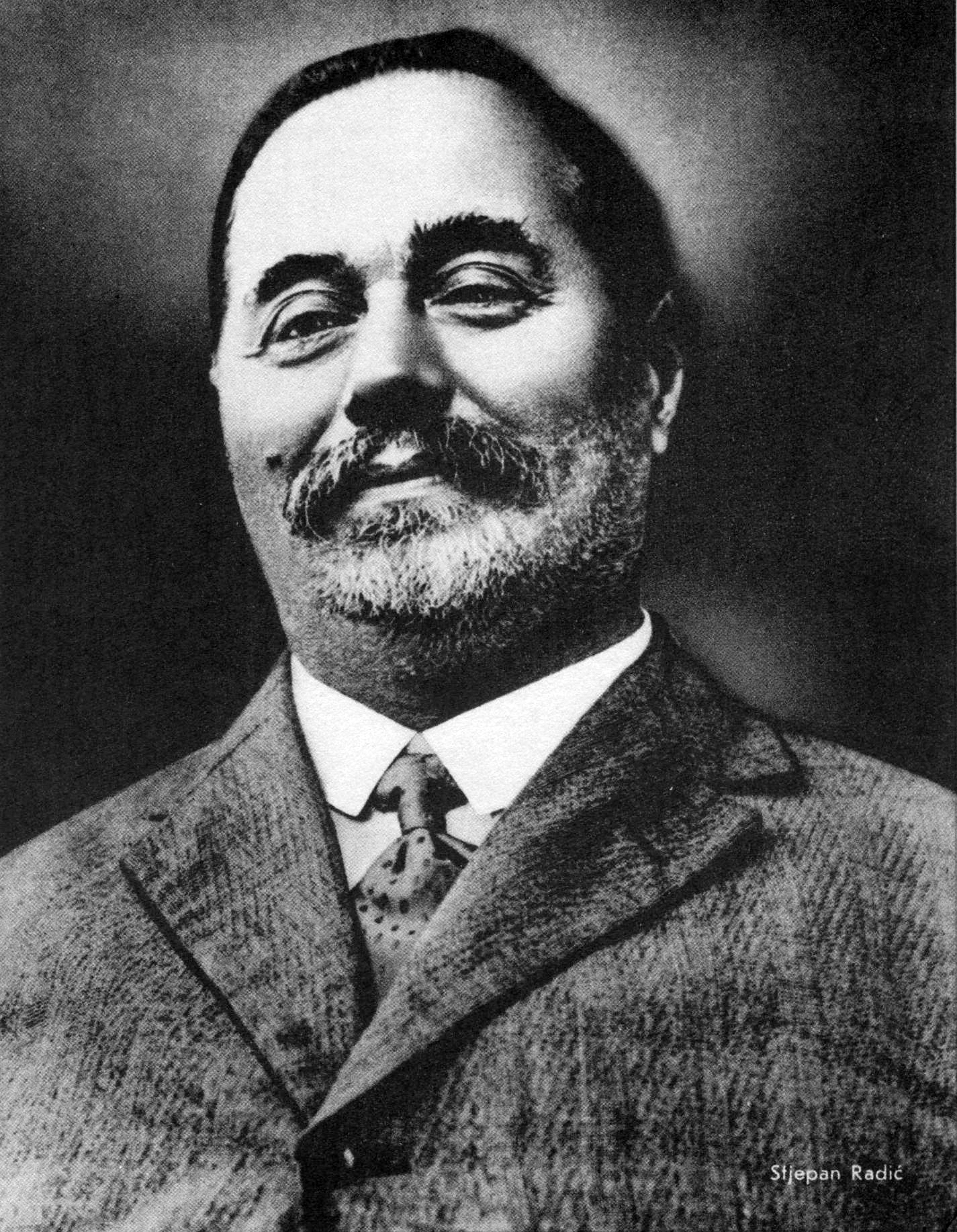
In 1920, Stjepan Radić dominated the Croatian Bloc coalition which initially included the Frankists.

The Frankists spent most of the 1920s at the margins of political life in Yugoslavia. The party ran in the 1920 Constitutional Assembly election where the only two elected Frankist candidates were Mirko Košutić and Krunoslav Lokmer in the 419-strong assembly. The election established the HSS as the leading political party in Croatia-Slavonia. It outperformed the previously leading Croatian Union and the Frankists combined by about 45 percentage points. However, the HSS abstained from the Constitutional Assembly because it advocated a republic rather than a monarchy and would not swear an oath of allegiance to the king. The Frankists quickly followed the HSS's example, while the Croatian Union joined the abstentionists five months later, protesting against the decision-making by a simple majority. The three parties formed the HSS-dominated Croatian Bloc coalition and drew up a declaration denying the rump assembly legitimacy or the right to enact a constitution binding for Croats or Croatia. The coalition helped establish the Croatian National Youth (HANAO) ostensibly to protect Croats against government-sponsored violence and against violent actions of the Organization of Yugoslav Nationalists. The HANAO, itself resorting to violence and terrorism, became increasingly radical as its political positions gradually shifted to those of the Frankists. The Croatian Bloc negotiated, on HSS initiative, with the Serb-dominated Democratic Party with the aim of bringing down the existing government and revising Yugoslavia's first constitution. The Frankists pulled out of the talks in late 1922, choosing to cooperate with the Democratic Party's rival, the Serb-dominated, ruling People's Radical Party (NRS) instead. In response, Radić ejected the Frankists from the coalition. The HSS also withheld political and financial support from the HANAO, and the organisation came under Frankist control.

In the aftermath of the pullout from the Croatian Bloc, a faction led by Košutić and Matej Mintas formed a splinter party. (Note: The Košutić-Mintas faction established a new party also named the Croatian Party of Rights in 1925. That same year, the party split into two factions: one led by Košutić and the other by Mintas. Košutić's faction became the Croatian People's Starčević Party, which ceased to exist in 1926. That year, Mintas was replaced by Milan Šafar at the helm of the faction that became the Croatian Starčević Party, which ceased to exist in 1928.) The NRS maintained contacts with the Frankists after they left the Croatian Bloc, financially supporting them. The NRS proposed to transform the Frankists into the Croatian Radical Party, as a Croatian wing of the NRS. Numerous contacts and promises of concessions to the Frankists for their alliance or joining the NRS were widely reported by the contemporary press. The cooperation was aimed at weakening the position of the HSS. The parties discussed "amputation" of Croatia, entailing removal of Central Croatia and Slovenia from Yugoslavia, leaving Slavonia and Dalmatia within the country and presumably solving the Croatian question. Finally, the aim of the cooperation with the NRS was to install the Frankists as the rulers of the rump Croatia. In March 1925, HSS recognised the Yugoslav constitution as legitimate, and the NRS stopped supporting the Frankists. According to historian Ivo Banac, the strategy employed by the Frankists made them a greater liability for Croatian national interests than a threat to unitarist forces in Yugoslavia. In the 1923 and 1925 parliamentary elections, the Frankists did not clear the electoral threshold.

=== Rise of Ante Pavelić ===
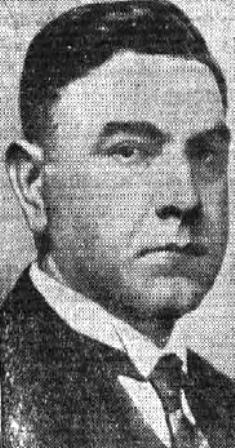
Ante Pavelić became recognised as a defence lawyer of prominent Frankists.

In 1921, prominent Frankists Milan Šufflay and Ivo Pilar were arrested and tried over connections with the Croatian Committee. Their defence lawyer Ante Pavelić rose through the Frankist hierarchy due to the prominence he gained defending Šufflay and Pilar. Following the HSP's failure to win any seats in the 1925 elections, Pavelić became the party's most active politician. In 1926, the Frankists established the Croatian Rightist Republican Youth (Hrvatska pravaška republikanska omladina) organisation, which provided organisational support to Pavelić. The 1928 congress of the youth organisation called for the establishment of a terrorist organisation whose aim would be to achieve Croatian independence, and Hrvatski domobran was established in response. Both cooperated in organising the 1 December 1928 protest in Zagreb, which ended in a clash with the police.

Pavelić went on to win a parliamentary seat in the 1927 parliamentary election, the sole mandate won by the Frankists in that poll. The Frankists took part in that election within the framework of a new coalition, also named the Croatian Bloc, whose objective was to challenge the dominance of the HSS in Croatia. The new coalition was an alliance with the Trumbić-led Croatian Federalist Peasant Party. Gaining further prominence through parliamentary work, Pavelić became the vice-president of the party by 1927. In that role, he and Ivo Frank co-wrote a letter to Italian leader Benito Mussolini, asking for Italian backing. In return, they promised political, economic and military alignment of Croatia with Italian interests, including a revision of the Italian–Yugoslav border treaty. Specifically, they promised to cede to Italy the Bay of Kotor and parts of Dalmatia that were of strategic importance to Italy. The letter was written when the two met in Budapest in 1927. Ivo Frank handed his copy to the Italian ambassador to Hungary, while Pavelić took a copy later that year to Rome and passed it through Roberto Forges Davanzati.

Following the 1928 assassination of Stjepan Radić, Pavelić called for unity of the Croatian opposition, and he and Trumbić allied with the HSS in the national assembly, briefly advocating a merger of the Frankists and the HSS. According to historian Fikreta Jelić-Butić, he calculated those moves to increase his own political influence. In early 1929, upon introduction of the royal dictatorship, political parties were banned in Yugoslavia.

== Aftermath and legacy ==
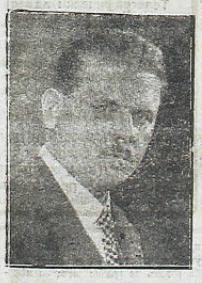
Gustav Perčec accompanied Ante Pavelić to Bulgaria to seek cooperation with the IMRO.

In 1929, Pavelić went into exile. That year he met with the so-called Sarkotić Group in Austria, (Note: Generaloberst Stjepan Sarkotić and lieutenant colonels Stephan Duić and Ivan Perčević von Odavna formed the core of an informal Sarkotić Group of the Croatian Committee. The Sarkotić Group continued to meet in the 1920s, after the committee became defunct, to pursue politics, maintaining communication with Ante Pavelić and Stjepan Radić.) a remnant of the by that time already defunct Croatian Committee. Then he proceeded to Bulgaria, accompanied by another Frankist Gustav Perčec, where the two agreed on cooperation with the leaders of the Internal Macedonian Revolutionary Organisation. In response, Yugoslav authorities charged and sentenced the two in absentia to death. Pavelić moved to Italy, where he established the Ustaše ultranationalist organisation. Even though the Ustaše movement programme published in 1933 does not refer to Ante Starčević, the Ustaše would claim the Frankist heritage. In the founding of the Ustaše organisation, Pavelić relied on former Frankists such as Perčec and Mile Budak, and Frankist youth members such as Branimir Jelić and Eugen Dido Kvaternik.

To establish the Ustaše movement, Pavelić relied on the so-called culture of defeat, a concept developed by the Frankists and former Austro-Hungarian military officers shortly after the creation of Yugoslavia. It entailed emphasising the moral superiority of wartime sacrifice as a prerequisite for a future redemption of the First World War defeat. The proponents of this concept argued a revisionist notion that the Croats had more in common with the defeated Central Powers. Special attention was given to reverence for and ritual gatherings on 29 October, 1 December, 5 December, and 1 November, representing events of 1918 – the day of Sabor's declaration of independence, creation of Yugoslavia, and the Zagreb protest; and the All Saints' Day.

Budak became the leading representative of the Frankists remaining in Yugoslavia after the political parties were banned. In that role, he co-signed the Zagreb Points resolution calling for political reforms in the country in 1932. Since the 1930s, Croatian nationalists normally claimed to be the followers of Ante Starčević without necessarily having had any formal ties with the banned Frankist party. Following the 1941 invasion of Yugoslavia in World War II, the nazi puppet of the Independent State of Croatia was established under dictatorial rule by Pavelić and the Ustaše. Pavelić then claimed to continue the work of Ante Starčević alone.

The modern Croatian Party of Rights was established in 1990, in the run-up to the Croatia's first free elections, following the post-World War II communist rule. The organisers announced the event as the "renewal of the Croatian Party of Rights." The modern party claimed to be a continuation of the Frankist party banned in 1929, as well as a continuation of the Party of Rights established in 1861.

== Election results ==
Election	In coalition with	Seats won	Change	Government
Election	In coalition with	(excluding coalition partners)		Government
1897	None	2 / 88	▼2*	Opposition
1901	None	2 / 88	0	Opposition
1903 by-election	None	4 / 88	▲2	Opposition
1906	None	20 / 88	▲16	Opposition
1908	None	24 / 88	▲4	Opposition
1910	None	15 / 88	▼9	Opposition
1911	united with Milinovci	27 / 84	▲12	Opposition
1913	None	9 / 88	▼18	Opposition
1920	None	2 / 419	New**	Opposition
1923	None	0 / 312	▼2	Opposition
1925	None	0 / 315	0	Opposition
1927	Croatian Bloc (with the HFSS)	1 / 315	▲1	Opposition
*Four members of the Croatian Sabor were inherited after the Party of Rights split in 1895. **National Assembly established after creation of Yugoslavia; Data sources: 1897, 1901–1903, 1906–1913, 1920–1927

== Sources ==
- Banac, Ivo (1984). The National Question in Yugoslavia: Origins, History, Politics. Ithaca: Cornell University Press. ISBN 978-0-8014-1675-0.
- Bartulin, Nevenko (2012). "From Independence to Trialism: The Croatian Party of Right and the Project for a Liberal "Greater Croatia" within the Habsburg Empire, 1861–1914". In Fitzpatrick, Matthew P. (ed.). Liberal Imperialism in Europe. London: Palgrave Macmillan. pp. 115–140. ISBN 978-1-349-43739-9.
- Bellamy, Alex J. (2003). The Formation of Croatian National Identity: A Centuries-old Dream. Manchester: Manchester University Press. ISBN 9780719065026.
- Biondich, Mark (2000). Stjepan Radić, the Croat Peasant Party, and the Politics of Mass Mobilization, 1904-1928. Toronto: University of Toronto Press. ISBN 0-8020-4727-0.
- Djilas, Aleksa (1991). The Contested Country: Yugoslav Unity and Communist Revolution, 1919-1953. Cambridge: Harvard University Press. ISBN 9780674166981.
- Duančić, Vedran (2020). Geography and Nationalist Visions of Interwar Yugoslavia. London: Palgrave Macmillan. ISBN 9783030502584.
- Fuerst-Bjeliš, Borna; Glamuzina, Nikola (2021). The Historical Geography of Croatia; Territorial Change and Cultural Landscapes. Cham: Springer. ISBN 978-3-030-68432-7.
- Gabelica, Mislav (2005). "Žrtve sukoba na Jelačićevom trgu 5. prosinca 1918" [Victims of the Clash on Jelačić Square on December 5, 1918]. Časopis za suvremenu povijest (in Croatian). 37 (2). Zagreb: Croatian Institute of History: 467–477. ISSN 0590-9597.
- Gabelica, Mislav (2016). "Mladohrvatski pokret do odvajanja od Starčevićeve hrvatske stranke prava 1910. godine" [The Young Croat Movement until its Separation from Starčvić's Party of Rights in 1910]. Zbornik Odsjeka za povijesne znanosti Zavoda za povijesne i društvene znanosti Hrvatske akademije znanosti i umjetnosti (in Croatian). 34. Zagreb: Croatian Academy of Sciences and Arts: 213–238. doi:10.21857/ypn4oc6r89. ISSN 1330-7134.
- Gabelica, Mislav (2022). "Društvo odlikovanih ratnika Hrvata 1914-1918. Prilog istraživanju odnosa Nezavisne Države Hrvatske prema Prvom svjetskom ratu" [Society of Decorated Croat Warriors 1914-1918. An addition to the research on the attitude of the Independent State of Croatia to the First World War]. Historijski zbornik (in Croatian). 75 (2). Zagreb: Društvo za hrvatsku povjesnicu: 241–262. ISSN 0351-2193.
- Glenny, Misha (2012). The Balkans, 1804–2012: Nationalism, War and the Great Powers. Toronto: House of Anansi Press. ISBN 978-1-77089-273-6.
- Gross, Mirjana (1998). "Folnegović, Fran". Croatian Biographical Lexicon (in Croatian). Miroslav Krleža Institute of Lexicography.
- Headlam, James Wycliffe (1911). "Austria-Hungary" . In Chisholm, Hugh (ed.). Encyclopædia Britannica. Vol. 3 (11th ed.). Cambridge University Press. pp. 2–39.
- Jelić-Butić, Fikreta (1977). Ustaše i Nezavisna država Hrvatska 1941–1945 [Ustaše and the Independent State of Croatia 1941–1945] (in Croatian). Zagreb: Sveučilišna naklada Liber. OCLC 462159614.
- Kallis, Aristotle (2008). Genocide and Fascism: The Eliminationist Drive in Fascist Europe. Milton Park: Routledge. ISBN 978-0-415-33960-5.
- Karaula, Željko (2008). "Hrvatska nacionalna omladina – (HANAO): prilog proučavanju djelovanja i rada hrvatskih omladinskih organizacija u Kraljevini SHS" [Croatian National Youth (HANAO). Activities of Croatian Youth Associations in the Kingdom of Serbs, Croats and Slovenes]. Historijski zbornik (in Croatian). 61 (2). Zagreb: Društvo za hrvatsku povjesnicu: 289–322. ISSN 0351-2193.
- Kristo, Jure G. (2004). Hrvatski katolički pokret [Croatian Catholic Movement] (in Croatian). Zagreb: Glas Koncila. ISBN 9789536258642.
- Matijević, Zlatko (2008a). "Stranka prava (frankovci) u doba vladavine Narodnoga vijeća Slovenaca, Hrvata i Srba (listopad – prosinac 1918.)" [The Party of Right (Frankists) During the Rule of the National Council of the Slovenes, Croats, and Serbs (October – December 1918)]. Časopis za suvremenu povijest (in Croatian). 40 (3). Zagreb: Croatian Institute of History: 1105–1118. ISSN 0590-9597.
- Matijević, Zlatko (2008b). "The National Council of Slovenes, Croats and Serbs in Zagreb (1918/1919)". Review of Croatian History. 4 (1). Zagreb: Hrvatski institut za povijest: 51–84. ISSN 1845-4380.
- Matković, Hrvoje (1962). "Veze između frankovaca i radikala od 1922–1925" [Links between the Frankists and the Radicals, 1922–1925]. Historijski zbornik (in Croatian). 15 (1–4). Zagreb: Društvo za hrvatsku povjesnicu: 41–59. ISSN 0351-2193.
- Matković, Hrvoje (2000). "Stjepan Radić i Hrvatski blok" [Stjepan Radić and the Croatian Block]. Radovi Zavoda za hrvatsku povijest Filozofskoga fakulteta Sveučilišta u Zagrebu: Radovi Zavoda za hrvatsku povijest Filozofskoga fakulteta Sveučilišta u Zagrebu (in Croatian). 32–33 (1). Zagreb: University of Zagreb: 267–276. ISSN 0353-295X.
- Matković, Stjepan (1996). "Čista stranka prava i stranački izbori na prijelazu 19. u 20. stoljeće" [The Pure Party of Right and Parliamentary Elections at the Turn of the 19th Century]. Povijesni prilozi (in Croatian). 15 (15). Zagreb: Croatian Institute of History: 59–91. ISSN 1848-9087.
- Matković, Stjepan (1997). "Izbori za Hrvatski sabor 1897. godine: afirmacija Khuenove autokracije" [The Elections for Croatian Parliament in 1897:Affirmation of Khuen's Autocracy]. Časopis za suvremenu povijest (in Croatian). 29 (3). Zagreb: Croatian Institute of History: 469–488. ISSN 0590-9597.
- Matković, Stjepan (2008). "Prilozi za politički životopis Ive Franka i evoluciju pravaštva" [Contributions for a Political Biography of Ivo Frank and Evolution of the Party of Right's Ideology]. Časopis za suvremenu povijest (in Croatian). 40 (3). Zagreb: Hrvatski institut za povijest: 1067–1086. ISSN 0590-9597.
- Miljan, Goran (2018). Croatia and the Rise of Fascism: The Youth Movement and the Ustasha During WWII. London: I.B. Tauris. ISBN 978-1-78831-209-7.
- Miller, Nicholas J. (2010). Between Nation and State: Serbian Politics in Croatia Before the First World War. University of Pittsburgh Press. ISBN 978-0-8229-7722-3.
- Newman, John Paul (2015). Yugoslavia in the Shadow of War: Veterans and the Limits of State Building, 1903–1945. Cambridge: Cambridge University Press. ISBN 978-1-107-07076-9.
- Ramet, Sabrina P. (2006). The Three Yugoslavias: State-Building and Legitimation, 1918–2005. Bloomington: Indiana University Press. ISBN 978-0-253-34656-8.
- Šetić, Nevio (2014). "Odnos istarskih pravaša prema raskolu u Stranci prava Banske Hrvatske 1895" [Relation of the Istrian Members of the Party of Rights Toward the Disunion in the Party of Rights in Ban's Croatia of 1895]. Tabula: časopis Filozofskog fakulteta, Sveučilište Jurja Dobrile u Puli (in Croatian) (12) 137517. Pula: Juraj Dobrila University of Pula: 233–244. doi:10.32728/tab.12.2014.20. ISSN 1331-7830.
- Šokčević, Dinko (2023). "Kasni odjeci teorijske pripreme zavjere: pitanje jednoga političkog plana iz 17. stoljeća u mađarskom (i, neposredno, u hrvatskom) javnom životu 1868. godine i politička pozadina objavljivanja spisa i nastanka znanstvene monografije Gyule Paulera o "Uroti"" [Late Reverberations of Theoretical Preparations for the Conspiracy: A Political Plan from the 17th Century in the Hungarian (and the Croatian) Public Life in 1868; Political Background to the Publication of an Act and the Creation of the Scientific Monograph by Gyula Pauler on the "Conspiracy"]. Rad Hrvatske akademije znanosti i umjetnosti : Razred za društvene znanosti (in Croatian). 57 (57=560). Zagreb: Croatian Academy of Sciences and Arts: 59–74. doi:10.21857/mwo1vcrpey. ISSN 1848-7904.
- Tanner, Marcus (2010). Croatia: A Nation Forged in War (3rd ed.). New Haven: Yale University Press. ISBN 978-0-300-16394-0.
- Tomasevich, Jozo (2002). War and Revolution in Yugoslavia, 1941–1945: Occupation and Collaboration. Stanford, California: Stanford University Press. ISBN 978-0-8047-0857-9.
- Trutanić, Jure (2021). "David Starčević u raskolu Stranke prava 1895" [David Starčević and the 1895 Schism in the Party of Right]. Radovi Zavoda za hrvatsku povijest Filozofskoga fakulteta Sveučilišta u Zagrebu (in Croatian). 53 (2). Zagreb: Faculty of Humanities and Social Sciences, University of Zagreb: 179–204. doi:10.17234/RadoviZHP.53.21. ISSN 0353-295X.
- Veselinović, Velimir (2014). "Obnavljanje i djelovanje Hrvatske stranke prava, 1990–1992" [Renewal and Political Activism of the Croatian Party of Rights (HSP), 1990–1992]. Politička misao: časopis za politologiju (in Croatian). 51 (2). Zagreb: Faculty of Political Science, University of Zagreb: 55–87. ISSN 0032-3241.
- Veselinović, Velimir (2018). "Pregled razvoja pravaške ideologije i politike" [An Overview of the Development of Rightist Ideology and Politics]. Časopis za suvremenu povijest (in Croatian). 50 (3). Zagreb: Croatian Institute of History: 583–620. doi:10.22586/csp.v50i3.105. ISSN 0590-9597.
- Vujačić, Veljko (2015). Nationalism, Myth, and the State in Russia and Serbia. Cambridge University Press. p. 202. ISBN 9781107074088.
