= 1911 Croatian parliamentary election =

- 15–17 December 1911

84 seats in the Sabor
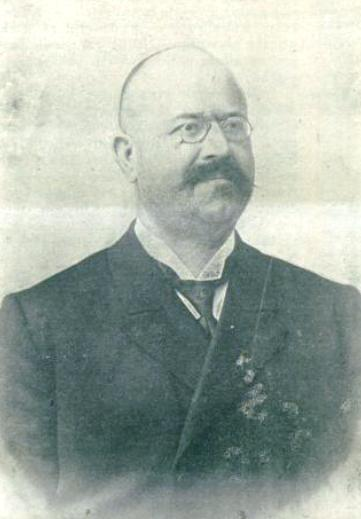

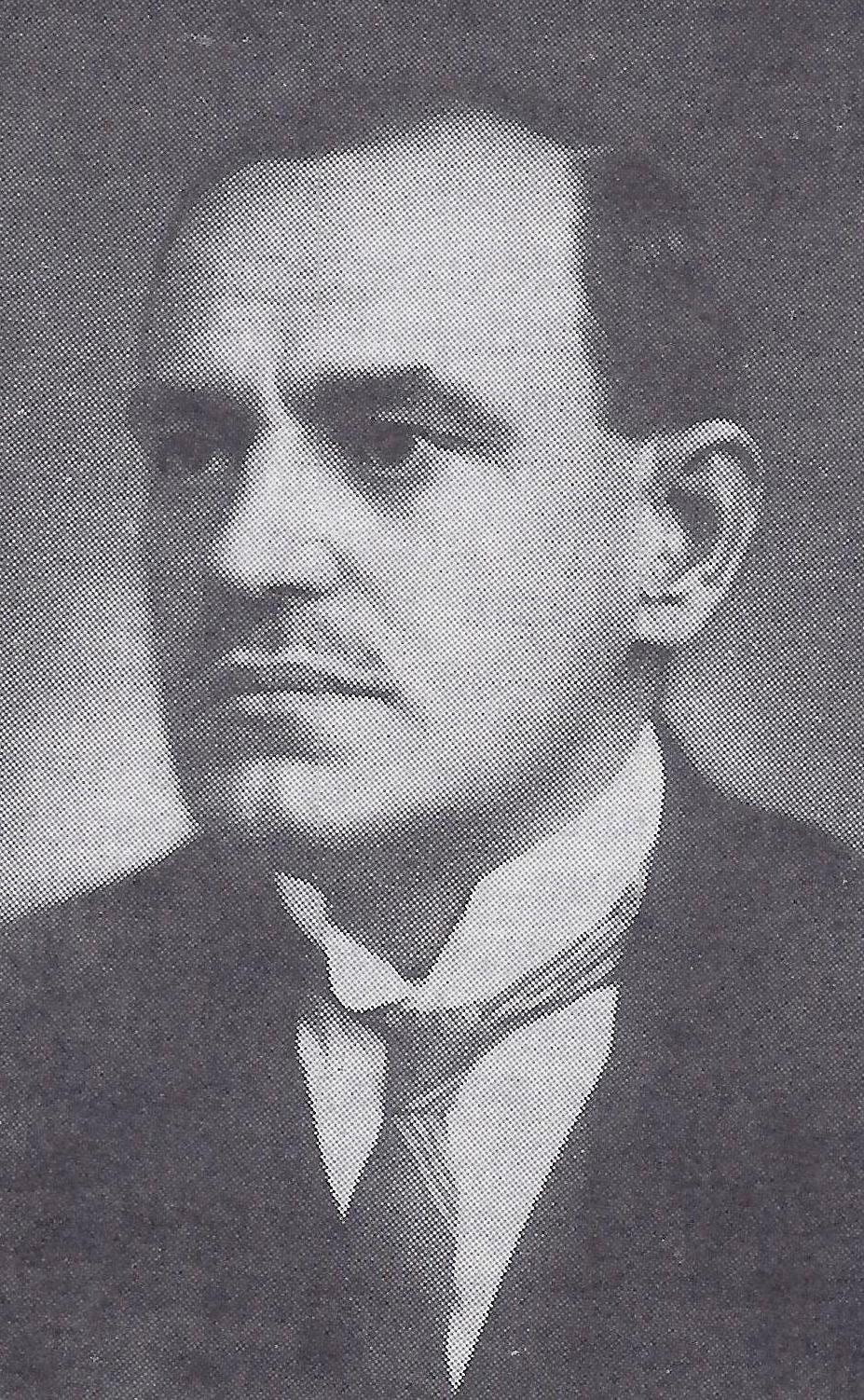

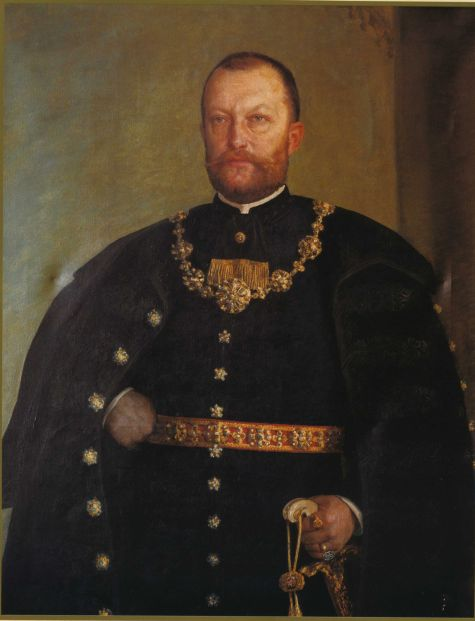
| | First party | Second party | Third party |
|---|---|---|---|
| Leader | Mile Starčević | Svetozar Pribićević | Nikola Tomašić |
| Party | Party of Rights (Milinovci–Frankist alliance) | Croat-Serb Coalition | Party of People's Progress |
| Seats won | 27 / 84 | 24 / 84 | 21 / 84 |
| Seat change | ▲3 | ▼11 | ▲3 |
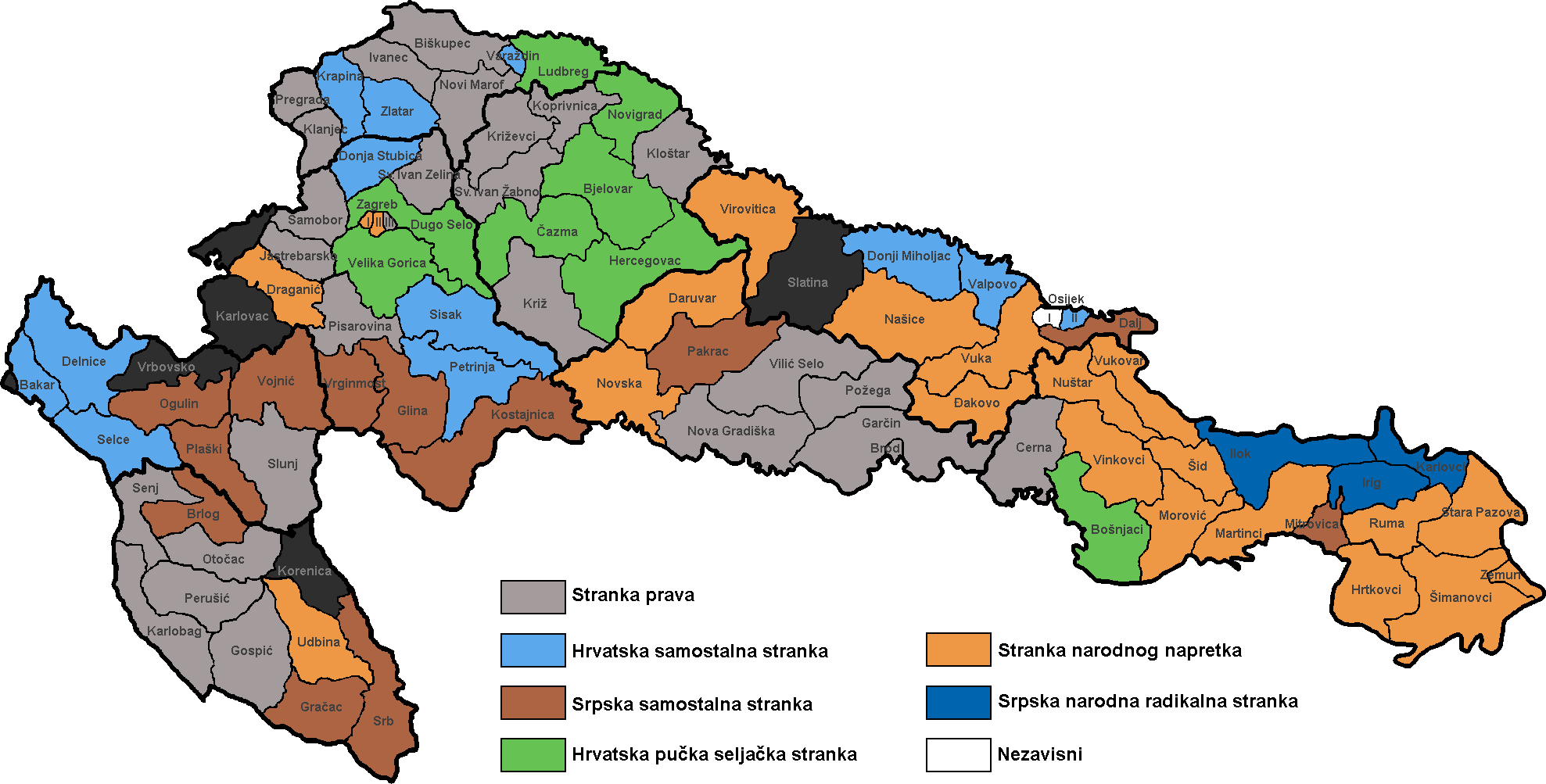
- Results of the election in each of the electoral districts in 8 counties of the Kingdom of Croatia-Slavonia: the party with the plurality of votes in each district. Party of Rights Croatian Independent Party Serb Independent Party Party of People's Progress Croatian Peoples' Peasant Party; Serb People's Radical Party Independent

Parliamentary elections were held in Croatia-Slavonia in December 1911. Despite efforts of Ban Nikola Tomašić to coerce voters to vote for pro-government parties, the result was unfavourable as the government won only 21 seats. Elections in 4 districts were suspended and in 1 district the results were challenged. On the last day of the elections Josip Frank, former leader of the Frankists, died in Zagreb.

== Results ==
| Party or alliance | | Seats | +/– |
|---|---|---|---|
| Party of Rights (Milinovci–Frankist alliance) | | 27 | +3 |
| Croat-Serb Coalition | Croatian Independent Party | 12 | –6 |
| Croat-Serb Coalition | Serb Independent Party | 12 | –3 |
| Party of People's Progress | | 21 | +3 |
| Croatian People's Peasant Party | | 8 | –1 |
| Serb People's Radical Party | | 3 | +2 |
| Independents | | 1 | 0 |
| Total | | 84 | –4 |
