= Vladimir Prebeg =

Croatian politician and lawyer

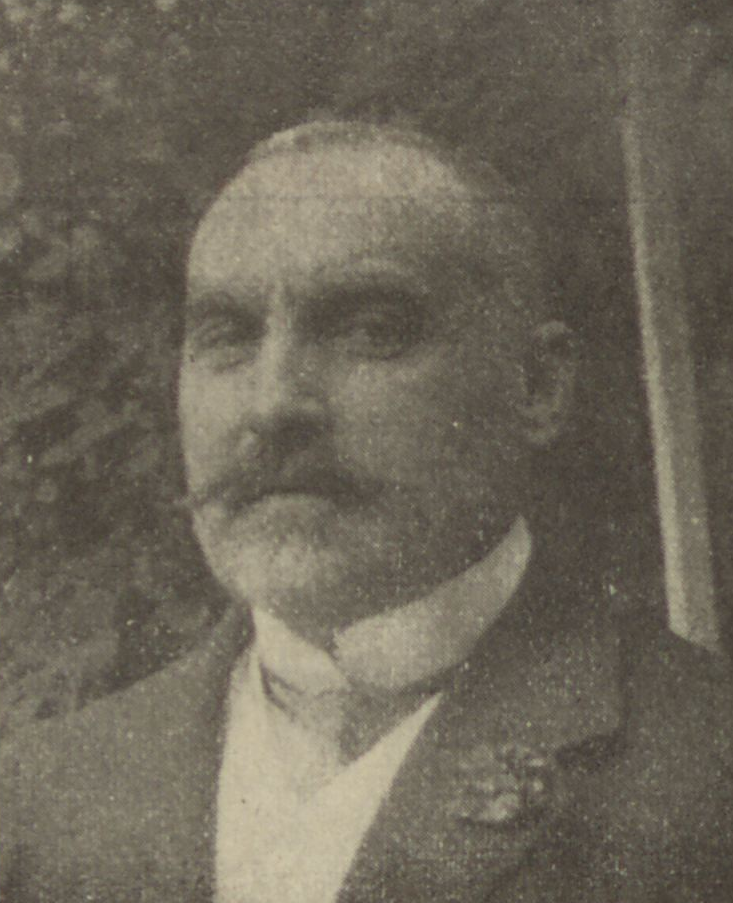
- Vladimir Prebeg (pictured in 1914)
- Born: 4 March 1862; Brod na Savi, Slavonian Military Frontier, Austrian Empire (now Croatia)
- Died: 17 February 1944 (aged 81); Zagreb, Independent State of Croatia (now Croatia)
- Education: University of Zagreb
- Occupations: Politician, lawyer
- Political party: Croatian Party of Rights (Frankists)

Vladimir Prebeg (4 March 1862 – 17 February 1944) was a Croatian and Yugoslavian politician and lawyer.

Vladimir Prebeg graduated law and received a doctoral degree from the Faculty of Law, University of Zagreb in 1886 before taking up the position of a royal notary public in Đakovo. In 1908, Prebeg joined the Croatian Party of Rights (Frankists). He won a seat in the Sabor in the 1910 Croatian parliamentary election and held it until after the World War I and the dissolution of Austria-Hungary in 1918. Following establishment of the Kingdom of Serbs, Croats and Slovenes that year (renamed Yugoslavia in 1929), Prebeg became the president of the Croatian Party of Rights, taking over from Aleksandar Horvat.

Shortly before establishment of the Kingdom of Serbs, Croats and Slovenes, Prebeg announced his intention to propose dissolution of the Croatian Party of Rights at the sitting of the Sabor where the decisions of the National Council of Slovenes, Croats and Serbs to abolish ties with Austria-Hungary and declare the independent State of Slovenes, Croats and Serbs were approved. However, the party leadership declined the proposal. The short-lived state was abolished through creation of the Kingdom of Serbs, Croats and Slovenes on 1 December 1918. In 1919, Prebeg co-authored the programme of the Croatian Party of Rights with the party secretary Ante Pavelić. The programme called for an independent Croatian state in a loose alliance with Serbia, Montenegro, and Bulgaria. Prebeg's programme relied on the Croatian state right and legal means to achieve the programme goals.

In the same year, Prebeg and Josip Pazman co-authored a public letter against the Temporary National Representation (the new kingdom's provisional legislative body) because it excluded the Croatian Party of Rights from its ranks. The protest letter was sent to the central government in Belgrade as well as to the Paris Peace Conference. In response, Prebeg and Pazman were arrested upon direction of Interior Minister Svetozar Pribićević. As a consequence, Prebeg was convicted and briefly imprisoned in 1920. From 1920 until 1930, Prebeg was a member of the Zagreb Assembly. After the Axis Invasion of Yugoslavia and establishment of the puppet state of the Independent State of Croatia (NDH), Prebeg took part in work of the Sabor convened by the NDH-ruling Ustaše in 1942.

== Sources ==
- "Prebeg, Vladimir". Croatian Encyclopedia (in Croatian). Miroslav Krleža Institute of Lexicography.
- Veselinović, Velimir (2018). "Preged razvoja pravaške ideologije i politike" [An Overview of the Development of Rightist Ideology and Politics]. Časopis za suvremenu povijest (in Croatian). 50 (3). Zagreb: Croatian Institute of History: 583–620. ISSN 0590-9597.
