= Croatian National Legion =

- Hrvatska narodna legija
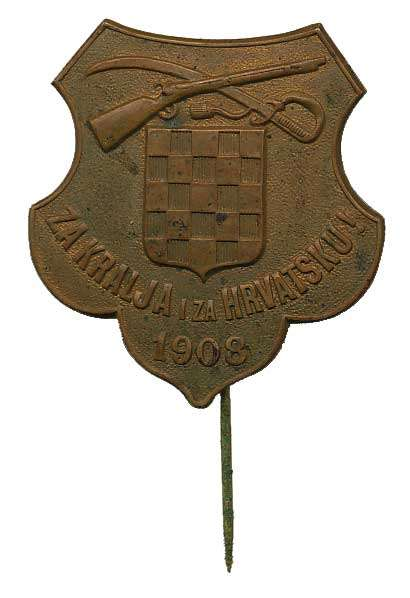
- Metal badge of Croatian National Legion
- Active: 1908-1910
- Country: Austria-Hungary
- Allegiance: Pure Party of Rights
- Type: Paramilitary
- Size: 20,000 (1908)
- Nicknames: "Frankovci" and "Legionaši"
- Motto: "Za kralja i za Hrvatsku"

The Croatian National Legion was a paramilitary unit of the Pure Party of Rights.

== History ==
The formation of the Croatian National Legion was connected with the crisis that followed the annexation of Bosnia and Herzegovina by Austria-Hungary in October 1908. The annexation triggered political reactions throughout the region and contributed to escalating tensions between Austria-Hungary and the Kingdom of Serbia. During the crisis, the Serbian nationalist organization National Defence was founded in Belgrade with the aim of mobilizing volunteers and promoting nationalist agitation. These developments encouraged the emergence of mobilization initiatives among Croatian nationalist circles. The Croats began to establish the volunteer Croatian National Legion. This idea was intended to counter the planned incursions of military and paramilitary units from Serbia ( the Serbian army, Chetnik and Komita detachments, National Defence, etc.) Preparations for this unit were initiated by Pravash leader Josip Frank . An important role in the organization of this legion belongs to writer Milan Ogrizović.

On November 5, 1908, a Frankist conference was held in Zagreb at which the legion was officially founded. The conference was attended by party representatives and supporters from Croatia, Dalmatia, and Bosnia and Hercegovina. At the conference, Mehmedbeg Bajraktarević gave a speech "on behalf of all Muslims of Bosnia and Hercegovina". He said that "Muslims from Bosnia and Herzegovina want to propagate the idea of unifying all Croatian lands with their Starčević brothers" and that together with the Pure Party of Rights "thousands of Croatian Muslims are ready to rush to the Drina River in defense of Croatian sacred places and the legacy of their ancestors".

Chetnik incursions from Serbia did not occur, but the unit was not disbanded, but was used for confronting other parties. They also clashed with the police and became known as the most militant part of Croatian politics.

== Insignia ==
The insignia worn by members is a badge with the inscription For the King and the Homeland on a background in the Croatian colors: red-white-blue.
