= 1910 Croatian parliamentary election =

- 28 October 1910

88 seats in the Sabor
- Turnout: 59.05%
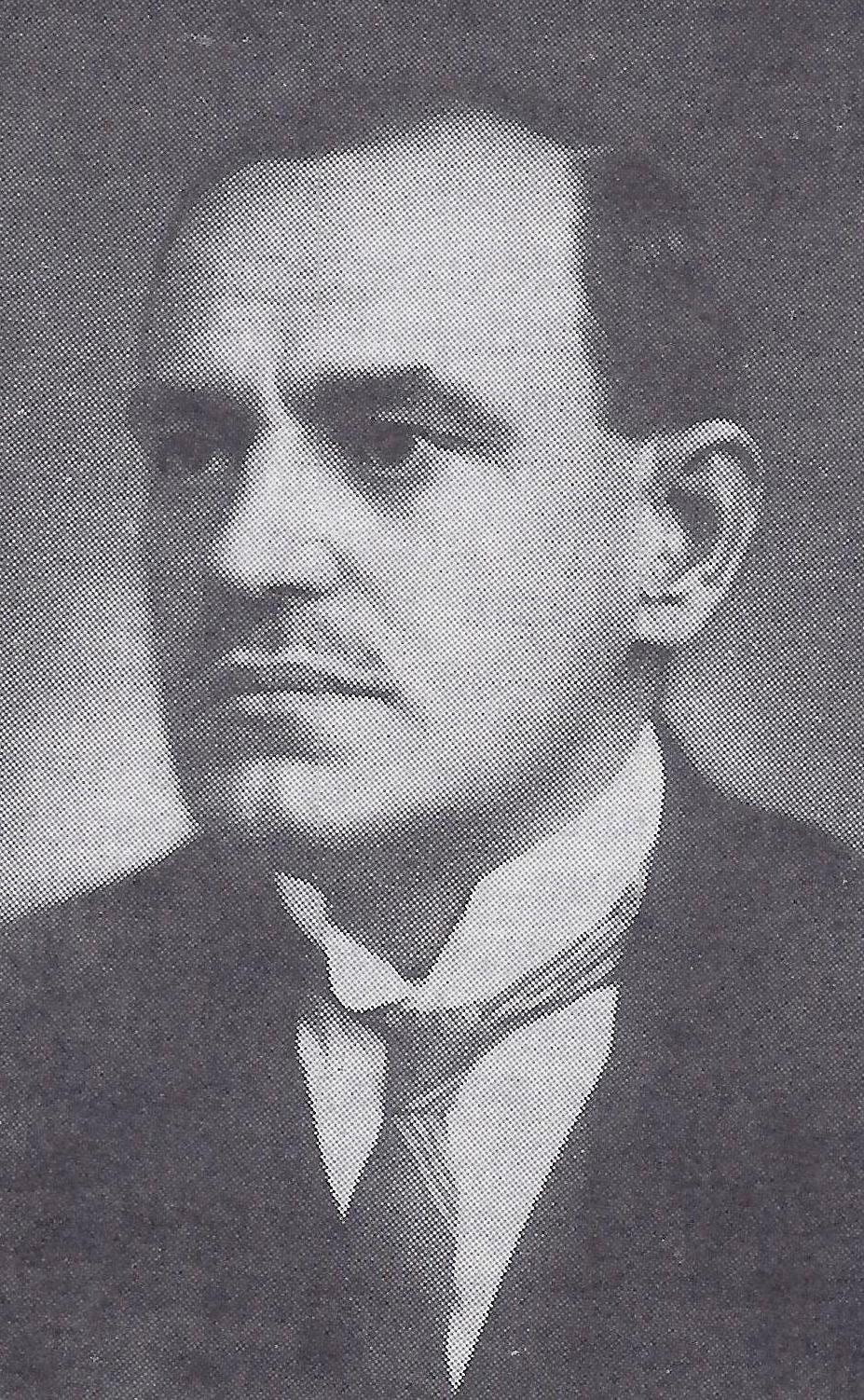

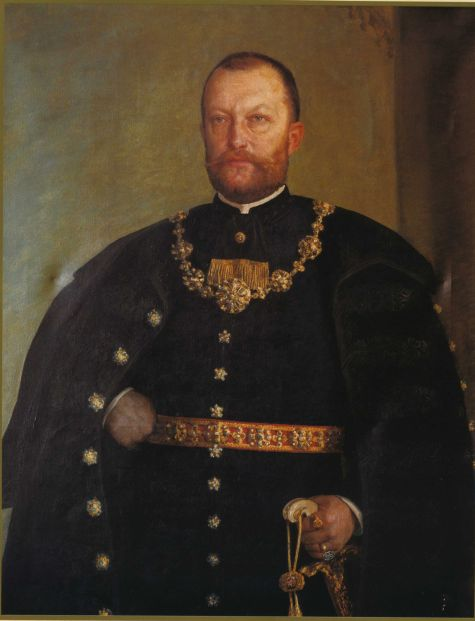

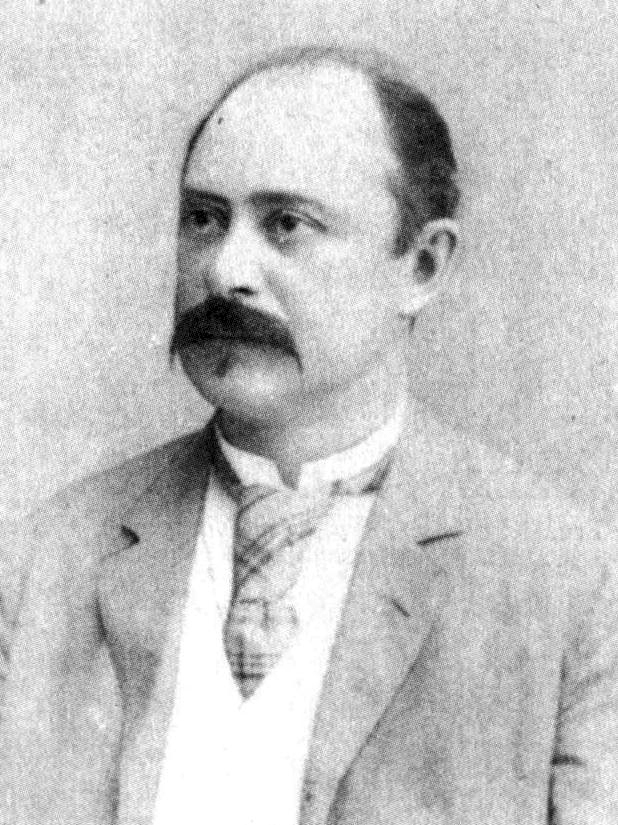
	First party	Second party	Third party
Leader	Svetozar Pribićević	Nikola Tomašić	Josip Frank
Party	Croat-Serb Coalition	People's Party	Frankists
Seats won	35 / 88	18 / 88	15 / 88
Seat change	▼21	▲18	▼9
Popular vote	37,717	20,126	23,086
Percentage	33.60%	17.93%	20.57%
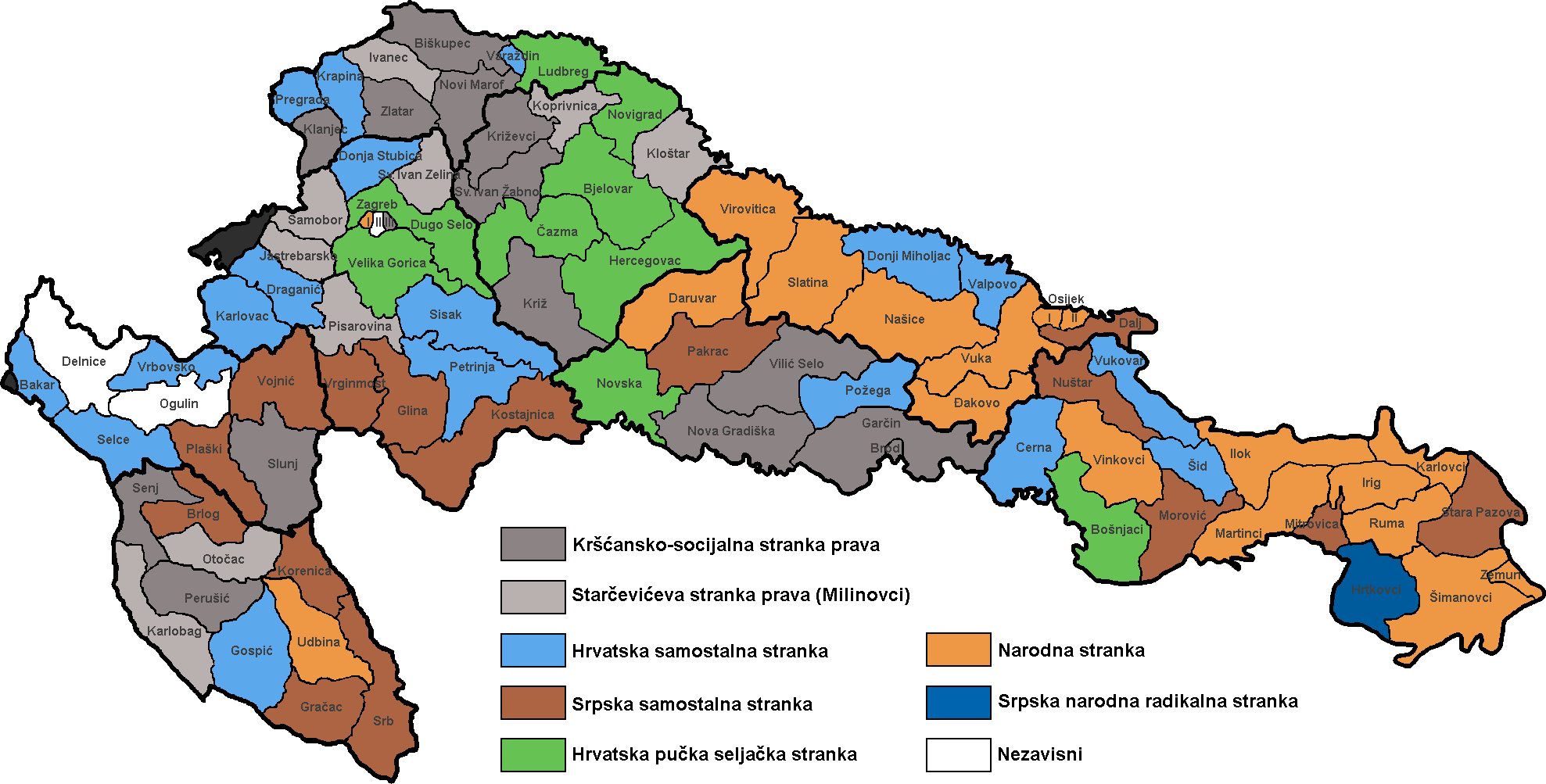
- Results of the election in each of the electoral districts in 8 counties of the Kingdom of Croatia-Slavonia: the party with the plurality of votes in each district. Frankists Milinovci; People's Party Croatian Independent Party Serb Independent Party Croatian Peoples' Peasant Party Serb People's Radical Party Independent

Parliamentary elections were held in the Kingdom of Croatia-Slavonia on 28 October 1910 to elect the members of the Sabor. The elections were called by ban Nikola Tomašić after the adoption of a new Law of the Electoral Order.

== Results ==
Party or alliance		Votes	%	Seats
Croat-Serb Coalition	Croatian Independent Party	25,040	22.31	18
Croat-Serb Coalition	Serb Independent Party	10,287	9.16	15
Croat-Serb Coalition	Independents	2,390	2.13	2
Croat-Serb Coalition	Total	37,717	33.60	35
Frankists		23,086	20.57	15
People's Party		20,126	17.93	18
Croatian People's Peasant Party		14,029	12.50	9
Milinovci		10,264	9.14	9
Serb People's Radical Party		3,307	2.95	1
Social Democratic Party of Croatia and Slavonia		1,756	1.56	0
Independents		1,964	1.75	1
Total		112,249	100.00	88
Registered voters/turnout		190,096	–	

=== Elected representatives ===
==== Croatian Peoples' Peasant Party ====
- Vinko Lovreković

==== Party of Rights ====
- Franjo Hrustić
