= Serb Independent Party =

Serb political party

Serb Independent Party (Serbian: Srpska samostalna stranka, SSS, German: Serbische selbständige Partei), also known as Serb Autonomous Party or simply Serb Autonomists, was an ethnic Serb political party in the Kingdom of Croatia-Slavonia, under the Austro-Hungarian Empire. It was established in August 1881, in Ruma, by Pavle Jovanović and other affluent Serbs. In 1903 Svetozar Pribićević (1875–1936) became the party leader. They published Srbobran, which was the party organ. The party advocated for the unification of Lika, Kordun, Banija, Dalmatia, Slavonia and Bosnia and Herzegovina with Serbia to form a Greater Serbia. It was later one of the key members of the Croat-Serb coalition (formed in 1905).

It was formed by the Serbs of Croatia in response to the merging of the Military Frontier, inhabited by the Serbs, back into the Kingdom of Croatia.

The party at first worked in concert with the Hungarian interests in Croatia, led by ban Károly Khuen-Héderváry. In 1903, however, under its new leader Svetozar Pribićević it started to collaborate with Croatian parties through the New Course Policy. It eventually merged into the Croat-Serb Coalition in 1905.

After the 1908 Austro-Hungarian annexation of Bosnia, a lesser known Bosnian party of the same name was formed, which participated in the Diet of Bosnia. In 1909 it was involved in the scandalous Agram Trial.

After World War I, in 1919 its members mostly joined the Yugoslav Democratic Party in the Kingdom of Serbs, Croats and Slovenes, created by a merger of a wide range of political parties and coalitions, the one from Croatia being the Croato-Serb coalition. The individualism of the SNSS members, though, was never fully erased, and in 1924 most of the former members left JDS and formed the Independent Democratic Party, under the same leadership of the SNSS (president Svetozar Pribicevic).

== See also ==
- Independent Democratic Serb Party (contemporary political party)

== Sources ==
- Artuković, Mato (2001). Srbi u Hrvatskoj: Khuenovo doba (in Croatian).
- Ćirković, Sima (2004). The Serbs. Malden: Blackwell Publishing. ISBN 9781405142915.
- Miller, Nicholas J. (1997). Between Nation and State: Serbian Politics in Croatia Before the First World War. Pittsburgh: University of Pittsburgh Press. ISBN 9780822977223.
- Pavličević, Dragutin. "The Promotion of Great Serbian Ideology in the Period of Croatian-Serbian Coalition (1905-1909)." Moslavačko zrcalo, Časopis moslavačkih ogranaka Matice hrvatske 3.1-2 (2013): 61–78.
