= Josip Frank =

Croatian lawyer and politician

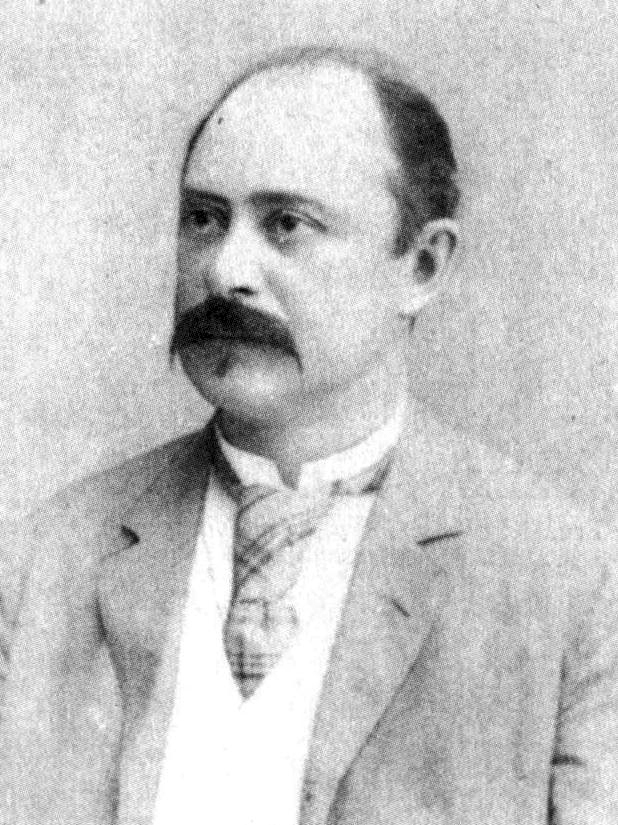
- Born: Joshua Frank; 16 April 1844; Osijek, Kingdom of Slavonia, Austrian Empire
- Died: 17 December 1911 (aged 67); Zagreb, Kingdom of Croatia-Slavonia, Austria-Hungary
- Occupations: Lawyer, politician
- Political party: Party of Rights; Pure Party of Rights
- Children: Ivo Frank

Josip Frank (pronounced [jǒsip frâŋk]; 16 April 1844 – 17 December 1911) was a Croatian lawyer and politician, a noted representative of the Party of Rights and the Pure Party of Rights in the Croatian Parliament, and a vocal advocate of Croatian national independence in Austria-Hungary.

== Early life ==
Frank was born into a Croatian-Jewish family, but converted to Catholicism at the age of 18 and attended the gymnasium in Osijek. He studied at the Vienna University, graduating in 1868, and moved Zagreb in 1872 to work as an attorney at law.

== Political career ==
Frank's initial political involvement included a critique of the People's Party (of Josip Juraj Strossmayer), joining the opinion of ban Levin Rauch. When Ivan Mažuranić became Croatian ban in 1873, Frank criticized him because of his relations with the Magyars and the Serbs.

In 1877, he founded the newspapers Agramer Presse and Kroatische Post. They were both banned by Austro-Hungarian authorities.

In 1880, Frank was elected to the Zagreb city council, and published a brochure titled Die Quote Kroatiens, arguing that Croatia's finances had been disproportionately affected by the 1868 Nagodba (Compromise).

In 1880, Croatian poet August Šenoa described Frank as:

The infamous Zagreb attorney […] degrades and befouls all that is Croatian, first to the benefit of the Magyars, now of the Austrians […] Frank is a political louse, who served Rauch, then the Swabian Generalkommando […] he offered himself to the Orthodox voter in Pakrac, bragging about […] protecting Serbian interests.

In 1884, Frank was elected as an independent delegate to the Croatian Sabor, representing the Kotar of Popovača. In 1887, he was elected to represent the Kotar of Vojni Križ.

In 1890, supported by Fran Folnegović, he joined Ante Starčević's Party of Rights, soon advancing to the highest ranks of the party. Frank became instrumental in the writing of the political program of the Party of Rights, published on June 6, 1894. In 1895, after an incident in which students from Zagreb publicly burned the Hungarian flag in front of Emperor Franz Joseph, a rift formed in the party as Folnegović and others condemned that act. Frank convinced Starčević to split off the faction, becoming the Pure Party of Rights. After Starčević 's, Frank became the party's president. Frank's Party of Rights was opposed to the Party of Rights led by Frano Supilo and other advocates of the policy of a "New Course", of alignment towards Serbs.

Frank maintained an interest in financial matters, which earned him a regular place in the Croatian Parliament's finance committee, and later in the budget committee. He was a member of the board of financial matters of the Kingdom of Croatia between 1898 and 1906. In 1898, he published a treatise called Nuncij where he harshly accused Hungary for a perceived injustice in the financial terms of the settlement between Croatia and Hungary. In 1904 Frank reiterated his demands for a financial independence of Croatia, and in part due to his efforts, in 1906 a new financial agreement between Croatia and Hungary was formed which was considered the most beneficial to the Croatian side.

One of the most important characteristics of the Frank's followers was their anti-Serb position. After Peter I Karađorđević came to power in Serbia in 1903, Frank's attention increasingly turned to opposing any rapprochement with the Serbs, unlike the majority opinion represented by the Croato-Serbian Coalition. In the 1906 election the Party of Rights became the main opposition to the Coalition, and quite a staunch one at that, collaborating with ban Pavao Rauch (1908-1910), who represented the interests of Austria and Hungary, to depose the Coalition because of its "Yugoslav" programme. During the Bosnian annexation crisis in 1908, he was the initiator of a persecution of Serbs accused for high treason. Frank also played a role in the infamous Friedjung trial of 1909 where it would be proved that the Austrian historian Heinrich Friedjung reproduced libellous claims of treason against the leaders of the Croato-Serbian Coalition. Josip Frank carried on Starčević's ideology, and defined Croat identity 'strictly in terms of Serbophobia'. He opposed any cooperation between Croats and Serbs, and the historian Aleksa Djilas described him as "a leading anti-Serbian demagogue and the instigator of the persecution of Serbs in Croatia". His followers, called Frankovci, were the most ardent Ustashe members.

Unlike Ante Starčević, that was anticlerical, Frank considered to be useful collaboration with Catholic church in Croatia.

During the annexation crisis when Austria-Hungary annexed Bosnia and Herzegovina, Frank prepared the formation of the paramilitary unit Croatian National Legion.

Josip Frank's support for the Austrian court in his fight against the pro-Yugoslav and pro-Serbian forces did not go unopposed within his own party, as in 1908 Mile Starčević led a faction (called the Milinovci) to form a splinter Starčević Party of Rights. In 1909 Frank fell terminally ill, and could no longer take active part in politics. He was succeeded, at the helm of the party, by Aleksandar Horvat. The party subsequently attracted a prominent group of Catholic intellectuals to join them in 1910 and changed their name to Christian-Social Party of Rights. In 1911, they reconciled with the Starčević Party of Rights, and merged back into a single Party of Rights. Frank lived to witness this, but died shortly thereafter. Frank was buried at the Mirogoj Cemetery.

== Legacy ==
The supporters of Frank's ideas in Croatian politics became known as the Frankists.

His daughter Olga was Slavko Kvaternik's wife.

== Bibliography ==
- Kraus, Ognjen (1998). Dva stoljeća povijesti i kulture Židova u Zagrebu i Hrvatskoj. Zagreb: Židovska općina Zagreb. ISBN 953-96836-2-9.
- Trbovich, Ana S. (2008). A Legal Geography of Yugoslavia's Disintegration. Oxford University Press. ISBN 978-0-19-533343-5.
