= D33 road (Croatia) =

Road in Croatia

D33 state road

Route information
- Length: 73.3 km (45.5 mi)

Major junctions
- From: Strmica border crossing to Bosnia and Herzegovina
- D1 in Knin D56 in Drniš A1 in Šibenik interchange
- To: D8 near Šibenik

Location
- Country: Croatia
- Counties: Šibenik-Knin
- Major cities: Knin, Drniš, Šibenik

Highway system
- Highways in Croatia

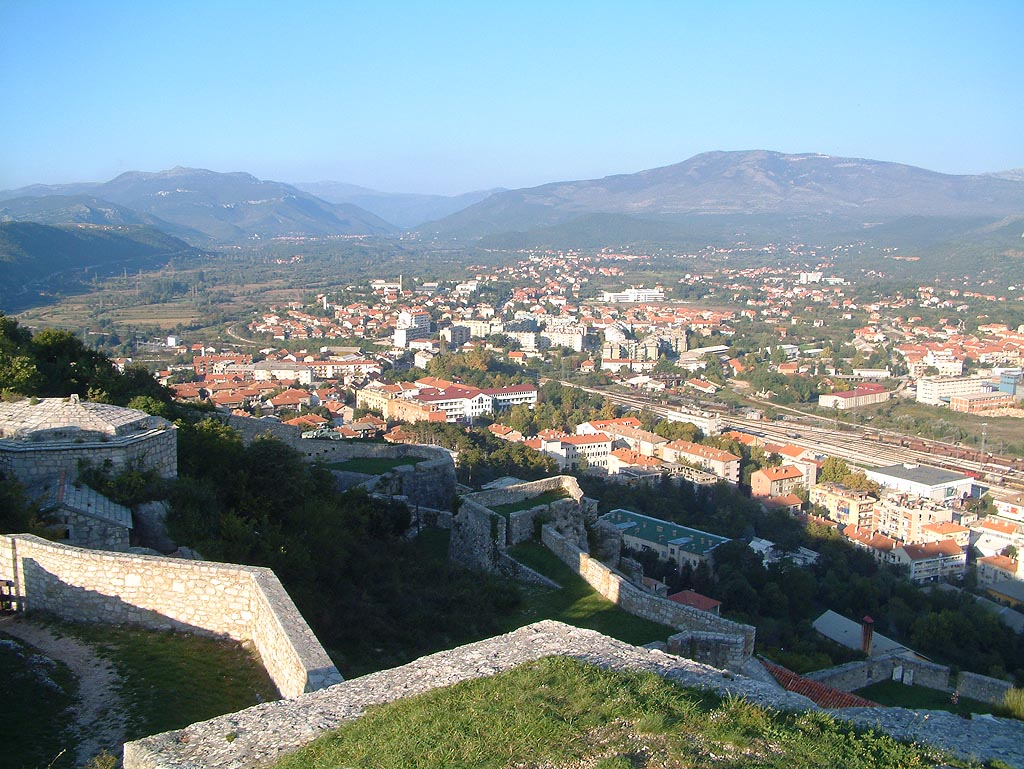
Knin, located on D33 route

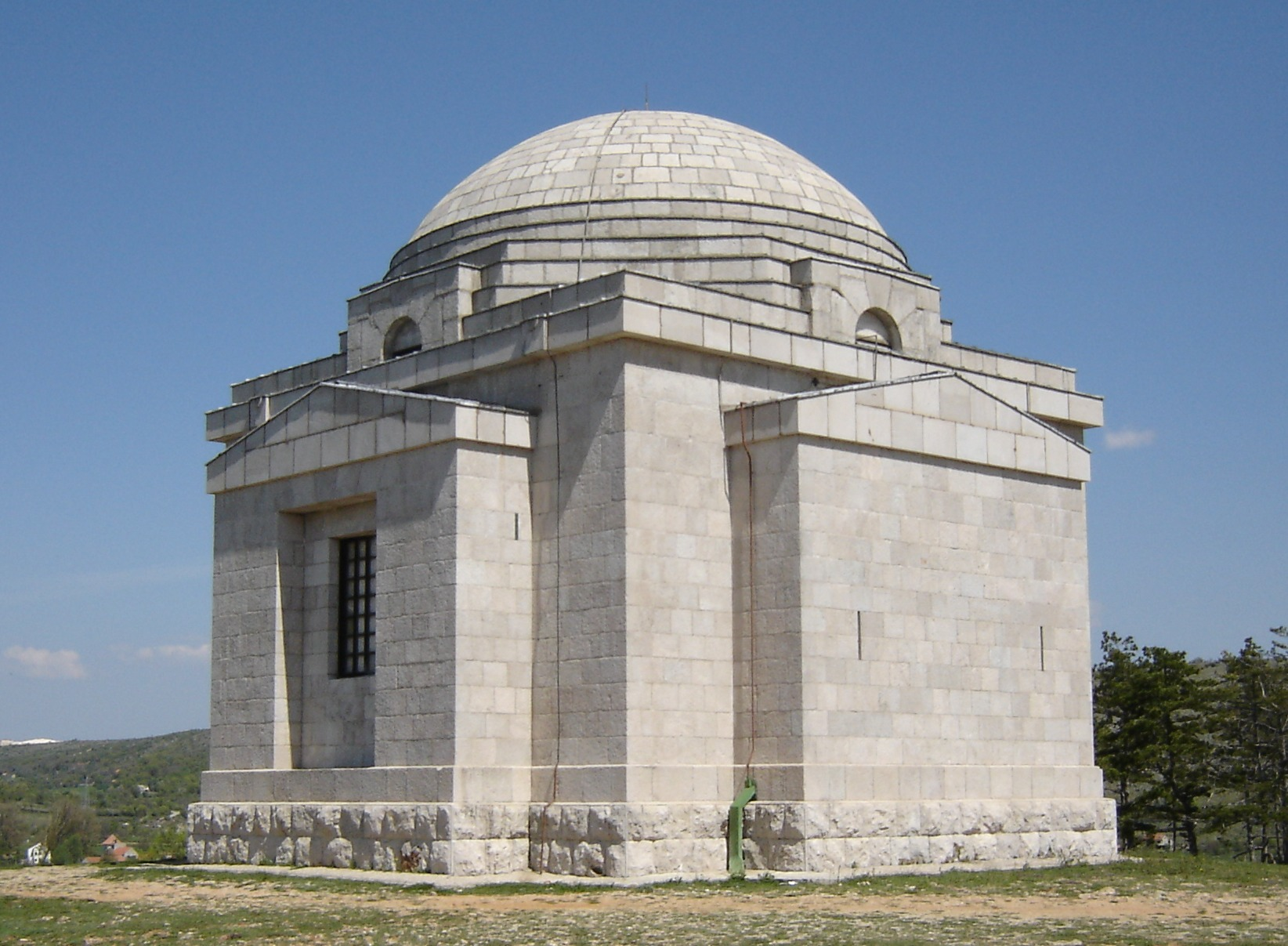
Meštrović Mausoleum in Otavice, in immediate vicinity of D33

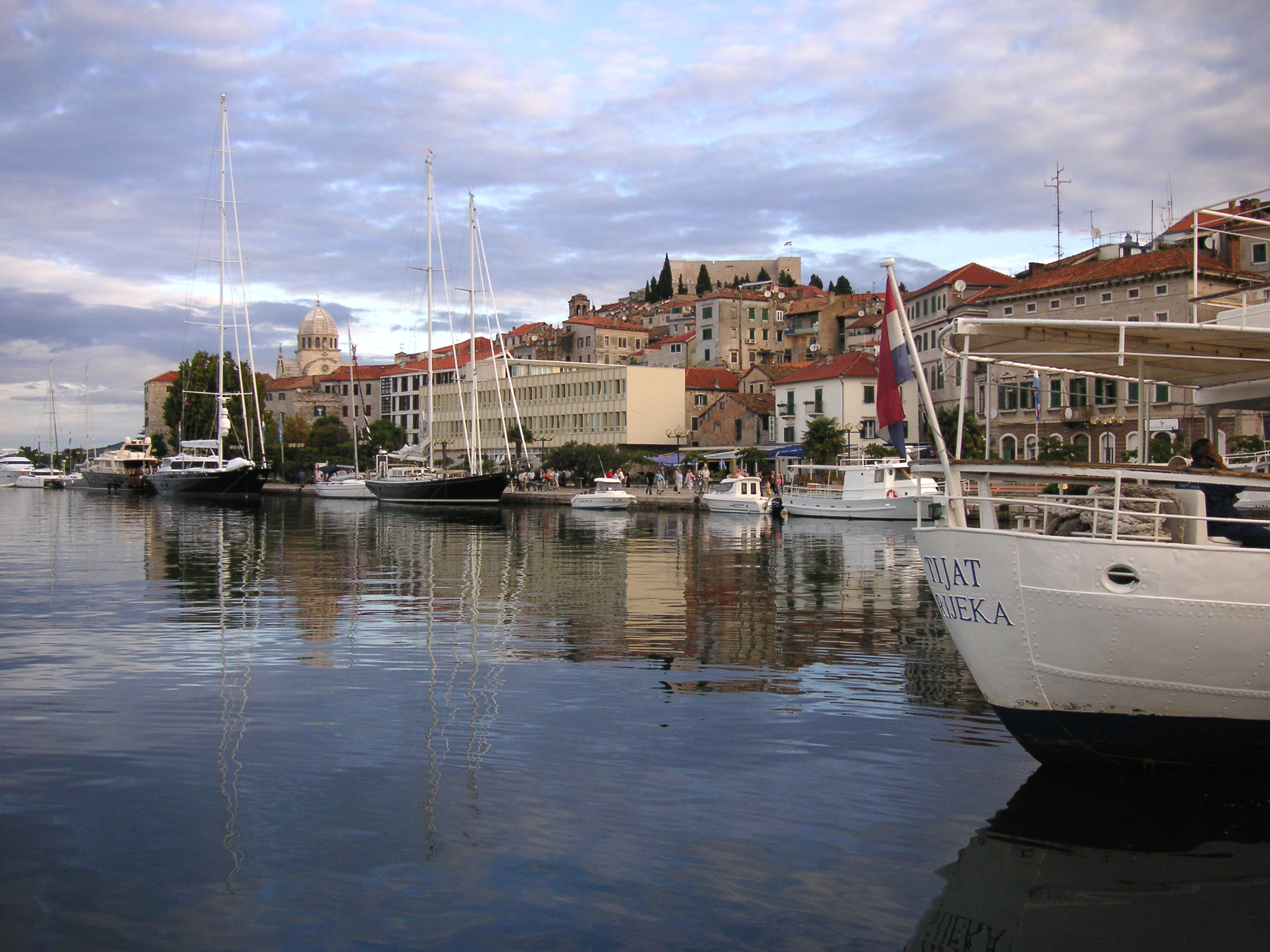
Šibenik, southern terminus of D33

D33 connects Šibenik to Drniš and Knin. Furthermore, the road has junctions to major state roads, namely D8 in Šibenik, connecting to Biograd na Moru and Trogir, and D1 in Knin, which in turn connects to Sinj to the south and to Gračac to the north. The southern terminus of the road is found in Vidici interchange near Šibenik. The road is also connected to A1 motorway in Šibenik interchange. The road is 73.3 km (45.5 mi) long. The northern terminus of the road is at Strmica border crossing to Bosnia and Herzegovina, where the road proceeds to Drvar.

Part of the road between Lozovac and Vidici interchange in Šibenik is executed as a single-carriageway, two-lane expressway with a speed limit of 80 km/h (50 mph) and, until 2012, used to be designated as D533 road.

The road, as well as all other state roads in Croatia, is managed and maintained by Hrvatske ceste, a state-owned company.

== Traffic volume ==
Traffic is regularly counted and reported by Hrvatske ceste, operator of the road. Substantial variations between annual (AADT) and summer (ASDT) traffic volumes are attributed to the fact that the road serves as a connection to A1 motorway and it carries substantial tourist traffic.

D33 traffic volume
Road	Counting site	AADT	ASDT	Notes
D33	5001 Knin - north	1,165	1,489	Adjacent to Ž6080 junction.
D33	5003 Knin - south	2,879	9,575	Between D1 and Ž6056 junctions.
D33	5004 Vrbnik - south	2,027	2,298	Between Ž6056 and Ž6079 junctions.
D33	5412 Pakovo Selo	1,862	2,712	Between Ž6094 and Ž6078 junctions.
D33	5412 Pakovo Selo - south	2,463	3,539	Adjacent to A1 motorway Šibenik interchange.
D33	5322 Dubrava Šibenska	7,814	13,058	Adjacent to D8 junction.

== Road junctions and populated areas ==
D33 junctions/populated areas
Type	Slip roads/Notes
	Strmica border crossing to Bosnia and Herzegovina. The northern terminus of the road.
	Ž6080 to Kninsko Polje.
	Knin; D1 to Gračac (to the north) and Sinj (to the south).
	Vrbnik; Ž6056 to Oklaj, Karalić and Širitovci.
	Ramljane; Ž6079 to Orlić.
	Zvjerinac; Ž6058 to Riđane, Orlić and Biskupija.
	Ž6247 to Uzdolje.
	Ž6081 to Biočić, Mioćić and Parčić.
	Siverić; Ž6082 to Vrlika, Ježević, Bajagić and Otok.
	Ž6095 to Kadina Glavica, Gradac and Baljci.
	Drniš; Ž6246 to Širitovci and Đevrske (D59). D56 to Gornji Muć and Klis-Grlo interchange (D1) (to the southeast). The D33 and D56 roads are concurrent to the south of the junction.
	Ž6094 to Žitnić and Unešić.
	L65083 to Pakovo Selo.
	Ž6078 to Kaočine and Trbounje.
	Ž6093 to Pokrovnik.
	Konjevrate; Ž6092 to Unešić and Čvrljevo.
	Lozovac; D56 to Skradin and Benkovac (to the northwest). The D33 and D56 roads are concurrent to the north of the junction.
	Ž6277 to Bilice (to the west). The northern terminus of single-carriageway, two-lane expressway.
	A1 in Šibenik interchange, to Gospić and Zagreb (to the north) and to Split and Ploče (to the south).
	Dubrava interchange Unclassified road to Šibenik (to the west) and Sitno Donje (to the east).
	The southern terminus of single-carriageway, two-lane expressway.
	Vidici interchange in Šibenik; D8 to Vodice and Biograd na Moru (to the west) and Trogir (to the east). The southern terminus of the road.

== See also ==
- Highways in Croatia
- Hrvatske autoceste
