= D54 =

D54 may refer to:

- D54 (protocol)
- a road in Dubai
- Greek destroyer Leon (D54), a Greek Navy destroyer
- INS Ranvir (D54), an Indian Navy destroyer
- D54 (Croatia), a state road in Croatia
