= D56 =

D56 or D 56 may refer to:

- D56 road (Croatia), a state road in Croatia
- D 56 road (United Arab Emirates) in Muhaisnah, Dubai Emirate
- GER Class D56, a class of British steam locomotives

and also:

- the ICD-10 code for thalassemia
