= D56 road =

Road in Croatia

D56 state road

Route information
- Length: 122.5 km (76.1 mi)

Major junctions
- From: D424 in Tromilja interchange
- D27 in Benkovac; D33 in Lozovac and in Drniš
- To: D1 in Klis-Grlo interchange

Location
- Country: Croatia
- Counties: Zadar, Šibenik-Knin, Split-Dalmatia
- Major cities: Benkovac, Skradin

Highway system
- Highways in Croatia

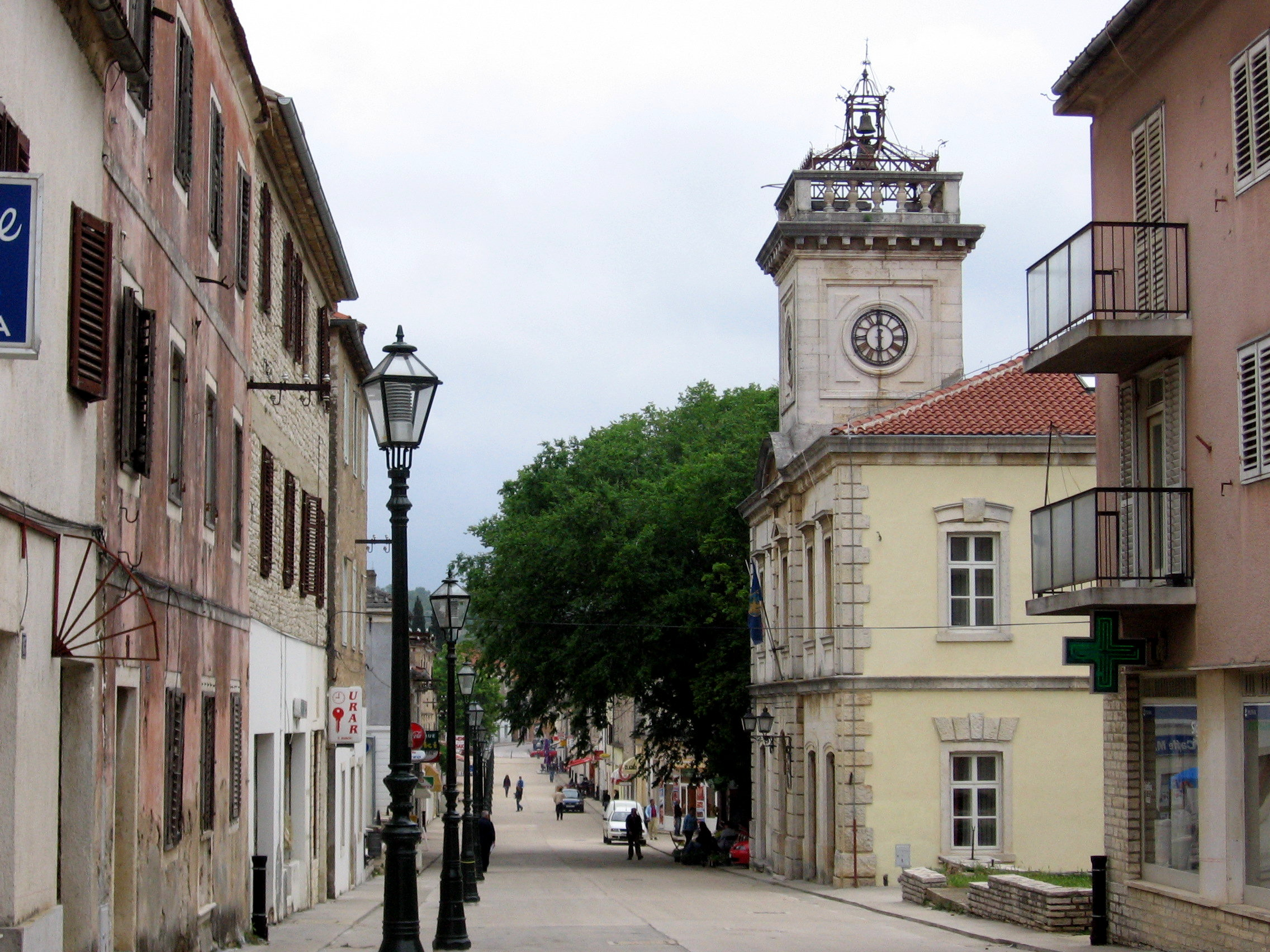
Benkovac, located on the D56 road

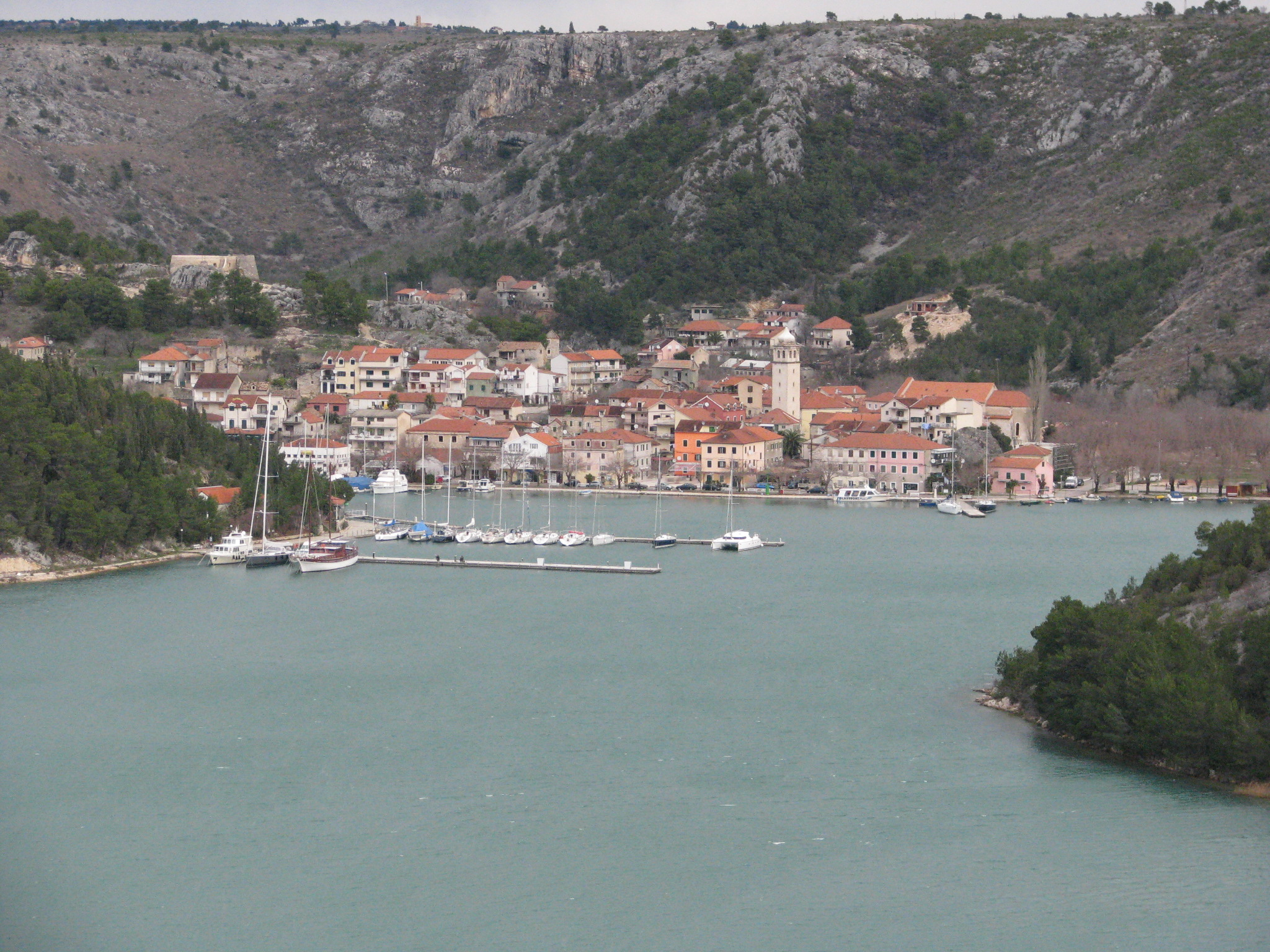
Skradin, located on the D56 road

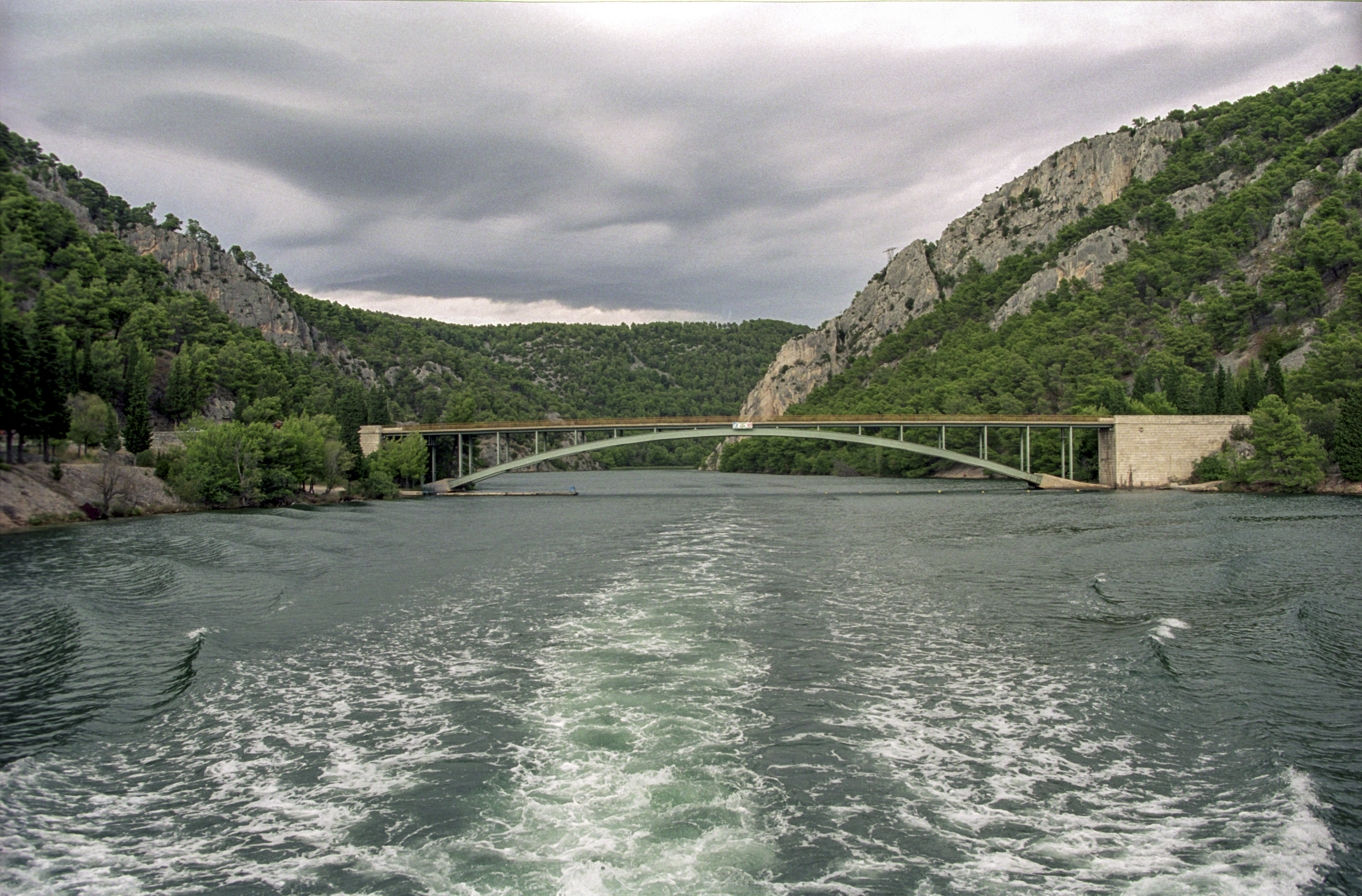
Skradin Bridge, carrying the D56 road

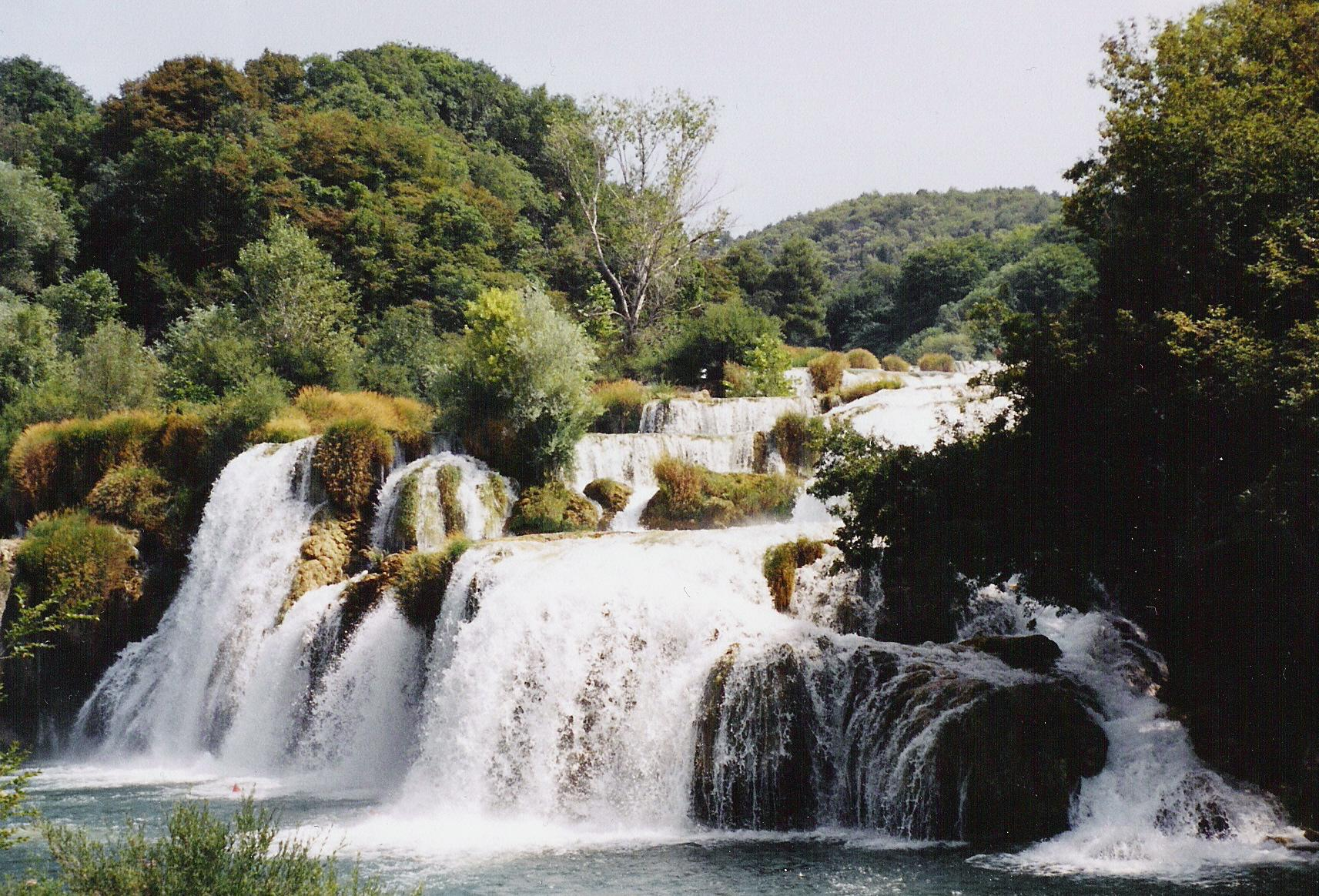
Krka National Park, accessed via D56

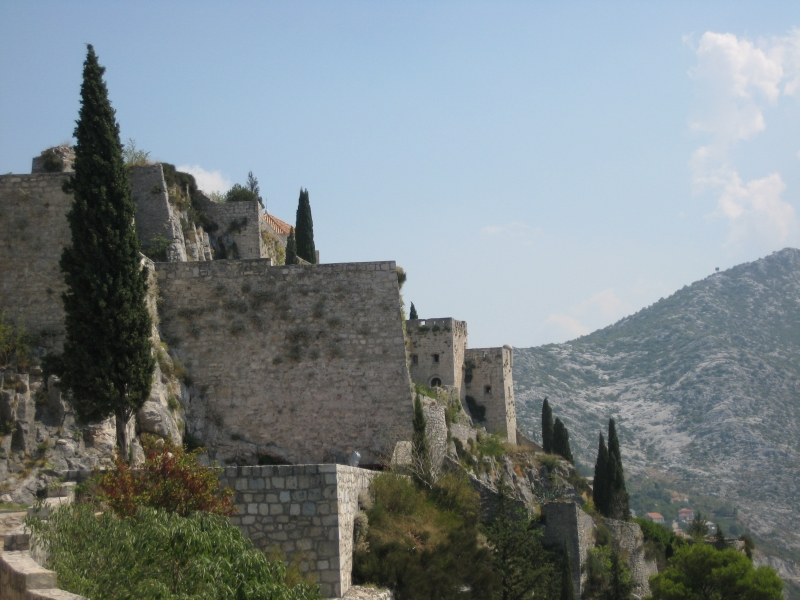
Klis Fortress, near the eastern terminus of D56

D56 runs parallel to a segment of A1 motorway between Zadar and Split areas. Furthermore the road has junctions to major state roads, namely D27 in Benkovac, connecting to D1 state road in Gračac, serving as a possible bypass of both Maslenica bridges, D424, D59 and D33 state roads. The road also connects to A1 motorway Skradin and Zadar 2 interchanges via D424 and a short connector road, respectively. The road is 122.5 km (76.1 mi) long.

The D56 road also serves as a connection to Krka National Park.

The road, as well as all other state roads in Croatia, is managed and maintained by Hrvatske ceste, a state-owned company.

== Traffic volume ==
Traffic is regularly counted and reported by Hrvatske ceste, operator of the road. Substantial variations between annual (AADT) and summer (ASDT) traffic volumes are attributed to the fact that the road serves as a connection to A1 motorway and it carries substantial tourist traffic.

D56 traffic volume
Road	Counting site	AADT	ASDT	Notes
D56	4916 Raštević	3,109	3,493	Adjacent to Ž6003 junction.
D56	5318 Lišane Oštrovičke	742	1,200	Between L63177 and L63147 junctions.
D56	5306 Skradin	1,930	3,058	Adjacent to Ž6090 junction.
D56	5413 Kljake	1,362	1,568	Between Ž6098 and Ž6099 junctions.
D56	5503 Progon - south	2,732	3,267	Between D219 and Ž6116 junctions.

== Road junctions and populated areas ==
D56 junctions/populated areas
Type	Slip roads/Notes
	Tromilja interchange D424 to Zadar and A1 motorway Zadar 2 interchange. D502 to Zemunik Donji (to the west). The western terminus of the road. D56 and D502 are concurrent for approximately 700 m (2,300 ft) to the east.
	D502 to Smilčić and Karin (to the north). The eastern limit of D56/D502 concurrency.
	Ž6044 to Škabrnje
	Donje Biljane; Ž6014 to Poličnik. Ž6258 to Smilčić and Islam Latinski.
	Benkovac; D27 to Stankovci (to the south) and Gračac (to the north). D56 and D27 are concurrent for approximately 500 m (1,600 ft) in Benkovac. The southbound D27 junction is west of the northbound one. Ž6003 to the town centre.
	Ž6051 to Kolarina.
	Ž6067 to Vukšić and Bila Vlaka.
	Žažvić
	Bribirske Mostine; D59 to Knin (to the north) and to Pirovac (to the south). There actually two D56/D59 intersections, the first one with the southbound D59, and the second one to the northbound section of D59. The two roads are concurrent for approximately 300 m (980 ft).
	Ž6073 to Piramatovci.
	Vaćani
	Gračac; Ž6089 to Sonković.
	A1 Skradin interchange to Zadar (to the north) and to Šibenik and Split (to the south). The interchange is accessed via a short connector road.
	Skradinsko Polje
	Skradin; Ž6075 to Dubravice.
	Skradin Bridge
	Ž6090 to Krka National Park.
	Gulin
	Lozovac; D33 to Šibenik (to the south). D33 and D56 to the east are concurrent.
	Konjevrate; Ž6092 to Unešić.
	Ž6093 to Pokrovnik.
	Ž6078 to Pakovo Selo.
	Ž6094 to Žitnić.
	Drniš; D33 to Knin (to the north). D33 and D56 to the west are concurrent.
	Kričke
	Ružić
	Ž6096 to Gradac.
	Ž6097 to Mirlović Polje and Čavoglave. Ž6098 to Kladnice.
	Ž6099 to Crivac.
	Gornje Postinje
	Muć
	Gornji Muć; D219 to Sinj.
	Ž6116 to Neorić and Sičane.
	Ž6114 to Brištanovo and Nisko.
	Prugovo
	Ž6115 to Konjsko.
	Ž6253 to Klis.
	D1 in Klis-Grlo interchange to Sinj (to the north) and Split to the south. The eastern terminus of the road.

== See also ==
- Hrvatske autoceste
- Krka National Park
