= Budak, Zadar County =

Budak
- Village
- Location within Croatia
- Coordinates: 43.919729°N 15.679029°E
- Country: Croatia
- County: Zadar
- Municipality: Stankovci

Area
  - Total: 11.5 km^{2} (4.4 sq mi)

Population (2021)
  - Total: 342
  - Density: 29.7/km^{2} (77.0/sq mi)
- Time zone: UTC+1 (CET)
  - Summer (DST): UTC+2 (CEST)

Budak is a village in Croatia. It is located near Stankovci, connected by the D27 highway.
