= D533 road =

Former road in Croatia

D533 state road

Route information
- Length: 8.0 km (5.0 mi)
- Existed: June 26, 2005–2012

Major junctions
- From: D33 near Lozovac
- A1 in Šibenik interchange
- To: D8 near Šibenik

Location
- Country: Croatia
- Counties: Šibenik-Knin
- Major cities: Šibenik

Highway system
- Highways in Croatia

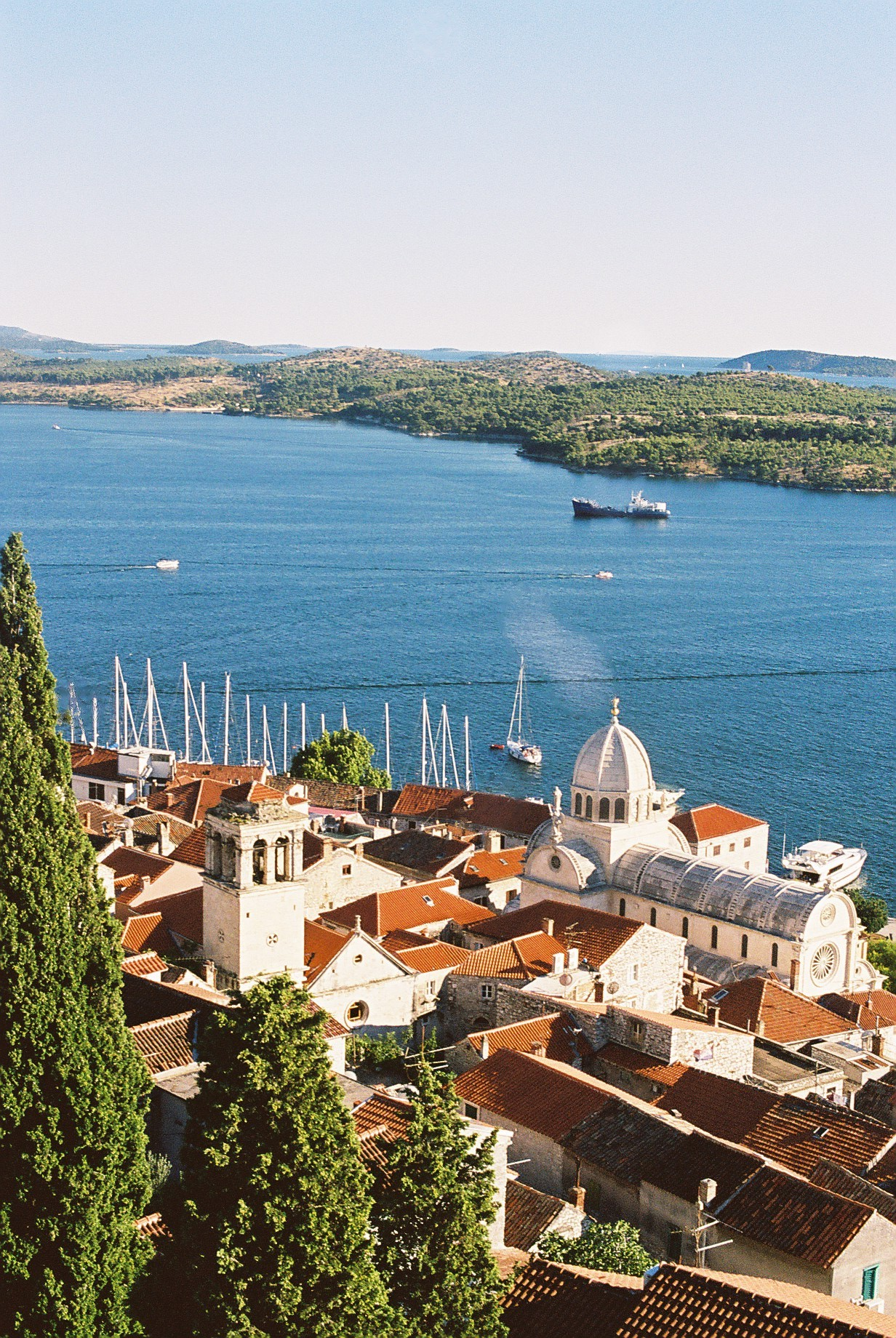
Šibenik, at the southern terminus of the D533 road

D533 was a state road that connected the city of Šibenik and A1 motorway in Šibenik interchange to D33 state road. The part of the road between Šibenik and A1 motorway was opened on June 26, 2005, while the part between A1 motorway and D33 state road was opened in 2007. The road was abolished and merged with D33 in 2012. The road was 8.0 km long.

All D533 road junctions except for its northern terminus (north of A1) were grade separated. The D533 was executed as a single-carriageway, two-lane expressway with a speed limit of 80 km/h (50 mph).

The road, as well as all other state roads in Croatia, was managed and maintained by Hrvatske ceste, state owned company.

== Traffic volume ==
Traffic is regularly counted and reported by Hrvatske ceste, operator of the road. Substantial variations between annual (AADT) and summer (ASDT) traffic volumes are attributed to the fact that the road serves as a connection of the city of Šibenik and several tourist resorts to the Croatian motorway network.

D533 traffic volume
Road	Counting site	AADT	ASDT	Notes
D533	5322 Dubrava Šibenska	7,532	12,011	Between Ž6091 and D8 junctions.

== Road junctions and populated areas ==
D533 junctions
Type	Slip roads/Notes
	D33 to Šibenik ferry port (to the southwest) and to Drniš and Knin (to the northeast). The northern terminus of the road.
	A1 in Šibenik interchange, to Gospić and Zagreb (to the north) and to Split and Ploče (to the south).
	Dubrava interchange Ž6091 to D33 in Bilice (to the west) Danilo Gornje and Sitno Donje (to the east).
	The southern terminus of single-carriageway, two-lane expressway.
	Vidici interchange in Šibenik; D8 to Vodice and Biograd na Moru (to the west) and Trogir (to the east). The southern terminus of the road.

== See also ==
- State roads in Croatia
- Hrvatske ceste
