= Ivan Ivanović =

Ivan Ivanović may refer to:

- Ivan Rikard Ivanović (1880–1949), Croatian politician
- Ivan Ivanović (writer) (born 1936), Serbian writer, nominated for the 1994 NIN Award
- Ivan Ivanović (host) (born 1975), Serbian television host of Veče sa Ivanom Ivanovićem
- Ivan Ivanović (rapper) (born 1981), or Juice, Serbian rapper
- Ivan Ivanović (footballer, born 1988), Serbian footballer who played in the 2007–08 Serbian Cup
- Ivan Ivanović (footballer) (born 1989), Montenegrin footballer
