= D502 road =

Road in Croatia

D502 state road

Route information
- Length: 16.4 km (10.2 mi)

Major junctions
- From: D27 in Karin
- D56 in Smilčić; D424 near Zemunik Gornji
- To: Zemunik Donji

Location
- Country: Croatia
- Counties: Zadar

Highway system
- Highways in Croatia

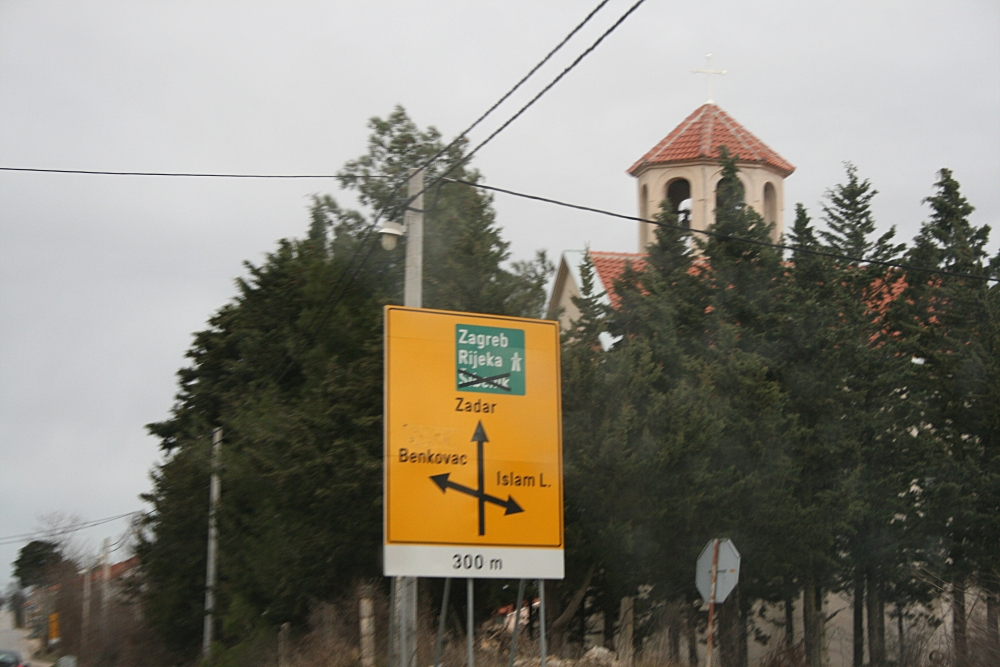
D502 intersection in Smilčić

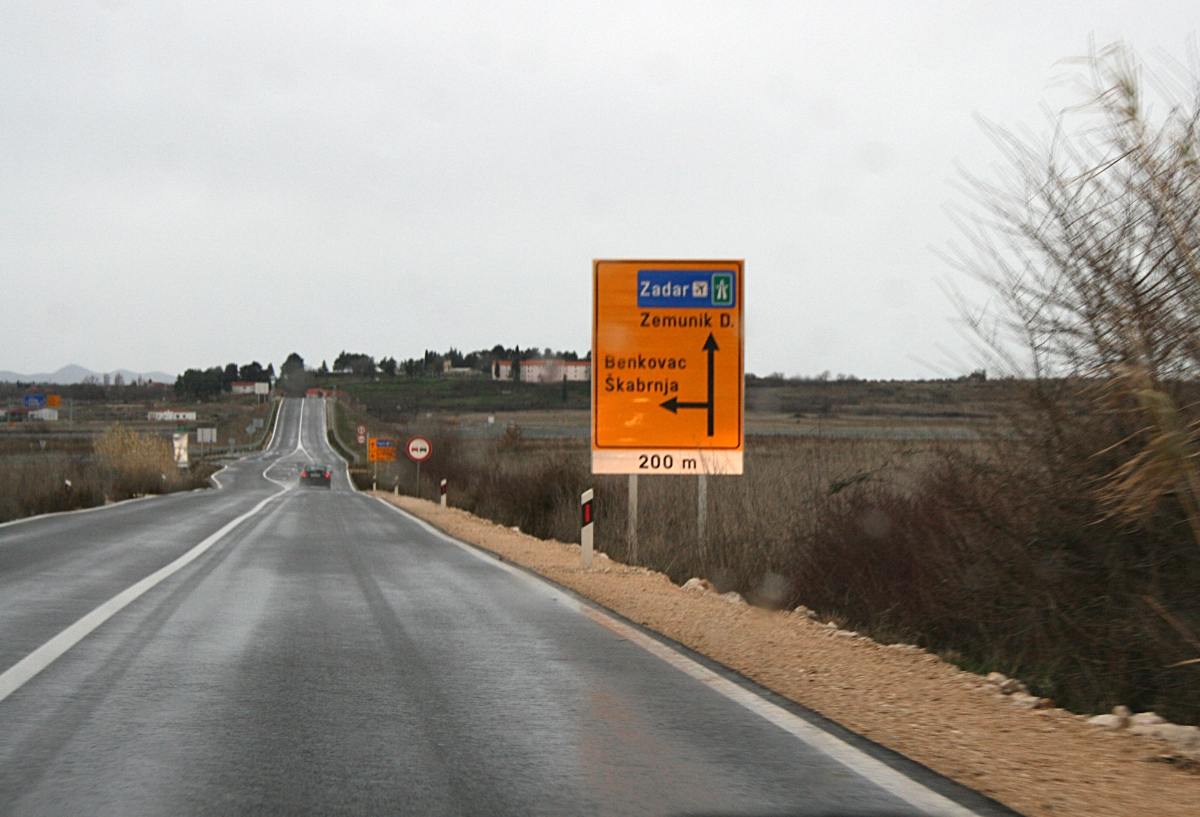
Approach to Zemunik Donji

D502 is a state road connecting D27 state road and the D424 expressway Tromilja interchange to a number of settlements in Zadar hinterland and A1 motorway Zadar 2 interchange (via D424). The road is 16.4 km (10.2 mi) long.

D502 is a connecting route providing a bypass of A1 motorway Maslenica Bridge and D8 state road Maslenica Bridge in case of strong winds.

Originally the road extended to Zadar itself, however in April 2010, the road was shortened in order to cancel the existing intersection with the Zadar Airport runway. The intersection used to be guarded by traffic signs and barriers similar to the ones found near at-grade railroad crossings.

The road, as well as all other state roads in Croatia, is managed and maintained by Hrvatske ceste, state owned company.

== Traffic volume ==
Traffic is regularly counted and reported by Hrvatske ceste, operator of the road. Substantial variations between annual (AADT) and summer (ASDT) traffic volumes are attributed to the fact that the road carries substantial tourist traffic in Zadar area.

D502 traffic volume
Road	Counting site	AADT	ASDT	Notes
D502	4924 Smilčić east	2,205	3,191	Between Ž6019 and Ž6023 junctions.

== Road junctions and populated areas ==
D502 junctions/populated areas
Type	Slip roads/Notes
	Karin; D27 to Gračac and Benkovac. The northern terminus of the road.
	Ž6019 to Pridraga, Novigrad and Posedarje
	Smilčić; D56 to Benkovac. Ž6023 to Gornje Biljane.
	Zemunik Gornji
	D424 expressway in Tromilja interchange - providing access to Zadar and A1 motorway Zadar 2 interchange.
	Zemunik Donji; The southern terminus of the road.
