= Smilčić =

Coordinates: 44°07′N 15°30′E

- Village
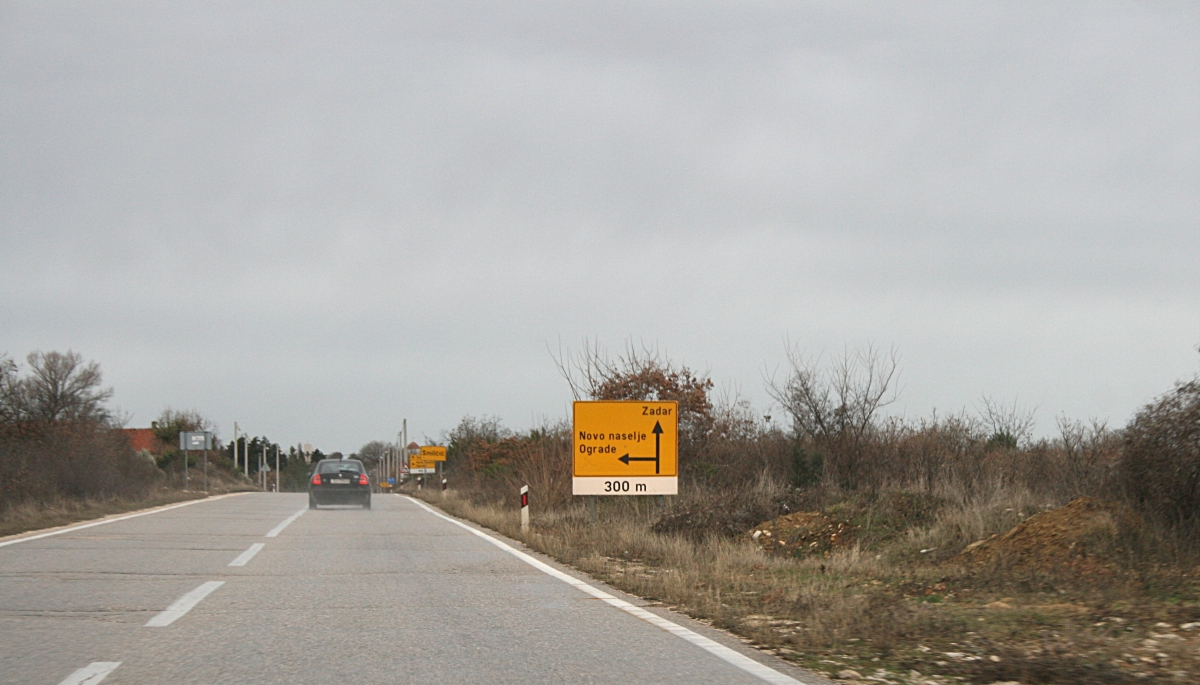
- Interactive map of Smilčić
- Country: Croatia
- County: Zadar County
- Municipality: Benkovac

Area
  - Total: 8.3 km^{2} (3.2 sq mi)

Population (2021)
  - Total: 235
  - Density: 28/km^{2} (73/sq mi)
- Time zone: UTC+1 (CET)
  - Summer (DST): UTC+2 (CEST)

Smilčić is a village in Croatia. It is connected by the D502 highway.
