= Gaženica =

- Suburb
- Location within Croatia
- Coordinates: 44°06′N 15°15′E
- Country: Croatia
- County: Zadar County
- Municipality: Zadar
- Time zone: UTC+1 (CET)
  - Summer (DST): UTC+2 (CEST)

Gaženica is a suburb of Zadar, Croatia, located about 3 miles southeast from the city center, by the Adriatic Sea. It is connected by the D424 highway.

== Port of Gaženica ==
Gaženica is location of the commercial port of the city of Zadar—Port of Gaženica. Port coordinates are 44° 05.0' N, 015° 16.0' E) The area is under a major redevelopment contracted to Austrian construction group Strabag, to be completed by 2013. Upon completion, the port will feature twelve piers: three for international lines, three for ro-ro ships and cruise ships, and six for the ships of the Croatian ferry lines.
