= D422 road =

Road in Croatia

D422 state road

Route information
- Length: 3.9 km (2.4 mi)

Major junctions
- From: D424 in Babindub interchange
- To: Zadar Airport

Location
- Country: Croatia
- Counties: Zadar

Highway system
- Highways in Croatia

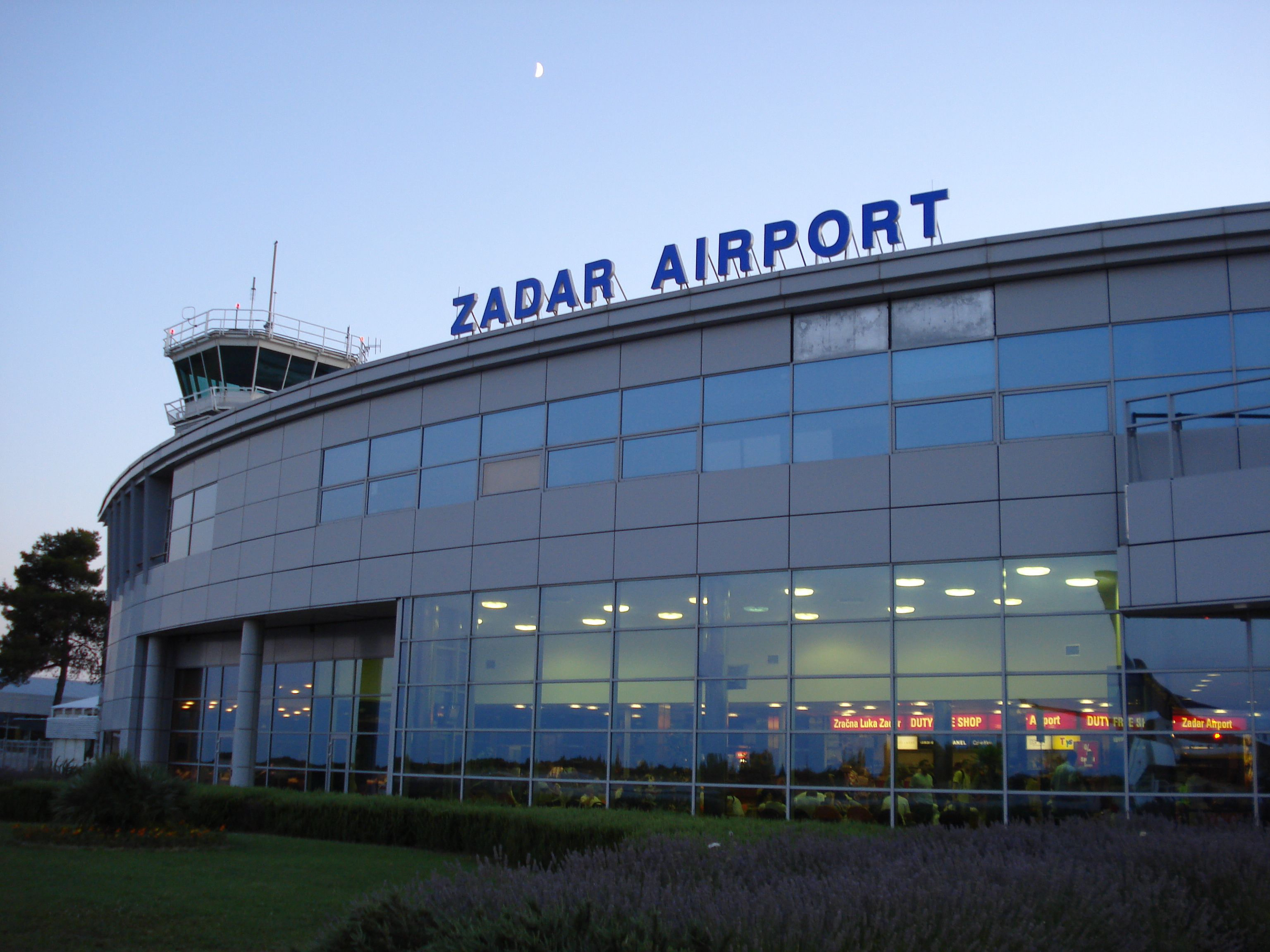
Zadar Airport

D422 is a state road branching off from D424 expressway connecting it to Zadar Airport. The road is 3.9 km long.

The road, as well as all other state roads in Croatia, is managed and maintained by Hrvatske ceste, state owned company.

== Road junctions ==
D422 junctions
Type	Slip roads/Notes
	D424 to Zadar (to the south) and to A1 motorway (to the north). Ž6039 to Bibinje. Ž6262 to Zadar via Benkovačka street. The southern terminus of the road.
	Zadar Airport - the northern terminus of the road.

== See also ==
- Zadar Airport
