= D27 road (Croatia) =

Road in Croatia

D27 state road

Route information
- Length: 96.9 km (60.2 mi)

Major junctions
- From: D1 in Gračac
- D50 in Gračac D54 in Zaton Obrovački; D502 in Donji Karin; D503 in Zapužane; A1 in Benkovac interchange D59 near Crljenik
- To: D8 near Šibenik

Location
- Country: Croatia
- Counties: Zadar, Šibenik-Knin
- Major cities: Benkovac, Obrovac

Highway system
- Highways in Croatia

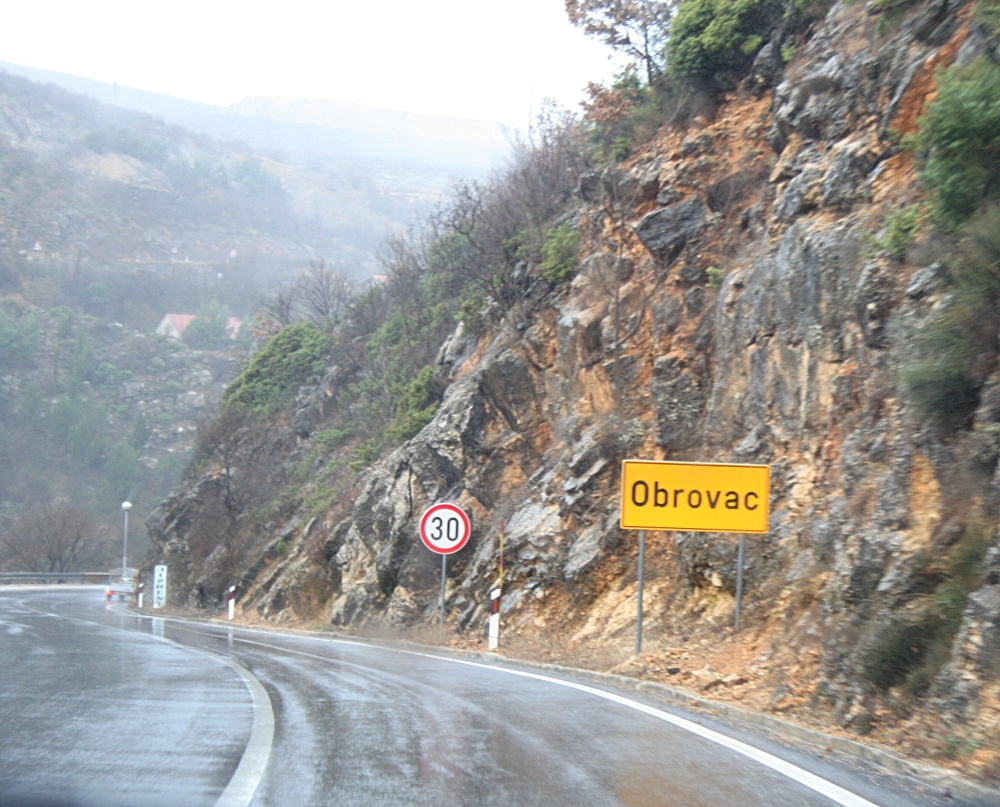
Entrance to Obrovac, on the D27 route

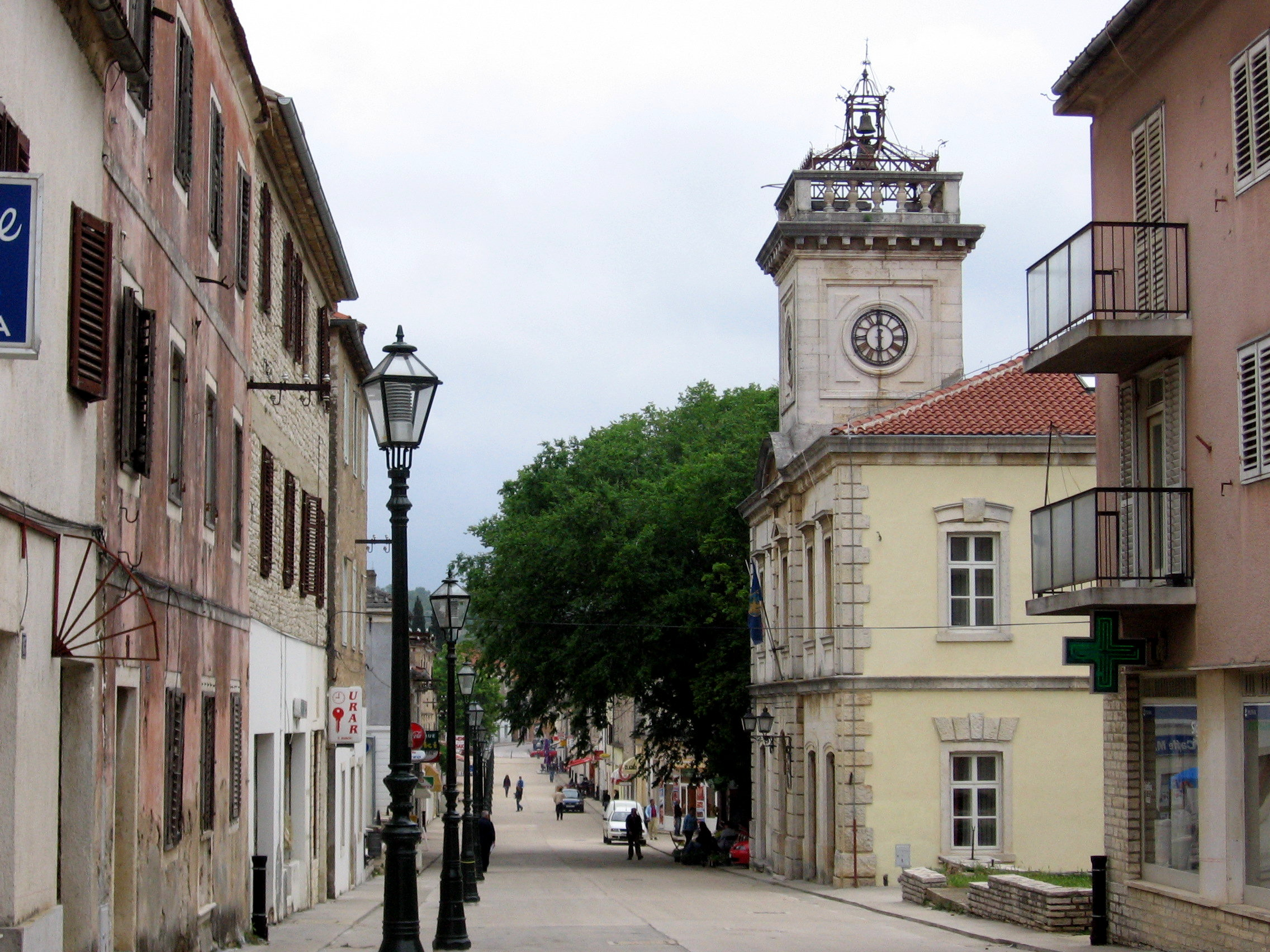
Benkovac, on the D27 route

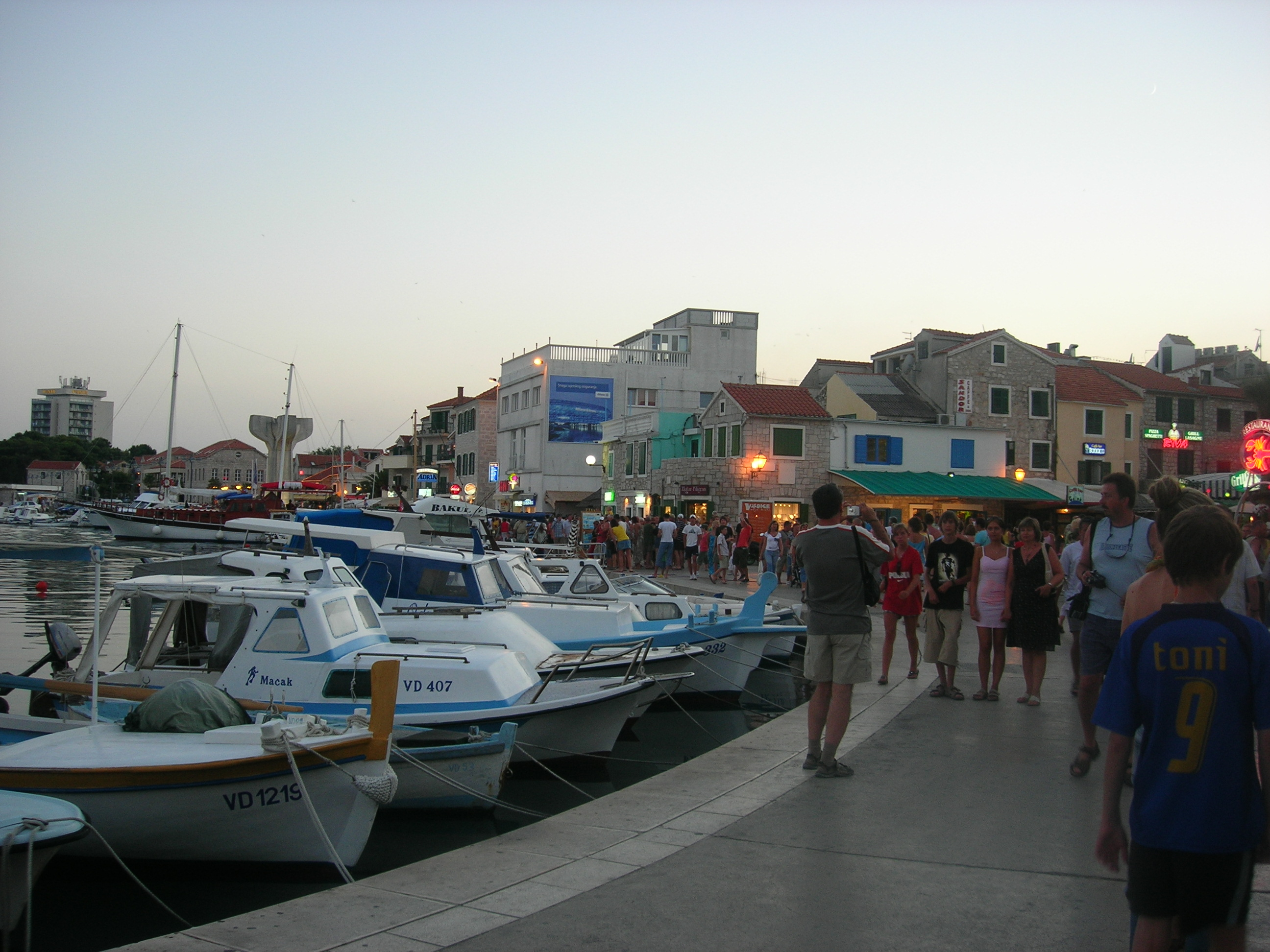
Vodice, just to the west of the southern terminus of D27

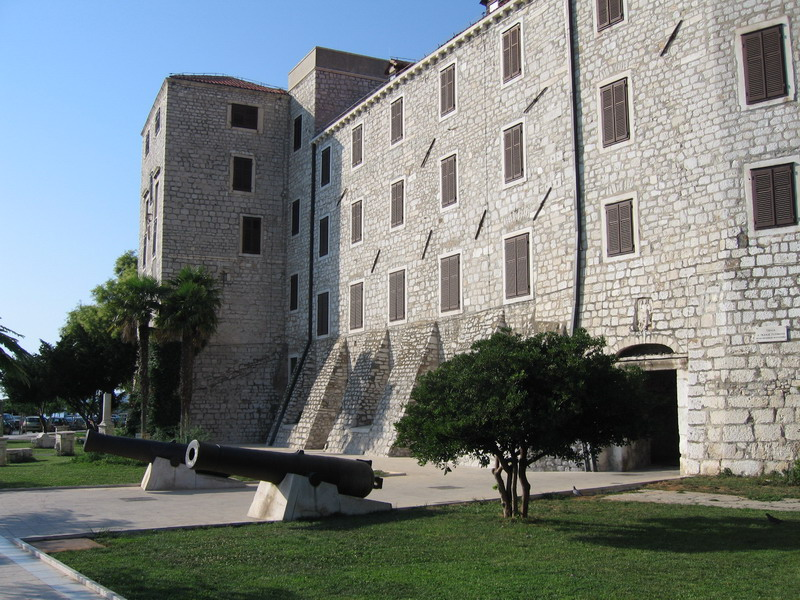
Šibenik, just to the east of the southern terminus of D27

D27 is a state road connecting Gračac in the southern part of Lika, Croatia, to D8 state road via Benkovac. The road is 96.9 kilometres (60.2 mi) long. It also provides an alternative route to the sections of A1 motorway and the D8 state road that cross the Maslenica strait over the two Maslenica bridges, underneath the Velebit. This is especially important when strong wind or storms (usually the bora) cause the A1 motorway section between Maslenica Bridge (A1) and Sveti Rok Tunnel to be closed for traffic for safety reasons.

The road, like all other state roads in Croatia, is managed and maintained by Hrvatske ceste, a state-owned company.

== Traffic volume ==
Traffic is regularly counted and reported by Hrvatske ceste, operator of the road. Substantial variations between annual (AADT) and summer (ASDT) traffic volumes are attributed to the fact that the road connects a number of summer resorts to Croatian motorway network.

D27 traffic volume
Road	Counting site	AADT	ASDT	Notes
D27	4912 Zaton Obrovački	1,214	2,382	Between Ž6027 and Ž6028 junctions.
D27	4914 Kruševo	1,864	2,987	Adjacent to Ž6025 junction.
D27	4915 Benkovac	1,387	2,528	Adjacent to Ž6045 junction.
D27	5317 Gornje Ceranje	1,530	2,078	Between Ž6064 and Ž6066 junctions.
D27	5303 Gaćelezi	2,118	3,585	Between D59 and Ž6071 junctions.

== Road junctions and populated areas ==
D27 junctions/populated areas
Type	Slip roads/Notes
	Gračac; D1 to Knin (to the south) and Korenica (to the north). The northern terminus of the road. Northbound D27 traffic defaults to northbound D1. D50 to A1 motorway Sveti Rok interchange.
	Ž6027 to Kaštel Žegarski and Bruška.
	Ž6028 to Muškovci.
	Zaton Obrovački; D54 to Maslenica and D8 state road.
	Obrovac; Ž6025 to Kaštel Žegarski, Ervenik and Kom. D547 to Sveti Rok
	Ž6024 to Kruševo.
	Gornji Karin
	Donji Karin; D502 to Smilčić, Zemunik Donji and D424 expressway Tromilja interchange.
	Ž6048 to Donji Karin and Popovići.
	Benkovac; Ž6003 within the town. Ž6278 to Zemunik Donji (to the north) and to Skradin (to the south).
	Šopot; 6064 to Miranje, Vrana and Pakoštane.
	Zapužane; D503 to Biograd na Moru.
	A1 Benkovac interchange (via a connector) to Zagreb and Zadar to the north and to Šibenik and Split to the south.
	Miranje; 6064 to Šopot (to the north) and Vrana and Pakoštane (to the south).
	Pristeg
	LC63145 to Dobra Voda and Radašinovci
	Budak
	Stankovci; Ž6067 to Bila Vlaka and Vukšić; Ž6068 to Kašić Banjevački and Pirovac (D8).
	Crljenik
	D59 to Pirovac (to the west) (D8) and Knin (to the east) (D1).
	Grabovci
	Gaćelezi; Ž6071 to D59 state road (as a connector).
	Ž6086 to Tribunj.
	D8 to Vodice (to the west) and to Šibenik (to the east). The southern terminus of the road.

== See also ==
- Highways in Croatia
