= D424 road =

Road in Croatia

D424 state road
- Brza cesta Zadar 2 - Gaženica

Route information
- Length: 17.6 km (10.9 mi)

Major junctions
- From: Gaženica, Zadar
- To: A1 Zadar 2 interchange

Location
- Country: Croatia
- Counties: Zadar
- Major cities: Zadar

Highway system
- Highways in Croatia

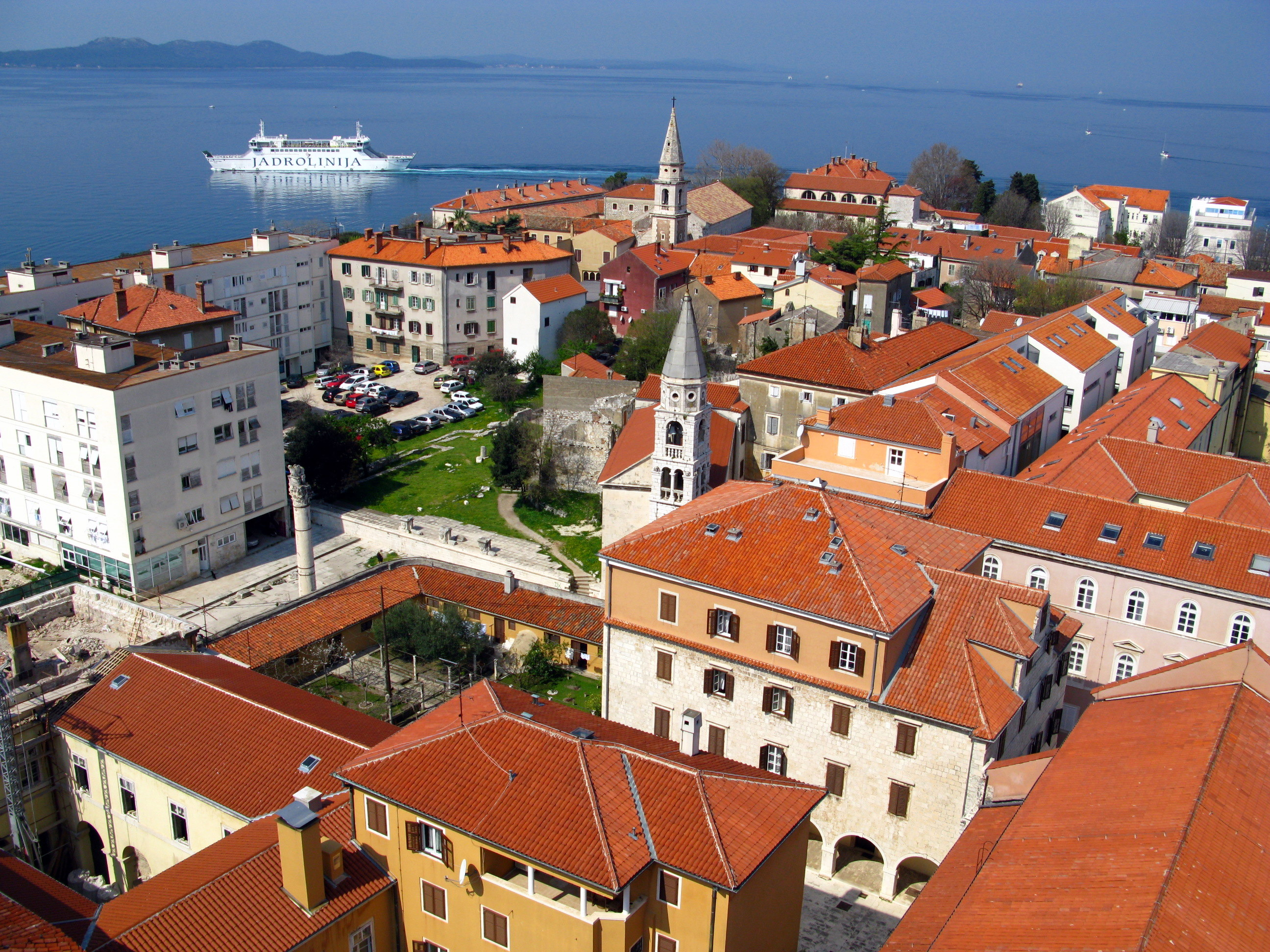
Zadar, at the southern terminus of the D424 road

D424 is a state road in Croatia that connects the city of Zadar with the A1 motorway. It links Gaženica port in southern Zadar and Zadar 2 interchange on A1 motorway, executed as a dual carriage expressway (Croatian: brza cesta) connector, with an 80 km/h (50 mph) speed limit. The D424 has five interchanges. Together with the new Gaženica port and the Crno commercial zone, the expressway is expected to bring prosperity to Zadar.

The road, as well as all other state roads in Croatia, is managed and maintained by Hrvatske ceste, state-owned company.

== Traffic volume ==
Traffic is regularly counted and reported by Hrvatske ceste, operator of the road. Substantial variations between annual (AADT) and summer (ASDT) traffic volumes are attributed to the fact that the road connects a number of summer resorts to the Croatian motorway network.

D424 traffic volume
Road	Counting site	AADT	ASDT	Notes
D424	4820 Gaženica	5,445	7,686	Between D8 and D422 junctions.

== Road junctions and populated areas ==
D424 exit list
Type	Slip roads/Notes
	A1 - Interchange with A1 motorway in Zadar 2 interchange. Northern terminus of the road.
	Zadar 2 toll plaza. A part of A1 motorway toll system.
	Northern terminus of dual carriageway expressway to Zadar and Gaženica.
	Tromilja interchange D56 to Benkovac; D502 to Karin and D27; D56 and D502 roads are concurrent between the interchange and a junction approximately 700 m (2,300 ft) to the north
	Sveti Martin interchange Ž6040 to Sukošan
	Babindub interchange D422 to Zadar Airport; Ž6039 to Bibinje; Ž6262 to Zadar via Benkovačka street.
	Gaženica interchange D8 to Zadar city centre.
	Southern terminus of dual carriageway expressway to Zadar and A1 motorway.
	Port of Zadar (Gaženica).
