= Vane Ivanović =

Yugoslav athlete and diplomat

British Consul General of Monaco

Personal details
- Born: 9 June 1913 Osijek, Kingdom of Croatia-Slavonia, Austria-Hungary
- Died: 4 April 1999 (aged 85)
- Education: Westminster School; Peterhouse, Cambridge
- Sports career
- Height: 188 cm (6 ft 2 in)
- Weight: 83 kg (183 lb)
- Sport: Athletics
- Event: hurdles
- Club: University of Cambridge AC; Achilles Club; HŠK Concordia, Zagreb

Ivan "Vane" Stefan Ivanović (9 June 1913 – 4 April 1999) was a Yugoslav-British athlete, shipowner, political activist, diplomat, writer and philanthropist. One of the founders of the European Movement and the consul general of Monaco in London, he devoted most of his life to the idea of Yugoslav unity.

== Background ==
Vane Ivanović was born in 1913 in Osijek, Austria-Hungary to a Jewish Croat father and a Serb mother. His father, Ivan Rikard Ivanović, was originally born with the surname Kraus but like so many Jewish families feeling persecuted by the Austro-Hungarian Empire, they changed their name and converted to Catholicism. Ivan Rikard subsequently became a representative in Croatia's Parliament. His mother, Milica (b. 26 February 1888) was a sister of Dušan Popović, a leading Serb politician in the ruling Croat-Serb Coalition. Svetozar Pribićević, the other leading Serb in the Coalition, was the best man at Rikard and Milica's wedding in July 1912, while Ivan Lorković, member of Ivan Rikard Ivanović's party and the leading Croat in the Coalition, was Ivanović's godfather. Ivanović had a younger brother, Vladimir, born 1917, and a younger sister, Daška, born in 1915.

Whereas his family background clearly contributed to the development of Ivanović's strong Yugoslav identity, his life in Britain and the education he received there at Westminster School and at Peterhouse, Cambridge (where he read economics) made him a staunch Anglophile. A rather dandyish figure who often supported an impressive cigar, Ivanović appeared to Serbs and Croats an English gentleman who spoke a slightly archaic Croat; to the British he was considered a no less exotic 'Eastern gentleman'. Despite spending much time in Britain, Ivanović never sought to be naturalised. Although he did not hold a Yugoslav passport, he chose to remained stateless until he could become a citizen of the Republic of Croatia in 1990.

== Sports ==
A well-known athlete, Ivanović was a member of the Yugoslav team at the 1936 Summer Olympics held in Berlin, running the 110-metre and 400-metre hurdles. He was the undisputed Yugoslav champion in both disciplines throughout the 1930s. At the event, he was among the number of athletes who refused to give Hitler the Nazi salute. In 110m he reached the semi-finals in Berlin and in 400m hurdles he held the Yugoslav record for 17 years, from 1936 until 1953.

Ivanović maintained his love of sport throughout his life. His only concession to age (in his 80s) was to cut back his runs around Hyde Park to alternate days. He was also an avid scuba diver. One of the pioneers of the sport, he contributed greatly to its development in Europe and the Bahamas. He wrote a number of books on spearfishing, of which one in particular, Modern Spearfishing (1974), remains a classic among diving enthusiasts.

== Shipping ==
After his parents' divorce in the early 1920s, Ivanović's mother remarried Božidar "Božo" Banac in London on 9 November 1921. Banac lived in London where he ran a shipping business, Jugoslovenski Lloyd, Ltd., (Yugoslav Lloyd), then Yugoslavia's largest shipping company which operated vessels in the Atlantic, Adriatic and Mediterranean waters. Ivanović and his siblings then moved in with their new stepfather. Banac, a native of Dubrovnik and a believer in Yugoslav unity, had helped the creation and activities of the Yugoslav Committee, a group of Croat, Slovene and Serb politicians and intellectuals also based in London. In 1937 he was made director of his stepfather's company.

== World War II ==
In 1914, Banac had placed his ships at the disposal of the British war effort. The family did the same at the outbreak of World War II, when Ivanović, acting on behalf of his then ailing stepfather, placed 10 out of the 22 steamers owned by Yugoslav Lloyd in the service of the Ministry of War Transport. Thus, Banac and Ivanović were the first shipowners from a neutral country to join the Allies.

After the invasion of Yugoslavia by Germany, Italy, and their external and internal allies in April 1941, Ivanović organized other Yugoslav shipowners into the "Yugoslav Shipping Committee". Their aim was to prevent the capture of the Yugoslav mercantile fleet, still in neutral waters, by the Nazis.

In the summer of 1943, Ivanović joined the Yugoslav section of the Political Warfare Executive (PWE) the propaganda arm of Britain's Special Operations Executive. Even though most of the fleet of Yugoslav Lloyd had either been sunk or captured by this point, there were still enough independently owned Yugoslavian ships participating in the Allied effort under flags of convenience.

In his memoirs, Ivanović explained why he did not return to his occupied country to join Josip Broz Tito's or Draža Mihailović's resistance movements: "I had no desire to forget the enemy and engage in a fratricidal war among my fellow countrymen, especially as I did not wholly agree with either side." He spent the rest of the war between London, Bari and Cairo and was eventually demobilized as a Major in the British army. Because of the Communist seizure of power in Yugoslavia, he remained in Britain as a political refugee. In April 1945, Božidar "Božo" Banac, Ivanović's stepfather died.

== Post-war years ==
After the war, and despite the fact that most of his pre-war fleet had been either destroyed or nationalized by the new Yugoslav authorities, Ivanović resumed a successful career in shipping.

In February 1949 Ivanović's biological father died in Genoa-Quinto, Italy. That same year his sister was remarried to Lt. Col. Neil McLean, DSO, who had also been a member of Special Operations Executive during the war. That same year Ivanović founded the "Benevolent Association of Free Citizens of Yugoslavia", a charity financed mainly by himself. Through this organization and as a private individual he helped innumerable refugees, students, artists and political dissidents escape Tito's dictatorship.

During the Cold War years, along with other like-minded Yugoslavs, Ivanović organized many discussions about the fate of his homeland, which led to the two-volume collection "A Democratic Alternative", published in 1963, which warned that the establishment of independent states in the Balkans would spawn 'fatal conflicts'. Ivanović would continue to help his fellow countrymen right up until his death, sponsoring a number of postgraduate students who fled the 1990s conflict in Yugoslavia, and was also one of the founders of Jean Monnet's European Movement, heading the Yugoslav Committee for more than three decades.

In 1967, Ivanović was appointed by Prince Rainier III to the post of consul general of Monaco in London. His mother, Milica, subsequently moved there permanently and died in Monaco three years later. In 1977, he published his auto-biography entitled: LX, Memoirs of a Jugoslav.

In 1982, the final memorandum of the "Democratic Alternative" argued that Yugoslavia could only survive as a democratic community of sovereign nations, and that any other scenario would almost inevitably lead to a civil war. Ivanović lived long enough to witness the awful fulfillment of this prophecy with the outbreak of the Yugoslav wars. In 1990 Ivanović became a citizen of the Republic of Croatia. He died in London on 4 April 1999. His father liked to point out that Ivanović was the first Yugoslav in the family. Born on the eve of unification, he died as its last remnants collapsed.

In October 1939 Ivanović married June Fisher with whom he had two sons, Ivan Božidar ("Božo") and Andrija; and one daughter, Minja. His son Božo succeeded him as director of Ivanovic & Co. and as Consul of Monaco upon his death.

== Bibliography ==
- Submarine Spearfishing by Vane Ivanović (Kaye-Ward, London, 1951)
- Meštrović Genij by Vane Ivanović (Essay, Notre-Dame Archives, Indiana 1962)
- Democratic Yugoslavia: Vol. 1: An Outline for Discussion by Vane Ivanović (Izvor, 1968)
- Democratic Yugoslavia: Vol. 2: An Outline for Discussion by Vane Ivanović (Izvor, 1972)
- Modern Spearfishing by Vane Ivanović (Kaye-Ward, London, 1974)
- LX, Memoirs of a Jugoslav by Vane Ivanović (Harcourt Brace Jovanovich, London, 1977)
- Yugoslav Democracy on Hold by Vane Ivanović (Dodir, London, 1996)

Diplomatic posts
Preceded by Sir Christopher Soames	List of Consuls General from the United Kingdom to Monaco; 1967–1999	Succeeded by Ivan Božidar Ivanović
