= Ivan Rikard Ivanović =

Croatian industrialist and politician

Elected Deputy for Osijek II

Personal details
- Born: Ivan Rikard Mendel Kraus; 1880 Osijek, Austro-Hungarian Empire (now Croatia)
- Died: 1949 (aged 69) Genoa, Italy
- Spouse: Milica Popović
- Children: 3, including Daška and Vane
- Occupation: Politician, industrialist

Ivan Rikard Ivanović (born Ivan Rikard Mendel Kraus; 1880–1949) was a Croatian industrialist, politician and one of the founders of the Croatian National Progressive Party (NNS).

== Life and career ==
Ivan Rikard Mendel Kraus was born in 1880 in Osijek, Kingdom of Croatia-Slavonia, Austria-Hungary, the son of Bettina and Johann Kraus. His father was the owner of a construction business in Osijek, and was responsible for erecting a number of buildings in his hometown, among which was the first steam-powered flour mill. When Ivan was a young boy his parents changed the family name to Ivanović and converted to Catholicism, along with many other Jews at the time.

After completing his early studies his parents sent him to Vienna where he became a Doctor of Law. In 1905 he became one of the founders of the Croatian National Progressive Party (Hrvatska narodna napredna stranka, NNS). In the 1908 Croatian parliamentary election, Ivanović was elected a member of the Croatian Parliament for the city of Osijek. In July 1912, he married Milica Popović, the youngest sister of Dr Dušan Popović, a leading Serb in Croatian political life. He was also elected in the 1913 Croatian parliamentary election.

In 1918, as a member of the National Assembly of Serbs, Croats, and Slovenes he helped to form the state.

In 1929, Ivanović built an oil refinery in Osijek named "IPOIL". In 1936, he started building the first aluminum factory in the Balkans in the town of Lozovac near Šibenik, consulted by Elektrokemisk, now known as "IVANAL" d.d.

During the Second World War he was arrested and imprisoned for three years. His first factory, IPOIL, was confiscated by the Independent State of Croatia. His second factory, IVANAL, was confiscated by the Italian occupying forces. In 1946, the Communists accused him of being a "capitalist bourgeois" and in a plotted political process, the Supreme Court of Croatia in Zagreb (case No. K-645/45 of 9 January) condemned both him and his wife and confiscated all the property of the company, including all the immovables and factory buildings. Ivanović was stripped of his civil rights and sent to a forced labor camp. After being released, he fled to Italy where he died in Genoa in 1949 aged 68.

He and Milica Popović had three children together, Ivan, Daška and Vladimir. He had a third son named Dimitar with his second wife Jelka Muačević. In 1948, his third wife, Štefica Kastelic, gave birth to his fourth son, Marko, who became his legal successor.

His granddaughter is socialite Tessa Kennedy and his great-grandchildren include actor Cary Elwes and producer Cassian Elwes.
