= 1913 Croatian parliamentary election =

- 16–17 December 1913

88 seats in the Sabor
- Turnout: 53.27%
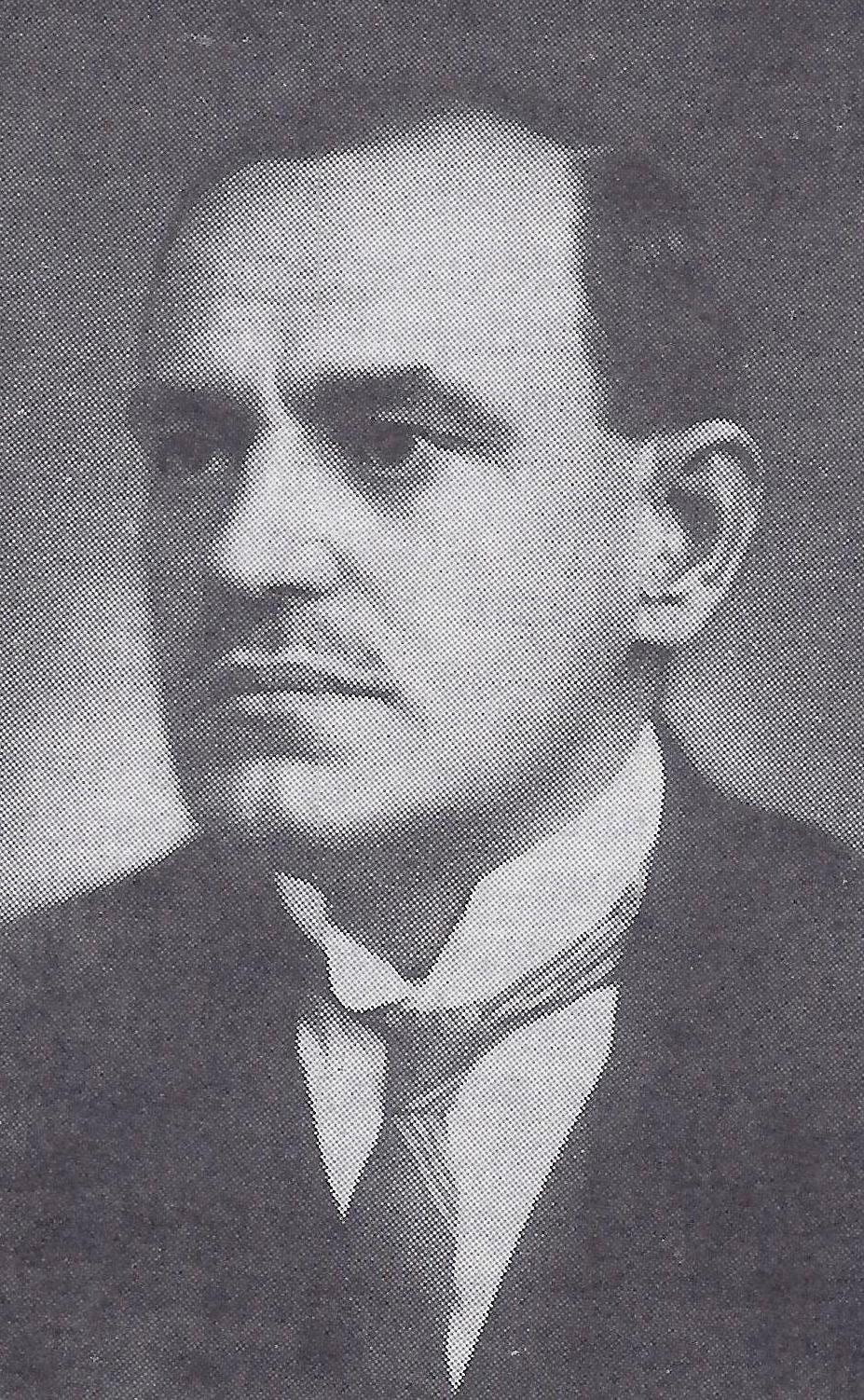

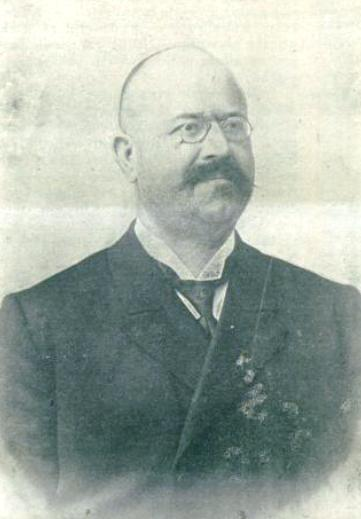

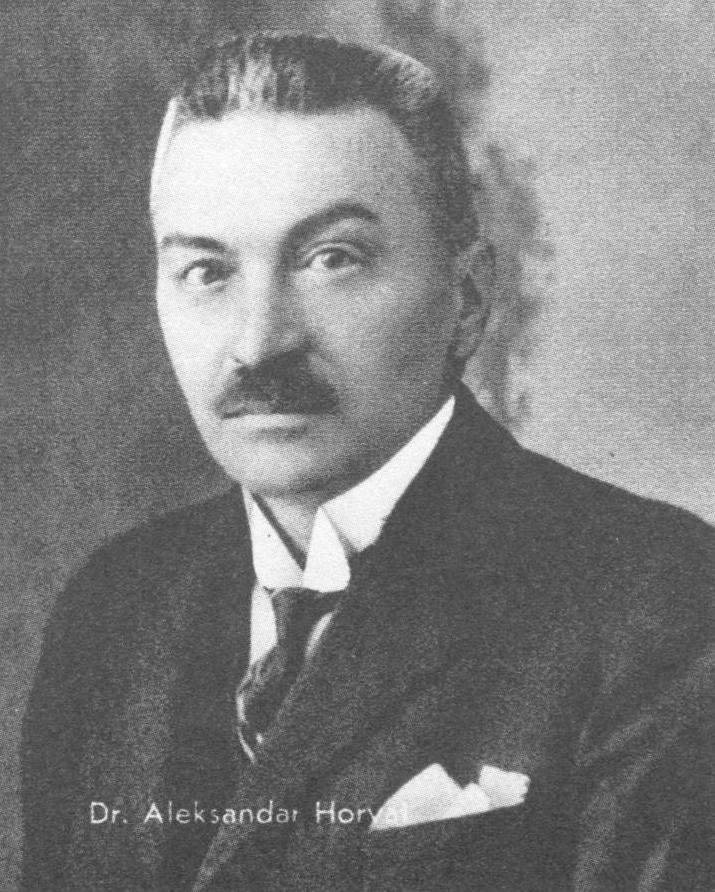
| | First party | Second party | Third party |
|---|---|---|---|
| Leader | Svetozar Pribićević | Mile Starčević | Aleksandar Horvat |
| Party | Croat-Serb Coalition | Milinovci | Frankists |
| Seats won | 48 / 88 | 14 / 88 | 9 / 88 |
| Popular vote | 43,645 | 17,522 | 15,834 |
| Percentage | 39.09% | 15.69% | 14.18% |
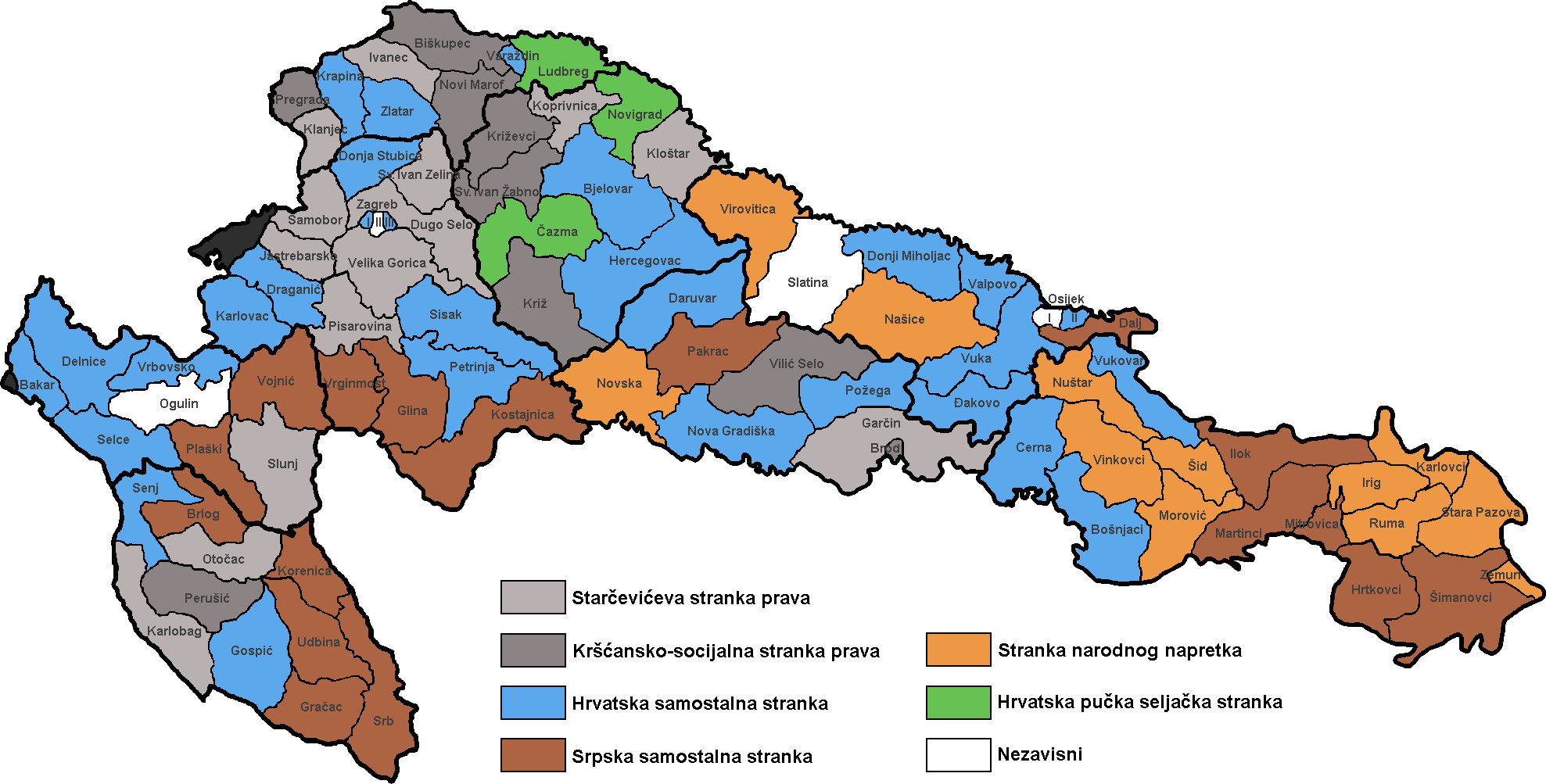
- Results of the election in each of the electoral districts in 8 counties of the Kingdom of Croatia-Slavonia: the party with the plurality of votes in each district. Milinovci Frankists; Croatian Independent Party Serb Independent Party Unionists Croatian Peoples' Peasant Party Independent

Parliamentary elections were held in the Kingdom of Croatia-Slavonia on 16 and 17 December 1913. There were 209,618 eligible male voters. According to the census of December 31, 1910, the Kingdom of Croatia-Slavonia had a population of 2,621,954.

The Croatian parliament had been dissolved by ban Slavko Cuvaj on 27 January 1912. On April 4 Cuvaj suspended the constitution and the following day was proclaimed commissioner of the Kingdom. Over the course of the following year two assassination attempts were made on Cuvaj, leading to his withdrawal as commissioner. Ivan Skerlecz was proclaimed ban on November 27, 1913 and called elections for 16 and 17 December.

== Results ==
| Party or alliance | | Votes | % | Seats |
|---|---|---|---|---|
| Croat-Serb Coalition | Croatian Independent Party | 30,343 | 27.18 | 29 |
| Croat-Serb Coalition | Serb Independent Party | 11,704 | 10.48 | 17 |
| Croat-Serb Coalition | Independents | 1,598 | 1.43 | 2 |
| Croat-Serb Coalition | Total | 43,645 | 39.09 | 48 |
| Frankists | | 15,834 | 14.18 | 9 |
| Independent Unionists and Old Magyarons | | 15,616 | 13.99 | 12 |
| Milinovci | | 14,446 | 12.94 | 11 |
| Croatian Peoples' Peasant Party | | 13,024 | 11.66 | 3 |
| Serb People's Radical Party | | 3,234 | 2.90 | 0 |
| Independent Rightsists | | 3,076 | 2.75 | 3 |
| Independent Parliamentary Club/Osijek Group | | 2,153 | 1.93 | 2 |
| Social Democratic Party of Croatia and Slavonia | | 626 | 0.56 | 0 |
| Total | | 111,654 | 100.00 | 88 |
| Registered voters/turnout | | 209,618 | – | |

=== Elected representatives ===
| Constituency | Elected Deputy | Party |
|---|---|---|
| Bakar | Makso Rošić | |
| Biškupec | Josip Milković | |
| Bjelovar | Josip Werklein | |
| Bošnjaci | Đuro Šurmin | Croatian Independent Party |
| Brlog | Srđan Budisavljević | |
| Brod | Vladimir Prebeg | Frankists |
| Cerna | Mirko Kutuzović | |
| Čazma | Vinko Lovreković | Croatian Peoples' Peasant Party |
| Dalj | Josif Rajačić | Serb Independent Party |
| Daruvar | Mijo Ettinger | |
| Delnice | Fran Serafin Križ | |
| Donja Stubica | Marko Novosel | |
| Donji Miholjac | Franjo Poljak | |
| Draganić | Gustav Modrušan | |
| Dugo Selo | Marko Mileusnić | |
| Đakovo | Ivan Ribar | Croatian Independent Party |
| Garčin | Dragutin Hrvoj | |
| Glina | Nikola Ercegovac | |
| Gospić | Vinko Krišković | |
| Gračac | Đuro Miščević | |
| Hercegovac | Većeslav Wilder | |
| Hrtkovci | Giga Jović | |
| Ilok | Gavro Manojlović | |
| Irig | Anatolije Janković | |
| Ivanec | Cezar Akačić | |
| Jastrebarsko | Vojislav Kempf | |
| Karlobag | Ivan Peršić | |
| Karlovac | Edmund Lukinić | |
| Karlovci | Lazar Sekulić | |
| Klanjec | Dragutin Hrvoj | |
| Kloštar | Petar Majer | |
| Koprivnica | Stjepan Zagorac | Milinovci |
| Korenica | Svetozar Pribićević | Serb Independent Party |
| Kostajnica | Dušan Peleš | Serb Independent Party |
| Krapina | Stjepan Cerovac | Croatian Independent Party |
| Križ | Ivo Frank | Frankists |
| Križevci | Fran Novak | Frankists |
| Ludbreg | Stjepan Radić | Croatian Peoples' Peasant Party |
| Martinci | Stevan Simeonović | Serb Independent Party |
| Mitrovica | Dušan Popović | Serb Independent Party |
| Morović | Svetislav Šumanović | Old Magyarons |
| Našice | Teodor Pejačević | Old Magyarons |
| Nova Gradiška | Hinko Hinković | Croatian Independent Party |
| Novigrad | Tomo Jalžabetić | Croatian Peoples' Peasant Party |
| Novi Marof | Aleksandar Horvat | Frankists |
| Novska | Josip Šilović | Old Magyarons |
| Nuštar | Mark Aurel Fodroczy | Old Magyarons |
| Ogulin | Vladimir Nikolić | Independent Parliamentary Group |
| Osijek I | Ante Pinterović | Osijek Group |
| Osijek II | Ivan Rikard Ivanović | Croatian Independent Party |
| Otočac | Živko Petričić | Milinovci |
| Pakrac | Milenko Marković | Serb Independent Party |
| Perušić | Stipe Vučetić | Frankists |
| Petrinja | Aleksandar Badaj | Croatian Independent Party |
| Pisarovina | Franjo Kufrin | Milinovci |
| Plaški | Bogdan Medaković | Serb Independent Party |
| Požega | Eduard Kürschner | Croatian Independent Party |
| Pregrada | Vuk Kiš | Frankists |
| Ruma | Marko Pejačević | Old Magyarons |
| Samobor | Ante Pavelić | Milinovci |
| Selce | Bogoslav Mažuranić | Croatian Independent Party |
| Senj | Guido Hreljanović | Croatian Independent Party |
| Sisak | Grga Tuškan | Croatian Independent Party |
| Slatina | Franjo Zbierchowski | Independent Parliamentary Group |
| Slunj | Mato Polić | Milinovci |
| Srb | Petar Krajnović | Serb Independent Party |
| Stara Pazova | Nikola Petrović | Old Magyarons |
| Sveti Ivan Zelina | Mile Starčević | Milinovci |
| Sveti Ivan Žabno | Stjepan Pavunić | Frankists |
| Šid | Vitomir Korać | Old Magyarons |
| Šimanovci | Svetislav Popović | Serb Independent Party |
| Udbina | Pajo Obradović | Serb Independent Party |
| Valpovo | Ivan Lorković | Croatian Independent Party |
| Varaždin | Ljubo Babić-Gjalski | Croatian Independent Party |
| Velika Gorica | Ivan Peršić | Milinovci |
| Vilić Selo | Ivan Zatluka | Frankists |
| Vinkovci | Stjepan Tropsch | Old Magyarons |
| Virovitica | Aladar Jankovich | Old Magyarons |
| Vojnić | Vaso Muačević | Serb Independent Party |
| Vrbovsko | Pero Magdić | Croatian Independent Party |
| Vrginmost | Bude Budisavljević | Serb Independent Party |
| Vuka | Antun Mihalovich | Croatian Independent Party |
| Vukovar | Ivan Paleček | Croatian Independent Party |
| Zagreb I | Đuro Šurmin | Croatian Independent Party |
| Zagreb II | Miroslav Kulmer | Croatian Independent Party |
| Zagreb III | Janko Holjac | Croatian Independent Party |
| Zemun | Aleksandar Rakodczay | Old Magyarons |
| Zlatar | Aurel Rauer | Croatian Independent Party |
