= D219 road =

Road in Croatia

D219 state road

Route information
- Length: 31.7 km (19.7 mi)

Major junctions
- From: D56 in Gornji Muć
- D1 in Sinj
- To: Bili Brig border crossing to Bosnia and Herzegovina

Location
- Country: Croatia
- Counties: Split-Dalmatia
- Major cities: Sinj

Highway system
- Highways in Croatia

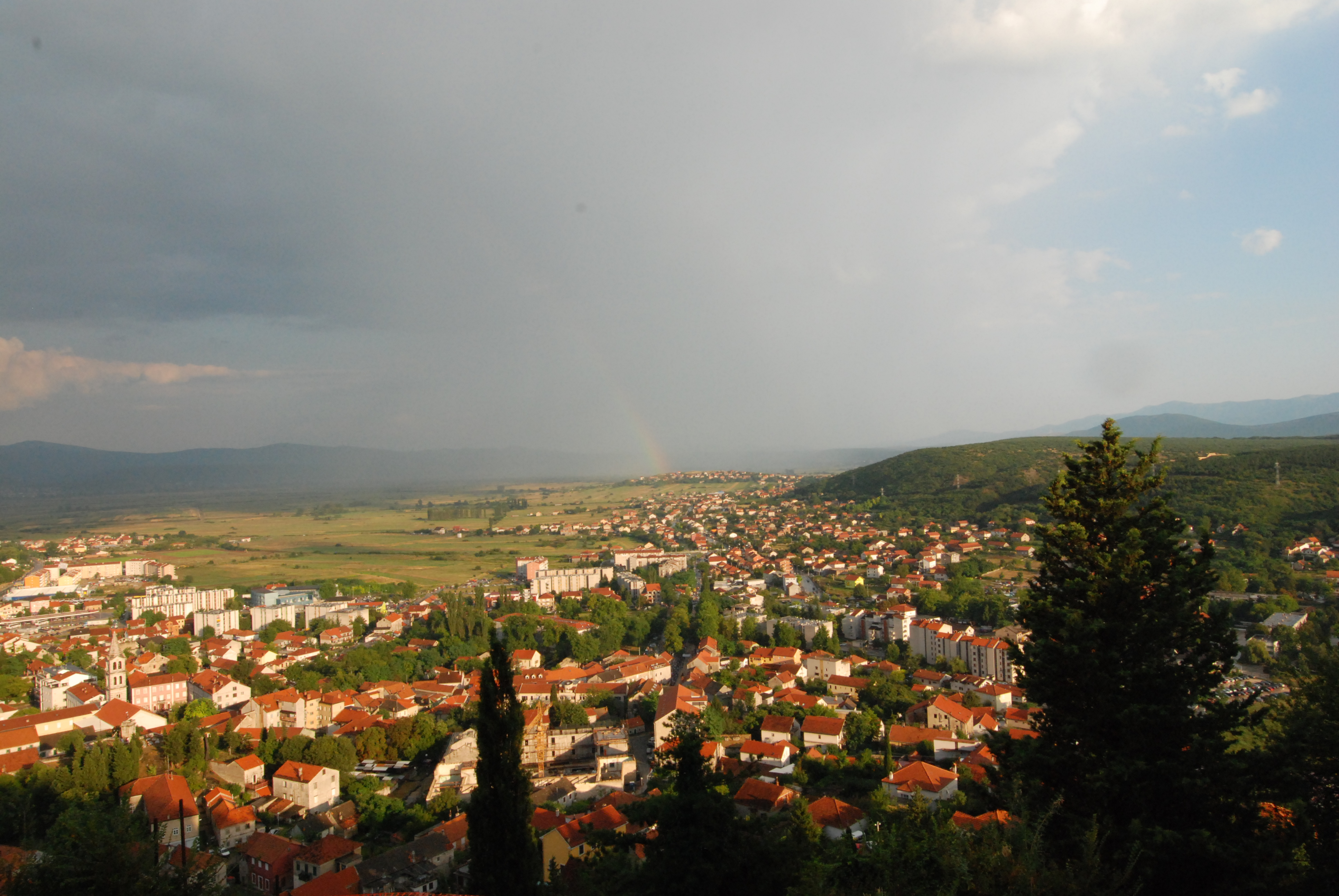
Sinj, on the D219 route

D219 is a state road in Dalmatia region of Croatia connecting D1 and D56 state roads to Bili Brig border crossing to Bosnia and Herzegovina. The road is 31.7 km (19.7 mi) long.

Like all state roads in Croatia, the D219 is also managed and maintained by Hrvatske ceste, state owned company.

== Traffic volume ==
Traffic is regularly counted and reported by Hrvatske ceste, operator of the road. Substantial variations between annual (AADT) and summer (ASDT) traffic volumes are attributed to tourist traffic carried to the D1 state road.

D219 traffic volume
Road	Counting site	AADT	ASDT	Notes
D219	5501 Obrovac Sinjski	452	520	Adjacent to the Ž6122 junction.
D219	5502 Progon - east	575	775	Adjacent to the D56 junction.

== Road junctions and populated areas ==
D219 junctions/populated areas
Type	Slip roads/Notes
	Gornji Muć; D56 to Klis and Drniš. The southern terminus of the road.
	Sutina
	Ž6117 to Lučane and Karakašica.
	Ž6051 to Kolarina.
	Sinj; D1 to Split and A1 motorway Dugopolje interchange (to the south) and to Knin (to the north).
	Obrovac Sinjski
	Ž6122 to Gljev.
	Bili Brig border crossing to Bosnia and Herzegovina. The northern terminus of the road. The route extends north towards Livno, Bosnia and Herzegovina.
