= Dušan Popović (1877–1958) =

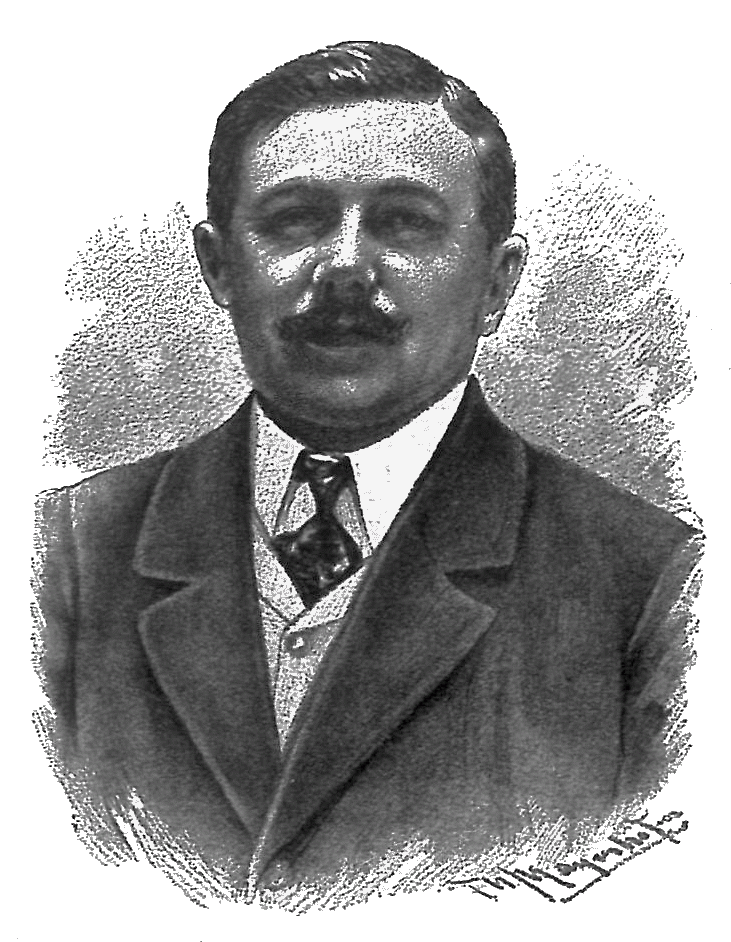
Popović pictured in Dom i sviet, 1907

Dušan Popović (1 October 1877 – 25 June 1958) was a lawyer and politician in Croatia. He was a leading member of the Croat-Serb coalition in the Croatian Parliament and a delegate to the Hungarian House of Representatives.

== Life ==
The son of a lawyer, Stevan Popović (1839–1912), by his marriage to Milica Bela Nikolajević, Popović was born in Ruma, in the Srem District of the Vojvodina, educated at a high school in Osijek, then studied law in Zagreb. His first job was as a trainee in the law office of Vasa Đurđević and he completed his articles with the attorney Dr Aleksandar Roknić in Sremska Mitrovica, in his native Vojvodina. In 1904 he established his own law practice and soon became politically active, drawn to the ideas of the Croat-Serb Coalition. In 1906 he was first elected to the Parliament of the Kingdom of Croatia-Slavonia, standing for the coalition in the electoral district of Morović in Syrmia. He continued to be elected from Morović and Sremska Mitrovica until the election of 1913. He made a name as a defense attorney in political trials aimed at destroying the Croat-Serb coalition. In 1908 he defended Serbs accused in Zagreb, showing that their indictment was based on a false interpretation of history. He was a defence counsel, with Tomáš Garrigue Masaryk, in the notable Friedjung trial of 1909, in which Heinrich Friedjung had tried to discredit the Croatian leader Frano Supilo by accusing him of working for Serbia. This ended in the collapse of a state indictment based on false documents and created a scandal for the Austrian empire, damaging the international reputation of its legal system. In 1910 Popović came to public attention again as defense counsel in the trial in Zagreb of Srđan Budisavljević, Laze Popović, Milan Metikoš, Milan Todorović, and Đorđe Gavrilović.

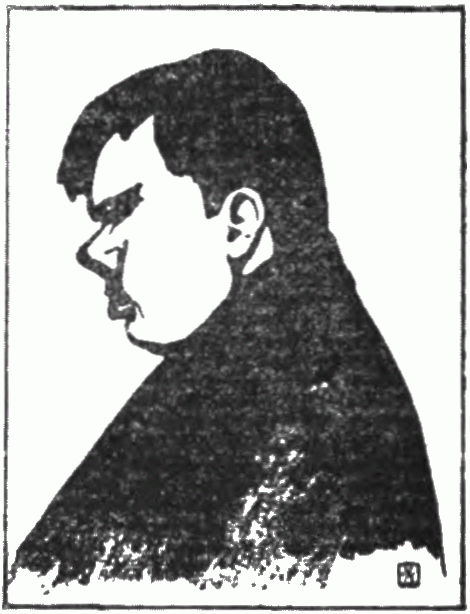
Popović caricatured in 1907

In 1910 Popović began to work as a lawyer based in Zagreb, and remained there until the Second World War. During the First World War he was a deputy in the Croatian Parliament at Zagreb and was also appointed as one of Croatia's forty delegates in the Hungarian-Croatian House of Representatives in Budapest. He was well-connected in Hungarian political circles, but at the outbreak of the war in 1914, he was arrested for political reasons, to take him out of public life and weaken the Croat-Serb coalition. However, he was able to rely on his parliamentary immunity.

After the end of the First World War, Popović withdrew from the public life of the new state, the Kingdom of Serbs, Croats and Slovenes, and returned to private practice as a lawyer. He spent the last years of his life in Belgrade, exploring historical sources, especially the medieval Chronicle of the Priest of Duklja.

== Family ==
Popović's parents were Stevan Popović (1839–1912) and Milica Bela Popović, formerly Nikolajević (born 1860), and he had three sisters, Ljubica, Desanka, and Milica. His paternal grandparents were Djordje Popović (1804–1860) and Daška Dafina Kacanska (1816–1889). His father and grandfather were both from Tovarnik.

Popović's sister Milica married Ivan Rikard Ivanović and was the mother of Vane Ivanović, a champion athlete and shipowner, of Daška McLean, and of a second son, Vladimir.
