= Bila Vlaka =

- Village
- Location within Croatia
- Coordinates: 43.916667°N 15.716667°E
- Country: Croatia
- County: Zadar
- Municipality: Stankovci

Area
  - Total: 7.4 km^{2} (2.9 sq mi)

Population (2021)
  - Total: 156
  - Density: 21/km^{2} (55/sq mi)
- Time zone: UTC+1 (CET)
  - Summer (DST): UTC+2 (CEST)

Bila Vlaka is a village in Stankovci municipality in Zadar county, Croatia. According to the 2011 census it has 164 inhabitants.
