= Zapužane =

- Village
- Interactive map of Zapužane
- Location of Zapužane in Croatia
- Coordinates: 44°00′51″N 15°33′45″E
- Country: Croatia
- Region: Adriatic Croatia
- County: Zadar County
- Municipality: Benkovac

Area
  - Total: 6.0 km^{2} (2.3 sq mi)
- Elevation: 117 m (384 ft)

Population (2021)
  - Total: 45
  - Density: 7.5/km^{2} (19/sq mi)
- Time zone: UTC+1 (CET)
  - Summer (DST): UTC+2 (CEST)
- Postal code: 23420
- Area code: (+385) 23

Zapužane is a village in the municipality of Benkovac, Zadar County, Croatia.

== Demographics ==
According to the 2011 census, the village of Zapužane has 56 inhabitants. This represents 10.24% of its pre-war population according to the 1991 census.

The 1991 census recorded that 97.25% of the village population were ethnic Serbs (532/547), 1.09% were Croats (6/547) while 1.66% were of other ethnic origin (9/547).

Historical population 1857-2011
v

population	150		188	207	240	286	257	326	419	466	555	568	619	547	25	56
	1857	1869	1880	1890	1900	1910	1921	1931	1948	1953	1961	1971	1981	1991	2001	2011

Sources: Croatian Bureau of Statistics publications
