= Dubrava kod Šibenika =

Settlement in Šibenik-Knin County, Croatia

- Settlement
- Interactive map of Dubrava kod Šibenika
- Location of Dubrava kod Šibenika in Croatia
- Coordinates: 43°43′58″N 15°57′06″E
- Country: Croatia
- County: Šibenik-Knin
- City: Šibenik

Area
  - Total: 27.3 km^{2} (10.5 sq mi)

Population (2021)
  - Total: 1,117
  - Density: 40.9/km^{2} (106/sq mi)
- Time zone: UTC+1 (CET)
  - Summer (DST): UTC+2 (CEST)
- Postal code: 22000 Šibenik
- Area code: +385 (0)22

Dubrava kod Šibenika is a settlement in the City of Šibenik in Croatia. In 2021, its population was 1117.

== History ==
The last weekend of July 2019, there was a severe fire in an open area by Dubrava. The JVP fire stations of Rijeka, Opatija, Krk and Delnice, under commander Slavko Tucaković, had to be called in to suppress it, with a total of 8 firefighting vehicles and 22 firefighters involved.

== Demographics ==
Dubrava kod Šibenika: Population trends 1857–2021
v

population	316	368	483	595	746	984	984	1465	1494	1537	1474	1332	1263	1231	1216	1185	1117
	1857	1869	1880	1890	1900	1910	1921	1931	1948	1953	1961	1971	1981	1991	2001	2011	2021

Sources: Croatian Bureau of Statistics publications
