= D54 road =

Road in Croatia

D54 state road

Route information
- Length: 13.5 km (8.4 mi)

Major junctions
- From: D8 near Maslenica
- To: D27 near Obrovac

Location
- Country: Croatia
- Counties: Zadar

Highway system
- Highways in Croatia

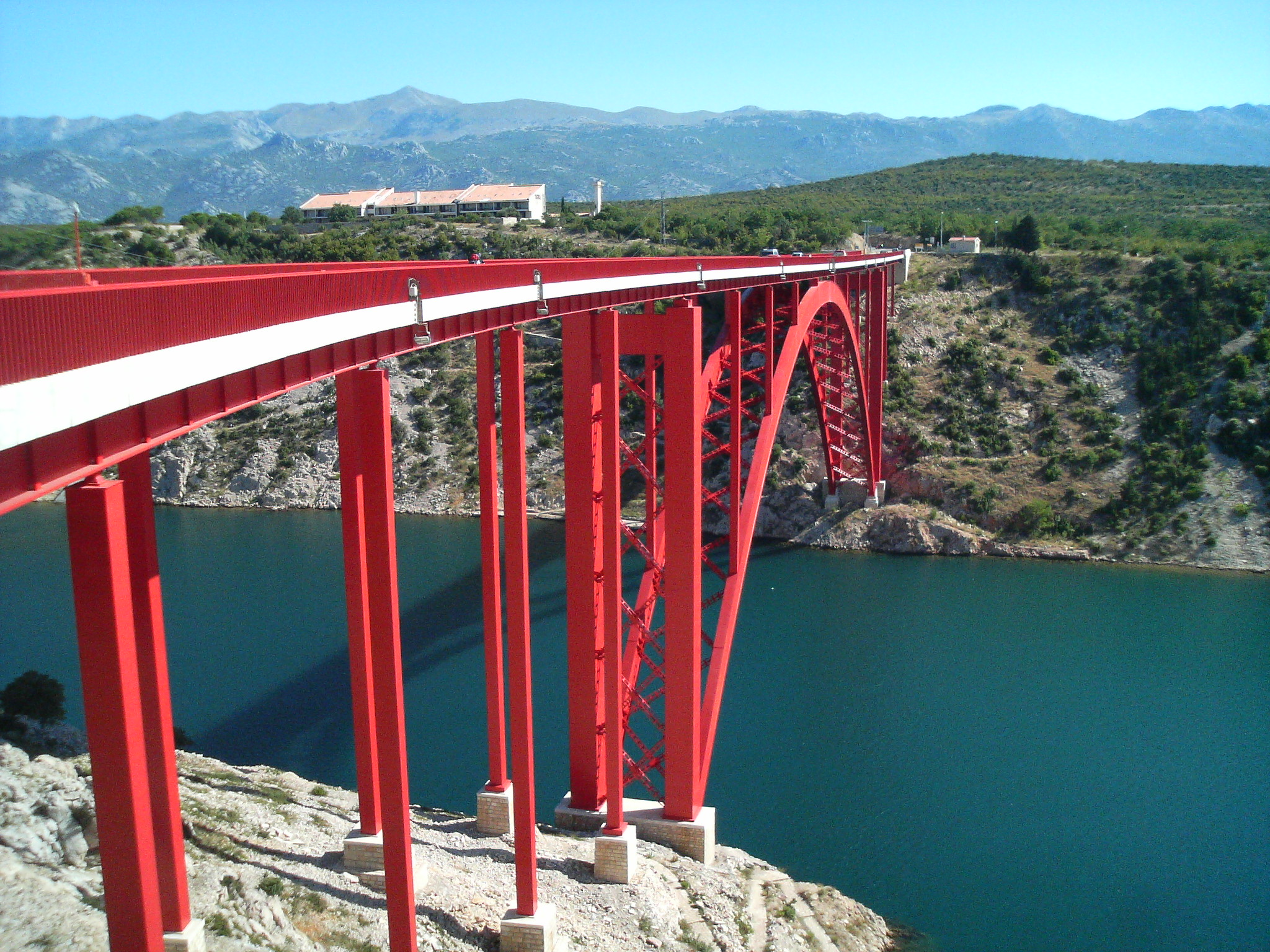
D54 starts just to the north of D8 Maslenica Bridge

D54 is a state road in the northern Dalmatia region of Croatia that branches off from D8 state road, facilitating access to Obrovac and D27 state road which in turn facilitates bypassing both Maslenica bridges. The road is 13.5 km (8.4 mi) long.

The western terminus of the road is located near Maslenica, at D8 state road route. At its eastern terminus, the road connects to D27 state road which serves as a parallel road to the A1 motorway, connecting to Benkovac (to the south) and to Gračac (to the north) facilitating a bypass of Maslenica bridges in case of strong winds preventing use of both of the bridges.

The road, as well as all other state roads in Croatia, is managed and maintained by Hrvatske ceste, a state-owned company.

== Traffic volume ==
Traffic is regularly counted and reported by Hrvatske ceste, operator of the road. Substantial variations between annual (AADT) and summer (ASDT) traffic volumes are attributed to the fact that the road connects a number of summer resorts to Croatian motorway network and is used as a bypass road for a section of the A1 motorway.

D54 traffic volume
Road	Counting site	AADT	ASDT	Notes
D54	4911 Jasenice	1,775	2,531	Adjacent to L63067 junction.

== Road junctions ==
D54 major junctions/populated areas
Type	Slip roads/Notes
	D8 near Maslenica to Starigrad (to the north) and Posedarje (to the south). The western terminus of the road.
	L63067 to Maslenica.
	Jasenice; L63036 to Vučipolje.
	Ž5166 to Obrovac.
	D27 near Obrovac to Gračac (to the north) and Benkovac to the south. The eastern terminus of the road.
