= Konjevrate =

Settlement in Šibenik-Knin County, Croatia

- Settlement
- Interactive map of Konjevrate
- Location of Konjevrate in Croatia
- Coordinates: 43°46′57″N 16°01′08″E
- Country: Croatia
- County: Šibenik-Knin
- City: Šibenik

Area
  - Total: 5.6 km^{2} (2.2 sq mi)

Population (2021)
  - Total: 179
  - Density: 32/km^{2} (83/sq mi)
- Time zone: UTC+1 (CET)
  - Summer (DST): UTC+2 (CEST)
- Postal code: 22323 Unešić
- Area code: +385 (0)22

Konjevrate is a settlement in the City of Šibenik in Croatia. In 2021, its population was 179.

== Demographics ==
Konjevrate: Population trends 1857–2021
v

population	925	1043	233	224	270	296	345	362	299	337	369	258	237	193	182	173	179
	1857	1869	1880	1890	1900	1910	1921	1931	1948	1953	1961	1971	1981	1991	2001	2011	2021

Sources: Croatian Bureau of Statistics publications

== Landmarks ==
Vidovića greda is a scenic viewpoint from which the junction of the Čikola and Krka rivers can be seen.

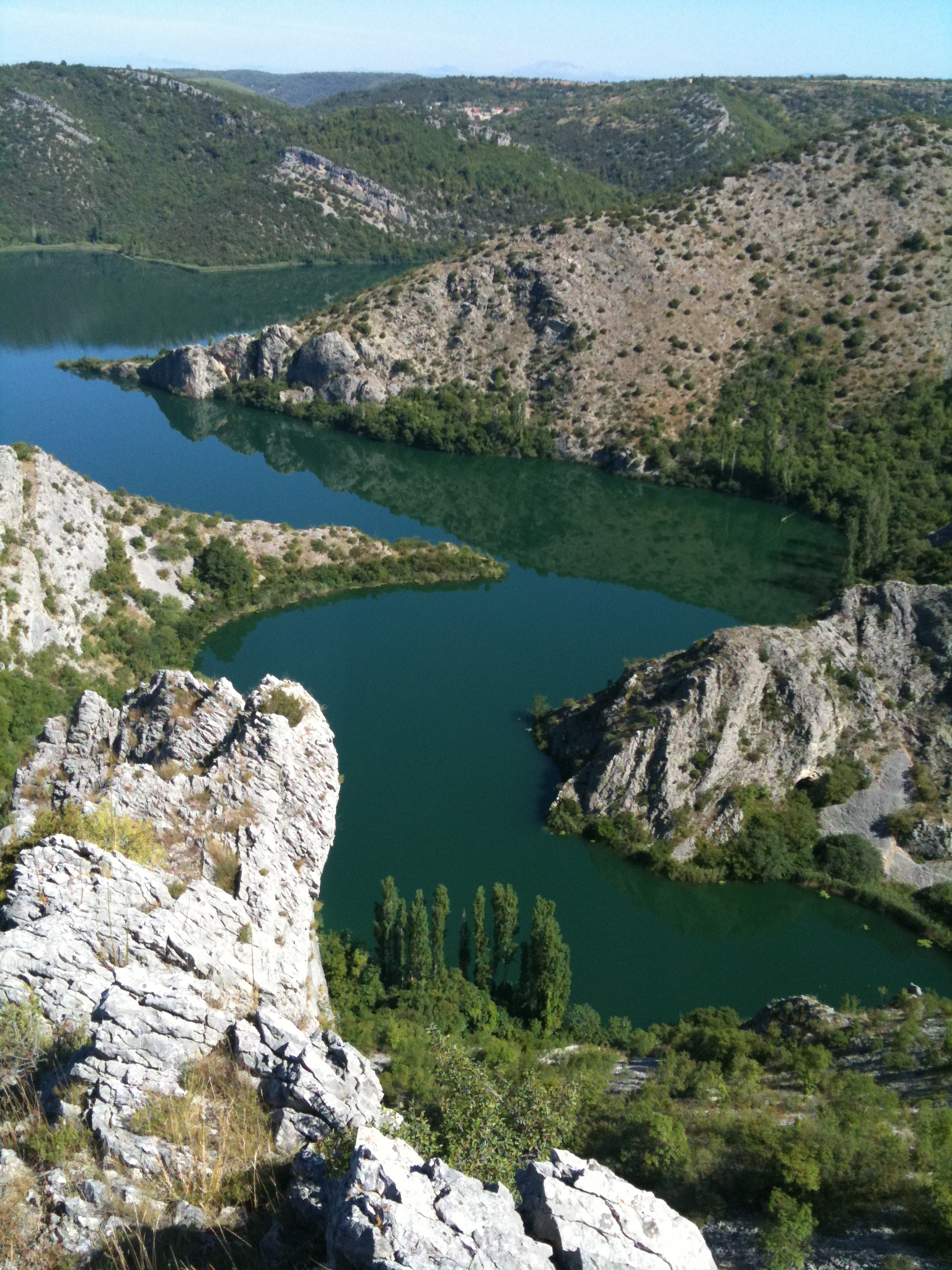
Vidovića greda
