= Lozovac =

Settlement in Šibenik-Knin County, Croatia

- Settlement
- Interactive map of Lozovac
- Location of Lozovac in Croatia
- Coordinates: 43°48′01″N 15°57′36″E
- Country: Croatia
- County: Šibenik-Knin
- City: Šibenik

Area
  - Total: 16.0 km^{2} (6.2 sq mi)

Population (2021)
  - Total: 318
  - Density: 19.9/km^{2} (51.5/sq mi)
- Time zone: UTC+1 (CET)
  - Summer (DST): UTC+2 (CEST)
- Postal code: 22000 Šibenik
- Area code: +385 (0)22

Lozovac is a settlement in the City of Šibenik in Croatia. In 2021, its population was 318.

== Demographics ==
Lozovac: Population trends 1857–2021
v

population	326	320	356	430	434	586	612	672	818	1007	978	734	618	491	389	368	318
	1857	1869	1880	1890	1900	1910	1921	1931	1948	1953	1961	1971	1981	1991	2001	2011	2021

Sources: Croatian Bureau of Statistics publications
