= Bilice, Šibenik-Knin County =

Bilice
- Interactive map of Bilice
- Location within Croatia
- Coordinates: 43°46′12″N 15°55′1″E
- Country: Croatia
- Region: Dalmatia
- County: Šibenik-Knin County

Area
  - Total: 20.9 km^{2} (8.1 sq mi)

Population (2021)
  - Total: 2,546
  - Density: 122/km^{2} (316/sq mi)
- Time zone: UTC+1 (CET)
  - Summer (DST): UTC+2 (CEST)
- Postal code: 22000 Šibenik
- Website: opcina-bilice.hr

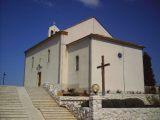
Bilice church

Bilice is a village and the only settlement in the eponymous municipality in Šibenik-Knin County, Croatia.

== Demographics ==
Bilice: Population trends 1857–2021
v

population	402	363	544	579	709	897	947	1398	1301	1384	1432	1368	1396	1643	2179	2307	2546
	1857	1869	1880	1890	1900	1910	1921	1931	1948	1953	1961	1971	1981	1991	2001	2011	2021

Sources: Croatian Bureau of Statistics publications
