= Stankovci, Zadar County =

Stankovci
- Municipality
- Interactive map of Stankovci
- Location of Stankovci in Croatia
- Coordinates: 43°55′N 15°42′E
- Country: Croatia
- Region: Dalmatia
- County: Zadar County

Area
  - Municipality: 68.7 km^{2} (26.5 sq mi)
  - Urban: 11.7 km^{2} (4.5 sq mi)

Population (2021)
  - Municipality: 1,831
  - Density: 26.7/km^{2} (69.0/sq mi)
  - Urban: 634
  - Urban density: 54.2/km^{2} (140/sq mi)
- Website: stankovci.hr

Stankovci is a village and a municipality in the Zadar County in Croatia.

== History ==
The Stankovci settlement was created after the battles between the Venetians and the Turks in the 16th and 17th centuries. After heavy fighting, a new population settled in the affected area under the leadership of the Franciscans, and in 1747 a Catholic parish was established.

== Population ==
The community center and the largest settlement is Stankovci.

In 2021, the municipality had 1,831 residents in the following 7 settlements:

- Banjevci, population 401
- Bila Vlaka, population 156
- Budak, population 342
- Crljenik, population 123
- Morpolača, population 50
- Stankovci, population 634
- Velim, population 125
Stankovci: Population trends 1857–2021
v

population	1353	1315	1751	1861	2178	2438	3169	3225	3561	3746	3736	3488	3131	2998	2088	2003	1831
	1857	1869	1880	1890	1900	1910	1921	1931	1948	1953	1961	1971	1981	1991	2001	2011	2021

Sources: Croatian Bureau of Statistics publications

== Politics ==
=== Minority councils and representatives ===
Directly elected minority councils and representatives are tasked with consulting tasks for the local or regional authorities in which they are advocating for minority rights and interests, integration into public life and participation in the management of local affairs. At the 2023 Croatian national minorities councils and representatives elections Serbs of Croatia fulfilled legal requirements to elect 10 members minority councils of the Municipality of Stankovci but the elections were not held due to the absence of candidatures.
