= Geneva Declaration (1918) =

Abandoned agreement on the creation of Yugoslavia

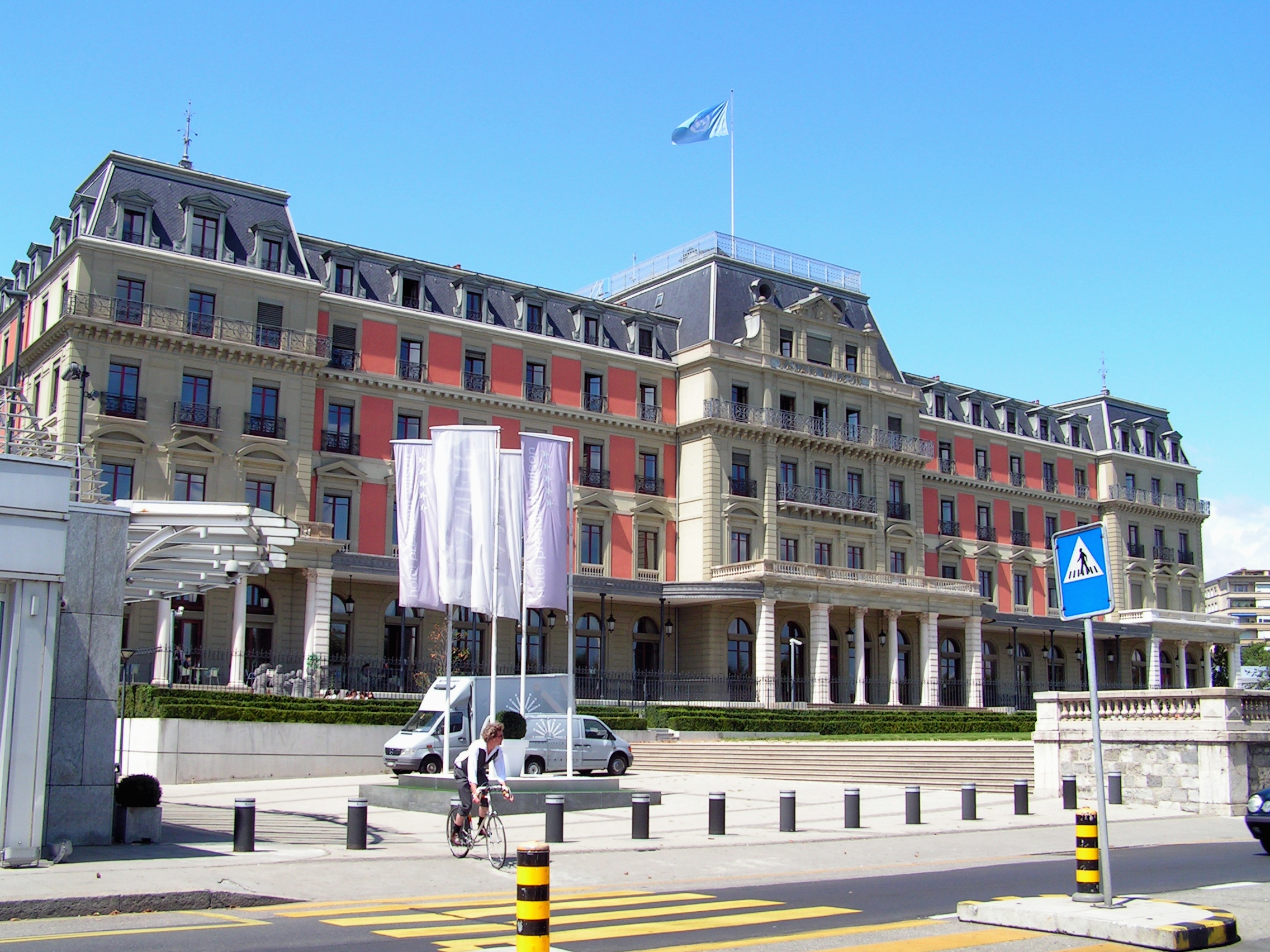
- The declaration was negotiated in present-day Palais Wilson (then Hôtel National)
- Created: 9 November 1918
- Location: Geneva, Switzerland
- Signatories: Nikola Pašić for the Kingdom of Serbia; Milorad Drašković, Marko Trifković, and Vojislav Marinković for the Serbian parliamentary opposition; Anton Korošec, Gregor Žerjav, and Melko Čingrija for the National Council of Slovenes, Croats and Serbs; Ante Trumbić, Jovan Banjanin, Gustav Gregorin, Nikola Stojanović, and Dušan Vasiljević for the Yugoslav Committee
- Purpose: Determination of the system of government in the process of creation of Yugoslavia

The Geneva Declaration, Geneva Agreement, or Geneva Pact (Note: Title of the document reads Zapisnik Konferencije održane 6.–9. 1918. u Genevi, Hotel National which means "Record of the Conference Held in the Hotel National in Geneva on 6–9 1918". In contemporary and later sources including those published in Yugoslavia, Croatia and Serbia, the document is normally referred to as the Geneva Declaration (Ženevska deklaracija), or the Geneva Agreement (Ženevski sporazum), but also as the Geneva Pact (Ženevski pakt).) was a statement of political agreement on the provisional political system in the future union of the South Slavs living in the territories of the former Austro-Hungarian Empire and Kingdom of Serbia. It was agreed by Serbian Prime Minister Nikola Pašić on behalf of Serbia, representatives of Serbian parliamentary opposition, representatives of the National Council of the State of Slovenes, Croats and Serbs which recently seceded from Austria-Hungary, and representatives of the Yugoslav Committee. The talks held in Geneva, Switzerland on 6–9 November 1918 built upon and were intended to supersede the 1917 Corfu Declaration agreed by Pašić and Yugoslav Committee president Ante Trumbić. The basis for the talks was provided by the Greek Prime Minister Eleftherios Venizelos on behalf of the Supreme War Council of the Triple Entente. The talks were necessary in the process of creation of Yugoslavia as a means to demonstrate to the Entente powers that various governments and interests groups could cooperate on the project to establish a viable state.

Trumbić and Anton Korošec leading delegations of the Yugoslav Committee and the National Council of Slovenes, Croats and Serbs respectively generally conducted the negotiations from a common platform. The Serbian opposition sided with the Yugoslav Committee aiming to undermine Pašić's hold on power. Trumbić's proposal to establish a confederal system of government was adopted. It envisaged a common government having foreign affairs, defence, common finances, communications and transport, as well as several other departments. The proposal also specified retaining the Serbian government and the National Council as the executive in the State of Slovenes, Croats and Serbs to manage affairs relevant for the two states separately. Pašić also agreed to recognise the National Council as a legitimate government and to ask the Entente to do the same. Pašić accepted the Geneva Declaration only after President of France Raymond Poincaré personally intervened telling him to agree with the Yugoslav Committee.

The Serbian government first accepted the declaration, and only days later reversed the course when Pašić suggested in a message to his finance minister Stojan Protić that the Prince Regent Alexander might use his prerogative to reshuffle the government. The government rejected the Geneva Declaration and resigned—only to be replaced two days later by a coalition government led by Pašić and including the former opposition in its ranks. In the State of Slovenes, Croats and Serbs, the leader of the largest political party, the Croat-Serb Coalition Svetozar Pribićević, rejected the Geneva Declaration as well. Faced with internal unrest caused by the Green Cadres, peasant revolts, and mutinies in the military, as well as the approaching Italian Army enforcing Italian territorial claims under the Treaty of London following the Armistice of Villa Giusti, the National Council dispatched a delegation to seek urgent unification from Prince Regent Alexander—leading to establishment of the Kingdom of Serbs, Croats and Slovenes on 1 December 1918.

== Background ==
=== Corfu Declaration ===
During World War I, the government of Serbia, led by Prime Minister Nikola Pašić, met with the ad-hoc interest group Yugoslav Committee. The committee, partially funded by Serbia, was chaired by Ante Trumbić and claimed to represent the South Slavs living in Austria-Hungary. The conference was convened in 1917 on the Greek island of Corfu to discuss the system of government in a future union of Serbia and South Slavic-populated Habsburg lands.

The meeting was meant to recapture initiative for Yugoslavist ideas on the unification of South Slavs, and to preserve chances for achieving the expansionist Serbian war aims set out in the Niš Declaration. Both were thought to be in jeopardy following a trialist reform proposed in the May Declaration of the Yugoslav Club of South Slavic representatives in the Austrian Imperial Council, led by Anton Korošec, while Serbia's allies in the Triple Entente were still supporting the preservation of Austria-Hungary. Deprived of Russian backing since the February Revolution, Pašić felt compelled to negotiate with the Yugoslav Committee.

Yugoslav Committee members learned that the Entente, under the 1915 Treaty of London, had promised Italy parts of Austro-Hungarian territory inhabited by South Slavs to entice Italy to join the Entente. Most of the committee members saw that as a threat that could only be checked with help from Serbia, prompting them to accept Pašić's invitation to Corfu. Frano Supilo, the co-founder of the ruling Croat-Serb Coalition (HSK) in Croatia-Slavonia and the most prominent member of the Yugoslav Committee and advocate of a South Slavic federation, resigned his committee membership in protest. Supilo resigned because his caution against discussions without determining Serbian intentions first were ignored.

The Corfu conference revealed a conflict between Pašić and Trumbić, as the former advocated a centralised state while the latter wanted a federal system of government, fearing a hegemony of the Serbs as the most populous ethnic group in the proposed state. In response to Trumbić's demands, Pašić said that if the Croats insisted on a federation, the Serbian government would abandon the unification project in favour of creation of a Greater Serbia. No agreement on the system of government was reached and the adopted Corfu Declaration left the matter for the future Constituent Assembly to decide by an unspecified qualified majority.

=== Pašić–Trumbić conflict ===
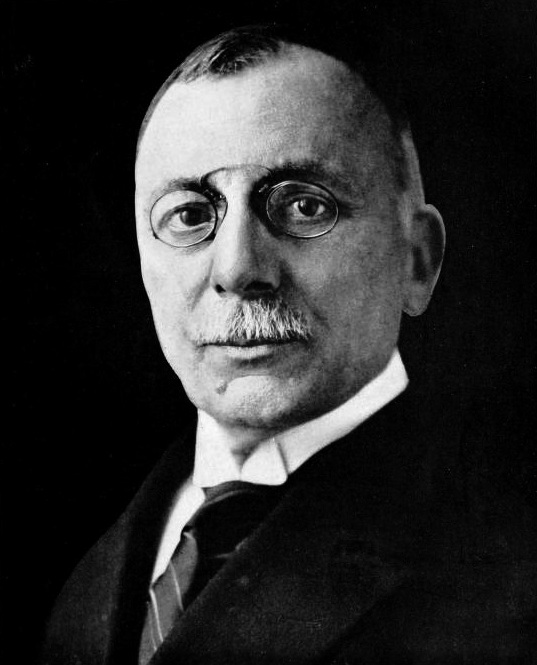
Ante Trumbić led the Yugoslav Committee in the run-up to creation of Yugoslavia.

It was apparent in the aftermath of the Corfu conference, relations between Pašić and Trumbić worsened and kept deteriorating throughout 1918. The two openly disagreed on several issues advocated by Trumbić including the matter of recognition of the Serbs, Croats, and Slovenes living in Austria Hungary as allied peoples, recognition of the Yugoslav Committee as the representative of those peoples and the Serbs, Croats, and Slovenes Volunteer Corps as an allied force drawn from Serbs, Croats, and Slovenes living in Austria-Hungary. Unable to achieve those goals on his own, Trumbić wanted Pašić to help persuade the Entente powers to grant Trumbić's requests. Their relations remained tense, but despite ignored pleas to Pašić, they remained in contact until the end of the war. Pašić and Trumbić met again on 30 October in Paris. Pašić rejected Trumbić once again, but this time, Trumbić asked the remainder of the Yugoslav Committee to authorise him to seek fulfilment of his earlier requests from the Entente powers directly, bypassing Pašić. The Yugoslav Committee agreed the next day.

Besides the rejection of Trumbić's demands, friction was caused by Pašić's response to the Entente regarding potential preservation of Austria-Hungary. The United Kingdom, France, and the United States pursued separate peace with Austria-Hungary detaching it from Germany until early 1918. This position was not affected by Niš or Corfu declarations. In January 1918, the Prime Minister of the United Kingdom David Lloyd George confirmed his support to survival of Austria-Hungary. The President of the United States Woodrow Wilson agreed in his Fourteen Points speech by advocating autonomy for the peoples of Austria-Hungary. In April, this prompted Pašić to direct Serbian ambassador to the United States to investigate if Serbia could receive Bosnia and Herzegovina as the minimum addition to its pre-war territory.

On 15 October, Lloyd George and Pašić met in London to discuss creation of a unified South Slavic state with or without Serbia – in the latter case potentially within reformed Austria-Hungary. On Pašić's insistence that any South Slavic state created without Serbia makes its losses meaningless, Lloyd George replied that everything depended on circumstances at the end of the war: He pointed out that if the Serbian Army occupied desired territory before an armistice Serbia could annex it. Otherwise, there would be negotiations to consider wishes of affected populations. On 12–17 October, Pašić gave several interviews to the British press. Accused of imperialism, Pašić replied that Serbia was liberating the Croats and the Slovenes who will be given the chance to choose to join Serbia or establish own states. He mentioned no possibility of establishment of a South Slavic political union of equals.

Supported by British historians Wickham Steed and Arthur Evans, Trumbić unsuccessfully asked Wilson to deploy US troops to Croatia-Slavonia to quell disorder associated with the Green Cadres and stem the tide of Bolshevism. Trumbić specifically asked not to allow Italian or Serbian troops into the territory. Relations between Pašić and Trumbić deteriorated to political and even personal animosity. By the end of 1918, Trumbić thought that Pašić should be toppled from power as an oligarch.

=== National Council becomes involved ===
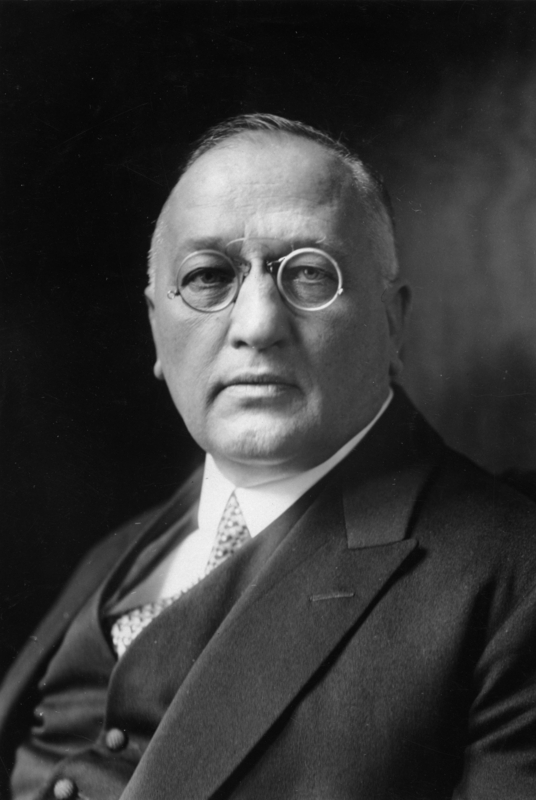
Anton Korošec presided over the National Council of Slovenes, Croats and Serbs in 1918

On 5–6 October, representatives of Austro-Hungarian Croat, Serb, and Slovene political parties organised the National Council of Slovenes, Croats and Serbs to work to independence. On 18 October, the body declared itself the central organ of the newly proclaimed State of Slovenes, Croats and Serbs encompassing the Slovene Lands, Croatia-Slavonia, Dalmatia, and Bosnia and Herzegovina. The National Council elected Korošec its president. It had two vice presidents. One was Svetozar Pribićević – a co-founder of the ruling HSK and the coalition's sole leader since Supilo's death in 1917. Another vice president was Ante Pavelić, the leader of the Mile Starčević faction of the Party of Rights.

On 26 October, the National Council decided to authorise the Yugoslav Committee to speak on behalf of the council. On the same day, Korošec met Austrian Minister-President Heinrich Lammasch in Vienna and proceeded with Yugoslav Club secretary Gregor Žerjav to Switzerland where they were met by Melko Čingrija, another former Yugoslav Club member, on 29 October. Korošec was tasked by the National Council to "reconnoiter the international situation and establish contact with the Yugoslav Committee". The same day, the Croatian Sabor declared the end of ties with Austria-Hungary and elected Korošec the president of the State of Slovenes, Croats and Serbs. Pavelić and Pribićević were elected vice presidents.

Upon learning of Korošec's arrival, Pašić and Trumbić both reached out to him. Trumbić wrote to Korošec on 31 October outlining his talks with Pašić and asking for recognition of the Yugoslav Committee as a body representing interests of peoples living in the newly declared state. Pašić saw Korošec as a potential alternative to Trumbić having legitimacy of being an elected representative. He prepared to travel with Serbian opposition representatives Milorad Drašković and Marko Trifković to Switzerland to meet Korošec. On 1 November, Korošec invited Trumbić and Pašić to separate talks in Geneva. Korošec could not travel to Paris because he was issued visa for the neutral Switzerland only.

== November conference ==
=== Paris talks ===
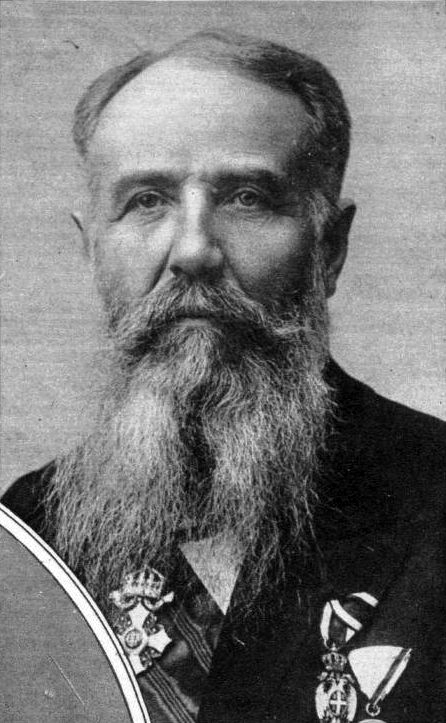
Nikola Pašić negotiated the Geneva Declaration with representatives of the Yugoslav Committee, the National Council of Slovenes, Croats and Serbs and the Serbian opposition.

Trumbić wrote to Pašić on 11 October 1918 proposing to reconvene parties to the Corfu Declaration and representatives of the Montenegrin Committee for Unification in Paris in two weeks to ensure, facilitate, and expedite unification. Even though Pašić wrote back on 25 October inviting Trumbić to visit him in Paris, Pašić ignored the 11 October proposal. On 1 November, in a report to the Prince Regent, Pašić requested a message to be forwarded to Pribićević through Serbian Army liaison officer in Zagreb, Lieutenant Colonel Dušan Simović. In the message, Pašić asked Pribićević to cooperate with him on urgent unification to defend against Italian irredentism. In response, Pribićević provided regular information on political situation to Simović.

According to Trumbić, British Foreign Secretary Arthur Balfour was willing to recognise South Slavic population of Austria-Hungary as an allied nation on that day, but the recognition was withheld on request of French Foreign Minister Stephen Pichon until the British and the French agreed on the matter. On 29 October, the Supreme War Council met in Versailles, a day after Austria-Hungary requested armistice. While the terms were discussed, the French Prime Minister Georges Clemenceau promised Italian Prime Minister Vittorio Emanuele Orlando no Balkan Slavic state would be recognised before the terms of the armistice were implemented. The Entente allies also declined to recognise the State of Slovenes, Croats and Serbs or the Serbian claim of being the central unifying force among the South Slavs like Piedmont in Italian unification. The Supreme War Council also decided not to recognise any formal role of Yugoslav Committee deeming South Slavic unification unrealistic until the parties demonstrate their ability to come to an agreement. Serbia added its opposition to recognition of any official role of the Yugoslav Committee. Armistice of Villa Giusti, ending the war for Austria-Hungary was signed on 3 November. By that time, Serbian Army and the rest of the Allied Army of the Orient reached Sava and Danube rivers in Belgrade – the prewar Austro-Hungarian border.

On 3 November, Lloyd George and Balfour informed the Serbian government and opposition, as well as Trumbić and Korošec through Greek Prime Minister Eleftherios Venizelos and the secretary of the Czechoslovak National Council Edvard Beneš that no South Slavic union would be considered unless they worked together towards that objective. Venizelos proposed to the Serbian ambassador to London, on behalf of the Entente, recognition of the Yugoslav Committee, establishment of a coalition government in Serbia involving the current opposition, and establishment of a five-strong joint war cabinet consisting of the presiding foreign minister, two ministers drawn from the Serbian government, and two members of the Yugoslav Committee. He said the war cabinet was to be tasked with conducting foreign and associated affairs, without elaborating any further. Beneš talked to Čingrija in Geneva and told him that Lloyd George, Balfour, and Clemenceau wanted a unified South Slavic position to help Orlando overcome opposition from his foreign minister Sydney Sonnino. Beneš advised Čingrija to insist on democratic principles and avoid details and told him that Pašić would be included in the war cabinet. Beneš suggested there should be a joint ministry established consisting of eight members drawn from Serbia and as many from other lands. Such body would then represent the future union at the upcoming peace conference. Credibility of the messages was reinforced by publication of the same position in semiofficial Le Temps newspaper on 3 and 4 November.

Pašić, Drašković and Trumbić met on 4 November in Paris prompted by the Entente pressure to come to an agreement. They discussed the suggested establishment and role of the war cabinet and drafted an agreement whereby the Serbian government would be reshuffled, the Yugoslav Committee would admit new members drawn from the National Council, and a common body would be established within the meaning of the proposal put forward by Venizelos. However, Pašić refused to sign the draft abandoning the agreement at the last moment.

=== Geneva talks ===
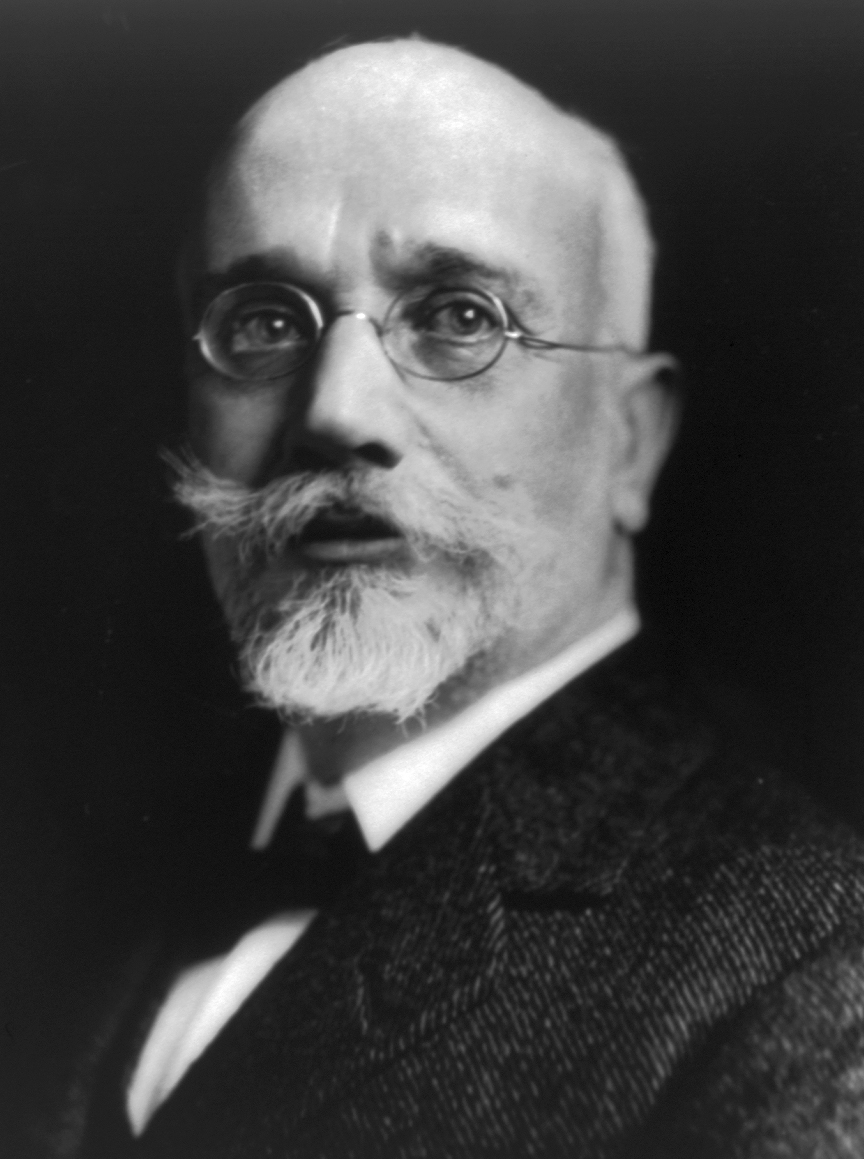
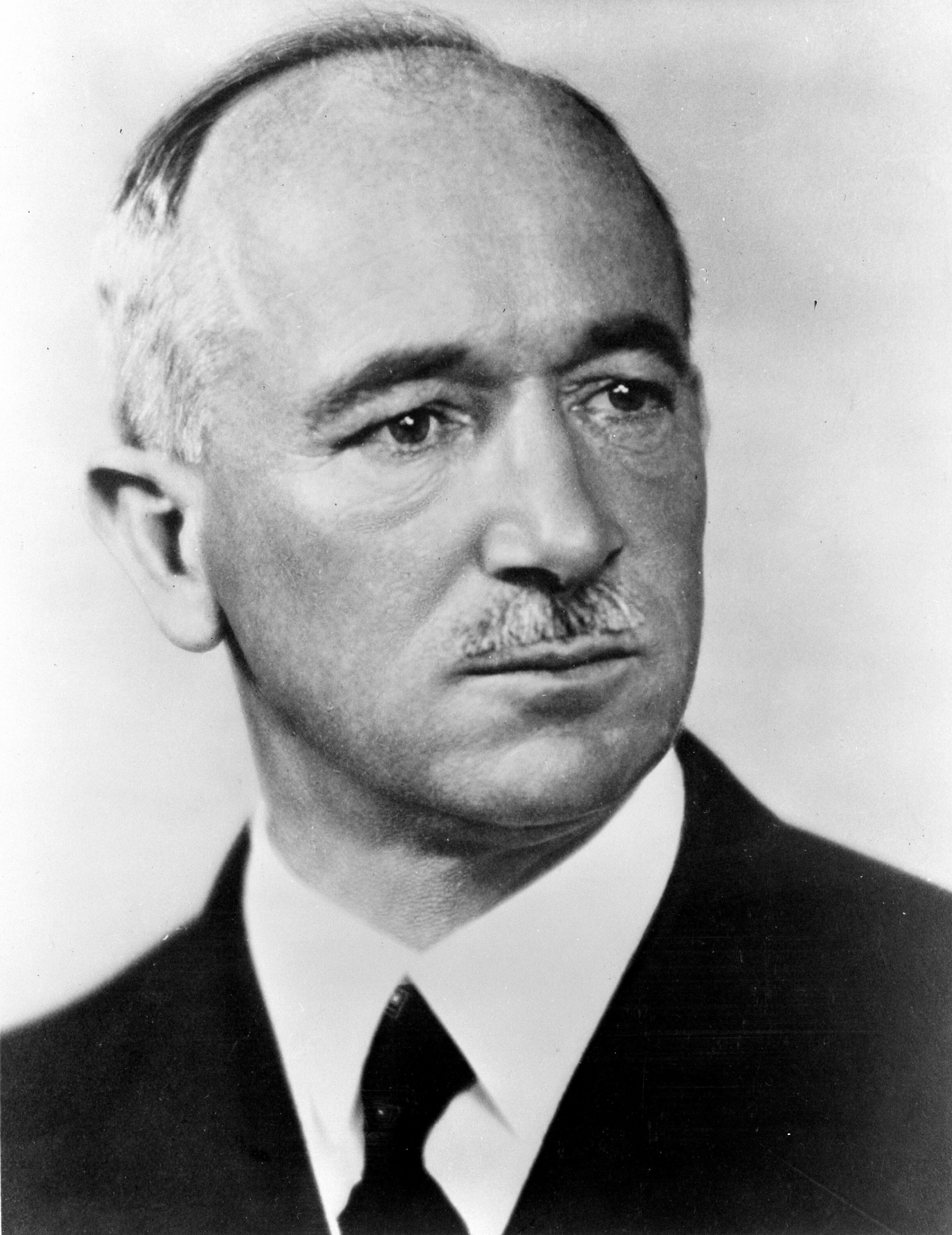
Greek Prime Minister Eleftherios Venizelos (left) and the Czechoslovak National Council Secretary Edvard Beneš (right) relayed information from the Supreme War Council to Serbian Prime Minister Nikola Pašić and representatives of the National Council of Slovenes, Croats and Serbs negotiating in November 1918.

Pašić, Serbian opposition leaders, and Trumbić moved to Hôtel National in Geneva on 6 November where they met with the National Council delegation. The Entente powers wanted them to come to an agreement to demonstrate that a South Slavic union is possible at all. Trumbić and Korošec quickly agreed with each other – forming a joint negotiating bloc. Pašić alone represented the Serbian government. Serbian opposition leaders Drašković and Trifković were joined by Vojislav Marinković. The National Council was represented by Čingrija and Žerjav besides Korošec. Trumbić was joined by Yugoslav Committee members Jovan Banjanin, Gustav Gregorin, Nikola Stojanović, and Dušan Vasiljević. Even though Korošec asserted himself as a head of a state by asking Pašić if he agreed to have Trumbić present for the talks, Korošec recognised that he needed Trumbić as a person with far better relations with the Entente powers and the Serbian opposition. Being amid a cabinet crisis, the Serbian opposition negotiated from a position of hostility towards Pašić who was left isolated in his views regarding the matter of composition and responsibilities of the war cabinet following suggestions of the British government published by Le Temps.

The war cabinet was acceptable to everyone involved, but opinions differed on its capacity and status. Pašić preferred it to be an ad hoc body without specifying who would be represented by the body – the future union as a whole or Serbia and the State of Slovenes, Croats and Serbs individually. Korošec and Trumbić advocated the latter solution, arguing that each state should delegate members on its own. Korošec saw the proposed war cabinet as a means of fulfilment of his objective of gaining recognition of the State of Slovenes, Croats and Serbs. Conversely, Pašić did not rush to an agreement because Serbia was the only internationally recognised entity involved in the unification process and he would not surrender this advantage. On the first day of the Geneva talks, Pašić proposed to delegate certain executive tasks to a joint commission to conduct foreign policy and defence until the end of the war. According to his plan, four members would be appointed by Serbia, and three by the National Council.

On 7 November, Drašković proposed a modification of the Venizelos plan involving a five-member war cabinet and 17-strong government retaining the departmental divisions of the current Serbian government. It would be appointed by the Serbian Parliament on one side and the Yugoslav Committee and the National Council on the other. The new government would replace the Serbian government and the National Council in its executive role – transforming the latter to a legislative body only. Unlike the model proposed by Pašić, this meant establishment of a union by establishment of a common government. While Trumbić was reserved on the proposal fearing it allowed excessive centralisation of the union, and Pašić refused it. Later that day, Trumbić proposed establishment of a common government for common affairs – cooperating with the government of Serbia and the National Council. The government of Serbia and the National Council would remain in place with ministries of affairs kept within the competences of Serbia and the State of Slovenes, Croats and Serbs respectively. The common ministry would be competent for foreign affairs, military, communications and transport, common finances, navy, prisoners of war and disabled. The ministers appointed by Serbia would swear an oath to the King of Serbia, but those appointed by the National Council would swear an oath to the council.

=== Acceptance and signing ===
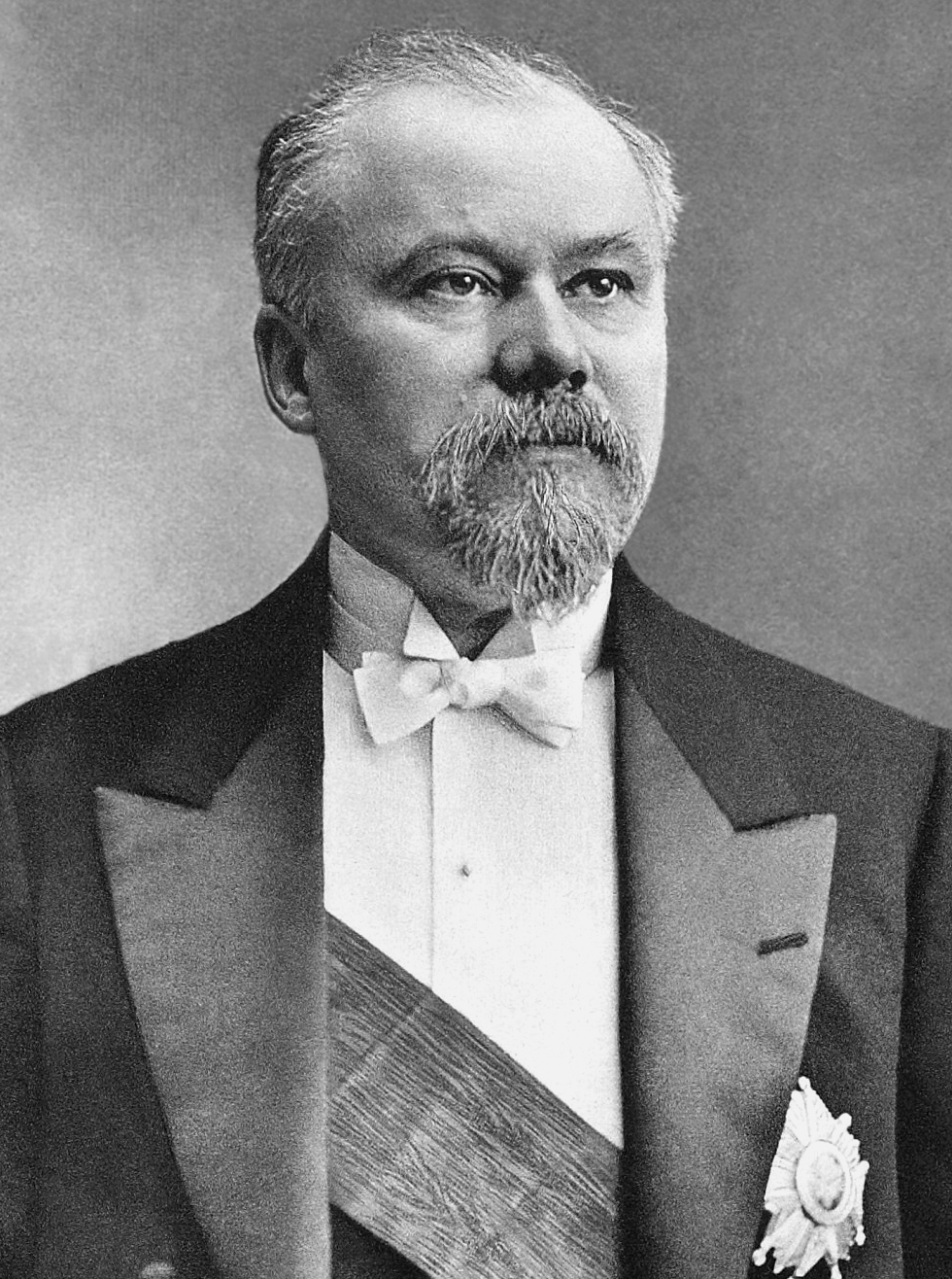
Raymond Poincaré sent a message to Nikola Pašić during the Geneva conference asking him to agree with the Yugoslav Committee.

Despite insistence by the Yugoslav Committee representatives and threats by Drašković and Trifković that the Serbian opposition would join the Yugoslav Committee and work against the Serbian government, Pašić seemed determined not to compromise. This changed on 7 November when a coded message was received from Serbian embassy in Paris stating that the President of France Raymond Poincaré wishes Pašić to come to an agreement with the representatives of the National Council. After receiving the news of Poincaré's intervention, Pašić accepted Trumbić's plan. Furthermore, on Korošec's proposal, he also accepted the request for Serbia to recognise the National Council as lawful government of the State of Slovenes, Croats and Serbs living in the territory formerly ruled by Austria-Hungary and to ask its allies to recognise the National Council as the government, and to recognise the Slovenes, Croats, and Serbs living in the territory of former Austria-Hungary as allies and the Serbs, Croats, and Slovenes Volunteer Corps as their military. Thus, the issues at the centre of Pašić–Trumbić dispute were resolved, and a confederal solution was agreed upon for the future union – resembling the dual monarchy system employed by Austria-Hungary. On insistence of Trumbić and the Serbian opposition supported by Korošec, Pašić renounced his participation in the common government. The accepted solution was meant to supersede the Corfu Declaration.

At the conference, Montenegro was invited to join the new union. Conference participants welcomed the prospect of Montenegro joining the common state and expressed fear of violence perpetrated by Serbian volunteers which were moving into Montenegro at the time. The Conference authorised Korošec, Čingrija, and Žerjav to talk to Montenegrin government minister Milo Vujović. The four met on 8 November and Vujović said it would be possible to discuss Montenegrin accession to the union in about two weeks.

Pašić suddenly announced he was leaving Geneva trying to avoid signing any agreement. In response, the remaining conference participants quickly drafted a declaration containing the agreement reached for Pašić to sign. The document set the number of common ministries to twelve, and also specified that the arrangement was provisional until a constitutional assembly determines the system of government in the new union through a new constitution. One of the ministries foreseen by the final document was tasked with preparation of the constituent assembly. Six out of twelve ministers were appointed – three by Serbia and three by the National Council. The former group consisted of Ljubomir Davidović, Mihailo Gavrilović, and Dragoljub Pavlović. The National Council appointed ministers were Janko Brejc, Čingrija, and Vasiljević. The remaining ministers were to be appointed later. The declaration was signed on 9 November by all twelve conference participants. While signing the declaration, Pašić said he had reservations or doubts about it.

== Aftermath ==
=== Repudiation of the agreement ===
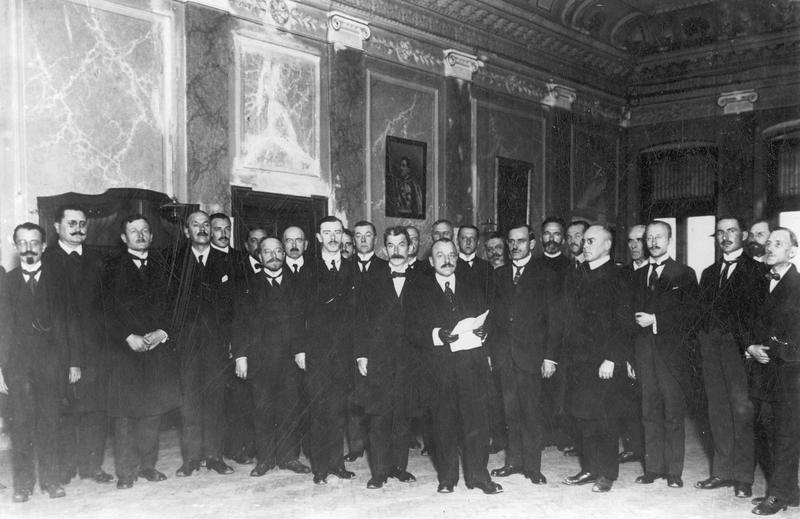
Address of the delegation of the National Council of the State of Slovenes, Croats and Serbs to the Prince Regent Alexander.

Pašić notified the Prince Regent Alexander and the finance minister Stojan Protić about the course and results of the talks by telegraph on 7 November. In the telegram, Pašić asked the Prince Regent to recognise the National Council as agreed by him. Protić reported back consent with Pašić's acceptance of the Trumbić's proposal on behalf of the Government on 10 November, adding that the Prince Regent will certainly approve. On 11 November, Protić received another telegram – sent by Pašić on 9 November. Shortly afterwards, Protić rescinded his approval for the Geneva Declaration.

In the second telegram, Pašić specified little additional information expanding on his initial message, but he complained that other conference participants exhibited inadequate trust in him and incorrectly claimed that the common ministers would swear oaths to both the king and the National Council. Pašić concluded his message with a note that he turns attention to the Prince Regent that he may use his prerogative and look for other advisors and ministers. Protić understood this as a cryptic instruction to the government to resign – which he did on 12 November. According to Sabrina P. Ramet, Pašić was compelled by the Prince Regent to resign, while Ivo Banac assessed acceptance of the declaration and subsequent resignation as Pašić's tactic designed to commit the National Council and the Yugoslav Committee to speedy unification while relying on Pribićević to undermine Korošec's authority. In his reply to Pašić, Protić wrote he thought it inappropriate for ministers to swear oath to anyone except the king and that he understood the role of the common government differently from the initial message and that the second message clarified it to him – even though the second telegram contained very little relevant new information. In his message Protić wrote that further negotiations with Trumbić and Korošec were not acceptable and informed Pašić there were others in the State of Slovenes, Croats and Serbs who disagreed with Trumbić, referring to Pribićević and his HSK having greatest influence in the National Council. On 25 November, Pribićević informed Pašić by telegraph that he did not feel bound by the Geneva Declaration.

On 14 November, Pašić informed Trumbić and Korošec that the solution agreed upon by them in Geneva was rejected by the Serbian government and by the Prince Regent because the war cabinet would not swear an oath to the Serbian king, and it would not answer to him. Pašić offered them a single government for the entire country, or a committee attached to the Serbian government. Korošec and Trumbić protested, but they were incapable of preserving the Geneva Declaration. The Serbian opposition abandoned Trumbić and negotiated with Pašić establishment of a coalition government on 16 November.

=== Unification ===
The National Council was facing pressure from several sides. There was increasing looting associated with a peasant revolt, rebelling former Austro-Hungarian troops, violence by the Green Cadres suspected of promoting Bolshevism, and a reported coup d'état conspiracy. There was intra-ethnic violence in Bosnia and Herzegovina and the National Council requested Serbian Army to help quell the violence. The Italian Army was advancing from the west, seizing Rijeka and approaching Ljubljana. Having no legal means to stop Italian advance which was authorised by the Supreme War Council or forces sufficient to stop it, the National Council feared that the Italian presence on the eastern shores of the Adriatic would become permanent. Pressed by the combined threats, the National Council dispatched a delegation to Prince Regent to arrange urgent unification in a federation. The delegation ignored the instructions when it addressed the Prince Regent on 1 December. The Prince Regent accepted the unification offer on behalf of Peter I of Serbia, and the Kingdom of Serbs, Croats and Slovenes was established without any agreement on the conditions of the union.

The new kingdom had no constitution for more than two years – until the Vidovdan Constitution was adopted in 1921, defining the kingdom as a centralised state. Whenever there was any discussion about revising the constitution in the interwar period, the model proposed by the Geneva Declaration was proposed as an interim solution. In 1932, three years after introduction of the 6 January Dictatorship, Trumbić drafted the Zagreb Points – a political declaration against Serb hegemony. In the text, Trumbić called to "returning to the point of origin" of the state. In subsequent legal proceedings, authorities accused declaration signatories, pointing to that phrase, that they were plotting to introduce the political system envisaged by the Geneva Declaration. One of the signatories, the Croatian Peasant Party leader Vladko Maček defended himself before the court arguing that he did not approve of the principles of the Geneva Declaration, but elsewhere claimed that the "Geneva Pact would be quite suitable".

== Sources ==
- Banac, Ivo (1984). The National Question in Yugoslavia: Origins, History, Politics. Ithaca: Cornell University Press. ISBN 0-8014-1675-2.
- Bataković, Dušan T. (2019). "Serbia 1914–1918. War Imposed, Martyrdom, Resurrection". In Pavlović, Vojislav G. (ed.). Serbia and Italy in the Great War. Belgrade: Institute for Balkan Studies. pp. 11–42. ISBN 9788671791038.
- Biondich, Mark (2000). Stjepan Radić, the Croat Peasant Party, and the Politics of Mass Mobilization, 1904–1928. Toronto, Canada: University of Toronto Press. ISBN 0-8020-4727-0.
- Janković, Dragoslav (1964). "Ženevska konferencija o stvaranju jugoslovenske zajednice 1918. godine" [Geneva Conference on Creation of the Yugoslav Community in 1918]. Istorija XX veka [History of the 20th Century] (in Serbian). Vol. V. Belgrade: Institute of Legal History of the University of Belgrade Faculty of Law. pp. 225–262. OCLC 67000822.
- Jelavich, Charles; Jelavich, Barbara (2000). The Establishment of the Balkan National States, 1804–1920. Seattle: University of Washington Press. ISBN 0-295-96413-8.
- Matijević, Zlatko (2008). "Narodno vijeće Slovenaca, Hrvata i Srba u Zagrebu: Osnutak, djelovanje i nestanak (1918/1919)" [National Council of Slovenes, Croats and Serbs in Zagreb: Founding, Actions and Disappearance (1918/1919)]. Fontes: Izvori Za Hrvatsku Povijest (in Croatian). 14 (1). Zagreb: Croatian State Archives: 35–66. ISSN 1330-6804.
- Pavlović, Vojislav G (2019). "Italy and the Creation of Yugoslavia. Delenda Austria?". In Pavlović, Vojislav G. (ed.). Serbia and Italy in the Great War. Belgrade: Institute for Balkan Studies. pp. 245–278. ISBN 9788671791038.
- Pavlowitch, Kosta St. (2003). "The First World War and Unification of Yugoslavia". In Djokic, Dejan (ed.). Yugoslavism: Histories of a Failed Idea, 1918–1992. London: C. Hurst & Co. pp. 27–41. ISBN 1-85065-663-0.
- Ramet, Sabrina P. (2006). The Three Yugoslavias: State-building and Legitimation, 1918–2005. Bloomington: Indiana University Press. ISBN 9780253346568.
- Sovilj, Milan P. (2018). "About Yugoslavia on the Eve of Its Establishment: Nikola Pašić and British Prime Minister David Lloyd George About the Future Yugoslav State on 15th October 1918". Sociološki pregled Социолошки преглед. 52 (4). Belgrade: Serbian Sociological Society: 1335–1351. doi:10.5937/socpreg52-18428. ISSN 0085-6320.
- Šepić, Dragovan (1968). "The Question of Yugoslav Union in 1918". Journal of Contemporary History. 3 (4). SAGE Publishing: 29–43. doi:10.1177/002200946800300403. ISSN 0022-0094. JSTOR 259849. S2CID 159110607.
- Štambuk-Škalić, Marina; Matijević, Zlatko, eds. (2008). "Narodno vijeće Slovenaca, Hrvata i Srba u Zagrebu 1918–1919. (izabrani dokumenti)" [National Council of Slovenes, Croats and Serbs in Zagreb 1918–1919 (Selected Documents)]. Fontes: Izvori Za Hrvatsku Povijest (in Croatian). 14 (1). Zagreb: Croatian State Archives: 71–596. ISSN 1330-6804.
- Tucker, Spencer C. (1998). The Great War, 1914–18. London: UCL Press. ISBN 1-85728-390-2.
