= Nikola Stojanović (politician, born 1880) =

Bosnian Serb and Yugoslavian politician and lawyer (1880 – 1964)

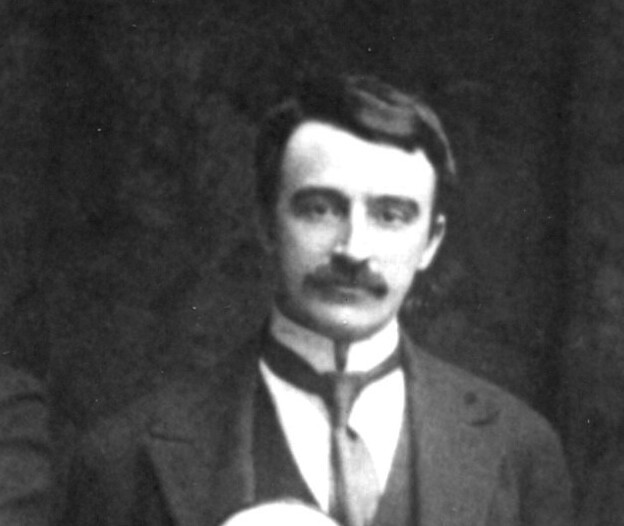
- Nikola Stojanović in 1916
- Born: 3 January 1880; Mostar, Bosnia and Herzegovina, Austria-Hungary (now Bosnia and Herzegovina)
- Died: 5 March 1964 (aged 84); Belgrade, Yugoslavia (now Serbia)
- Education: University of Vienna
- Occupations: Politician, lawyer
- Political party: Serb National Organisation

Nikola Stojanović (3 January 1880 – 5 March 1964) was a lawyer and Bosnian Serb and Yugoslavian politician. As a student, he wrote the article Serbs and Croats, printed in the Serbian Literary Herald, applying Social Darwinism and claiming that Serbs as 'superior people' would eventually assimilate the Croats. In the text, Stojanović announced war to extermination of either Serbs or Croats and the text has been cited as the blueprint for ethnic cleansing by Croatian writers. Following a politically motivated reprint of the article in Srbobran, the newspaper of the Serb Independent Party in Zagreb, it led to 1902 riots targeting Serb businesses and homes in the city, involving a crowd of about 20,000.

Stojanović became a member of the Serb National Organisation political party in Bosnia and Herzegovina and its representative in the Diet of Bosnia. He called for the end of the Austro-Hungarian rule in Bosnia and Herzegovina and annexation of the land by Serbia as a part of its access to the Adriatic Sea through Dalmatia. Serbian prime minister Nikola Pašić directed Stojanović to contact émigré Croatian politicians Ante Trumbić and Julije Gazzari to form a body which would promote unification of South Slavs through expansion of Serbia. The group was established as the Yugoslav Committee with Stojanović was one of its founding members. Trumbić and Stojanović came into conflict with Pašić. While the former disagreed with Pašić on the issue of federation or greater centralisation, while the latter might have objected to the proposed state being a monarchy. Stojanović opposed the Corfu Declaration on unification which affirmed that the union would be a monarchy ruled by the Karađorđević dynasty. Stojanović was a part of the Yugoslav Committee's delegation which negotiated and the signed short-lived Geneva Declaration defining the future common confederal state. Despite initiatives calling on the National Council of Bosnia and Herzegovina to proclaim direct unification with Serbia similarly to the Podgorica Assembly, the council remained passive on Stojanović's instructions. At the Paris Peace Conference (1919–1920), Stojanović was a representative of the newly proclaimed Kingdom of Serbs, Croats and Slovenes as an expert for Bosnia and Herzegovina.

In the interwar period, Stojanović pursued the career of an attorney. Upon the establishment of the Serbian Cultural Club in Belgrade in 1937, Stojanović joined the organisation. He was a part of a group tasked with drafting the organisation's rules of procedure and formulating its objectives. The Serbian Cultural Club took the leading role in shaping of the Greater Serbian ideology in the period. It also shaped the political programme of the Chetniks led by Draža Mihailović. In the summer of 1941, Stojanović started working for Mihailović in his Belgrade office and formally joined the Central National Committee in August 1943. That year, Nazi German authorities arrested him and took him to occupied France where Stojanović remained until the end of the war. He returned to the Communist Yugoslavia after the war. He was tried and convicted for his political work.

== Early life ==
Nikola Stojanović was a Bosnian Serb born in Mostar, in the Condominium of Bosnia and Herzegovina on 3 January 1880. He studied law at the University of Vienna.

== Serbs and Croats ==
While still a student, Stojanović published an anonymous (subsequently attributed) article titled Serbs and Croats (Serbian: Срби и Хрвати) in the Serbian Literary Herald. In the article, he claimed Serbs would eventually assimilate Croats because the latter had inferior culture and lower national awareness prevented their development as a full-fledged nation. Stojanović asserted that Croats cannot be a distinct nation because they lacked a separate language, unified customs and lifestyle. In the text, Stojanović announced war to extermination "ours or yours", meaning Serbs and Croats respectively. The phrase, likely meant as a call to cultural war where Croats would be seduced by the Serbian national identity, resonated well not only with Serbian, but also Croatian nationalists (as its topics were similar to those tackled by the former leader of Croatian Party of Rights Ante Starčević. The article brought little new to the political discourse of the day, except the call to a war, and the phrase of "war to extermination of ours or yours" would be echoed in Yugoslav politics since then. Stojanović's article applied Social Darwinism to model Serbian approach to non-Serbs and became cited as the blueprint for ethnic cleansing by Croatian writers. In his text, Stojanović dismissed the Illyrian movement championed by Ljudevit Gaj as an effort of the House of Habsburg to contain Hungary, as well as the Yugoslavism advocated by bishop Josip Juraj Strossmayer and Starčević's Croatian nationalism as reactions to Serbian rejection of Illyrism seeking to promote Habsburg and Roman Catholic interests in the Balkans. He based the rejection, as well as the concept of inevitable assimilation, on chauvinist belief that Serbs are the superior in every aspect. Despite the patronizing tone of the text, Political scientist David Bruce MacDonald argues that Stojanović wanted to unite Croatia with Serbia, thereby allowing Croatia to secure "economic, political and cultural independence, and freedom from German encroachment", with the goal of rallying the two against the threat of external powers.

The article gained prominence when it was reprinted in Srbobran newspaper of the Serb Independent Party in Zagreb. The reprinting was arranged, as prime minister Kálmán Tisza implied, by Hungarian authorities in Budapest. The move was in response to the harassment of the government of Ban Károly Khuen-Héderváry by political activists organised by Stjepan Radić. The purpose of the move was to incite ethnic hatred between Croatian Serbs and Croats as a form of the divide and rule policy. Party of Rights newspaper Obzor quoted Stojanović, concluding that the war to extermination has been announced. Josip Frank, the most prominent Croatian nationalist and leader of the Pure Party of Rights, collaborated with the Hungarian authorities and called his followers to the streets. The ensuing riots targeting Serb businesses and homes in Zagreb were welcomed by Frank and denounced by Radić, as well as the entire Croatian opposition. Nonetheless, Radić also indirectly implied Croats should cease business dealings with Serbs. About 20,000 people rioted, largely urged and well-organised by the Frankists, but many others joined in. A substantial portion of the public interpreted the riots as a result of Habsburg and Hungarian efforts to ensure a dominant position in Croatia-Slavonia by preventing unity of Croats and Serbs. The damage caused by the rioters was paid by the city and charged to taxpayers as a 3.5% tax.

== Yugoslav Committee ==
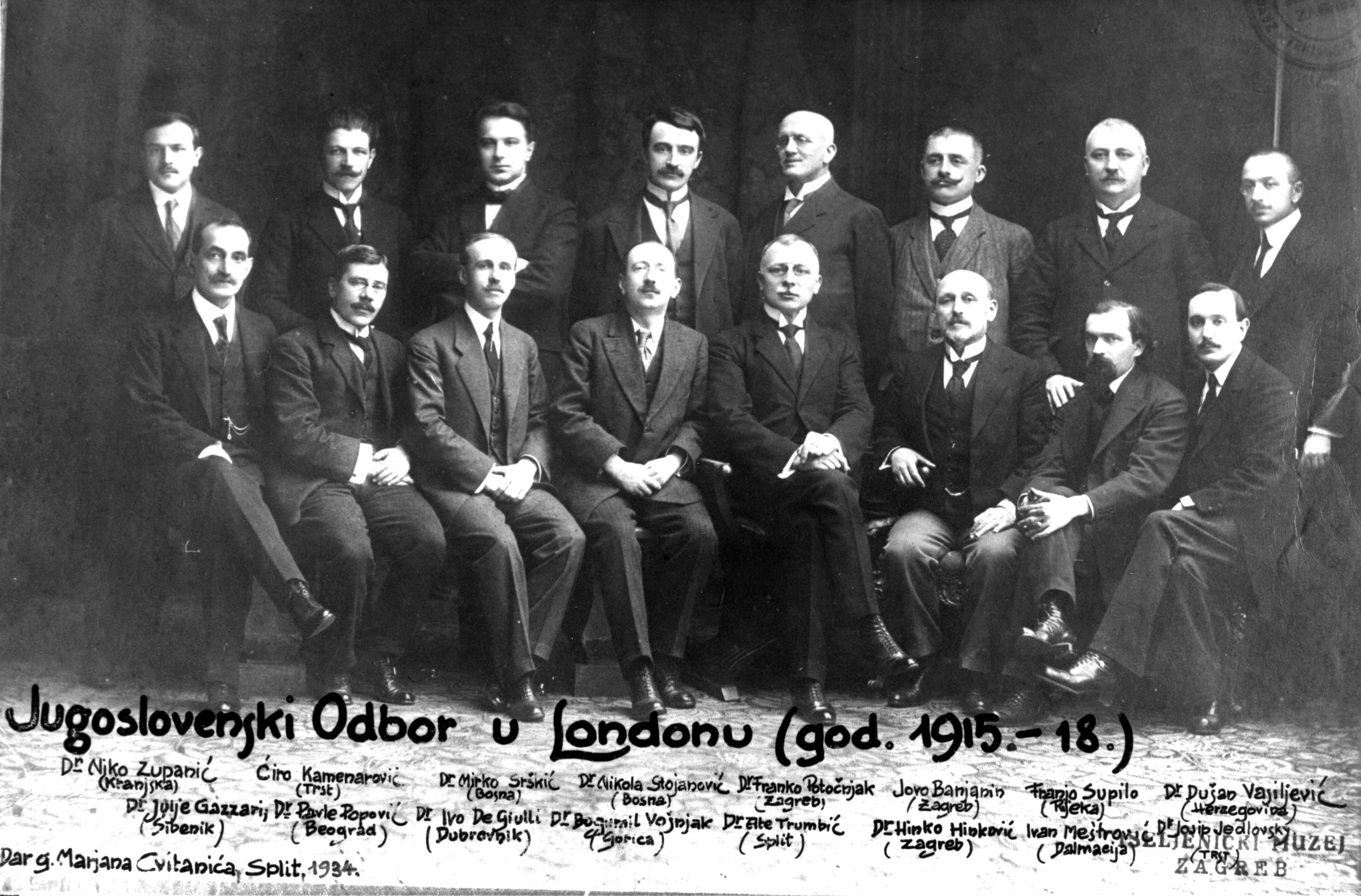
Yugoslav Committee photographed in Paris in 1916; Nikola Stojanović is standing, the fourth from the left

Stojanović joined the Serb National Organisation and successfully ran as the party's candidate, becoming a member of the Diet of Bosnia elected in the 1910 Bosnian parliamentary election. As a member of the Bosnian Diet, Stojanović advocated the position that the Austro-Hungarian rule in Bosnia and Herzegovina should end and that Bosnia and Herzegovina should be added to the Kingdom of Serbia. Furthermore, Stojanović held that Serbia should gain access to the Adriatic Sea through Dalmatia. At the outbreak of the World War I, Stojanović was in Serbia. There he took part in formulation of Serbian war objectives formulated as the 1914 Niš Declaration. Serbian prime minister Nikola Pašić directed Stojanović, and a fellow-Bosnian Serb member of the Diet of Bosnia Dušan Vasiljević to contact émigré Croatian politicians and lawyers Ante Trumbić and Julije Gazzari with the aim of establishing a body which would cooperate with the government of Serbia on unification of South Slavs in a state created through expansion of Serbia. The group's policy was to be set entirely by Serbia while the proposed body would carry out propaganda activities. The four met in Florence on 22 November 1914. The group was formally established as the Yugoslav Committee in Paris, and Stojanović was one of its founding members.

Stojanović took the position that if unification of South Slavs becomes impossible, in case of a negotiated end of the war, Serbia should capture Bosnia and Herzegovina to reverse Austro-Hungarian annexation of 1908 and to gain territory in Dalmatia as an access to the sea. Nonetheless, Stojanović came into conflict with Pašić following the Salonika Trial and execution of Dragutin Dimitrijević, convicted as the lead conspirator against Prince Regent Alexander and organiser of an attempted assassination of the Regent. It remains unclear why exactly the two were in conflict, except that it coincided with conclusion of the trial. Some sources indicate that the conflict might stem from Stojanović's alleged preference for a republic, contrary to Pašić's ideas. Stojanović voiced opposition, without specifying reasons, to the Corfu Declaration on unification signed by Pašić and Yugoslav Committee president Trumbić—affirming that the new union will be a monarchy ruled by the Karađorđević dynasty. As the conflict with Pašić deteriorated, Stojanović had Serb members of the Yugoslav Committee (Vasiljević and Pero Slijepčević—substituting Milan Srškić who quit the committee in protest) declare they support only unification of South Slavs on the integral Yugoslavist basis, and would not support just addition of Bosnia and Herzegovina to Serbia.

In November 1918, Stojanović was a part of the Yugoslav Committee's delegation which negotiated and signed the Geneva Declaration with Pašić, representatives of the Serbian parliamentary opposition, and a delegation of the National Council of the State of Slovenes, Croats and Serbs—newly established polity of South Slavs on the territory of the recently dissolved Austria-Hungary. Pašić was isolated and compelled to concede to the establishment of a common government, where the National Council and the government of Serbia would appoint an equal number of ministers to govern a common confederal state. Pašić only consented after receiving a message from the President of France Raymond Poincaré that he wished Pašić to come to an agreement with the National Council. A week later, the Serbian government renounced the Declaration. Vice president of the National Council, Croatian Serb politician Svetozar Pribičević supported the repudiation of the Geneva Agreement and successfully swayed the National Council against the position negotiated by Trumbić. Pribičević persuaded the Council members to proceed with unification and that details could be arranged afterwards.

Despite initiatives calling on the National Council of Bosnia and Herzegovina to proclaim direct unification with Serbia similarly to the Podgorica Assembly, the council's president Atanasije Šola declined to act in that way. Instead, he accepted Stojanović's instructions and remained passive to allow Bosnia and Herzegovina be added to the new unified state through actions of the National Council of the State of Slovenes, Croats and Serbs in Zagreb. At the Paris Peace Conference (1919–1920), Stojanović was a representative of the newly proclaimed Kingdom of Serbs, Croats and Slovenes as an expert for Bosnia and Herzegovina.

== Serbian Cultural Club ==
After 1920, Stojanović pursued the career of an attorney. Upon establishment of the Serbian Cultural Club in Belgrade in 1937, Stojanović joined the organisation. According to various sources, he was appointed one of its vice-presidents and/or an honorary member, and he was in a group tasked with drafting the organisation's rules of procedure, as well as formulating its objectives. The Serbian Cultural Club assumed the leading role in shaping of the Greater Serbian ideology in the period. It also significantly influenced the political programme of the Chetniks led by Draža Mihailović. On 1 April 1941, king Peter II of Yugoslavia appointed Stojanović Ban (head) of Vrbas Banovina—days before the Invasion of Yugoslavia by the Axis powers of the World War II. In the summer of 1941, Stojanović started to work for Mihailović in his Belgrade office and formally joined the Central National Committee in August 1943.

== Later life ==
Later in 1943, Nazi German authorities in the Territory of the Military Commander in Serbia arrested him and took him to occupied France where Stojanović remained until the end of the war. He returned to the Communist Yugoslavia after the war. He was tried and convicted for his political work to imprisonment, commuted to ten years of loss of civil rights. He died in Belgrade on 5 March 1964.

== Sources ==
- Artuković, Mato (2010). "Pitanje šteta i odštete u antisrpskim demonstracijama 1902. godine" [The Question of Damages and Compensation in the Anti-Serb Demonstrations of 1902]. Časopis za suvremenu povijest (in Croatian). 42 (1). Zagreb: Croatian Institute for History: 179–217. ISSN 0590-9597.
- Banac, Ivo (1984). The National Question in Yugoslavia: Origins, History, Politics. Ithaca: Cornell University Press. ISBN 0-8014-1675-2.
- Boban, Branka (2019). "Stavovi hrvatske političke elite prema stvaranju jugoslavenske države" [Attitudes of Croatian political elite towards formation of the Yugoslav state]. Tragovi: časopis za srpske i hrvatske teme (in Croatian). 2 (2). Zagreb: Serb National Council: 8–98. doi:10.52328/t. ISSN 2623-8926.
- Glenny, Misha (2012). The Balkans, 1804–2012: Nationalism, War and the Great Powers. Toronto: House of Anansi Press. ISBN 978-1-77089-273-6.
- Janković, Dragoslav (1964). "Ženevska konferencija o stvaranju jugoslovenske zajednice 1918. godine" [Geneva Conference on Creation of the Yugoslav Community in 1918]. Istorija XX veka [History of the 20th Century] (in Serbian). Vol. V. Belgrade: Institute of Legal History of the University of Belgrade Faculty of Law. pp. 225–262. OCLC 67000822.
- Mastilović, Draga (2012). "Др Никола Стојановић између српства и југословенства" [Dr Nikola Stojanović between Serbia and Yugoslavia]. Зборник за историју Босне и Херцеговине (in Serbian) (7). Belgrade: Serbian Academy of Sciences and Arts: 267–299. ISSN 0354-9461.
- MacDonald, David Bruce (2002). Balkan Holocausts?: Serbian and Croatian Victim Centered Propaganda and the War in Yugoslavia. Manchester: Manchester University Press. ISBN 9780719064678. JSTOR j.ctt155jbrm.9.
- Miller, Nicholas J. (1998). Between Nation and State: Serbian Politics in Croatia Before the First World War. Pittsburgh: University of Pittsburgh Press. ISBN 9780822977223.
- Nadoveza, Branko (2015). "Политичка мисао Николе Стојановића о организацији прве југословенске државе" [On Political Thought of Nikola Stojanovic Regarding Organization of First Yugoslav State]. Политичка ревија (in Serbian). 43 (1). Belgrade: Institute for Political Studies: 103–120. doi:10.22182/pr.4312015.7. ISSN 1451-4281.
- Štambuk-Škalić, Marina; Matijević, Zlatko, eds. (2008). "Narodno vijeće Slovenaca, Hrvata i Srba u Zagrebu 1918–1919. (izabrani dokumenti)" [National Council of Slovenes, Croats and Serbs in Zagreb 1918–1919 (Selected Documents)]. Fontes: Izvori Za Hrvatsku Povijest (in Croatian). 14 (1). Zagreb: Croatian State Archives: 71–596. ISSN 1330-6804.
- Sušić, Osman (2020). "Bosna i Hercegovina u koncepcijama Srpskog kulturnog kluba" [Bosnia and Herzegovina in Serbian Cultural Club Concepts]. Historijski Pogledi (in Bosnian). 3 (4). Tuzla: Centar za istraživanje moderne i savremene historije: 108–132. doi:10.52259/historijskipogledi.2020.3.4.108. ISSN 2637-1502.
- Zgodić, Esad (2022). "Nikola Stojanović - Prilog kritičkoj historiji socijalne i političke misli u Bosni i Hercegovini" [Nikola Stojanović: Contribution to a critical history of social and political thought in Bosnia and Herzegovina]. Znakovi vremena - Časopis za filozofiju, religiju, znanost i društvenu praksu (in Bosnian). 25 (92/93). Sarajevo: Naučnoistraživački institut "Ibn Sina": 114–145. ISSN 1512-5416.
