= Yugoslav Committee =

South Slavic unification ad hoc body

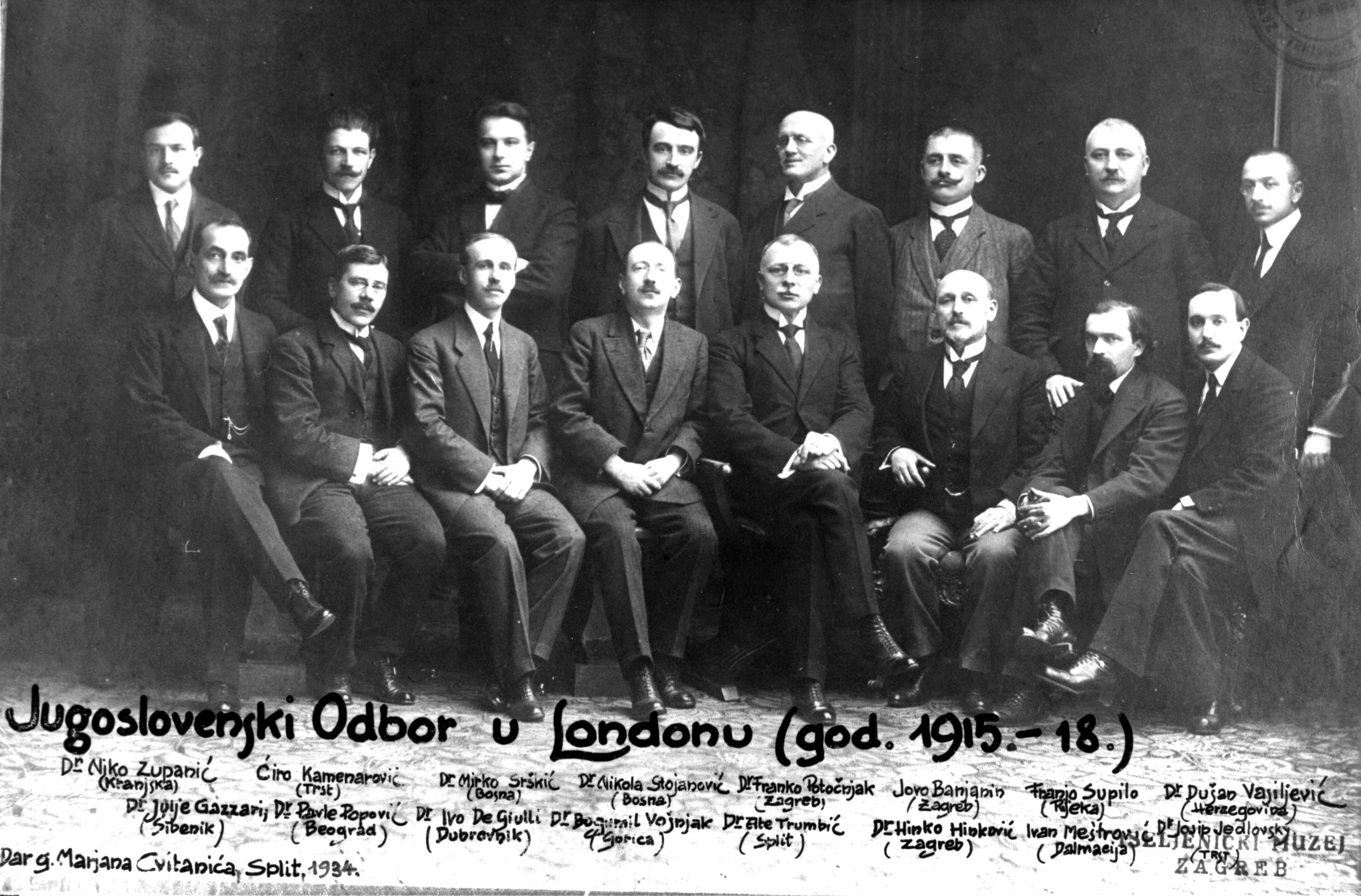
Yugoslav Committee photographed in Paris in 1916

The Yugoslav Committee (Croatian: Jugoslavenski odbor, Slovene: Jugoslovanski odbor, Serbian: Југословенски одбор, romanized: Jugoslovenski odbor) was a World War I–era, unelected, ad-hoc committee. It largely consisted of émigré Croat, Slovene, and Bosnian Serb politicians and political activists whose aim was the detachment of Austro-Hungarian lands inhabited by South Slavs and unification of those lands with the Kingdom of Serbia. The group was formally established in 1915 and last met in 1919, shortly after the breakup of Austria-Hungary and the establishment of the Kingdom of Serbs, Croats and Slovenes, which was later renamed Yugoslavia. The Yugoslav Committee was led by its president, the Croat lawyer Ante Trumbić, and, until 1916, by Croat politician Frano Supilo as its vice president.

The members of the Yugoslav Committee had different positions on topics such as the method of unification, the desired system of government, and the constitution of the proposed union state. The bulk of the committee members espoused various forms of Yugoslavism – advocating for either a centralised state or a federation in which lands constituting the new state would preserve a degree of autonomy. The committee was financially supported by donations from the Croatian diaspora, and by the government of the Kingdom of Serbia, led by Nikola Pašić.

Representatives of the Yugoslav Committee and the Serbian government met on the Greek island of Corfu in 1917; they discussed the proposed unification of South Slavs and produced the Corfu Declaration, outlining some elements of the future union's constitution. Further meetings took place at the end of the war in Geneva in 1918. Those discussions resulted in the Geneva Declaration, which described a confederal constitution of the union. The Government of Serbia repudiated the declaration shortly afterwards. The State of Slovenes, Croats and Serbs, which was formed as Austria-Hungary was breaking up, treated the Yugoslav Committee as its representative in international affairs. The committee soon came under pressure to unify with Serbia and proceeded to do so in a manner that ignored the earlier declarations. It ceased to exist shortly afterwards.

== Background ==
Kingdoms and countries of Austria–Hungary: Cisleithania (Empire of Austria): 1. Bohemia, 2. Bukovina, 3. Carinthia, 4. Carniola, 5. Dalmatia, 6. Galicia, 7. Küstenland, 8. Lower Austria, 9. Moravia, 10. Salzburg, 11. Silesia, 12. Styria, 13. Tyrol, 14. Upper Austria, 15. Vorarlberg; Transleithania (Kingdom of Hungary): 16. Hungary proper 17. Croatia-Slavonia; 18. Bosnia and Herzegovina (Austro-Hungarian condominium)

The idea of South Slavic political unity predates the creation of Yugoslavia by nearly a century. The concept was first developed in Habsburg Croatia by a group of Croat intellectuals who formed the Illyrian movement in the 19th century. It evolved through many forms and proposals. The Illyrian intellectuals argued that Croatian history is a part of a wider history of the South Slavs, and that Croats, Serbs, and potentially Slovenes and Bulgarians were parts of a single "Illyrian" nation, choosing the name as a neutral term. The movement began as a cultural one, promoting Croatian national identity and integration of all Croatian provinces within the Austrian Empire, usually in reference to the Habsburg kingdoms of Croatia, Slavonia, and Dalmatia, and a part or all of Ottoman Bosnia and Herzegovina. A wider aim was to gather all South Slavs or Jugo-Slaveni (Note: Coined by compounding Croatian nouns jug and Slaveni, meaning "South" and "Slavs", respectively.) for short, in a commonwealth within or outside the Empire. The movement's two directions became known as Croatianism and Yugoslavism (Note: Some sources also refer to it as the Yugoslav nationalism, or Yugoslavdom.) respectively, meant to counter Germanisation and Magyarisation.

Fearing the Drang nach Osten (drive to the east), the Illyrians believed Germanisation and Magyarisation could only be resisted through unity with other Slavs, especially the Serbs. They advocated for the unification of Croatia, Slavonia, and Dalmatia as the Triune Kingdom. The concept was expanded to encompass other South Slavs in Austria or Austria-Hungary after the Compromise of 1867, before aspiring to join other South Slavic polities in a federation or confederation. The proposed consolidation of variously defined Croatian or South Slavic lands led to proposals for trialism in Austria-Hungary, accommodating a South-Slavic polity with a rank equal to the Kingdom of Hungary.

After the neighbouring Kingdom of Serbia achieved independence through the 1878 Treaty of Berlin, the Yugoslav idea became irrelevant in that country. Before the First Balkan War in 1912, Serbia was mono-ethnic and Serbian nationalists sought to include those they considered to be Serbs into the state. It portrayed the work of bishops Josip Juraj Strossmayer and Franjo Rački as a scheme to establish a Greater Croatia. A group of Royal Serbian Army officers known as the Black Hand exerted pressure to expand Serbia; they carried out a May 1903 coup that brought the Karađorđević dynasty to power and then organised nationalist actions in the "unredeemed Serbian provinces", specified as Bosnia, Herzegovina, Montenegro, an Old Serbia – meaning Kosovo – Macedonia, Central Croatia, Slavonia, Syrmia, Vojvodina, and Dalmatia. This echoed Garašanin's 1844 Načertanije, a treatise that anticipated the dissolution of the Ottoman Empire, and which called for the establishment of Greater Serbia to pre-empt Russian or Austrian expansion into the Balkans by unifying all Serbs into a single state.

In the first two decades of the 20th century, Croat, Serb, and Slovene national programmes adopted Yugoslavism in different, conflicting, or mutually exclusive forms. Yugoslavism became a pivotal idea for the establishment of a South Slavic political union. Most Serbs equated the idea with Greater Serbia or a vehicle to bring all Serbs into a single state. For many Croats and Slovenes, Yugoslavism protected them against Austrian and Hungarian challenges to the preservation of their own national identities and political autonomy.

== Prelude ==
=== Florence meeting ===
Military alliances in Europe in 1914 Triple Entente Triple Alliance

In October 1914, Serbian Prime Minister Nikola Pašić learnt the Government of the United Kingdom was considering expanding the alliance against the Central Powers, which at that time consisted of the German Empire and Austria-Hungary. The UK intended to persuade Hungary to secede from Austria-Hungary and to persuade the Kingdom of Italy to abandon its neutrality so both countries could join the alliance of the UK, France, and Russia that was known as the Entente Powers. Pašić discovered the UK was considering guaranteeing Hungarian access to the Adriatic Sea through the Port of Rijeka and overland access to Rijeka over Croatian soil, and resolving the Adriatic Question satisfactorily for Italy. Pašić thought these developments, coupled with a potential UK–Romanian alliance, would threaten Serbia and jeopardise the Serbian objective of gaining access to the Adriatic.

In response, Pašić directed two Bosnian Serb members of the Austro-Hungarian Diet of Bosnia, Nikola Stojanović and Dušan Vasiljević, to contact the émigré Croatian politicians and lawyers Ante Trumbić and Julije Gazzari, in order to resist the pro-Hungarian British proposals and to create a Slavic alternative. Pašić proposed the establishment of a body that would cooperate with the Government of Serbia on the unification of South Slavs in a state that would be created through the expansion of Serbia. The policy of expansion was to be set and controlled entirely by Serbia, and the proposed body would carry out propaganda activities on its behalf. The four men met in Florence, Italy, on 22 November 1914. In January 1915, Frano Supilo, who was once a leading figure in the Croat-Serb Coalition, the ruling political party of the Austro-Hungarian realm of Croatia-Slavonia, (Note: Supilo co-founded the Croat-Serb Coalition with Svetozar Pribićević but left it following the Agram Trial and especially the Friedjung Trial initiated by the coalition and Supilo was disappointed in a lack of support from the coalition. He was replaced by Ivan Lorković as co-chairman of the coalition. The move left Pribićević in effective control of the coalition.) met with British foreign secretary Sir Edward Grey and Prime Minister H. H. Asquith, providing them with the manifesto of the nascent Yugoslav Committee and discussing the benefits of South Slavic unification. The manifesto was co-written by Supilo and British political activist and historian Robert Seton-Watson.

=== Niš Declaration ===
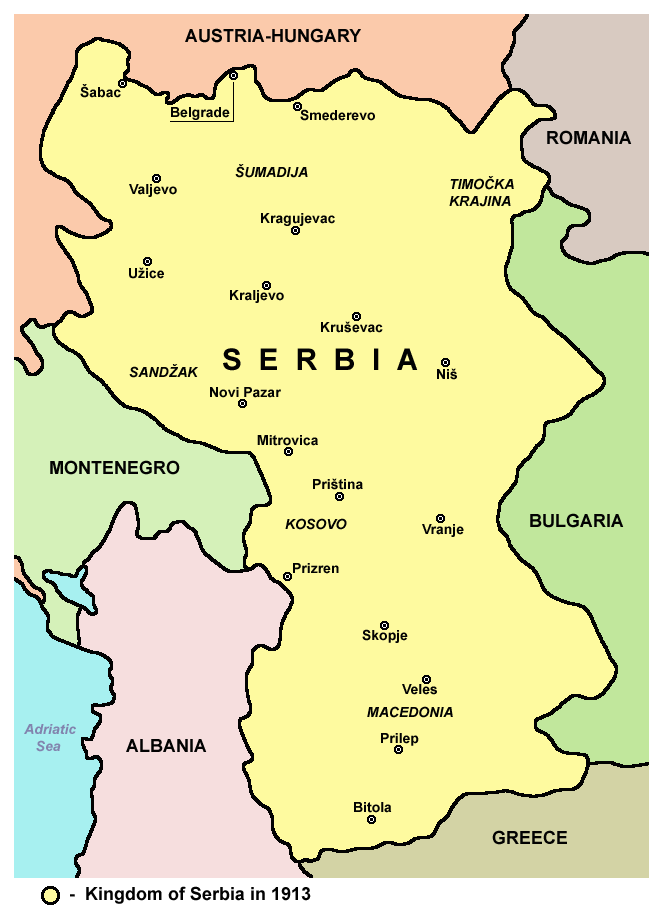
Map of the Kingdom of Serbia before the World War I

The Serbian leadership considered World War I to be an opportunity for territorial expansion beyond the Serb-inhabited areas of the Balkans. A committee that was tasked with determining the country's war aims produced a program to establish a single South-Slavic state through the addition of Croatia-Slavonia, the Slovene Lands, Vojvodina, Bosnia and Herzegovina, and Dalmatia. Pašić thought the process should be implemented through the addition of new territories to Serbia. On 7 December, Serbia announced its war aims in the Niš Declaration. The declaration called on South Slavs to struggle to liberate and unify "unliberated brothers", "three tribes of one people" – referring to Serbs, Croats, and Slovenes. This formulation was adopted instead of an explicit goal of territorial expansion as a way to attract support from South Slavs living in Austria-Hungary. The Serbian government wanted to appeal to fellow South Slavs because it feared little material support would be delivered from its Entente Powers allies as it became clear the war would not be short. Serbia assumed a central role in the state-building of the future South Slavic polity, with support from the major Entente Powers.

Supilo initially assumed the Niš Declaration meant Serbia was fully supportive of his ideas on the method of unification. He was convinced otherwise by Russian foreign minister Sergey Sazonov, who informed Supilo that Russia only supported the creation of Greater Serbia. As a result, Supilo and Trumbić did not trust Pašić, and considered him a proponent of Serbian hegemony. Despite the mistrust, Supilo and Trumbić wanted to work with Pašić to further the aim of South-Slavic unification. Pašić offered to work with them towards the establishment of a Serbo-Croat state in which Croats would be given some concessions, an offer they declined. Trumbić was convinced the Serbian leadership thought of unification as a means to conquer neighbouring territories for Serbian gain.

Trumbić and Supilo found another reason to distrust Pašić when Pašić dispatched envoys to address Sazonov's opposition to the addition of Roman Catholic South Slavs to the proposed South Slavic union. The envoys wrote a memorandum claiming Croats only inhabit the north of Central Croatia, and that the regions of Slavonia, Krbava, Lika, Bačka, and Banat should be added to Serbia, as well as the previously claimed Dalmatia, and Bosnia and Herzegovina. Trumbić and Supilo became convinced that because of the Government of Serbia's expansionist policy, the proposed unification would be perceived within Croatian-inhabited areas of Austria-Hungary as a Serbian conquest rather than as a liberation. They decided to proceed with caution, gather political support abroad, and to refrain from the establishment of a Yugoslav Committee until Italy's entry into the war became certain.

=== Treaty of London ===
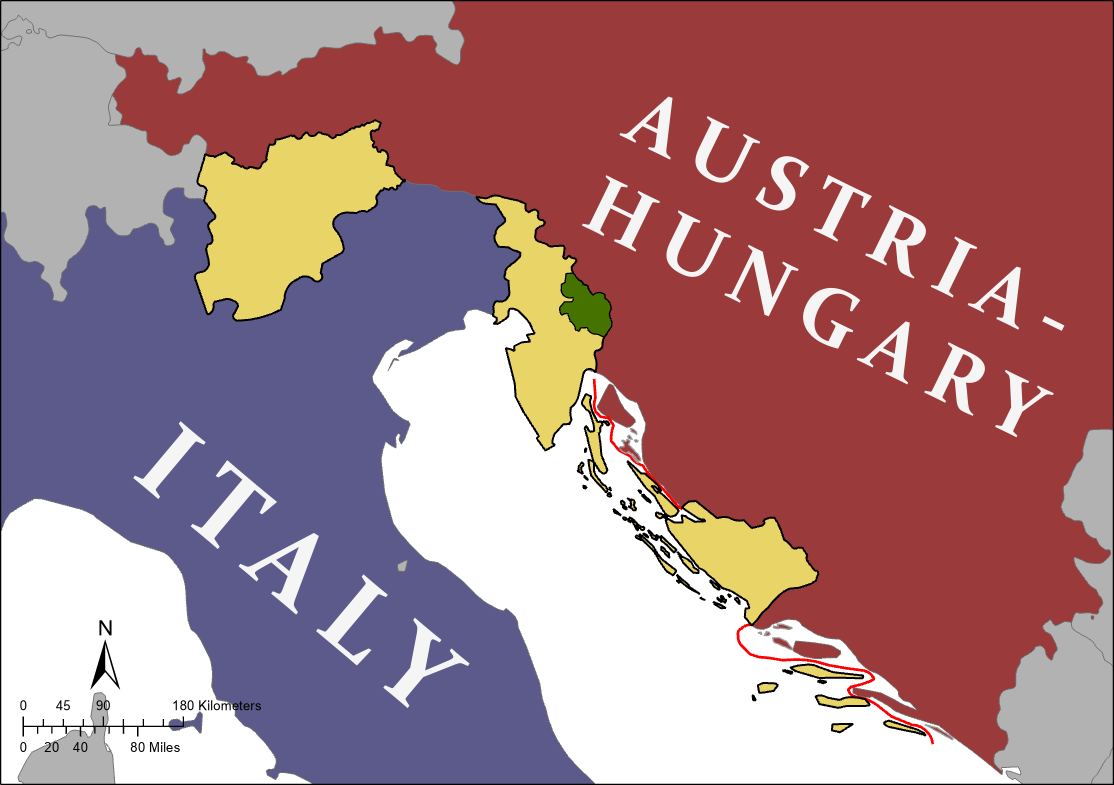
Territories promised to Italy by the Entente in the South Tyrol, the Austrian Littoral, and Dalmatia (tan), and the Snežnik Plateau area (green).

The Entente Powers ultimately concluded an alliance with Italy by offering it large areas of Austria-Hungary that were inhabited by South Slavs, mostly Croats and Slovenes, along the eastern shores of the Adriatic Sea. The offer was formalised as the 1915 Treaty of London, and caused Trumbić and Supilo to reconsider their criticism of Serbian policies. This was because they saw potential Serbian war success against Austria-Hungary as the only realistic safeguard against Italian expansion into the Slovene-and-Croat-inhabited lands. Supilo was convinced Croatia would be partitioned between Italy, Serbia, and Hungary if the Treaty of London was to be implemented.

The matter became closely related to the Entente's simultaneous efforts to obtain an alliance with Bulgaria, or at least to secure its neutrality, in return for territorial gains against Serbia. As compensation, Serbia was promised territories that were within Austria-Hungary at the time: Bosnia and Herzegovina and an outlet to the Adriatic Sea in Dalmatia. Regardless of the promised compensation, Pašić was reluctant to accede to all of the Bulgarian territorial demands, especially before Serbia had secured the new territories. Supilo obtained British support for plebiscites in Bosnia and Herzegovina and Dalmatia so the populace of those territories would decide on their own fate rather than Britain supplying guarantees of westward territorial expansion to Serbia. Crucially, Serbia received Russian support for its dismissal of the proposed land swap.

== Establishment ==
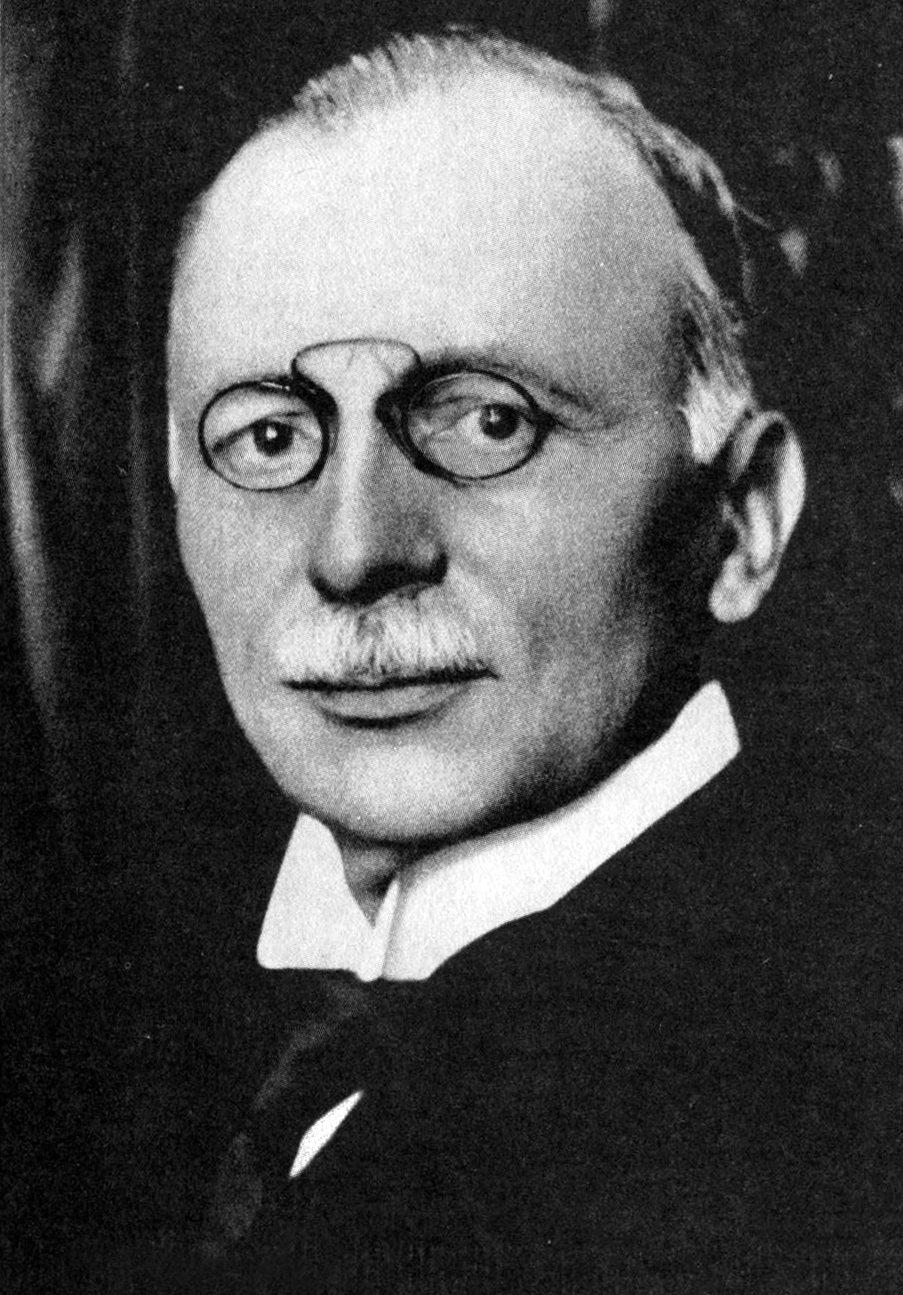
Ante Trumbić led the Yugoslav Committee in the run-up to creation of Yugoslavia

The Yugoslav Committee was formally founded in the Hôtel Madison, Paris, on 30 April 1915, a few days after signing of the London Agreement ensuring Italy's entry into the World War I. The committee designated London as its seat. The committee was an unelected, ad-hoc group of anti-Habsburg politicians and activists who had fled Austria-Hungary when World War I broke out. The committee's work was largely funded by members of the Croatian diaspora, including Gazzari's brother and the Croatian-Chilean industrialist Remigio. A portion of the costs were covered by the Government of Serbia.

Trumbić became the Yugoslav Committee president and Supilo its vice-president. The committee also included Croatian Sabor members sculptor Ivan Meštrović, Hinko Hinković, Jovan Banjanin, and Franko Potočnjak; Diet of Istria member Dinko Trinajstić; Diet of Bosnia members Stojanović and Vasiljević; Imperial Council member Gustav Gregorin; writer Milan Marjanović; literary historian Pavle Popović; ethnologist Niko Županič; jurist Bogumil Vošnjak; Miće Mičić; and Gazzari. Later, the membership also included Milan Srškić, Ante Biankini, Mihajlo Pupin, Lujo Bakotić, Ivan De Giulli, Niko Gršković, Josip Jedlowski, and Josip Mandić. Prominent non-member supporters included Rikard Katalinić Jeretov and Josip Marohnić, the latter being the president of the North American Croatian Fraternal Union, which collected money for the Yugoslav Committee. The committee's central London office was led by Hinković and Jedlowski. According to some sources, Jedlowski used the title of secretary of the committee, although it appears the position was an administrative one that conferred no special authority.

Members of the Yugoslav Committee believed the Croatian question could only be resolved through the abolition of Austria-Hungary and Croatia's unification with Serbia. Trumbić and Supilo were proponents of a political unification of South Slavs within a single nation-state through the realisation of Yugoslavist ideas. They believed the South Slavs were one people who were entitled to a national homeland through the principle of self-determination and advocated for unification based on equality. He advocated for the establishment of a federal state within which Slovene Lands, Croatia (consisting of pre-war Croatia-Slavonia and Dalmatia), Bosnia and Herzegovina, Serbia (expanded to include Vojvodina), and Montenegro would become the five constituent elements. Croat members of the Yugoslav Committee, except Hinković, thought the federal units would ensure preservation of the historical, legal, and cultural traditions of the individual parts of the new state. Supilo proposed the new country would be named Yugoslavia to avoid imposing the name of Serbia onto areas of the new country outside of the pre-war Serbian boundaries. He also suggested Croatia should be given some protection against future Serbian dominance and that Zagreb might be the city most suited to becoming the new country's capital. The Yugoslav Committee believed unification should be the result of an agreement between itself and the Government of Serbia.

The Yugoslav Committee attracted support in the UK, especially that of Seton-Watson, journalist and historian Wickham Steed, and archaeologist Arthur Evans. The Entente Powers did not initially consider a breakup of Austria-Hungary as a war aim and did not support the work of the committee, whose activities aimed to undermine the territorial integrity of Austria-Hungary. The Yugoslav Committee worked to be recognised by the Entente Powers as the legal representative of South Slavs living in Austria-Hungary, but Pašić consistently prevented any formal recognition. A further point of friction between Supilo and Trumbić on one side and Pašić on the other was the Serbian ambassador's demand to the UK to ask the Yugoslav Committee to omit any mention of Dalmatia as a part of Croatia since time immemorial, because it might jeopardise Serbian territorial claims. Supilo and Trumbić were surprised but they complied, believing Croatia would be otherwise left defenceless against Italian territorial claims.

== Supilo's resignation ==
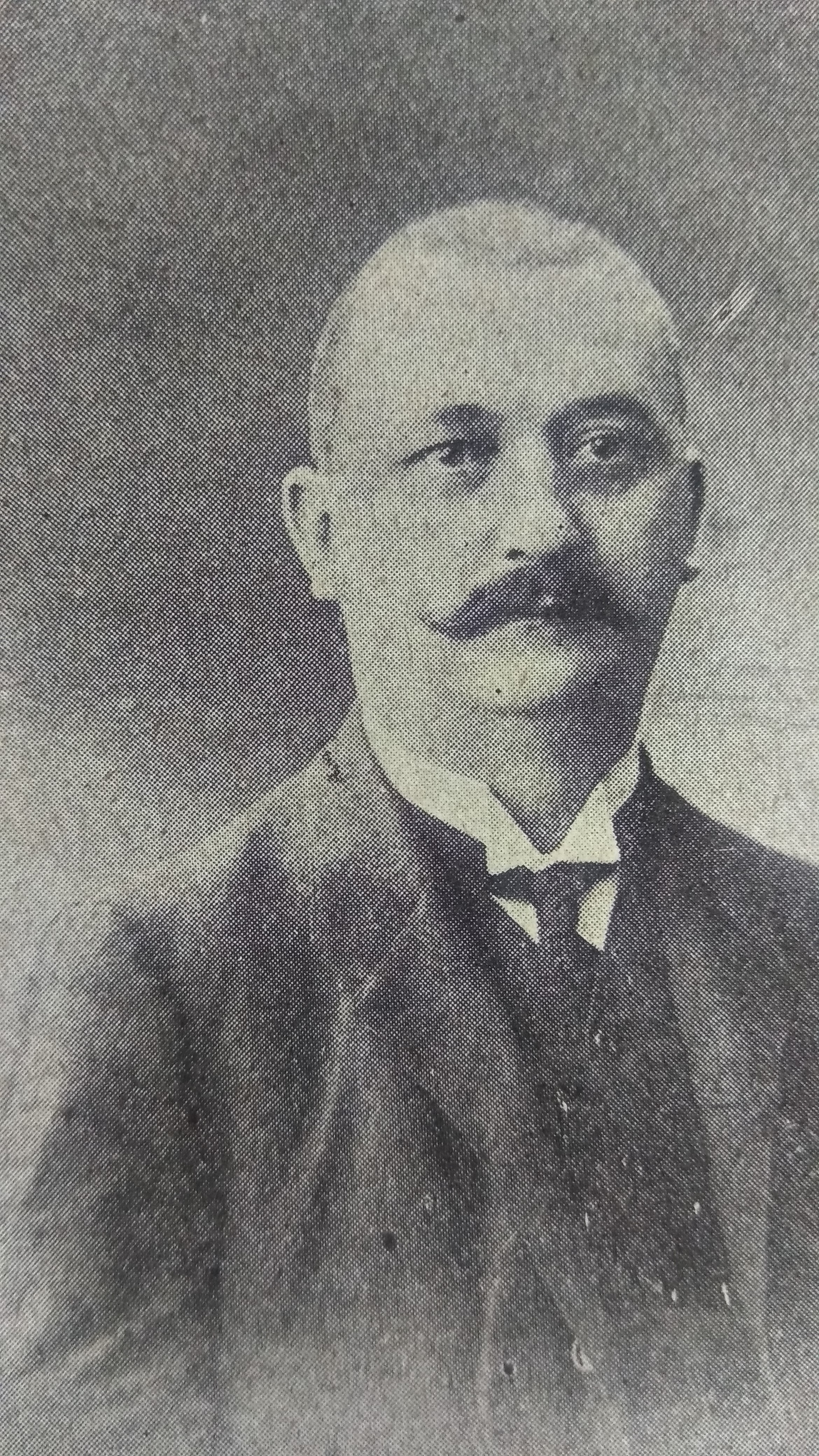
Frano Supilo co-founded the Yugoslav Committee with Ante Trumbić

Supilo thought the Yugoslav Committee had to confront Italian and Hungarian attempts to encroach on lands inhabited by South Slavs and the Greater Serbian expansionist designs pursued by Pašić. While most of the committee agreed with Supilo, they did not want to openly confront Serbia until the South Slavic lands were safe from Italian and Hungarian threats. Following the Serbian military defeat in the 1915 Serbian campaign, Supilo, Gazzari, and Trinajstić concluded the Serb members of the Yugoslav Committee believed the proposed unification should primarily encompass ethnic Serbs in a centralised state and saw no need for a federal system because they deemed differences between Serbs, Croats, and Slovenes to be the artificial result of Austrian rule. Supilo protested by informing the Yugoslav Committee he had sent a memo to Grey, proposing an independent Croatian state should be established unless Serbia agreed to treat Croats and Slovenes as equal to Serbs. His principal complaint was that the Entente Powers thought of Croatia and other Austro-Hungarian territories as compensation to Serbia for the loss of Macedonia and concessions in Banat instead of treating the populations of these areas as equal partners. Serb and Slovene members of the committee accused Supilo and his allies of separatism and favouring Croatian interests over Slovene ones.

Trumbić believed unification should be pursued at all costs providing Austria-Hungary was destroyed. In March 1916, Trumbić dismissed Supilo's idea of establishing a Croatian Committee, fearing it would lead to conflict with the Serbian government and weaken the Croatians' position against Italy. In early May 1916, Pašić declared Serbian recognition of Italian dominance in the Adriatic, causing Gazzari, Trinajstić, and Meštrović to ask for a meeting of the committee. In the meeting, Vasiljević and Stojanović again attacked Supilo for his opposition to the policy of the Serbian government. Supilo left the Yugoslav Committee on 5 June 1916. Supilo, believing the piecemeal approach being taken was wrong and that problems must be immediately dealt with in the open, abandoned integral Yugoslavism and unsuccessfully urged Croat members of the Yugoslav Committee to resign and join him in pursuit of an independent Croatia because Serbia had prioritised uniting ethnic Serbs. He hoped to obtain Italian support for the idea, because Italy was displeased with the prospect of the unification of South Slavs close to its borders, and thereby pressure Pašić and the Serbs into giving into his demands.

Relations between the Yugoslav Committee and Serbia did not improve after Supilo's departure. A new contentious issue was the designation of the South Slavic volunteer units established in Odesa. These consisted of prisoners of war who had been captured from Austria-Hungary by Russia and now wanted to fight against the Austro-Hungarians on the side of Slavic independence. While the Yugoslav Committee wanted the force to be called Yugoslav, Pašić successfully arranged through Serbian diplomatic mission in Russia to have the unit named the First Serbian Volunteer Division, which was commanded by officers of the Royal Serbian Army who were sent to Russia for the task. While the committee hoped the force would help promote a common Yugoslav identity, Yugoslavism was actively suppressed by the officers, on instructions given by Pašić. As a result, 12,735 of 33,000 volunteers left the force in protest at its specifically Serbian identification, and recruitment of volunteers significantly slowed.

== Corfu Declaration ==
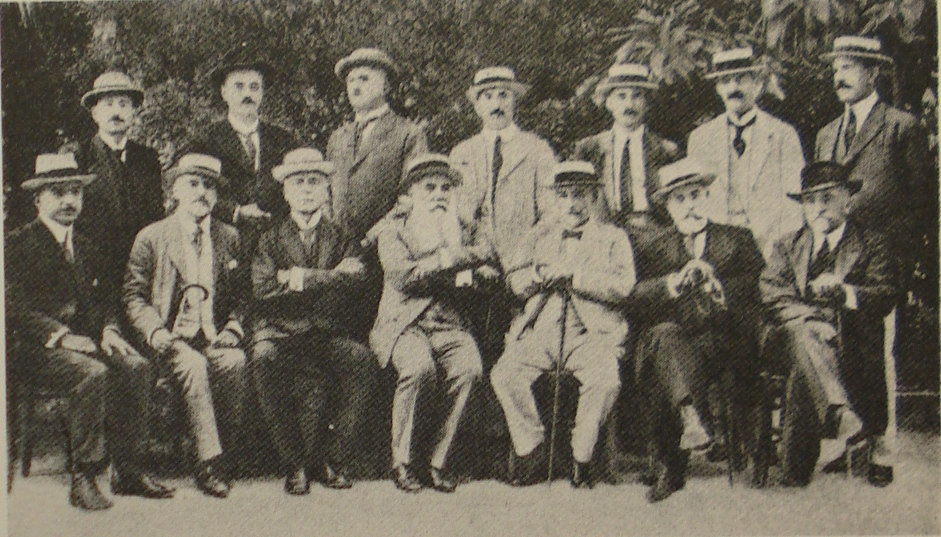
Participants of the June–July 1917 talks that resulted in the adoption of the Corfu Declaration

The Serbian position was weakened following the loss of Russian support after the February Revolution and President of the United States Woodrow Wilson's refusal to honour secret agreements that had promised territorial rewards. At the same time, the Entente Powers were still looking for ways to achieve a separate peace with Austria-Hungary and isolate the German Empire in the war. South Slavic deputies on the Austro-Hungarian Imperial Council in Vienna presented the May Declaration, proposing the introduction of trialism in Austria-Hungary, allowing the South Slavs to unite in a single polity within the monarchy. France and the UK appeared to support the efforts of new Austro-Hungarian emperor Charles to restructure the empire and seek peace. This presented a problem for the Serbian government, which was exiled on the Greek island of Corfu since their military defeat, and increased the risk of a trialist solution for the Habsburg South Slavs if the separate peace treaty materialised, preventing the fulfilment of expansionist Serbian war objectives.

Pašić felt he had to come to an agreement with the Yugoslav Committee to strengthen the Serbian position with the Entente Powers while countering Italian interests in the Balkans. Trumbić and Pašić met on Corfu. At the conference, the Yugoslav Committee was represented by Trumbić, Hinković, Vošnjak, Vasiljević, Trinajstić, and Potočnjak. Trumbić received no information on the conference agenda, so the committee members were unprepared and had to individually negotiate with Pašić. Trumbić prioritised assurances Croatia would not be left within Austria-Hungary and that Italy would not occupy Dalmatia. He also opposed complete centralisation of the proposed union state. The meeting resulted in the Corfu Declaration, a manifesto in which the disparate groups declared a common objective; the unification of South Slavs in a constitutional, democratic, and parliamentary monarchy that would be headed by the Serbian ruling Karađorđević dynasty. Yugoslavia, the Yugoslav Committee's preferred name for the unified country, was rejected and the bulk of the constitutional matters were left to be decided later because Trumbić felt some agreement was necessary to curb threats of Italian expansion.

== Pašić–Trumbić conflict ==
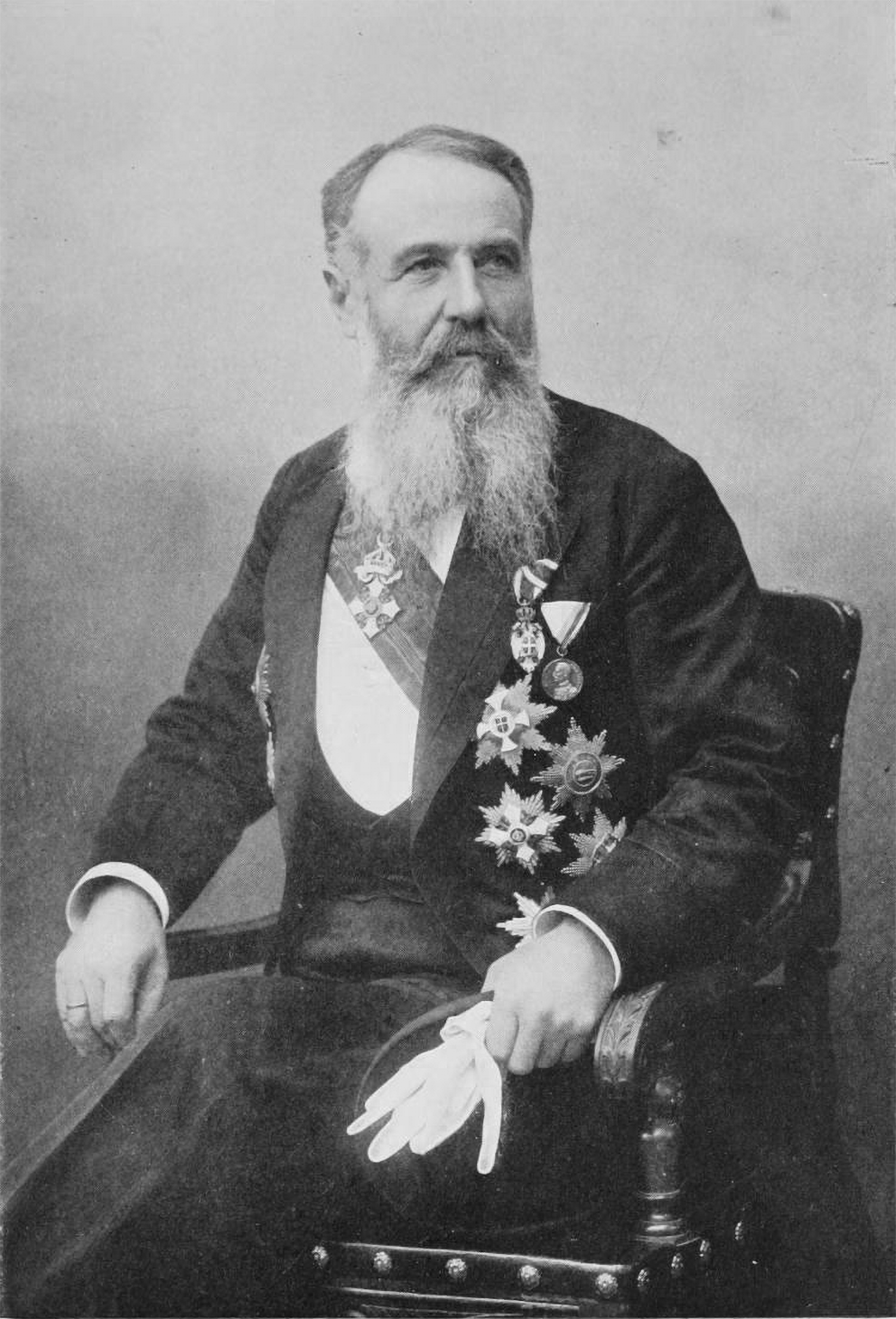
Nikola Pašić led the government of Serbia during World War I

Relations between Pašić and Trumbić deteriorated throughout 1918. They openly disagreed on several key demands made by Trumbić, including the recognition of the Serbs, Croats, and Slovenes living in Austria-Hungary as allied peoples; the recognition of the Yugoslav Committee as the representative of those peoples; and the recognition of the Serbs, Croats, and Slovenes Volunteer Corps (formerly called the First Serbian Volunteer Division) as an allied force drawn from Serbs, Croats, and Slovenes living in Austria-Hungary. After Pašić refused to support these positions, the Yugoslav Committee authorised Trumbić to bypass Pašić and directly present the Entente Powers with their demands. The Serbian government denied the Yugoslav Committee had any legitimacy, saying that Serbia alone represented all South Slavs, including those living in Austria-Hungary.

Pašić requested the Entente Powers issue a declaration recognising Serbia had the right to liberate and unify South Slavic territories with Serbia, but this was unsuccessful. Pašić stated that Yugoslavia would be absorbed by Serbia and not the other way around, that Serbia was primarily waging war to liberate Serbs, and that Pašić had created the Yugoslav Committee. He rejected Trumbić's claim that only one third of population of the future union lived in Serbia and that the Corfu Declaration called for two partners, stating the declaration was only for foreign consumption and was no longer valid. The French and British governments declined two Serbian requests for the authority to annex South Slavic Austro-Hungarian lands, and the British foreign secretary Arthur Balfour upheld the Corfu Declaration as an agreement of partners, demanding Pašić align his views with those of the Yugoslav Committee. However, in line with Serbia's wishes, the Entente Powers decided against recognition of the Yugoslav Committee as an allied body, informing the committee it would have to come to an agreement with Pašić.

The potential preservation of Austria-Hungary also caused friction between Trumbić and Pašić. The Entente Powers continued to pursue a separate peace with Austria-Hungary until early 1918, regardless of the Corfu Declaration. In January 1918, the Prime Minister of the United Kingdom David Lloyd George confirmed his support for the survival of Austria-Hungary. In his Fourteen Points speech, Wilson agreed, advocating for the autonomy of the peoples of Austria-Hungary. In October, Lloyd George discussed the potential preservation of a reformed Austria-Hungary with Pašić, saying Serbia could annex any areas occupied by the Royal Serbian Army before an armistice. In return, Trumbić asked Wilson to deploy US troops to Croatia-Slavonia to quell the disorder associated with the Green Cadres, suppress Bolshevism, and not to allow Italian or Serbian troops into the territory. He was unsuccessful.

== Geneva Declaration ==
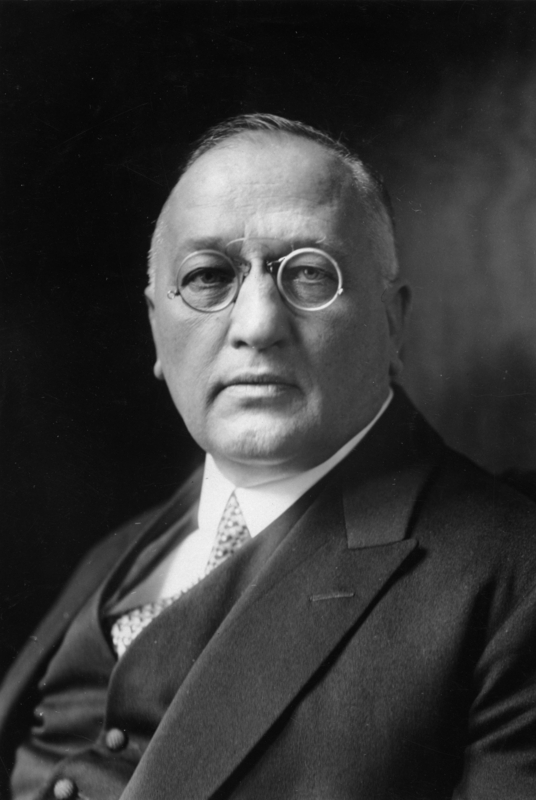
Anton Korošec represented the National Council of Slovenes, Croats and Serbs in the Geneva conference

In the process of the dissolution of Austria-Hungary, following the monarchy's military defeat in 1918, the State of Slovenes, Croats and Serbs was proclaimed in the South Slavic-inhabited lands of the former empire. The new state was governed by the Croat-Serb Coalition-dominated National Council, which authorised the Yugoslav Committee to speak on behalf of the Council in international relations. In late October 1918, the Croatian Sabor declared the end of ties with Austria-Hungary and elected the president of the National Council, Slovene politician Anton Korošec, to the new position of President of the State of Slovenes, Croats and Serbs.

Trumbić and Pašić met again in November in Geneva, where they were joined by Korošec and representatives of Serbian opposition parties, to discuss unification. At the conference, Pašić was isolated and ultimately compelled to recognise the National Council as an equal partner to the Serbian government. Trumbić obtained agreement from the other conference participants on the establishment of a common government, in which the National Council and the Government of Serbia would appoint an equal number of ministers to govern a common confederal state. Pašić consented after receiving a message from the President of France Raymond Poincaré stating he wished Pašić to come to an agreement with the representatives of the National Council. In return, the National Council and the Yugoslav Committee agreed to a speedy unification, and signed the Geneva Declaration.

A week later, prompted by Pašić, the Serbian government renounced the declaration, saying it limited Serbian sovereignty to its pre-war borders. The Vice President of the National Council, Croatian Serb politician Svetozar Pribićević, supported the repudiation of the Geneva Agreement and swayed the National Council against the position negotiated by Trumbić. Pribićević persuaded the Council members to proceed with unification and accept that the details of the new arrangements would be decided afterwards.

== Aftermath ==
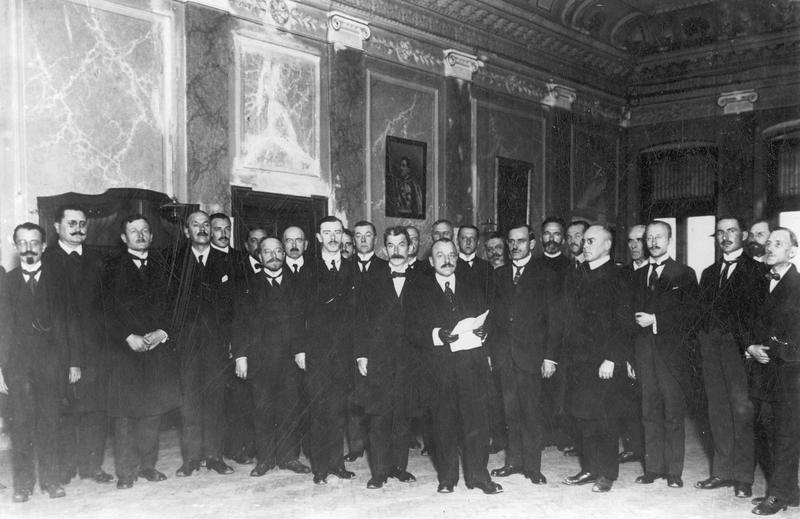
Delegation of the National Council of the State of Slovenes, Croats and Serbs received by Prince Regent Alexander on 1 December 1918

The National Council was confronted by civil unrest and, they believed, a coup d'état plot, and requested help from the Serbian Army to quell the violence. At the same time, the council hoped Serbian support would halt the Italian Army's advance from the west, where it had seized Rijeka and was approaching Ljubljana. Having no legal means to stop the Italian advance because the Entente Powers had authorised it, nor having sufficient armed forces to stop it, the National Council feared the Italian presence on the eastern shores of the Adriatic would become permanent. The National Council dispatched a delegation to Prince Regent Alexander to arrange an urgent unification with Serbia in a federation. The delegation ignored the instructions it had been given when it addressed the Prince Regent, omitting to secure specific terms for the unification agreement. The Prince Regent accepted the offer on behalf of Peter I of Serbia and the Kingdom of Serbs, Croats and Slovenes, which was subsequently renamed Yugoslavia, was established with no agreement on the nature of the new political union. Mate Drinković, a member of the delegation, informed Trumbić in a letter that unification had been proclaimed, saying any other agreement would have been impossible to obtain.

In early 1919, Trumbić appointed Trinajstić as his replacement at the head of the Yugoslav Committee. The newly appointed Prime Minister of the Kingdom of Serbs, Croats and Slovenes, Stojan Protić, instructed the Yugoslav Committee to dissolve. On 12 February, Trinajstić convened a meeting, with Trumbić attending; the majority of the committee members decided not to dissolve the body despite Protić's instructions. Nevertheless, the Yugoslav Committee ceased to exist in March 1919.

Czech historian Milada Paulová wrote a book examining the relationship between the Yugoslav Committee and the Serbian government, and its translation was published in 1925. According to Paulová, the committee had to fight for an equal position, while Pašić's actions were guided by Serbian nationalism. Paulová's work had an impact on Yugoslav historiography, especially Slovene and Croatian, and contributed to the interwar debate on the levels of Yugoslavism espoused by the Yugoslav Committee and the Pašić government. In Communist Yugoslavia, the work of the Yugoslav Committee was re-examined from late 1950s, and the results exhibited the first post-war disagreements between Croatian and Serbian historiographies. At the 1961 congress of the union of historians in Ljubljana, Franjo Tuđman argued the Serbian government had aspired to hegemony and criticised fellow historian Jovan Marjanović, who had claimed otherwise. In 1965, the Zagreb-based Yugoslav Academy of Sciences and Arts published a book emphasising the Yugoslav Committee's contribution to the creation of Yugoslavia.

== Sources ==
- Antoličič, Gregor (2020). "Avstro-ogrsko poveljstvo jugozahodne fronte in vprašanja politične drže na Hrvaškem med prvo svetovno vojno" [The Austro-Hungarian Command of the Southwestern Front and Questions concerning the Political Mood in Croatia during the First World War]. Pilar: časopis za društvene i humanističke studije (in Slovenian). 15 (29–30). Zagreb: Institut društvenih znanosti Ivo Pilar: 63–82. ISSN 1846-3010.
- Banac, Ivo (1984). The National Question in Yugoslavia: Origins, History, Politics. Ithaca: Cornell University Press. ISBN 0-8014-1675-2.
- Banac, Ivo (2019). "The Dissolution of Yugoslav Historiography". In Ramet, Sabrina P. (ed.). Beyond Yugoslavia: Politics, Economics, And Culture In A Shattered Community. Routledge. ISBN 978-0-42972-232-5.
- Boban, Branka (2019). "Stavovi hrvatske političke elite prema stvaranju jugoslavenske države" [Attitudes of Croatian political elite towards formation of the Yugoslav state]. Tragovi: časopis za srpske i hrvatske teme (in Croatian). 2 (2). Zagreb: Serb National Council: 8–98. doi:10.52328/t. ISSN 2623-8926.
- Cipek, Tihomir (2003). "The Croats and Yugoslavism". In Djokić, Dejan (ed.). Yugoslavism: Histories of a Failed Idea, 1918-1992. London: C. Hurst & Co. pp. 71–83. ISBN 1-85065-663-0.
- Evans, James (2008). Great Britain and the Creation of Yugoslavia, Negotiating Balkan Nationality and Identity. London: I.B. Tauris. ISBN 9780857713070.
- Glenny, Misha (2012). The Balkans, 1804–2012: Nationalism, War and the Great Powers. Toronto: House of Anansi Press. ISBN 978-1-77089-273-6.
- Hameršak, Filip (2005). "Josip Jedlowski – životopis (s bilješkama za transnacionalnu povijest jedne građanske obitelji)" [Josip Jedlowski: A Biography (Including Notes on a Transnational History of a Middle-Class Family)]. Časopis za suvremenu povijest (in Croatian). 37 (1). Zagreb: Croatian Institute of History: 101–128. ISSN 0590-9597.
- Headlam, James Wycliffe (1911). "Austria-Hungary" . In Chisholm, Hugh (ed.). Encyclopædia Britannica. Vol. 3 (11th ed.). Cambridge University Press.
- Janković, Dragoslav (1964). "Ženevska konferencija o stvaranju jugoslovenske zajednice 1918. godine" [Geneva Conference on Creation of the Yugoslav Community in 1918]. Istorija XX veka [History of the 20th Century] (in Serbian). Vol. V. Belgrade: Institute of Legal History of the University of Belgrade Faculty of Law. pp. 225–262. OCLC 67000822.
- Jelavich, Charles; Jelavich, Barbara (2000). The Establishment of the Balkan National States, 1804–1920. Seattle: University of Washington Press. ISBN 0-295-96413-8.
- Krizman, Bogdan (1970). "Vanjskopolitički položaj Kraljevine Srba, Hrvata i Slovenaca godine 1919" [The Position of the Monarchy of Serbs, Croats and Slovenes in the World in 1919]. Časopis za suvremenu povijest (in Croatian). 2 (1). Zagreb: Croatian Institute of History: 23–59. ISSN 0590-9597.
- Lampe, John R. (2000). Yugoslavia as History: Twice There Was a Country (2nd ed.). Cambridge: Cambridge University Press. ISBN 0-521-77357-1.
- Leček, Suzana (1998). "Gazzari, Julije". Croatian Biographical Lexicon (in Croatian). Miroslav Krleža Institute of Lexicography.
- Machiedo Mladinić, Norka (2007). "Prilog proučavanju djelovanja Ivana Meštrovića u Jugoslavenskom odboru" [A Contribution to the Study of Ivan Meštrović's Activities on the Yugoslav Committee]. Časopis za suvremenu povijest (in Croatian). 39 (1). Zagreb: Croatian Institute of History: 133–156. ISSN 0590-9597.
- Mastilović, Draga (2012). "Др Никола Стојановић између српства и југословенства" [Dr Nikola Stojanović between Serbia and Yugoslavia]. Зборник За Историју Босне И Херцеговине (in Serbian) (7). Belgrade: Serbian Academy of Sciences and Arts: 267–299. ISSN 0354-9461.
- Matijević, Zlatko (2008). "The National Council of Slovenes, Croats and Serbs in Zagreb (1918/1919)". Review of Croatian History. 4 (1). Zagreb: Hrvatski institut za povijest: 51–84. ISSN 1845-4380.
- Pavlović, Srđa (2008). Balkan Anschluss: The Annexation of Montenegro and the Creation of the Common South Slavic State. West Lafayette: Purdue University Press. ISBN 9781557534651.
- Pavlović, Vojislav G (2019). "Italy and the Creation of Yugoslavia. Delenda Austria?". In Pavlović, Vojislav G. (ed.). Serbia and Italy in the Great War. Belgrade: Institute for Balkan Studies. pp. 245–278. ISBN 9788671791038.
- Pavlowitch, Kosta St. (2003a). "The First World War and Unification of Yugoslavia". In Djokić, Dejan (ed.). Yugoslavism: Histories of a Failed Idea, 1918-1992. London: C. Hurst & Co. pp. 27–41. ISBN 1-85065-663-0.
- Pavlowitch, Stevan K. (2003b). "Serbia, Montenegro and Yugoslavia". In Djokić, Dejan (ed.). Yugoslavism: Histories of a Failed Idea, 1918-1992. London: C. Hurst & Co. pp. 57–70. ISBN 1-85065-663-0.
- Ramet, Sabrina P. (2006). The Three Yugoslavias: State-building and Legitimation, 1918–2005. Bloomington: Indiana University Press. ISBN 9780253346568.
- Robbins, Keith (1971). "British Diplomacy and Bulgaria 1914–1915". The Slavonic and East European Review. 49 (117). London: Modern Humanities Research Association: 560–585. ISSN 0037-6795. JSTOR 4206453.
- Rusinow, Dennison (2003). "The Yugoslav Idea before Yugoslavia". In Djokić, Dejan (ed.). Yugoslavism: Histories of a Failed Idea, 1918-1992. London: C. Hurst & Co. pp. 11–26. ISBN 1-85065-663-0.
- Sovilj, Milan P. (2018). "About Yugoslavia on the Eve of Its Establishment: Nikola Pašić and British Prime Minister David Lloyd George About the Future Yugoslav State on 15th October 1918". Sociološki pregled Социолошки преглед. 52 (4). Belgrade: Serbian Sociological Society: 1335–1351. doi:10.5937/socpreg52-18428. ISSN 0085-6320.
- Sretenović, Stanislav (2021). "The Invention of Yugoslav Identity: Serbian and South Slav Historiographies on World War I, 1918–2018". In Cornelissen, Christoph; Weinrich, Arndt (eds.). Writing the Great War, The Historiography of World War I from 1918 to the Present. New York City: Berghahn Books. pp. 263–301. doi:10.2307/j.ctv1tbhq0p.12. ISBN 9781800737273. JSTOR j.ctv1tbhq0p.12. S2CID 238095829.
- Stančić, Nikša (2014). "Hrvatska politika i nastanak Jugoslavije: od Berlinskog kongresa 1878. do kraja Prvoga svjetskog rata 1918" [Croatian Politics and the Birth of Yugoslavia from the Congress of Berlin (1878) until the First World War (1918)]. Adrias: Zbornik radova Zavoda za znanstveni i umjetnički rad Hrvatske akademije znanosti i umjetnosti u Splitu (in Croatian) (20). Split: Croatian Academy of Sciences and Arts, Institute for Scientific and Artistic Work in Split: 93–103. ISSN 0352-9924.
- Wachtel, Andrew (1998). Making a Nation, Breaking a Nation: Literature and Cultural Politics in Yugoslavia. Redwood City: Stanford University Press. ISBN 978-0-8047-3181-2.
