= Julije Gazzari =

Croatian politician and lawyer (1865 – 1934)

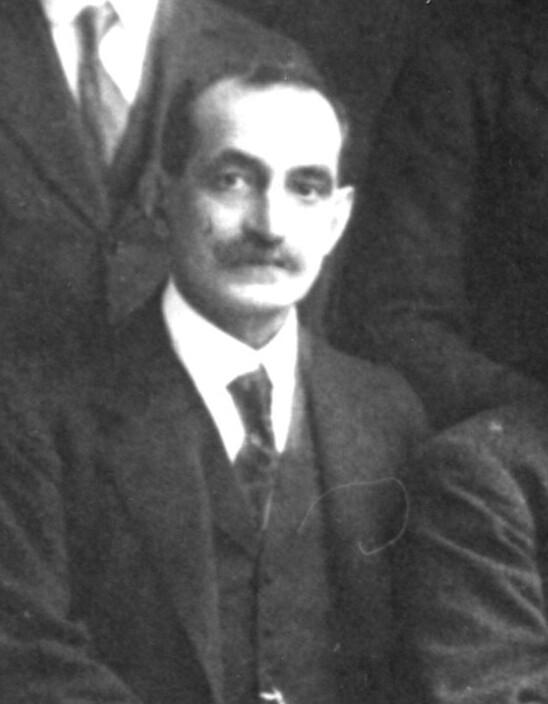
- Julije Gazzari in 1916
- Born: 21 December 1865; Sutivan, Kingdom of Dalmatia, Austrian Empire (now Croatia)
- Died: 15 September 1934 (aged 68); Zagreb, Yugoslavia (now Croatia)
- Education: University of Graz
- Occupations: Politician, lawyer

Julije Gazzari (Sutivan, 21 December 1865 – Zagreb, 15 September 1934) was a lawyer and Croatian and Yugoslavian politician. Gazzari graduated law from the University of Graz in 1887 where he met Ante Trumbić. Gazzari opened his law firm in Knin, and moved to Šibenik in 1904. In 1914, after the outbreak of the World War I, he left Austria-Hungary and joined Trumbić and Frano Supilo and others as a founding member of the London-headquartered Yugoslav Committee, and ad-hoc group of politicians and activists advocating unification of the South Slavs under Yugoslavist principles. Gazzari's brother Remigio, a Croatian Chilean industrialist, contributed financially to the committee. In 1917, Gazzari took over management of the Geneva office of the Yugoslav Committee, and moved to Rome in April 1918 to lead the committee's Italian office jointly with Dinko Trinajstić. He was one of authors of the Geneva Declaration, a failed attempt to reach an agreement with the government of the Kingdom of Serbia on establishment of a South Slavic federal state. In 1919–1920, Gazzari was included in a team of experts of the newly established Kingdom of Serbs, Croats and Slovenes at the Paris Peace Conference, tasked with negotiations regarding international borders. Gazzari was disappointed by policies pursued by the Kingdom of Serbs, Croats and Slovenes, left politics, and returned to Šibenik. There he continued to practise law until 1931.
