= Jovan Banjanin =

Croatian Serb politician (1874–1960)

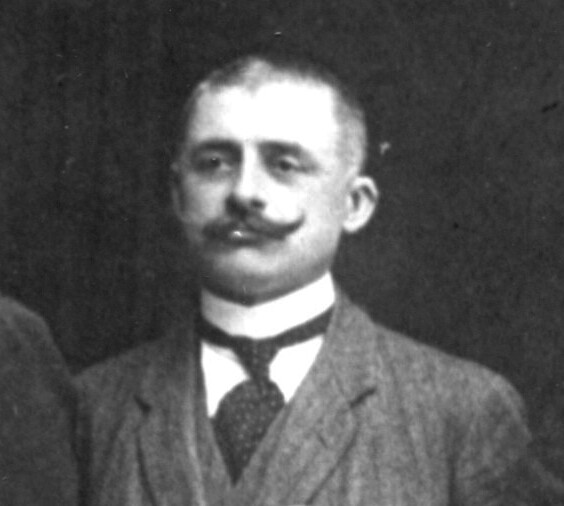
- Jovan Banjanin in 1916
- Born: 1874; Gospić, Croatia-Slavonia, Austria-Hungary
- Died: 1960 (aged 85–86); London, United Kingdom
- Education: University of Zagreb; Charles University
- Occupation: Politician
- Political party: Serb Independent Party; Croat-Serb Coalition; Democratic Party; Yugoslav National Party

Jovan Banjanin (1874–1960) was a Croatian Serb and Yugoslavian politician.

== Biography ==
Banjanin was born in 1874 in Gospić, Austria-Hungary (now Croatia). He pursued Slavic studies at the University of Zagreb and the Charles University in Prague until 1898. In 1896, Banjanin was an active member of the United Croat and Serb Academic Youth (Ujedinjena hrvatska i srpska akademska omladina) along with Ivan Lorković, Lav Mazzura, and Svetozar Pribićević before moving to the Serb Independent Party in 1900 together with Pribičević. The two took leading positions in the party by 1903. Banjanin was a proponent of the 1903 Rijeka Resolution and supporter of joining the Croat-Serb Coalition. Banjanin was elected a member of the Croatian Sabor in the 1906 Croatian parliamentary election in the district of Udbina, and he retained his seat until 1910. In 1907–1910, he was also appointed a delegate of the Kingdom of Croatia-Slavonia to the Diet of Hungary. Following the outbreak of the World War I, he was conscripted into the Austro-Hungarian Army, but he deserted the army to Serbia. During the war, he stayed in France and Switzerland and joined the Yugoslav Committee—an ad-hoc group of politicians and activists advocating unification of the South Slavs living in Austria-Hungary as well as in Serbia.

After the war, Banjanin joined the Democratic Party, but he left it by the end of 1919 due to disagreements with the party leadership on unconstitutional government in the newly established Kingdom of Serbs, Croats and Slovenes. He was a politically independent member of the Temporary National Representation, the provisional legislative body of the Kingdom of Serbs, Croats and Slovenes tasked with adopting the national constitution. In 1920, he worked with lawyer Ivo Politeo in Zagreb and Karlovac to establish a non-partisan political movement. Later that year, Banjanin won a seat in the 1920 Kingdom of Serbs, Croats and Slovenes Constitutional Assembly election as an independent candidate in Zagreb. He rejoined the Democratic Party in 1924 following a split between Ljubomir Davidović and Pribičević and Pribičević's departure from the party. He was defeated in the 1925 Kingdom of Serbs, Croats and Slovenes parliamentary election, but Banjanin won a seat in the Zagreb Assembly in the 1927 Zagreb local elections. In 1930s, Banjanin became a member of the Yugoslav National Party. He became a member of the government of General Dušan Simović in March 1941 following the Yugoslav coup d'état, and left the country in April after the Axis powers invaded Yugoslavia. He served as a minister in the Yugoslav government-in-exile. After World War II and establishment of communist rule in Yugoslavia, Banjanin remained in the United Kingdom. He died in London in 1960.
