= Niš Declaration =

Statement of Serbian objectives in the World War I

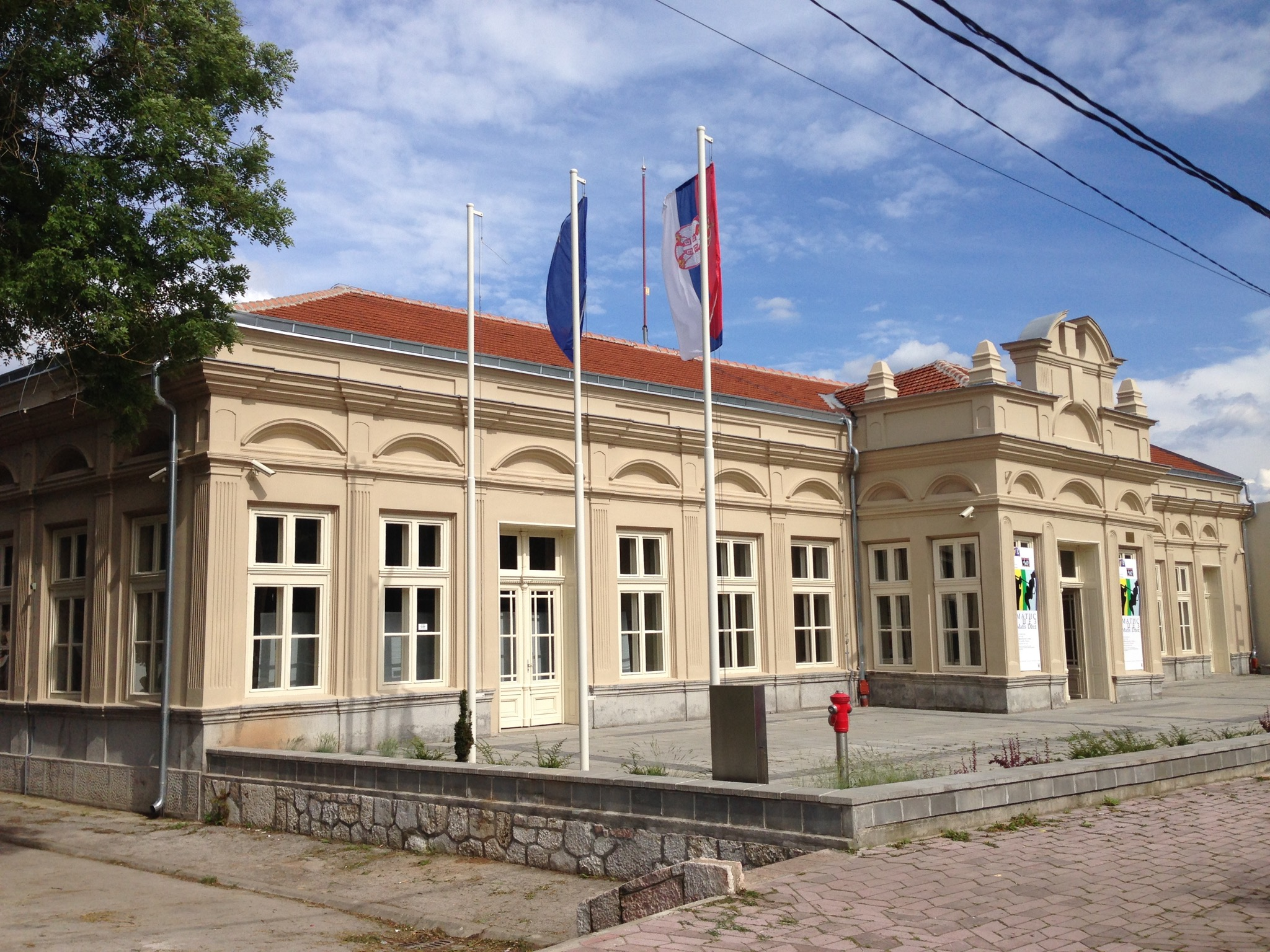
- The former Officers' Club in Niš, where the declaration was adopted
- Presented: 7 December 1914
- Location: Niš, Serbia

The Niš Declaration (Serbian: Niška deklaracija, Serbian Cyrillic: Нишка декларација) was a document issued on 7 December 1914, in the midst of World War I, in which the government of the Kingdom of Serbia formally declared its wartime objectives. Published during the Battle of Kolubara as a defensive declaration seeking to attract support from the South Slavs living in Austria-Hungary, it contained a promise to work for the liberation of South Slavs from foreign rule and the establishment of a common South Slavic state after the war. As the Serbian government had withdrawn from Belgrade earlier in the conflict, the declaration was adopted in the temporary Serbian capital of Niš.

The Triple Entente did not accept the objectives set out in the Niš Declaration because they supported the preservation of Austria-Hungary. In subsequent years, Allied support for a separate peace with Austria-Hungary and trialist reform proposals such as the May Declaration of 1917 motivated the Serbian government to cooperate with the Yugoslav Committee. Negotiations between the Serbian government and the Yugoslav Committee led to the Corfu Declaration of 1917, in which the two sides agreed to the creation of a common South Slavic state once the war had ended.

== Background ==
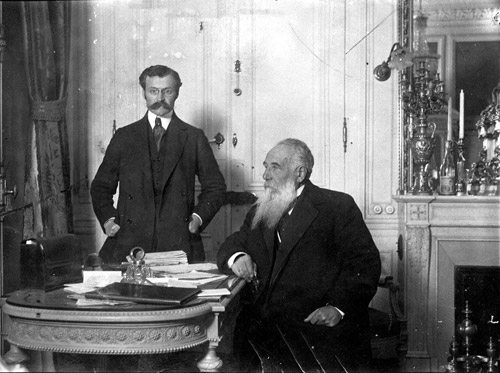
Nikola Pašić (seated) was the Prime Minister of Serbia during World War I

At the beginning of World War I, the Royal Serbian Army successfully repulsed the Austro-Hungarian Army in the initial stages of the Serbian campaign. By early November 1914, the Royal Serbian Army was forced to abandon the Serbian capital, Belgrade, and territory in the northeast of the country. The government of Serbia retreated south to the city of Niš, which became the country's temporary capital. In mid-November, the Austro-Hungarians reached the Kolubara River but were prevented from advancing further in the month-long Battle of Kolubara, after which the initiative passed from the Austro-Hungarians to the Serbians, who launched a counter-offensive on 3 December.

Following the outbreak of hostilities, Serbia's leadership considered the war an opportunity for territorial expansion beyond the Serb-inhabited areas of the Balkans. A committee tasked with determining the country's war aims produced a programme to establish a Yugoslav state through the addition of Croatia-Slavonia, the Slovene Lands, Vojvodina, Bosnia and Herzegovina, and Dalmatia. This echoed Serbian Foreign Minister Ilija Garašanin's 1844 Načertanije – a treatise anticipating the collapse of the Ottoman Empire which called for the unification of all Serbs in a single state to pre-empt Russian or Austrian imperial expansion into the Balkans.

== Provisions ==
The Serbian government declared, and the National Assembly confirmed, its war aims in Niš on 7 December. In the Niš Declaration, the National Assembly of Serbia announced the struggle to liberate and unify "unliberated brothers". However, the declaration did not mention Greater Serbia. Instead, the declaration spoke of "three tribes of one people" when referring to the Serbs, the Croats, and the Slovenes. Historian Andrej Mitrović described the declaration as the "Yugoslav" declaration of the Serbian government because the government claimed to work in the service of the Serbian state and the "Serbo-Croatian and Slovenian tribe" in the declaration.

The concept of the "three tribes of one people" was introduced by a group of Belgrade-based scholars led by Jovan Cvijić in December 1914. Cvijić and his colleagues, as well as the government taking their cue from Cvijić, deemed the Macedonians and Bosniaks ethnically "unformed elements" which could be quickly assimilated by the Serbs. The Montenegrins were not mentioned in the declaration, as Serbia assumed the central role in state-building of the future South Slavic polity with support from the major Entente powers. Cvijić's views were incorporated into the Niš Declaration as hopes of a short war became unrealistic, and the declaration was meant as a way to attract support from South Slavs living in Austria-Hungary. The government was motivated to appeal to the fellow South Slavs as it feared little material support was coming from the Triple Entente allies.

== Aftermath ==
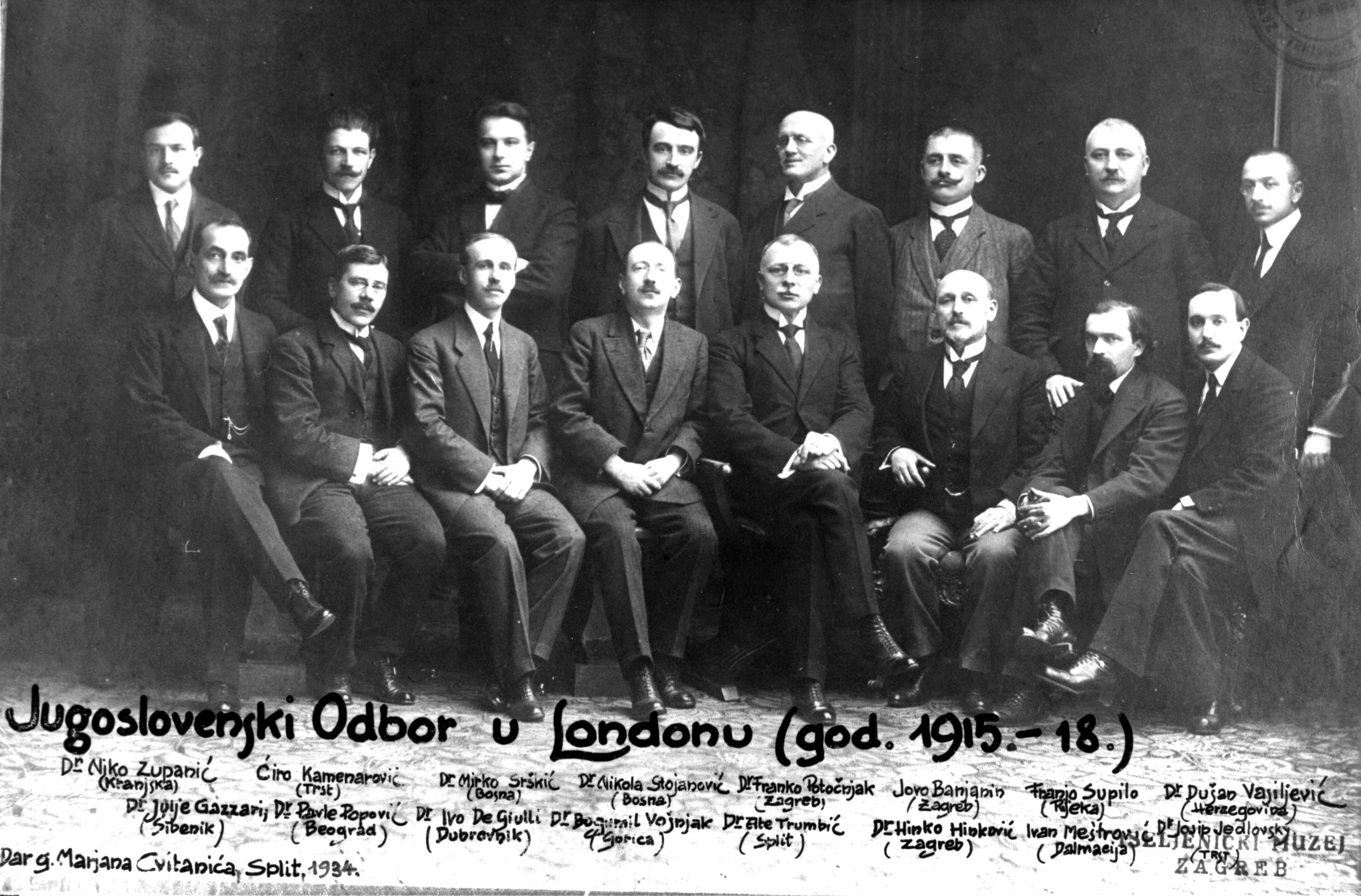
The Yugoslav Committee was an interest group largely composed of Dalmatian Croats striving for the unification of the South Slavs

Serbian Prime Minister Nikola Pašić wanted to abandon the Niš Declaration in 1916 and reduce the wartime objectives to liberation of Serbian territory and gaining control over areas inhabited by ethnic Serbs, but he was overruled by the Prince Regent Alexander. The Entente never accepted the Niš Declaration. International support for Austria-Hungary's preservation would not begin to wane until the United States entered the war in 1917. Nonetheless, in his Fourteen Points speech, U.S. President Woodrow Wilson only promised autonomy for the peoples of Austria-Hungary. Preservation of the dual monarchy was not abandoned before the signing of the Treaty of Brest-Litovsk in March 1918 when the allies became convinced that it could not resist a Communist revolution.

On 30 May 1917, South Slavic members of Vienna's Imperial Council presented the body with the May Declaration, a manifesto demanding the unification of Habsburg lands inhabited by Croats, Slovenes, and Serbs into a democratic, free and independent state equal in status to Cisleithania or the Kingdom of Hungary, under the Habsburg dynasty. The May Declaration was issued while the Entente was still looking for ways to achieve a separate peace with Austria-Hungary and thereby detach it from the influence of the German Empire. This presented a problem for the Serbian government, then exiled on the Greek island of Corfu following the Great Retreat in the winter of 1915–1916. If a separate peace treaty materialised, it increased the risk of a trialist solution for the Habsburg South Slavs, preventing the fulfillment of Serbia's war objectives. Lacking previously strong Russian diplomatic backing since the February Revolution, Pašić felt compelled to come to an arrangement with the Yugoslav Committee, an ad-hoc group of intellectuals and politicians from Austria-Hungary claiming to represent the interests of South Slavs, whose most prominent member, Frano Supilo, advocated a federation to counter the threat of Serbian hegemony in a common South Slavic state.

Pašić invited the Yugoslav Committee to talks on the principles of post-war unification which produced the Corfu Declaration in July 1917. The new declaration retained the "one tri-named people" phrase first used in the Niš Declaration.

== Sources ==
- Banac, Ivo (1984). The National Question in Yugoslavia: Origins, History, Politics. Ithaca: Cornell University Press. ISBN 0-8014-1675-2.
- Djokić, Dejan (2019). "Vek Jugoslavije: Kako i zašto su Srbi, Hrvati i Slovenci stvorili zajedničku državu" [The Century of Yugoslavia: How and Why the Serbs, Croats and Slovenians Established a Common State]. Tragovi: časopis za srpske i hrvatske teme (in Serbian). 2 (1). Zagreb: Srpsko narodno vijeće, Arhiv Srba u Hrvatskoj: 25–51. ISSN 2623-8926.
- Lampe, John R. (2000). Yugoslavia as History: Twice There Was a Country (2nd ed.). Cambridge: Cambridge University Press. ISBN 0-521-77357-1.
- Mitrović, Andrej (2003). "The Yugoslav Question, the First World War and the Peace Conference, 1914–1920". In Djokic, Dejan (ed.). Yugoslavism: Histories of a Failed Idea, 1918–1992. London: C. Hurst & Co. pp. 42–56. ISBN 1-85065-663-0.
- Pavlović, Srđa (2008). Balkan Anschluss: The Annexation of Montenegro and the Creation of the Common South Slavic State. West Lafayette: Purdue University Press. ISBN 9781557534651.
- Pavlowitch, Kosta St. (2003). "The First World War and Unification of Yugoslavia". In Djokic, Dejan (ed.). Yugoslavism: Histories of a Failed Idea, 1918–1992. London: C. Hurst & Co. pp. 27–41. ISBN 1-85065-663-0.
- Ramet, Sabrina P. (2006). The Three Yugoslavias: State-building and Legitimation, 1918–2005. Bloomington: Indiana University Press. ISBN 9780253346568.
