= Dejan Djokić (historian) =

Serbian historian

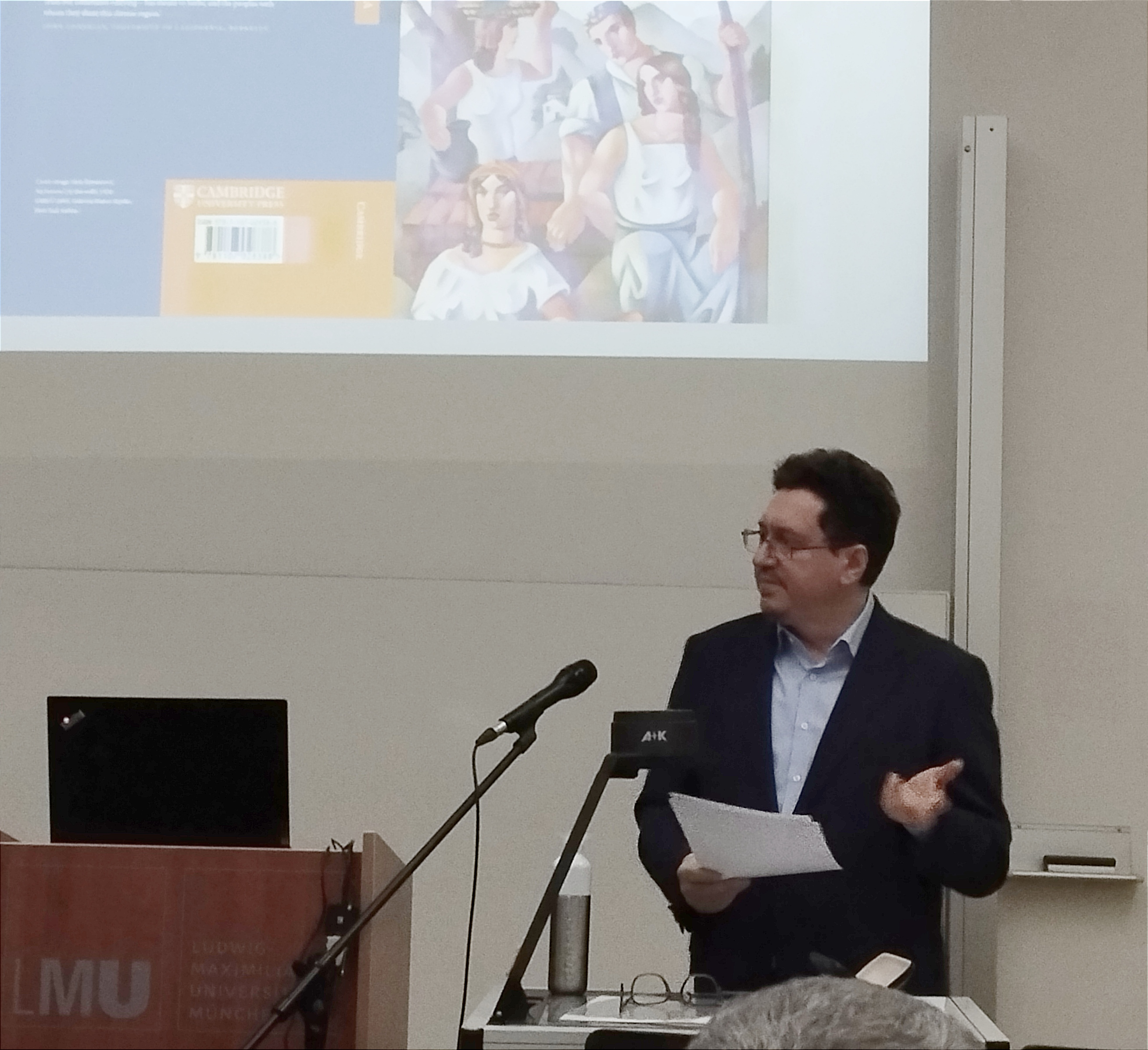
- Djokic in 2023 at LMU Munich
- Occupations: historian and author

Academic background
- Education: University of London (B.A.); University College London (Ph.D.)

Academic work
- Institutions: National University of Ireland; University of London; Humboldt University of Berlin

Dejan Djokić is a Professor of History at the National University of Ireland, Maynooth and Fellow at the Chair of Southeast European History at Humboldt University of Berlin. Djokić specialises in the modern history of the Balkans, in particular the political, social and cultural history of former Yugoslavia and the rise and development of national ideologies in nineteenth-century Europe and Cold War history.

Djokić received his Ph.D. from UCL School of Slavonic and East European Studies and completed his postdoctoral specialisation at the Harriman Institute of New York's Columbia University, before becoming Professor of Modern and Contemporary History at Goldsmiths, University of London and Guest Professor in South-East European History at Humboldt University.

He is the founding Director of the Centre for the Study of the Balkans at Goldsmiths, co-founder of Rethinking Modern Europe at the Institute of Historical Research, University of London and a Fellow of the Royal Historical Society.

== Career ==
Djokić graduated in history from SSEES, University of London in 1996 and received his doctorate from University College London in 2004. He was then Lecturer at the University of Nottingham and a Postdoctoral Fellow at Columbia University, New York, for the Spring semester 2004. Djokić was then Professor of Modern and Contemporary History and Director of the Center for Balkan Studies at Goldsmiths College, University of London.

Djokić is a research associate at the Royal Historical Society, and was a research associate at the Woodrow Wilson Center in Washington and the Harriman Institute in New York as part of his postdoctoral specialisation. In 2019, he was one of 30 winners of the prestigious 'Mid-Career Fellowship' awarded by the British Academy. His research interests lie in the field of modern history of the Balkans, in particular the political, social and cultural history of the former Yugoslavia. Djokić's latest book A Concise History of Serbia was published in January 2023 by Cambridge University Press.

== Select bibliography ==
- Yugoslavism: Histories of a Failed Idea, 1918-1992. Hurst. 2003. ISBN 9781850656630.
- Elusive Compromise: A History of Interwar Yugoslavia. Columbia University Press. 2007. ISBN 9780231700191.
- Pasic & Trumbic: The Kingdom of Serbs, Croats and Slovenes. Haus Publishing. 2010. ISBN 9781905791781.
- A Concise History of Serbia. Cambridge University Press. 2023. ISBN 9781107028388.
