= 1920 Kingdom of Serbs, Croats and Slovenes Constitutional Assembly election =

- 28 November 1920
- All 419 seats in the Constituent Assembly; 210 seats needed for a majority
Party	Leader	Vote %	Seats
DS	Ljubomir Davidović	19.88	92
NRS	Nikola Pašić	17.71	91
HPSS	Stjepan Radić	14.35	50
KPJ	Filip Filipović	12.37	58
ZS–SKS	Mihailo Avramović	9.43	39
SLS–BŠS–HPS	Anton Korošec; Blaško Rajić; Stjepan Barić	6.92	27
JMO	Mehmed Spaho	6.90	24
JSDS		2.91	10
HTS	Nikola Buconjić; Nikola Precca	2.39	7
Džemijet	Nexhip Draga	1.87	8
HZ	Matko Laginja; Ivan Lorković	1.61	4
JRS	Ljubomir Stojanović	1.13	3
HSP	Vladimir Prebeg	0.68	2
Ante Trumbić	Ante Trumbić	0.41	1
NSS	Anton Pesek	0.38	2
Liberal		0.31	1
This lists parties that won seats. See the complete results below.
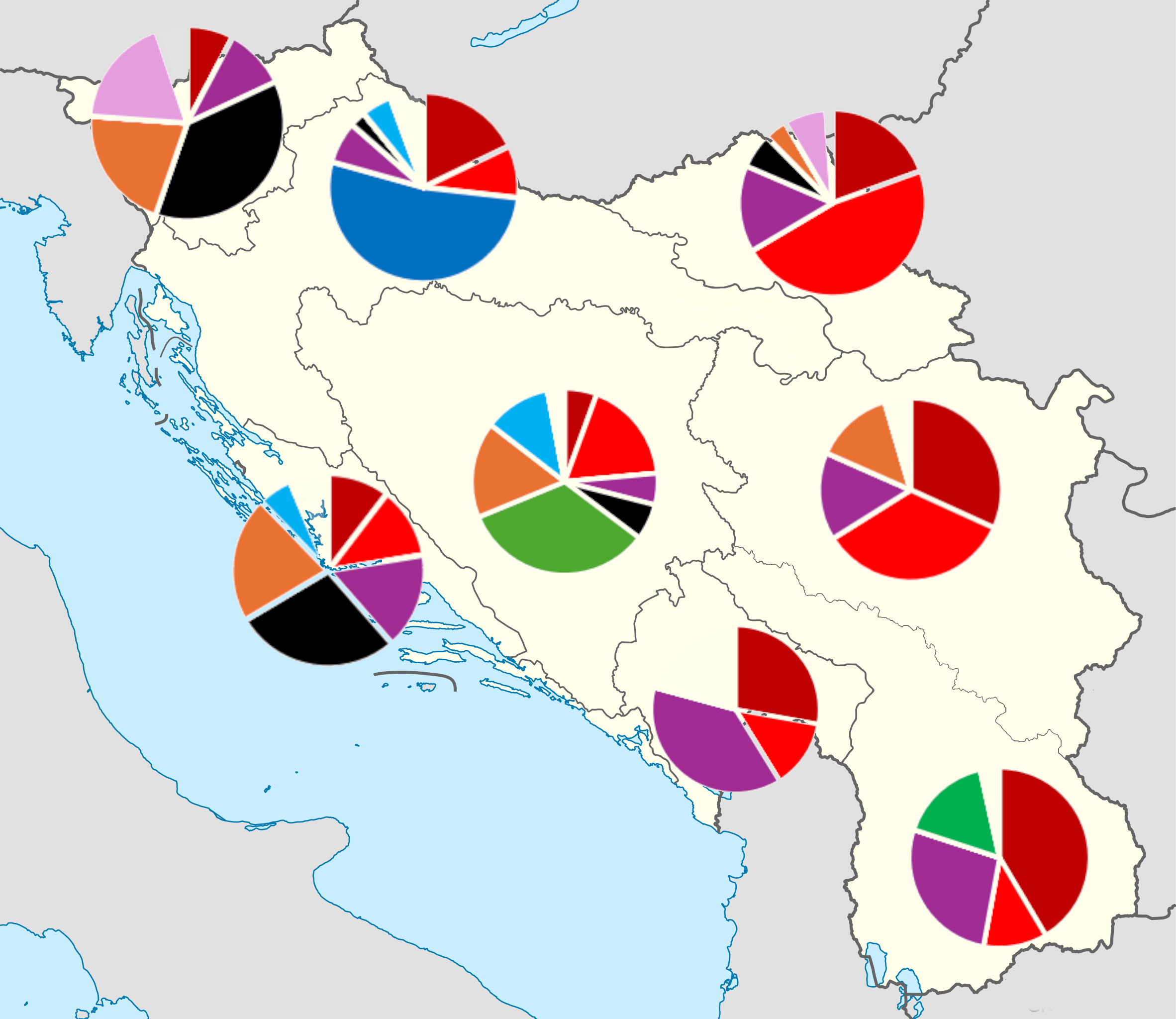
DS, NRS, HSS, KPJ, SLS‑HPS, JMO, Agrarian Party, HZ–HTS (Note: The Croatian Union and the Croatian Husbandmen's Party operated as independent parties in Croatia-Slavonia and in Bosnia and Herzegovina respectively, while in the National Club (Narodni klub) alliance before and after the elections.), Džemijet, SDP
Prime Minister before	Prime Minister after
Ljubomir Davidović; DS	Ljubomir Davidović; DS

Constitutional Assembly elections were held in the recently proclaimed Kingdom of Serbs, Croats and Slovenes (later renamed Yugoslavia) on 28 November 1920. The election was held in the context of political debate over the degree of centralisation or potential federalisation of Yugoslavia. The election was held in the entire territory of the country except the areas obtained shortly beforehand through the Treaty of Rapallo which regulated the borders with Italy because those areas were still under Italian occupation. The election legislation was enacted by the Temporary National Representation, a representative body appointed after creation of Yugoslavia. The legislation prescribed the universal manhood suffrage, except for Hungarian and German minorities, certain former Ottoman Empire nationals and Jews.

A total of 22 political parties or groups fielded candidates in 55 electoral districts which were determined based on pre-First World War censuses. Varying degrees of wartime losses and the suffrage regulations led to significant differences in the number of registered voters per parliamentary seat. There was a 65% voter turnout for the election. None of the parties won a majority of the 419 seats available. The Democratic Party (DS) and the People's Radical Party (NRS) emerged as the largest factions, winning 92 and 91 seats respectively. The third-most successful party at the election was the Communist Party of Yugoslavia (KPJ), winning 58 seats, followed by the Croatian Peasant Party (HSS) receiving 50 seats. The HSS was the only party to win an absolute majority in any province. Thus it became the leading Croatian political party.

The DS-NRS government failed to secure the needed majority in the assembly that would support the adoption of its draft constitution. The government therefore sought and obtained support from the Yugoslav Muslim Organization, the Džemijet, and a faction of the Agrarian Party in exchange for favourable terms of the pending land reform in interwar Yugoslavia. These alliances, aided by the government-determined rules of order of the Constitutional Assembly requiring a simple majority of all members of the assembly, led to the adoption of the Vidovdan Constitution as the first Yugoslav constitution. The DS and the NRS positions were brought closer together in the struggle against anti-centralist parties.

The rule requiring only the simple majority of votes was opposed by the parties whose objective was to prevent the centralisation of Yugoslavia. The HSS and other Croatian parties claimed that the Corfu Declaration agreed on by the Kingdom of Serbia and the Yugoslav Committee in 1917 required a qualified majority. They expected the constitution to be adopted by a two-thirds majority, and the Croats perceived the government-adopted rules as a betrayal. Subsequently, the HSS decided not to take part in the Constitutional Assembly and declared its position that the constitution would not be binding for Croats or Croatia. The KPJ attracted a significant protest vote, and a series of KPJ-led protests prompted the government to issue Obznana decree significantly curbing KPJ activities. In turn, the KPJ also left the parliament before the constitution was voted on. The Slovene People's Party left the assembly soon after.

== Background ==
The Kingdom of Serbs, Croats and Slovenes (later renamed Yugoslavia) was proclaimed by Prince Regent Alexander on 1 December 1918. The proclamation was made following a request by a delegation of the National Council of Slovenes, Croats and Serbs, representing the South Slavs living in territories once belonging to Austria-Hungary. The delegation received instructions requiring the establishment of a federation, but the delegation ignored the instructions. Following the proclamation, the Prince Regent appointed a government consisting of the Serb-dominated centralist parties, specifically the Democratic Party (DS) and the People's Radical Party (NRS). The Prince Regent appointed and confirmed subsequent governments. Before the 1920 election, the cabinet of Milenko Vesnić was appointed. It was replaced by the Nikola Pašić cabinet before the Constitutional Assembly was convened. The Temporary National Representation was established as an interim parliament, which primarily consisted of appointed members. The Temporary National Representation was meant to enact electoral law for the future Constitutional Assembly.

By the time of proclamation of Yugoslavia, the system of government in the state was largely undecided. Representatives of the Kingdom of Serbia and the Yugoslav Committee, an ad-hoc group claiming to represent the South Slavs living in Austria-Hungary, had agreed in the 1917 Corfu Declaration that Yugoslavia would be a monarchy with the House of Karađorđević as its head, with the question of the level of centralisation to be decided later on. In November 1918, representatives of the Yugoslav Committee, joined by the National Council of Slovenes, Croats and Serbs, negotiated with the representatives of Serbia on the question of centralisation. This council produced the Geneva Declaration, an agreement that Yugoslavia would be a confederation with a central government with limited powers. The Serbian government rejected this agreement because it wanted to establish a more centralised state serving Serbian political interests better.

Another issue was the Adriatic question, that is, the uncertainty regarding the borders of Yugoslavia. This arose from Italian claims based on the 1915 Treaty of London and the Fiume question, and was not addressed before the 1920 Treaty of Rapallo. The terms of the treaty were not fulfilled immediately. Instead, the Allied occupation of the eastern Adriatic, including the region of Dalmatia, remained in place until September 1921.

== Electoral system ==
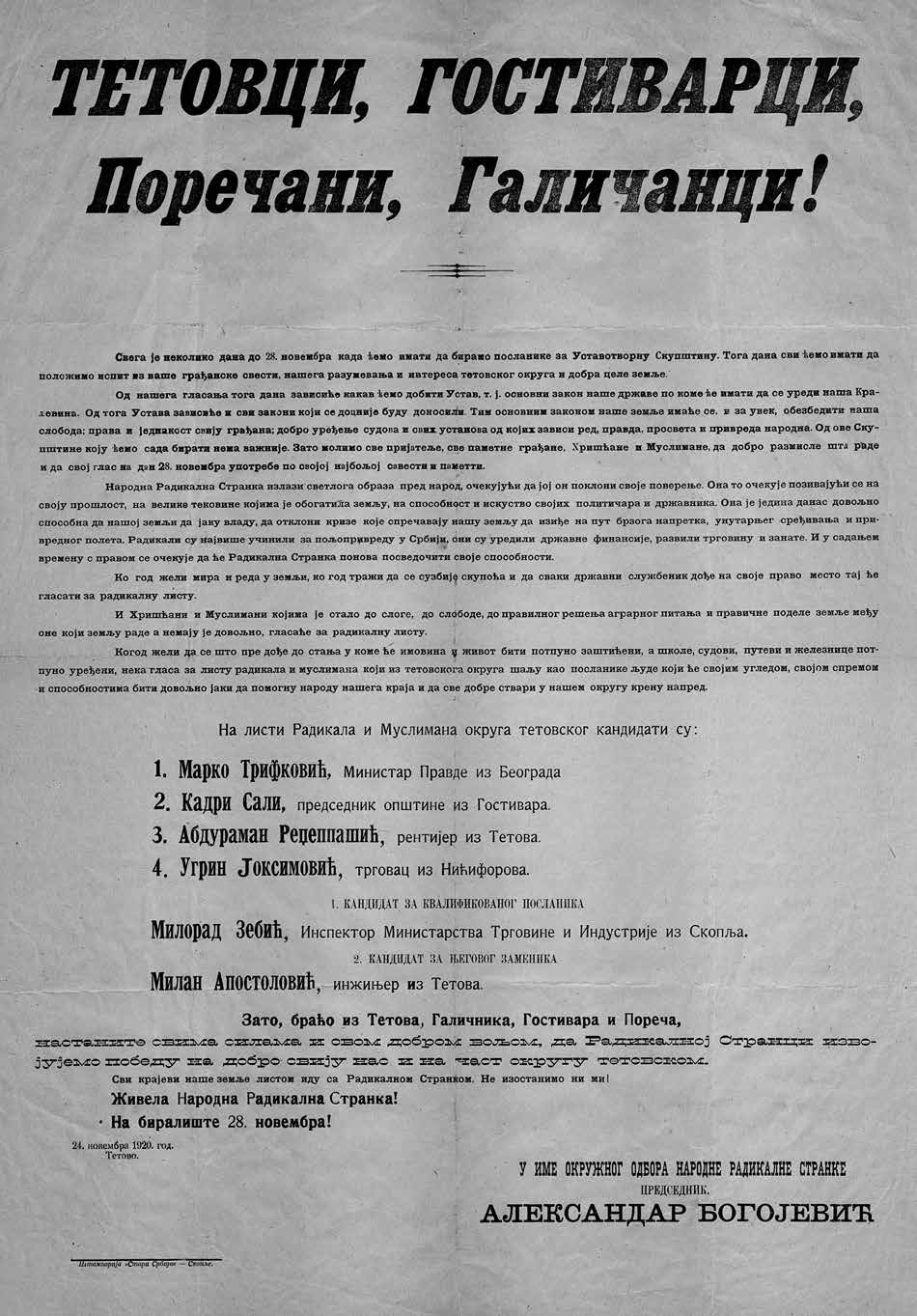
Election poster of the People's Radical Party in Tetovo district

The Temporary National Representation adopted the Election Act on 2 September 1920. The election law prescribed the universal suffrage for men over the age of 21 who were enrolled in the voter register. The law restricted the voting right to nationals of Serbia or Montenegro before 1 December 1918, citizens of Croatia-Slavonia or Dalmatia, and residents of Bosnia and Herzegovina and other territories included in Yugoslavia. The law also gave the right to vote to other Slavs residing in Yugoslavia, effectively numerous refugees from Russia, but also confirmed the right of Slavic and Albanian minorities to vote.

Ethnic Germans, Italians, and Hungarians living in Yugoslavia were not allowed to vote. The same applied to former Ottoman nationals, who had been residents in territories that became Yugoslav and left before November 1915. Furthermore, the right to vote was denied to the Jews unless they declared themselves Serbs or Croats or if the local authorities deemed them Serbs or Croats. Yugoslav authorities claimed that state security concerns justified the denial of voting rights. The denial of the right to vote was in breach of the obligations Yugoslavia assumed under the Treaty of Saint-Germain-en-Laye. The voting rights were also denied to convicted prisoners, people stripped of their civil rights, and certain religious minorities such as Jehovah's Witnesses. The legislation also determined the method of compilation of electoral registers, specifying that one had to reside in a particular place for six months to be admitted to the register.

Candidates had to be eligible to vote, literate, permanently residing in Yugoslavia for at least ten years, and over 25. A candidate was allowed to stand in election in up to three different districts simultaneously and, if successful in multiple districts, had to pick one and withdraw in others. Candidate lists were put forward for each electoral district, needing a hundred endorsements to be valid. Candidates having university-level or equivalent education to be "qualified candidates". The law required the ratio of qualified to ordinary candidates in each district to be at least 1:4, with at least one candidate in the list being qualified. (Note: The government erroneously calculated the qualified candidates' quota by dividing the number of candidates in a given district by four instead of five. The mistake was not spotted before the election.)

Voters cast secret ballots. Using rubber balls dropped into the appropriate boxes, voting was performed to indicate support for a specific candidate or candidate list. The method was adopted from Serbian pre-war electoral law, selected to accommodate many illiterate voters.

=== Electoral districts ===
There were 55 electoral districts nationwide, defined differently depending on the province. Southern Serbia (corresponding primarily to present-day Kosovo and Northern Macedonia) and Bosnia and Herzegovina were used as the electoral districts in Serbia. In Croatia-Slavonia, the county borders determined the electoral districts. (Note: Međimurje was added to Varaždin County, and Istria was added to Rijeka-Modruš County. The latter was ceded to Italy shortly before the election under the Treaty of Rapallo.) In Vojvodina (consisting of Bačka, Banat, and Baranja), Slovenia and Dalmatia judicial districts were the basis for the electoral districts. Montenegro was a single electoral district. Major cities, like Belgrade, Zagreb, and Ljubljana, were placed in special urban districts to avoid having numerous rural voters in districts containing urban centres. The large cities were awarded a disproportionately high number of seats in the parliament compared to other parts of the country, and the number of registered voters per candidate varied there as well: there were 2,737 registered voters per candidate in Belgrade, but 4,954 in Zagreb.

The number of candidates in each district was determined based on the 1910 census as one candidate per 30,000 residents. An additional candidate was assigned if there were 17,000 or more left without a candidate. The number of registered voters per candidate also varied between the provinces. This ranged from 3,301 in Vojvodina to 8,092 in Dalmatia. These discrepancies resulted from using the prewar census to establish the number of candidates. They were explained as compensation to Serbia for its wartime losses. (During the war, Serbia lost a third of its male population while Croatia's population rose significantly.)

Electoral districts by province
Province	Districts (seats)
Bosnia and Herzegovina	6: Banja Luka (13), Bihać (8), Mostar (9), Sarajevo (10), Travnik (9), Tuzla (14)
Croatia-Slavonia	9: Bjelovar-Križevci (11), Varaždin-Međimurje (13), Virovitica (9), Zagreb (17), Lika-Krbava (7), Modruš-Rijeka (8), Požega (9), Syrmia (14), City of Zagreb (5)
Dalmatia	1: entire province (11)
Montenegro	1: entire province (10)
Serbia	18: Belgrade (5), Valjevo (5), Vranje (9), Kragujevac (6), Krajina (4), Kruševac (6), Morava (7), Niš (7), Pirot (4), Podrinje (8), Požarevac (9), Rudnik (3), Smederevo (5), Timok (5), Toplica (4), Užice (5), Čačak (5), City of Belgrade (6)
Southern Serbia	12: Bitola (8), Bregalnica (3), Zvečan-Raška (5), Kosovo (6), Kumanovo (5), Metohija (3), Ohrid (3), Prizren (4), Prijepolje (4), Skopje (5), Tetovo (5), Tikveš (4)
Slovenia	3: Maribor-Celje (21), Ljubljana-Novo Mesto (15), City of Ljubljana (4)
Vojvodina	5: Velika Kikinda-Veliki Bečkerek (10), Pančevo-Bela Crkva (9), Subotica (8), Novi Sad (8), Sombor-Baranya (9)

Registered voters per assembly seat per province
Province	Seats	Registered voters per seat
Bosnia and Herzegovina	63	7,495
Croatia-Slavonia	93	6,849
Dalmatia	11	8,092
Montenegro	10	4,337
Serbia	103	5,662
Southern Serbia	55	5,600
Slovenia	40	5,381
Vojvodina	44	3,301

== Campaign ==
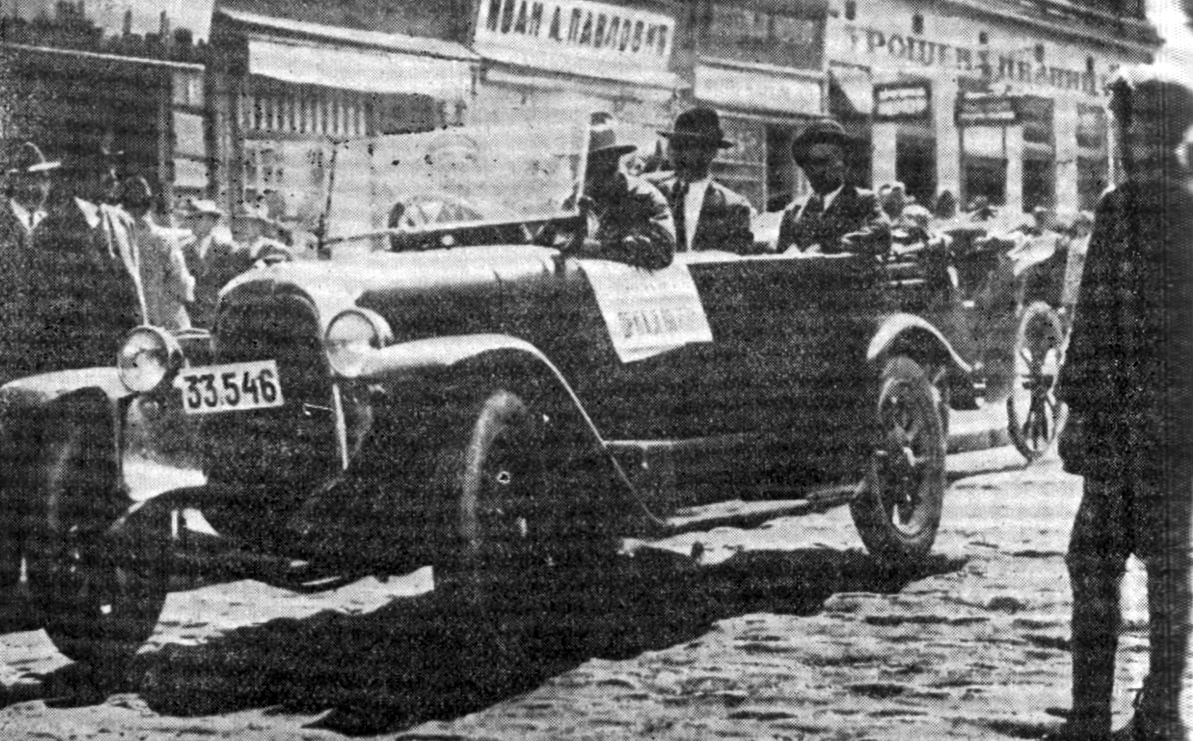
Election campaign of the Communist Party

Yugoslav authorities formally declared the freedom to campaign before the elections. This meant that restrictions on holding political rallies, previously in force in Slovenia and Croatia-Slavonia, were abolished. In addition, the provincial government of Bosnia and Herzegovina issued an order prohibiting administrative bodies from interfering with the election. However, police authorities received confidential instructions from the central government to disperse election rallies where dissent or protest against the government might be voiced. Because of this, the HSS was not allowed to hold public gatherings to promote its programme until just before the election day. HSS leader Stjepan Radić, who called for establishment of Yugoslavia as a federal republic, was imprisoned for his political activities during the entire election period and amnestied on the day of the election. The HSS benefited politically from its identification with the peasants' concerns in a predominantly rural country, including identification with the 1920 Croatian Peasant Rebellion that took place in September.

It was not uncommon for government officials to campaign on behalf of the DS. Abuses of office included issuing orders to the heads of municipalities and villages to rally people to DS events. In the run-up to the election, most cases of public display of discontent were organised by the Communist Party of Yugoslavia (KPJ). The party hoped to attract those who might otherwise cast protest votes.

== Results ==
None of the parties received a majority of the votes in the election. The DS and the NRS performed the best, receiving nearly 20% and 18% of the vote, respectively. The NRS achieved the best result in Serbia, closely followed by the DS, which also performed well in Southern Serbia and Montenegro. The HSS received the third-highest votes: just over 14% nationwide and more than 52% in Croatia-Slavonia, the only province in which the party ran. The HSS was the only party that won a majority of votes in any Yugoslav province.

In the fourth position was the KPJ at just over 12% of votes nationwide. Regionally significant results were achieved by the Yugoslav Muslim Organization (JMO) winning plurality of votes in Bosnia and Herzegovina (33%). The coalition of the Slovene People's Party (SLS) and the Croatian Popular Party (HPS) won a plurality in Slovenia (37%) and Dalmatia (28%). The KPJ won the plurality of votes in Montenegro (38%). The DS won a plurality of votes in Southern Serbia (41%), the NRS in Vojvodina (47%). In Serbia, the NRS received 34% of votes, slightly outperforming the DS with 32%.

The single transferable vote system was applied to distribute the parliament seats. The system was applied separately to the ordinary and qualified candidates. This created a bias favouring best-performing parties, giving them a greater portion of the seats than they would have received otherwise. Out of 22 political parties and groups whose candidates had run for office, 16 won at least one seat. Out of 419 assembly seats, the DS and the NRS received 92 and 91 seats, respectively. The KPJ won 58 seats and the HSS 50.

Party	Votes	%	Seats
Democratic Party	319,448	19.88	92
People's Radical Party	284,575	17.71	91
Croatian Popular Peasant Party	230,590	14.35	50
Communist Party	198,736	12.37	58
Agrarian Party	151,603	9.43	39
Slovene People's Party and Croatian Popular Party (Note: The two parties submitted joint lists of candidates. The Constitutional Assembly statistical data indicate that the list won 111,274 votes. Other sources indicate that the Slovene People's Party won 58,971 votes and 14 seats, while the Croatian Popular Party, in a coalition with the Bunjevac-Šokac Party won 52,333 votes and 13 seats in the assembly. The sum of the individual figures differs from the official statistics insignificantly. In some sources, the coalition is called the Yugoslav Club.)	111,274	6.92	27
Yugoslav Muslim Organization	110,895	6.90	24
Social Democratic Party	46,792	2.91	10
Croatian Husbandmen's Party	38,400	2.39	7
Džemijet	30,029	1.87	8
Croatian Union	25,867	1.61	4
Republican Party	18,136	1.13	3
Croatian Party of Rights	10,880	0.68	2
Non-partisan list of Ante Trumbić	6,581	0.41	1
Serbian National Organisation	6,215	0.39	0
People's Socialist Party	6,186	0.38	2
Liberal Party	5,061	0.31	1
Warrior Party	2,484	0.15	0
Prekmurje Peasant Party	1,960	0.12	0
Czech Party	704	0.04	0
Independent Muslim Party	449	0.03	0
Muslim People's Party	306	0.02	0
Total	1,607,171	100.00	419
Total votes	1,607,265	–	
Registered voters/turnout	2,480,623	64.79	
Source: Constitutional Assembly; Notes: The sum of the votes cast for individual lists does not match the reported total votes cast. (Note: All sources report the total of 1,607,265 votes cast, but the numbers of votes cast for individual lists add up to an insignificantly different number.); The published results specify turnout of 64.95%. (Note: The published results specify turnout of 1.607.265 votes cast, representing 64.79% out of the total of 2.480.623 eligible voters. However, the same published results specify incorrectly that the ratio is 64.95%.)

=== Turnout ===
According to the census taken shortly after the election, nearly 12 million people lived in Yugoslavia. Out of that number, there were only 2,480,623 registered voters. And out of that number, 1,607,255 voted, representing an average turnout of 65%. The highest turnout was observed in Slovenia (73.5%), and Bosnia and Herzegovina (70%), while the lowest turnout was recorded in Serbia and Dalmatia (56% each).

The election was not held in the territories under Italian occupation in Rijeka area. Similarly, even though Dalmatia was organised initially into two electoral districts (one encompassing the territory within the jurisdiction of district courts in Split, Dubrovnik, and Kotor, and the other covering the jurisdiction of the district courts in Zadar and Šibenik), the latter was under Italian occupation and the first election did not take place there before 1923. (Note: The bulk of the Zadar–Šibenik district was formally attached to Yugoslavia days before the election, but the area remained under the Allied occupation until September 1921.)

Voter turnout per province
Province	Turnout, %
Bosnia and Herzegovina	70.08
Croatia-Slavonia	68.88
Dalmatia	56.13
Montenegro	65.97
Serbia	56.33
Southern Serbia	57.46
Slovenia	73.52
Vojvodina	64.17

== Aftermath ==
The Constitutional Assembly was convened on 12 December. Election results indicated that the electorate was nearly evenly split on the issue of centralisation of the state. The division prompted the DS and the NRS to compromise to achieve a unitary constitution of the state, and not to make any concessions to the proponents of decentralisation. The DS and the NRS formed a Serbian bloc supporting the government and its draft of what would become the Vidovdan Constitution. Since the bloc did not receive the majority of the parliamentary seats, the DS and the NRS obtained support from three other parties. The first was the JMO, which gave up its opposition to a unitary constitution in exchange for concessions that the administrative unity of Bosnia and Herzegovina within Yugoslavia would be maintained. They also obtained promises for more offices for the JMO in the provincial government, and financial compensation for the land confiscated from Bosnian Muslim landlords in the land reform in interwar Yugoslavia. Further votes came from Džemijet, representing the Muslim population in Southern Serbia. The party gave the Serbian bloc its support on similar terms to those offered to the JMO, promising Muslim landowners money in exchange for estates they stood to lose in the land reform. Finally, a faction of the Agrarian Party supported the Serbian bloc in exchange for political concessions, including the position of the Yugoslav ambassador to Czechoslovakia for the faction's leader Bogumil Vošnjak.

The Constitutional Assembly's rules of order were determined by a government decree. The rules ignored the pre-unification demand by the National Council of Slovenes, Croats and Serbs that a two-thirds majority adopt the constitution. The demand relied on wording of the Corfu Declaration calling for a qualified majority. The government argued that going beyond the majority of all members present and voting was sufficient to count as a qualified majority in the spirit of the Corfu Declaration. The Croats viewed the decision not to require a two-thirds majority as a betrayal, as they considered the Corfu Declaration a binding agreement on the need to adopt the constitution by more than a simple majority.

The election established the HSS as the leading political party in Croatia-Slavonia. It outperformed the Croatian Union and the Croatian Party of Rights (HSP) combined by about 45 percentage points. At a rally held on 8 December, Radić announced that the HSS would not participate in the work of the Constitutional Assembly because the party members advocated establishment of a republic instead of the monarchy and held the parliament a sovereign institution. Therefore, they would not swear an oath of allegiance to the king. The HSP followed the HSS and decided not to participate in the parliament. In May 1921, the Croatian Union also walked out of the parliament, protesting against the decision-making by a simple majority. On 21 May, the HSS, the HSP, and the Croatian Union, acting as the newly established Croatian Bloc coalition, drew up a declaration on behalf of their elected members of the Constitutional Assembly. In the declaration, they denied that the remaining assembly was legitimate or entitled to enact a constitution binding for Croats or Croatia.

The KPJ achieved the best 1920 election results in large cities, and in Montenegro and Macedonia as a result of protest votes against the regime's past or expected actions. These votes came from unemployed urban voters and voters in regions with no other attractive national or regional opposition parties in Slovenia, Croatia-Slavonia, and Bosnia and Herzegovina. KPJ's Sima Marković was the first to criticise the rules of order as illegal at the floor of the assembly. By the end of 1920, following a series of KPJ-led strikes, the government issued the Obznana decree, which banned communist propaganda, ordered the seizure of KPJ's newspapers and prohibited the work of organisations affiliated with the party. On 11 June 1921, the KPJ left the Constitutional Assembly. Announcing the party's decision, Filip Filipović said that the KPJ was leaving because the government had made any criticism by the opposition impossible. Two days later, the SLS also left the parliament after the speaker Ivan Ribar dismissed their request to postpone discussions on the section of the draft constitution by authority of the central government.

== See also ==
- 1920 Kingdom of Serbs, Croats and Slovenes Constitutional Assembly election in Modruš-Rijeka County

== Sources ==
- Статистички преглед избора народних посланика за Уставотворну Скупштину Краљевине Срба, Хрвата и Словенаца, извршених на дан 28. новембра 1920. год. [Statistical Review of Election of People’s Representatives to the Constitutional Assembly of the Kingdom of Serbs, Croats and Slovenes Performed on 28 November 1920] (in Serbian). Belgrade: Constitutional Assembly of the Kingdom of Serbs, Croats and Slovenes. 1921. OCLC 444781671.
- Balkovec, Bojan (2016). "Izborno zakonodavstvo prve jugoslavenske države (1918. – 1941.)" [Electoral Legislation of the First Yugoslav State (1918–1941)]. Časopis za suvremenu povijest (in Croatian). 48 (1). Zagreb: Croatian Institute of History: 197–216. ISSN 0590-9597.
- Bartulović, Željko (2004). "Skupštinski izbori u Hrvatskom primorju 1920. i 1923. godine" [Parliamentary Elections in the Croatian Littoral in Year 1920 and 1923]. Zbornik radova Pravnog fakulteta Sveučilišta u Mostaru (in Croatian). 17. Faculty of Law, University of Mostar: 225–238. ISSN 1029-4031.
- Banac, Ivo (1984). The National Question in Yugoslavia: Origins, History, Politics. Ithaca: Cornell University Press. ISBN 978-0-8014-1675-0.
- Božić, Sofija (2007). "Između Demokrata i Radikala: Produbljivanje političkih podela među Srbima u Hrvatskoj i parlamentarni izbori 1923" [Between the Democrats and the Radicals: Deepening of Serbian Political Divisions in Croatia during Parliamentary Elections of 1923]. Istorija 20. Veka (in Serbian) (2). Belgrade: Institut za savremenu istoriju: 37–59. ISSN 0352-3160.
- Davidonis, Anthony C. (1943). The American Naval Mission in the Adriatic, 1918–1921 (PDF). Washington, DC: United States Department of the Navy. OCLC 1112737551.
- Dragnich, Alex N. (1983). The First Yugoslavia: Search for a Viable Political System. Stanford: Hoover Institution Press. ISBN 978-0-8179-7841-9.
- Đorđević, Miroslav (2013). "Istorijat izbora u Kraljevini SHS i Kraljevini Jugoslaviji" [History of Elections in the Kingdom of Serbs, Croats and Slovenes and the Kingdom of Yugoslavia]. Strani pravni život (in Serbian) (3). Belgrade: Institut za uporedno pravo: 293–310. ISSN 0039-2138.
- Đorđević, Mladen (2005). "Organizacija jugoslovenskih nacionalista (ORJUNA): Istorijat – ideologija – uticaji" [The Yugoslav Nationalists Organization (ORJUNA): History-Ideology-Impact]. Nova srpska politička misao (in Serbian). 12 (1–4). Belgrade: Vreme: 187–221. ISSN 1450-7382.
- Jović, Dragiša (2000). "Hrvatska zajednica u političkom životu Slavonije, Srijema i Baranje 1919.–1920. godine" [Croatian Union (Hrvatska zajednica) in the Political Life of Slavonija, Srijem and Baranja 1919–1920]. Časopis za suvremenu povijest (in Croatian). 32 (2). Zagreb: Croatian Institute of History: 235–255. ISSN 0590-9597.
- Kosnica, Ivan; Protega, Martina (2019). "Politička prava u Kraljevini Srba, Hrvata i Slovenaca: razvoj temeljnih obilježja" [Political Rights in the Kingdom of Serbs, Croats and Slovenes: Basic Features Development]. Pravni vjesnik (in Croatian). 35 (1). Faculty of Law, University of Osijek: 139–156. doi:10.25234/pv/7989. ISSN 0352-5317.
- Lampe, John R. (2000). Yugoslavia as History: Twice There Was a Country (2nd ed.). Cambridge, UK: Cambridge University Press. ISBN 0-521-77357-1.
- MacMillan, Margaret (2002). Paris 1919: Six Months That Changed the World. New York City: Random House Publishing Group. ISBN 978-0-375-76052-5.
- Ramet, Sabrina P. (2006). The Three Yugoslavias: State-building and Legitimation, 1918–2005. Bloomington: Indiana University Press. ISBN 978-0-253-34656-8.
- Sternberger, Dolf; Vogel, Bernhard (1969). Nohlen, Dieter (ed.). Die Wahl der Parlamente und Anderer Staatsorgane [The Election of Parliaments and Other State Organs] (in German). Berlin: De Gruyter. ISBN 978-3-11-001156-2.
- Šehić, Nusret (1990). "Izbori za ustavotvornu skupštinu na području Bosne i Hercegovine (28. novembar 1920.)" [Elections for the Constituent Assembly on the Territory of Bosnia and Herzegovina (November 28, 1920)]. Prilozi (in Bosnian) (25/26). Sarajevo: Institut za istoriju: 205–241. ISSN 0350-1159.
- Vucinich, Wayne S. (1969). Contemporary Yugoslavia: Twenty Years of Socialist Experiment. Berkeley: University of California Press. ISBN 978-0-520-33111-2.
