= National Council of Slovenes, Croats and Serbs =

Political group formed in 1918

National Council of Slovenes, Croats and Serbs Narodno vijeće Slovenaca, Hrvata i Srba

Type
- Type: Unicameral house of State of Slovenes, Croats and Serbs

History
- Founded: 19 October 1918
- Disbanded: 3 December 1918
- Preceded by: Diet of Hungary
- Succeeded by: Temporary National Representation

Leadership
- President: Anton Korošec, Slovene People's Party
- Vice presidents: Svetozar Pribićević (Croat-Serb Coalition); Ante Pavelić (Milinovci)
- Secretaries: Mate Drinković; Srđan Budisavljević; Ivan Lorković
- Seats: 95

The National Council of Slovenes, Croats and Serbs (Croatian: Narodno vijeće Slovenaca, Hrvata i Srba) claimed to represent South Slavs living in Austria-Hungary and, after its dissolution, in the short-lived State of Slovenes, Croats and Serbs. The council's membership was largely drawn from various representative bodies operating in the Habsburg crown lands inhabited by South Slavs. The founding of the National Council in Zagreb on 8 October 1918 fulfilled the Zagreb Resolution to concentrate South Slavic political forces, adopted earlier that year on the initiative of the Yugoslav Club. The council elected Anton Korošec as the president and Svetozar Pribićević and Ante Pavelić as vice-presidents.

On 19 October 1918, the National Council declared itself the supreme body of the State of Slovenes, Croats and Serbs. This position was upheld by the Croatian Sabor meeting on 29 October to sever ties between Croatia-Slavonia, Dalmatia and the city of Rijeka on one hand and the Kingdom of Hungary and Austria-Hungary on the other. The National Council took part in negotiating the Geneva Declaration in early November as an agreement on unification with the Kingdom of Serbia in a confederal state. The declaration was quickly repudiated. Instead, the National Council sent a delegation to Serbia to request speedy unification, as it was facing pressure from widespread violence and disorder in the countryside and the advancing Italian Army. The delegation ignored the instructions provided by the National Council and asked for unification without any specific conditions. By early December 1918, the National Council declared the bulk of its work completed.

== Background ==
Territories within Austria–Hungary: Cisleithania (Empire of Austria): 1. Bohemia, 2. Bukovina, 3. Carinthia, 4. Carniola, 5. Dalmatia, 6. Galicia, 7. Küstenland, 8. Lower Austria, 9. Moravia, 10. Salzburg, 11. Silesia, 12. Styria, 13. Tyrol, 14. Upper Austria, 15. Vorarlberg; Transleithania (Kingdom of Hungary): 16. Hungary proper 17. Croatia-Slavonia; Austro-Hungarian condominium 18. Bosnia and Herzegovina

During World War I, several proposals advocated the political consolidation of the South Slavs living in Austria-Hungary.

=== Niš Declaration ===
The Kingdom of Serbia—an independent country from Austria-Hungary—considered the war an opportunity for territorial expansion beyond the Serb-inhabited areas of the Balkans. A committee tasked with determining the country's war aims produced a programme to establish a Yugoslav state through the addition of Croatia-Slavonia, the Slovene lands, Vojvodina, Bosnia and Herzegovina, and Dalmatia, echoing Serbian Foreign Minister Ilija Garašanin's 1844 Načertanije treatise anticipating the collapse of the Ottoman Empire, which called for the unification of all Serbs to pre-empt Russian or Austrian expansion into the Balkans. In its subsequent Niš Declaration, the Serbian government declared its war aims to liberate and unify "three tribes of one people": the Serbs, Croats, and Slovenes according to Yugoslavism.

=== Zagreb Resolution ===
Trialism in Austria-Hungary would have established a South Slavic entity in addition to the existing Cisleithanian and Transleithanian parts introduced by the Austro-Hungarian Compromise of 1867. South Slavic members of the Imperial Council organised as the Yugoslav Club and issued the trialist May Declaration.

In 1918, the Yugoslav Club tried to bring together the political parties representing the South Slavs in Austria-Hungary in favour of the "national concentration" of Slovenes, Croats, and Serbs in a common state. However, the club did not elaborate on the method or desired outcomes of such unification. A conference in Zagreb in May 1918 was attended by 43 opposition politicians from Croatia-Slavonia, politicians affiliated with the Zagreb-based Catholic daily Novine, members of the Social Democratic Party of Croatia and Slavonia, the Slovene People's Party, the National Progressive Party, as well as several politicians from Bosnia and Herzegovina, Dalmatia, Istria, and Međimurje. Croatia-Slavonia's ruling Croat-Serb Coalition and opposition Croatian People's Peasant Party were invited, but did not attend except for a number of dissidents. Attendees agreed to the Zagreb Resolution for political unification of the Croats, Slovenes, and Serbs living in Austria-Hungary.

== Role ==
=== State of Slovenes, Croats and Serbs ===
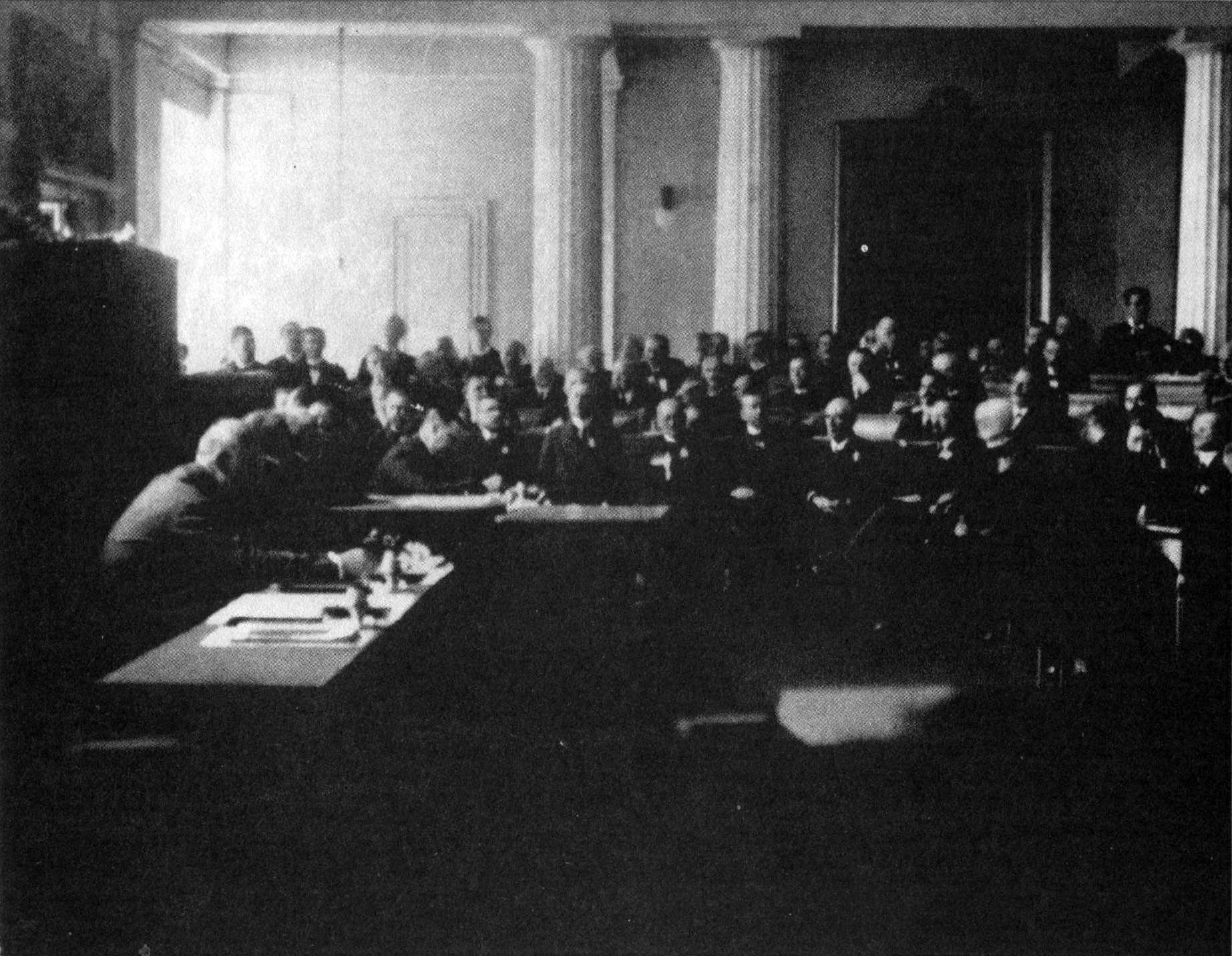
Sitting of the Croatian Sabor of 29 October 1918

To fulfill the Zagreb Resolution and work towards the political independence and unity of the South Slavs, another conference was held in Zagreb on 5–8 October 1918 and the National Council of Slovenes, Croats and Serbs was announced. Emperor Charles I tried to stave off the dissolution of Austria-Hungary by announcing a trialist reform of the empire on 16 October, but it came too late for the National Council. Instead, on 19 October, the National Council proclaimed itself the central organ of the new State of Slovenes, Croats and Serbs encompassing the Slovene lands, Croatia-Slavonia, Dalmatia, and Bosnia and Herzegovina.

On 29 October, the Croatian Sabor (nominally governing Croatia-Slavonia) severed its ties to Austria-Hungary and the Kingdom of Hungary and nullified the Croatian–Hungarian Settlement, declaring Croatia-Slavonia, together with Dalmatia and the city of Rijeka (previously organised as the Corpus separatum), a state independent of Austria and Hungary. The Croatian Sabor recognised the National Council as the supreme authority over the new state.

=== Unification with Serbia ===
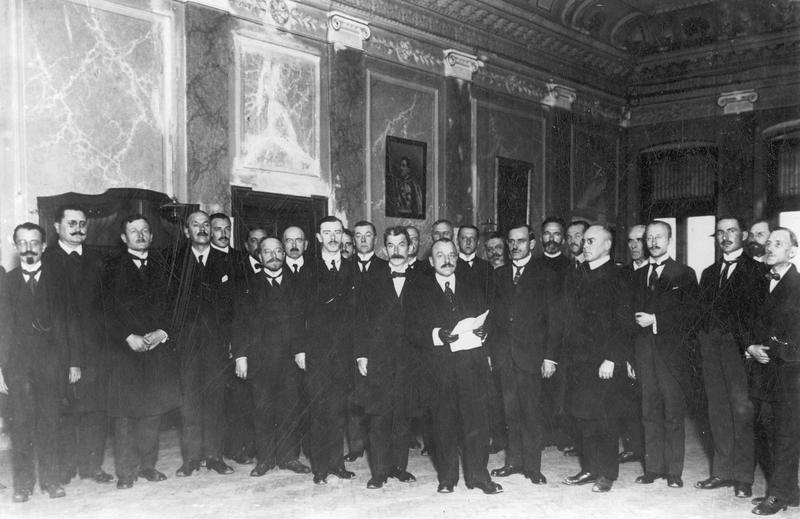
Delegation of the National Council meeting Prince Regent Alexander in Belgrade on 1 December 1918

The National Council and its representatives took part in the political unification of South Slavs through the establishment of the Kingdom of Serbs, Croats and Slovenes in late 1918. Due to lack of diplomatic experience, the council authorised the Yugoslav Committee, an ad-hoc group of politicians and activists, to speak on its behalf in international relations. After the Serbian government led by Nikola Pašić recognised the National Council as the legitimate representative of South Slavs living in the territory of Austria-Hungary, a National Council delegation, led by its president Anton Korošec, took part (jointly with the Yugoslav Committee and Serbian parliamentary opposition) in negotiations with Pašić, and signing of the Geneva Declaration on 9 November to quickly unite the State of Slovenes, Croats and Serbs with Serbia in a confederal state. Days later the declaration was repudiated by the Serbian government and the National Council's Croatian Serb vice-president, Svetozar Pribićević. Pribićević said the delegation was not authorised to conclude such an agreement.

The urgency of unification increased as security deteriorated in the countryside because of the Green Cadres, and the Italian Army advanced following the collapse of Austria-Hungary and the Armistice of Villa Giusti. By 17 November, Italian forces captured Rijeka and were advancing through Carniola, reaching the vicinity of Ljubljana—with the aim of enforcing the Treaty of London which promised Italy territorial gains in return for going to war against Austria-Hungary. In response, the National Council appealed to Serbia seeking protection against Italy. On 24 November, the National Council designated a delegation to contact the governments of Serbia and the Kingdom of Montenegro as well as other political parties in the two countries. The envoys travelled to Serbia's capital, Belgrade on 1 December where they met with Prince Regent Alexander of Serbia. At the meeting, the delegation of the National Council ignored their instructions to impose conditions on unification. Alexander proclaimed unification of the Kingdom of Serbs, Croats and Slovenes that day.

On 3 December, the delegation of the National Council declared the core work of the council completed, although stating it would continue administrative tasks for a while. The council disbanded its non-central bodies, but continued its administrative work in Zagreb until at least January 1919. The National Council decided to nominate all its members to the Temporary National Representation as the legislative body of the new state. However, the list of its representatives was drawn up by National Council member and new government minister Albert Kramer on authorisation by the regent but without input from the relevant political parties.

=== Zagreb protest ===
Shortly after proclamation of the Kingdom of Serbs, Croats and Slovenes, there was a protest of soldiers in Zagreb suppressed by forces organised and led by the National Council. In the aftermath of the events, the National Council disbanded the Zagreb-based 25th Regiment of the Royal Croatian Home Guard and the 53rd Regiment of the former Austro-Hungarian Common Army on the evening of 5 December. Furthermore, the council cited the clash and the Lipošćak affair as grounds to restrict the inclusion of Croatian officers who previously served in the Austro-Hungarian armed forces in army of the new unified state as unreliable.

== Members ==
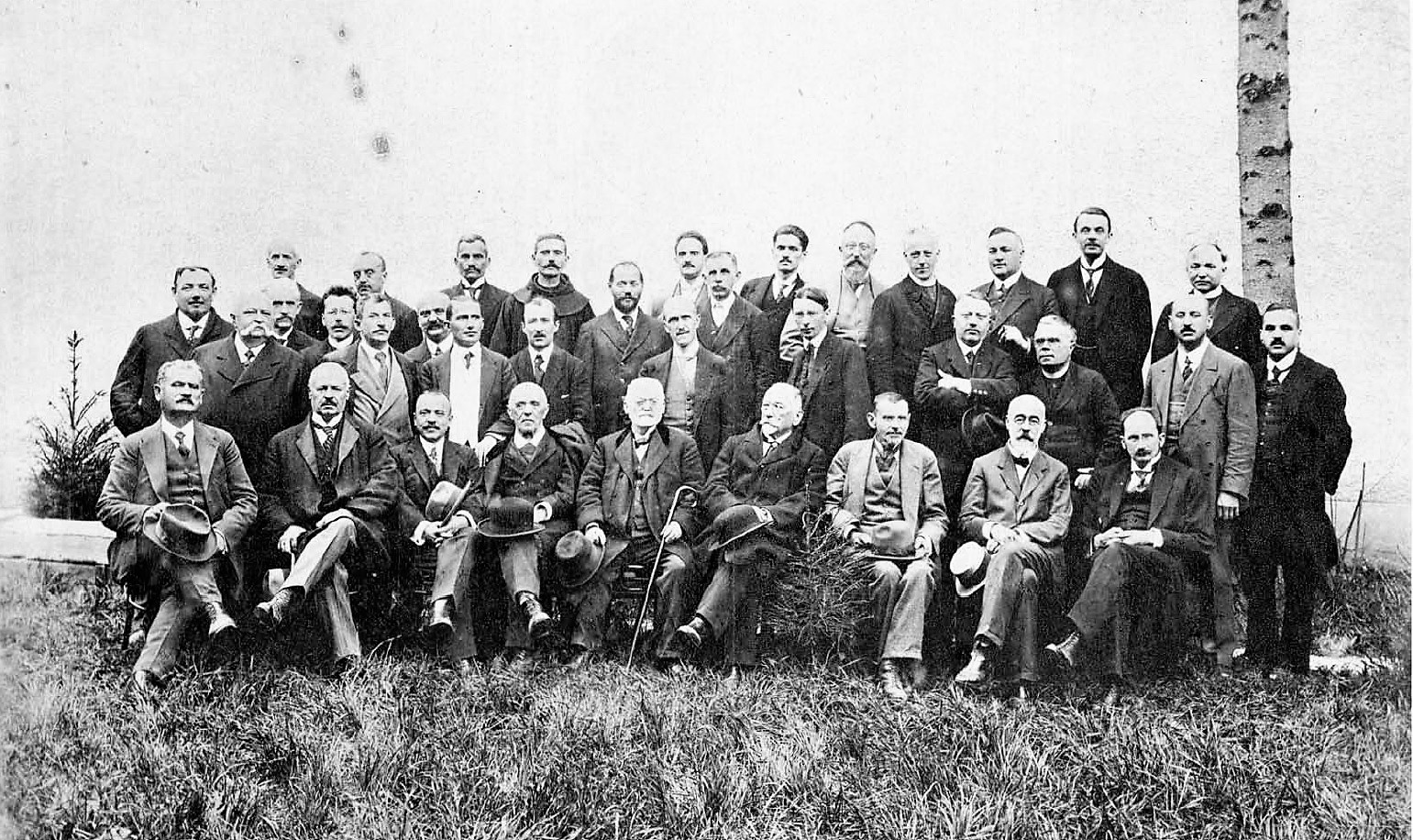
A portion of the members in Zagreb

According to the Rules of the National Council, the body consisted of 95 voting members drawn from political parties and other organisations. In practice, the National Council had fewer members. The National Council originally intended to include 18 representatives from the regions of Međimurje, Baranya, Bačka, Banat, and Prekmurje, but those seats were left largely vacant. The members were meant to be territorially diverse, to ensure proportional representation of various territories of Austria-Hungary inhabited by South Slavs. The quorum required for valid decision making by a plenary session of the National Council was one-third of the voting members. The plenum was expected to adopt its decisions by majority of two-thirds of the members present.

The plenum was required to elect up to 30 members of the National Council's central committee (and their deputies) among themselves, and two-thirds majority of the central committee had the possibility of co-option of another ten members. The central committee required a quorum of more than half of its members. It was to make decisions by two-thirds majority as well, i.e. decisions could be made by 13 members in case of the minimum quorum meeting. The central committee was to convene the plenum once every three months or if requested to do so by 15 members of the National Council. The presidency of the National Council and its central committee consisted of president Korošec, vice-presidents Pribićević and Ante Pavelić. The presidency also included three secretaries: Mate Drinković, Srđan Budisavljević, and Ivan Lorković. The central committee turned over the executive powers to the presidency, deeming it the government of the National Council on 28 October 1918.

Members of the Imperial Council, Croatian Sabor, and diets of Bosnia and Herzegovina, Istria, and Dalmatia, and members of provinical legislatures of Carniola, Styria, Carinthia, and Gorizia and Gradisca not appointed to the National Council as its voting members were allowed to attend its meetings as observers. All observers were required to comply with the Rules of the National Council.

Voting Members of the National Council of Slovenes, Croats and Serbs
Territory	Party/group	Name
Croatia-Slavonia	Croat-Serb Coalition	Živko Bertić
Croatia-Slavonia	Croat-Serb Coalition	Edmund Lukinić
Croatia-Slavonia	Croat-Serb Coalition	Milutin Mažurainć
Croatia-Slavonia	Croat-Serb Coalition	Bogdan Medaković
Croatia-Slavonia	Croat-Serb Coalition	Ivan Paleček
Croatia-Slavonia	Croat-Serb Coalition	Dušan Peleš
Croatia-Slavonia	Croat-Serb Coalition	Dušan Popović
Croatia-Slavonia	Croat-Serb Coalition	Svetozar Pribićević
Croatia-Slavonia	Croat-Serb Coalition	Ivan Ribar
Croatia-Slavonia	Croat-Serb Coalition	Makso Rošić
Croatia-Slavonia	Croat-Serb Coalition	Stevan Simeonović-Čokić
Croatia-Slavonia	Croat-Serb Coalition	Većeslav Wilder
Croatia-Slavonia	Milinovci	Cezar Akačić
Croatia-Slavonia	Milinovci	Budislav Grga Angjelinović
Croatia-Slavonia	Milinovci	Ante Pavelić
Croatia-Slavonia	Milinovci	Živko Petričić
Croatia-Slavonia	Milinovci	Svetozar Rittig
Croatia-Slavonia	Milinovci	Nikola Winterhalter
Croatia-Slavonia	Croatian People's Peasant Party	Karla Kovačević
Croatia-Slavonia	Croatian People's Peasant Party	Stjepan Radić
Croatia-Slavonia	Serb People's Radical Party	Žarko Miladinović
Croatia-Slavonia	Serb People's Radical Party	Milan Nedeljković
Croatia-Slavonia	Social Democratic Party	Vilim Bukšeg
Croatia-Slavonia	Social Democratic Party	Vitomir Korać
Croatia-Slavonia	Glas SHS Group	Srđan Budisavljević
Croatia-Slavonia	Male Novine Group	Ivan Lorković
Croatia-Slavonia	Novine Group	Janko Šimrak
Croatia-Slavonia	Co-opted members of the central committee with plenum voting rights	Fran Barac
Croatia-Slavonia	Co-opted members of the central committee with plenum voting rights	Stjepan Srkulj
Rijeka		Rikard Lenac
Međimurje		Ivan Novak
Dalmatia	National Organisation for Dalmatia	Stanko Banić
Dalmatia	National Organisation for Dalmatia	Gajo Bulat
Dalmatia	National Organisation for Dalmatia	Uroš Desnica
Dalmatia	National Organisation for Dalmatia	Mate Drinković
Dalmatia	National Organisation for Dalmatia	Prvislav Grisogono
Dalmatia	National Organisation for Dalmatia	Ivo Krstelj
Dalmatia	National Organisation for Dalmatia	Milan Marušić
Dalmatia	Co-opted members of the central committee with plenum voting rights	Josip Smodlaka
Dalmatia	Co-opted members of the central committee with plenum voting rights	Ante Tresić Pavičić
Dalmatia	Co-opted members of the central committee with plenum voting rights	Božidar Vukotić
Istria	Political Society for Croats and Slovenes in Istria	Gjuro Červar
Istria	Political Society for Croats and Slovenes in Istria	Josip Grašić
Istria	Political Society for Croats and Slovenes in Istria	Šime Kurelić
Istria	Co-opted member of the central committee with plenum voting rights	Matko Laginja
Bosnia and Herzegovina	Representing political parties	Tugomir Alaupović
Bosnia and Herzegovina	Representing political parties	Vojislav Besarović
Bosnia and Herzegovina	Representing political parties	Didak Buntić
Bosnia and Herzegovina	Representing political parties	Luka Čabrajić
Bosnia and Herzegovina	Representing political parties	Vladimir Ćorović
Bosnia and Herzegovina	Representing political parties	Ljubomir Galić
Bosnia and Herzegovina	Representing political parties	Maksim Gjurković
Bosnia and Herzegovina	Representing political parties	Šćepan Grđić
Bosnia and Herzegovina	Representing political parties	Gligorije Jeftanović
Bosnia and Herzegovina	Representing political parties	Vjekoslav Jelavić
Bosnia and Herzegovina	Representing political parties	Milan Jojkić
Bosnia and Herzegovina	Representing political parties	Dušan Kecmanović
Bosnia and Herzegovina	Representing political parties	Kosta Kujundžić
Bosnia and Herzegovina	Representing political parties	Savo Ljubibratić
Bosnia and Herzegovina	Representing political parties	Mehmed Spaho
Bosnia and Herzegovina	Representing political parties	Jozo Sunarić
Bosnia and Herzegovina	Representing political parties	Hamid Svrzo
Bosnia and Herzegovina	Representing political parties	Vojislav Šola
Bosnia and Herzegovina	Representing the Diet of Bosnia	Danilo Dimović
Bosnia and Herzegovina	Representing the Diet of Bosnia	Đuro Džamonja
Bosnia and Herzegovina	Representing the Diet of Bosnia	Simo Eraković
Bosnia and Herzegovina	Representing the Diet of Bosnia	Halid-beg Hrasnica
Bosnia and Herzegovina	Representing the Diet of Bosnia	Pero Stokanović
Slovene Lands	Slovene People's Party	Ivan Benkovič
Slovene Lands	Slovene People's Party	Izidor Cankar
Slovene Lands	Slovene People's Party	Josip Jerič
Slovene Lands	Slovene People's Party	Anton Korošec
Slovene Lands	Slovene People's Party	Lovro Pogačnik
Slovene Lands	Slovene People's Party	Bogumil Remec
Slovene Lands	Slovene People's Party	Franc Smodej
Slovene Lands	Yugoslav Democratic Party	Ivan Hribar
Slovene Lands	Yugoslav Democratic Party	Albert Kramer
Slovene Lands	Yugoslav Democratic Party	Vekoslav Kukovec
Slovene Lands	Yugoslav Democratic Party	Vladimir Ravnihar
Slovene Lands	Yugoslav Social-Democratic Party	vacant seat
Trieste	Edinost Political Society	Ivan Marija Čok
Five unnamed members of the Yugoslav Club (five votes)

Members and Deputy Members of the National Council's Central Committee
Party/group	Members	Deputy Members
Croat-Serb Coalition	Ivan Paleček	Makso Rošić
Croat-Serb Coalition	Edmund Lukinić	Dušan Peleš
Croat-Serb Coalition	Većeslav Wilder	Živko Bertić
Croat-Serb Coalition	Dušan Popović	Stevan Simeonović-Čokić
Croat-Serb Coalition	Svetozar Pribićević	Ivan Ribar
Milinovci	Ante Pavelić	Cezar Akačić
Milinovci	Živko Petričić	Nikola Winterhalter
Croatian People's Peasant Party	Stjepan Radić	Karla Kovačević
Serb People's Radical Party	Žarko Miladinović	Milan Nedeljković
Social Democratic Party	Vilim Bukšeg	—N/a
Glas SHS Group	Srđan Budisavljević	Hinko Krizman
Male Novine Group	Ivan Lorković	Đuro Šurmin
Narodna Politika Group	Janko Šimrak	—N/a
Co-opted members from Croatia-Slavonia	Fran Barac	—N/a
Co-opted members from Croatia-Slavonia	Stjepan Srkulj	—N/a
Co-opted members from Croatia-Slavonia	Vitomir Korać	Svetozar Delić
Međimurje	Ivan Novak	—N/a
National Organisation for Dalmatia	Mate Drinković	Uroš Desnica
National Organisation for Dalmatia	Prvislav Grisogono	Milan Marušić
National Organisation for Dalmatia	Ivo Krstelj	—N/a
Co-opted members from Dalmatia	Božidar Vukotić	—N/a
Co-opted members from Dalmatia	Josip Smodlaka	—N/a
Co-opted members from Dalmatia	Ante Tresić Pavičić	—N/a
Istria	Gjuro Červar	Josip Grašić
Co-opted member from Istria	Matko Laginja	—N/a
Bosnia and Herzegovina	Jozo Sunarić	Dušan Kecmanović
Bosnia and Herzegovina	Vojislav Šola	Vjekoslav Jelavić
Bosnia and Herzegovina	Milan Jojkić	Vladimir Ćorović
Bosnia and Herzegovina	Šćepan Grđić	Tugomir Alaupović
Bosnia and Herzegovina	Savo Ljubibratić	Hamid Svrzo
Bosnia and Herzegovina	Luka Čabrajić	Đuro Džamonja
Co-opted members from Bosnia and Herzegovina	Danilo Dimović	—N/a
Co-opted members from Bosnia and Herzegovina	Ljubomir Galić	—N/a
Slovene People's Party	Anton Korošec	Ivan Benkovič
Slovene People's Party	Lovro Pogačnik	Bogumil Remec
Slovene People's Party	Izidor Cankar	Josip Jerič
Yugoslav Democratic Party	Ivan Hribar	Vekoslav Kukovec
Yugoslav Democratic Party	Albert Kramer	Slavko Fornazarič
Trieste	Ivan Marija Čok	Josip Vilfan

== Sources ==
- Banac, Ivo (1984). The National Question in Yugoslavia: Origins, History, Politics. Ithaca, New York: Cornell University Press. ISBN 0-8014-1675-2.
- Boban, Ljubo (1993). "Kada je i kako nastala Država Slovenaca, Hrvata i Srba" [When and How Did the State of Slovenes, Croats, And Serbs Come into Existence]. Journal of the Institute of Croatian History (in Croatian). 26 (1). Zagreb: Croatian Institute of History: 187–198. ISSN 0353-295X.
- Headlam, James Wycliffe (1911). "Austria-Hungary" . In Chisholm, Hugh (ed.). Encyclopædia Britannica. Vol. 3 (11th ed.). Cambridge University Press.
- Lampe, John R. (2000). Yugoslavia as History: Twice There Was a Country (2nd ed.). Cambridge: Cambridge University Press. ISBN 0-521-77357-1.
- Matijević, Zlatko (2008). "Narodno vijeće Slovenaca, Hrvata i Srba u Zagrebu: Osnutak, djelovanje i nestanak (1918/1919)" [National Council of Slovenes, Croats and Serbs in Zagreb: Founding, Actions and Disappearance (1918/1919)]. Fontes: Izvori Za Hrvatsku Povijest (in Croatian). 14 (1). Zagreb: Croatian State Archives: 35–66. ISSN 1330-6804.
- Newman, John Paul (2015). Yugoslavia in the Shadow of War: Veterans and the Limits of State Building, 1903–1945. Cambridge: Cambridge University Press. ISBN 9781107070769.
- Pavlowitch, Kosta St. (2003). "The First World War and Unification of Yugoslavia". In Djokic, Dejan (ed.). Yugoslavism: Histories of a Failed Idea, 1918–1992. London: C. Hurst & Co. pp. 27–41. ISBN 1-85065-663-0.
- Pavlowitch, Stevan K. (2014). A History of the Balkans 1804-1945. Abingdon-on-Thames: Routledge. ISBN 9781317900177.
- Ramet, Sabrina P. (2006). The Three Yugoslavias: State-Building and Legitimation, 1918–2005. Bloomington: Indiana University Press. ISBN 978-0-253-34656-8.
- Šišić, Ferdo (1920). Dokumenti o postanku Kraljevine Srba, Hrvata i Slovenaca 1914–1919. Sabrao ih F. Šišić [Documents on Genesis of the Kingdom of Serbs, Croats and Slovenes 1914–1919; Collected by F. Šišić] (in Croatian). Zagreb: Matica hrvatska. OCLC 504490993.
- Štambuk-Škalić, Marina; Matijević, Zlatko, eds. (2008). "Narodno vijeće Slovenaca, Hrvata i Srba u Zagrebu 1918–1919. (izabrani dokumenti)" [National Council of Slovenes, Croats and Serbs in Zagreb 1918–1919 (Selected Documents)]. Fontes: Izvori Za Hrvatsku Povijest (in Croatian). 14 (1). Zagreb: Croatian State Archives: 71–596. ISSN 1330-6804.
- Zorko, Tomislav (2003). "Afera Lipošćak" [The Lipošćak Affair]. Časopis za suvremenu povijest (in Croatian). 35 (3). Zagreb: Croatian Institute of History: 887–902. ISSN 0590-9597.
