= Fran Barac =

Croatian and Yugoslavian politician and theologian

- Born: 26 August 1872; Šemovci, Croatia-Slavonia, Austria-Hungary (now Croatia)
- Died: 20 September 1940 (aged 68); Zagreb, Yugoslavia (now Croatia)
- Education: University of Zagreb; University of Leuven
- Occupations: Politician, priest, theologian
- Political party: Croatian Union; Croatian Federalist Peasant Party

Fran Barac (26 August 1872 – 20 September 1940) was a Croatian and Yugoslavian politician, a theologian and a priest. He graduated theology from the Catholic Faculty of Theology, University of Zagreb and was ordained in 1895. Barac taught religion at the Požega Gymnasium in two periods between 1895 and 1909, completing post-graduate study and obtaining a doctoral degree at the University of Leuven in the meantime. He became a professor at the Zagreb University in 1911, the dean of the Faculty of Theology in 1913–1914 and 1922–1923, and the rector of the Zagreb University in 1915–1916.

During the World War I, Barac acted as an intermediary between the Mile Starčević faction of the Party of Rights (he supported) and the Yugoslav Committee, an ad-hoc group of activists and politicians working towards dissolution of Austria-Hungary and specifically political unification of the South Slavs. After the war, Barac was appointed a member of the National Council of Slovenes, Croats and Serbs—the political body which took the role of the provisional legislative and ruling body in the South Slavic areas of former Austria-Hungary. Subsequently, he was also appointed a member of the Temporary National Representation as a provisional legislative body of the newly proclaimed Kingdom of Serbs, Croats and Slovenes. Barac was appointed the kingdom's expert at the Paris Peace Conference (1919–1920) tasked with preparing a study of political attitudes of Croats and Slovenes during the war. He was active for a while in the Croatian Union before joining the Croatian Federalist Peasant Party and becoming its vice-president. Barac advocated reforming the Kingdom of Serbs, Croats and Slovenes into a federal state.
