= Živko Bertić =

Croatian and Yugoslavian politician and writer

- Born: 20 February 1875; Kukujevci, Croatia-Slavonia, Austria-Hungary
- Died: 25 October 1938 (aged 63); Belgrade, Yugoslavia
- Education: Charles University; University of Zagreb
- Occupations: Politician, lawyer, writer
- Political party: Croat-Serb Coalition; Croatian Union

Živko Bertić, also Živan Bertić (20 February 1875 – 25 October 1938) was a Croatian and Yugoslavian politician, lawyer and writer.

== Biography ==
Bertić was born on 20 February 1875 in Kukujevci, Croatia-Slavonia, Austria-Hungary (now Serbia). He studied law at the Faculty of Law, University of Zagreb until he took part in the protest involving burning of a Flag of Hungary on the occasion of the 1895 visit by Emperor Franz Joseph to Zagreb—resulting in a prison sentence and expulsion from the university. He relocated to Prague. There he edited Hrvatska misao and Novo doba journals and graduated from the Charles University. He obtained a doctoral degree in law from the Zagreb University in 1902 before pursuing a legal career—first briefly in judiciary in Mitrovica and then in his own law firm established in Zemun.

Bertić was a member of the Croat-Serb Coalition and the elected representative of the Varaždin district in the Croatian Sabor in 1918. In the final days of the World War I, he was appointed a member of the National Council of Slovenes, Croats and Serbs—the body established with the aim of political unification of the South Slavs. Following proclamation of the newly established Kingdom of Serbs, Croats and Slovenes, Bertić was also appointed a member of the Temporary National Representation, a provisional legislative body of the new country in 1919–1920. He joined the Croatian Union, but left politics soon after.

Bertić published short prose from the time of his secondary education in Osijek. He published some of his works under various pseudonyms, especially as "Živan iz Srema" (lit. Živan from Syrmia). His literary works include:

- Zgode i nezgode jedne deputacije, (1902)
- Ženski udesi, (1902)
- Oszlicz Szillard i njegov certifikat, (1911)
- Na velike škole, (1917)
- Hrvatska politika, (1927)
- Predlog izvršenja na pokretnine, (1936)
