= Karla Kovačević =

- Born: 25 October 1870; Jazavica (near Rajić) Croatia-Slavonia, Austria-Hungary (now Croatia)
- Died: 6 July 1942 (aged 71); Stara Gradiška, Independent State of Croatia (now Croatia)
- Occupation: Politician
- Political party: Croatian People's Peasant Party; Yugoslav National Party

Karla Kovačević, also Dragutin Kovačević and Karlo Kovačević (25 October 1870 – 6 July 1942) was a Croatian and Yugoslavian politician and a leading member of the Croatian People's Peasant Party (HSS) from 1905 until the 1920s. He was elected a member of the Croatian Sabor in the 1910 Croatian parliamentary election in the constituency of Novska. In 1918, Kovačević was appointed a member of the National Council of Slovenes, Croats and Serbs—a body working towards political unification of the South Slavs in the processes of dissolution of Austria-Hungary and establishment of the Kingdom of Serbs, Croats and Slovenes. Together with party leader Stjepan Radić, he was appointed a member of the Temporary National Representation, the provisional legislative body of the newly established Kingdom of Serbs, Croats and Slovenes (later renamed the Kingdom of Yugoslavia). Kovačević was elected to the Constitutional Assembly in the 1920 election, as well as in 1923 and 1925 elections in Požega County and in 1927 election in Virovitica County. Following the introduction of the 6 January Dictatorship in Yugoslavia, Kovačević supported the dictatorship of King Alexander. In turn, Kovačević was promoted by the dictatorial regime as the leader of the peasantry in the country in the 1930s. In that period, Kovačević publicly criticised the HSS (led by Vladko Maček after the assassination of Radić) as well as the Croatian emigre fascist and ultranationalist organisation Ustaše. Kovačević joined the Yugoslav Radical Peasants' Democracy (subsequently renamed the Yugoslav National Party, JNS) and became its vice-president in 1933. As a JNS candidate, Kovačević was elected in the 1931 Yugoslavian parliamentary election and the deputy president of the Assembly of Yugoslavia. Following an electoral defeat in the 1935 election, he left politics. After the World War II Axis powers Invasion of Yugoslavia and establishment of the Axis puppet state of Independent State of Croatia in 1941, Kovačević was imprisoned—initially in Novska and Zagreb. He was then moved to the Jasenovac concentration camp and finally to the Stara Gradiška concentration camp where he was killed.
