= Cezar Akačić =

Croatian and Yugoslavian politician

- Born: 29 May 1868; Bakar, Croatia-Slavonia, Austria-Hungary (now Croatia)
- Died: 6 September 1935 (aged 67); Zagreb, Yugoslavia (now Croatia)
- Education: University of Zagreb
- Occupation: Politician
- Political party: Party of Rights; Croatian Union

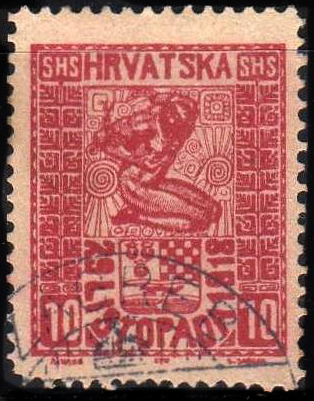
Postage stamp of the State of Slovenes, Croats and Serbs issued in Croatia

Cezar Akačić (29 May 1868 – 6 September 1935) was a Croatian and Yugoslavian politician. He graduated pharmacy from the Zagreb University. He became the deputy head of the union of the Croatian Sokol movement societies in 1906. Akačić was an associate of Frano Supilo and a member of the Mile Starčević faction of the Party of Rights. He was elected to the Croatian Sabor in the 1910 Croatian parliamentary election in the district of Ivanec. Subsequently, Akačić became the deputy president of the party, and the chairman of its publishing company. In the final days of the World War I, Akačić was appointed a member of the National Council of Slovenes, Croats and Serbs—the political body which took the role of the provisional legislative and ruling body in the South Slavic areas of former Austria-Hungary organised as the State of Slovenes, Croats and Serbs.

The National Council named him commissioner for postal, telegraph, and telephone services. In this capacity, Akačić organised printing and introduction of the first Croatian postage stamp. Following proclamation of the Kingdom of Serbs, Croats and Slovenes in December 1918, Akačić was appointed a member of the Temporary National Representation of the new country. He was a part of the kingdom's delegation at the Paris Peace Conference (1919–1920) as an expert on issues related to the Adriatic question, specifically in relation to the regions of Istria and the Croatian Littoral. Akačić was among the founders of the Croatian Union in 1919. Disappointed with inequality of Croatia in the new country, Akačić left politics in early 1920s.
