= John Lampe =

John Lampe could refer to:

- John Frederick Lampe (1703-1751), German-English composer
- John R. Lampe (1935–2024), American history professor
