= Mate Drinković =

Croatian and Yugoslavian politician and physician (1868-1931)

- Born: 29 April 1868; Jelsa, Dalmatia, Austria-Hungary (now Croatia)
- Died: 18 May 1931 (aged 63); Vienna, Austria
- Resting place: Mirogoj Cemetery, Zagreb
- Education: University of Graz
- Occupation: Politician
- Political party: Party of Rights; Croatian Bloc

Mate Drinković (29 April 1868 – 18 May 1931) was a physician and Croatian and Yugoslavian politician.

Drinković was born in Jelsa and graduated from the University of Graz obtaining a degree in medicine before practising in Ston, Vodice, and Šibenik. Drinković was a supporter of the Party of Rights and became a member of the leadership of the party's Dalmatian chapter in 1908. In the 1908 Dalmatian parliamentary election, he was elected a member of the Diet of Dalmatia on the Party of Rights ticket. Drinković supported the Rijeka Resolution calling on the unification of the Kingdom of Croatia-Slavonia and Dalmatia. He also advocated for the dissolution of Austria-Hungary and the creation of a common South-Slavic state. This led to Drinković's arrest, trial, and conviction of treason in 1914. He was imprisoned until a general amnesty in 1917. A year later, Drinković took part in the establishment of the short-lived State of Slovenes, Croats and Serbs carved out of Austria-Hungary at the conclusion of the World War I. He was a member of the central committee of the National Council, and national defence commissioner of the new state. In the latter capacity, Drinković took part in organisation of 1918 occupation of Međimurje resulting in the addition of Međimurje region to the newly formed Kingdom of Serbs, Croats and Slovenes. He was a member of the National Council's delegation sent to Belgrade to arrange establishment of the new South-Slavic state through the unification of the State of Slovenes, Croats and Serbs with the Kingdom of Serbia.

In the constituent assembly of the new kingdom, Drinković spoke against centralisation of the country. Displeased with the 1921 Vidovdan Constitution, he abstained from parliamentary work even though he was elected a member of the parliament as an independent candidate in the 1920 Kingdom of Serbs, Croats and Slovenes Constitutional Assembly election. In 1921, Drinković took part in establishment of the Croatian Bloc coalition of the Party of Rights, the Croatian Republican Peasant Party, and the Croatian Community. Subsequently, his political views gradually changed towards the advocation of integral Yugoslavism. In the 1920s, Drinković held ministerial positions in various governments: He was the post and telegraph minister in 1920 governments of Ljubomir Davidović and Stojan Protić, a minister without portfolio in 1924–1925 Nikola Pašić government and the minister of social policy in the 1928 Anton Korošec government. During the 6 January Dictatorship, Drinković became the minister of social policy and people's health in the Petar Živković government, and once again the minister without portfolio. Drinković died from pneumonia in Vienna, and was buried at the Mirogoj Cemetery in Zagreb.
