= Zagreb Points =

1932 political document in the Kingdom of Yugoslavia

The Zagreb Points (Croatian: Zagrebačke punktacije) was the name of a resolution released on November 7, 1932, in the Kingdom of Yugoslavia which condemned Serb hegemony in that country and called for a return to political life as it was in 1918.

The document was released after the January 6 Dictatorship of King Alexander resulted in new administrative subdivisions and a new royal constitution. It had the backing of the Peasant-Democratic Coalition and the Croatian Party of Rights. The document resulted in other parties producing the Novi Sad Points, Sarajevo Points (Yugoslav Muslim Organization) and Ljubljana Points (Slovene People's Party) to voice their demands for an end to the dictatorship. Croatian Peasant Party leader Vladko Maček was imprisoned for three years due to his involvement with the document.

== Contributors ==
=== Croatian Peasant Party ===
- Vladko Maček
- Ante Trumbić
- Josip Predavec
- Juraj Šutej

=== Independent Democratic Party ===
- Dušan Bošković
- Dušan Kecmanović
- Sava Kosanović
- Većeslav Wilder
- Hinko Krizman

=== Croatian Party of Rights ===
- Mile Budak
