= Šimun Debelić =

Independent State of Croatia politician

Šimun Debelić (26 January 1902 – May 1945) was a Croatian veterinarian and professor at the University of Zagreb.

He was born in Prkovci, finished local schooling in 1912, and a gymnasium in Vinkovci in 1920. He studied to be a veterinarian at the University of Zagreb, graduating in 1926 and achieving a doctorate by 1928. Domestically, he worked in Skoplje and Zagreb. He went to the United States of America in 1930 for specialization, and later to Germany and Switzerland as well in 1931 and 1932. On 12 October 1932, he became a docent at the Veterinary Faculty in Zagreb. In 1936 he became a part-time professor, and in 1940 he was accepted for full-time.

In the Banovina of Croatia he headed the Veterinary Department and from 1941 he served as undersecretary in the Independent State of Croatia's Ministry of National Economy. He remained in the city of Zagreb after the defeat of the Independent State of Croatia and the entrance of Yugoslav Partisans into the city on May 8, 1945. He was captured by the Partisans on May 17 and killed soon after, in Zagreb.

== Family ==
He was married to Vlasta Lorković, daughter of Ivan Lorković and sister of Mladen Lorković. The couple had two sons, Mladen and Nikola. Mladen Debelić was a well-known doctor in his own right, and Nikola Debelić served as Croatian diplomat after the nation's independence in 1991.
