= Vilim Bukšeg =

Croatian and Yugoslavian politician

- Born: 24 November 1874; Zagreb, Croatia-Slavonia, Austria-Hungary (now Croatia)
- Died: 1 March 1924 (aged 49); Zagreb, Kingdom of Serbs, Croats and Slovenes (now Croatia)
- Occupations: Typographer, politician
- Political party: Social Democratic Party of Croatia and Slavonia

Vilim Bukšeg (24 November 1874 – 1 March 1924) was a Croatian and Yugoslavian politician. He was a typographer, a prominent member of the reformist wing of the Social Democratic Party of Croatia and Slavonia (SDHS) and a trade union activist. He was one of the founders of the socialist workers' movement in Croatia. Bukšeg was a representative of the SDHS in its meeting with the Croat-Serb Coalition held in 1906 when the SDHS joined the Coalition. He led cooperation of trade unions in Croatia-Slavonia between 1906 and 1914 when trade unions were abolished in the country. Bukšeg represented Croatian socialists at several congresses of Austrian and Hungarian socialists as well as the First South-Slavic Socialist Conference held in Ljubljana in 1909. In 1918, Bukšeg was appointed a representative of the SDHS in the National Council of Slovenes, Croats and Serbs which pursued dismantling of Austria-Hungary and supported political unification of the South Slavs in the aftermath of the First World War. After proclamation of the Kingdom of Serbs, Croats and Slovenes (KSHS) in late 1918, Bukšeg was appointed the minister for social welfare in provincial government of Croatia-Slavonia before joining the government of the KSHS led by Ljubomir Davidović, performing the role of the minister for nutrition and reconstruction of the country from August 1919 to February 1920. When the Federation of Trade Unions of Yugoslavia was founded in January 1922, Bukšeg was elected the president of the Federation.
