= Gajo Bulat (politician, born 1867) =

Croatian and Yugoslavian politician (1867 – 1927)

- Born: 8 June 1867; Zadar, Dalmatia, Austria-Hungary (now Croatia)
- Died: 21 March 1927 (aged 59); Split, Kingdom of Serbs, Croats and Slovenes (now Croatia)
- Education: University of Graz
- Occupations: Politician, lawyer
- Political party: Croatian Party; Democratic Party; Independent Democratic Party
- Relatives: Gajo Filomen Bulat (uncle)

Gajo Bulat (8 June 1867 – 21 March 1927) was a Croatian and Yugoslavian politician and lawyer. He studied law at the University of Zagreb, the University of Vienna and the University of Graz before graduating and starting legal career working in his the law firm of his paternal uncle and Mayor of Split Gajo Filomen Bulat. After the uncle's death 1900, Bulat continued to work in the law firm, taking it over in 1911.

Bulat was a member of the Croatian Party, the political party created by merger of the People's Party and the Party of Rights in the Austro-Hungarian Kingdom of Dalmatia in 1905. He was the party's representative in the Diet of Dalmatia from 1910 until 1918. In the process of dissolution of Austria-Hungary, Bulat was elected the president of the National Council of Slovenes, Croats and Serbs for Dalmatia and appointed a member of the National Council of Slovenes, Croats and Serbs based in Zagreb as the hierarchically superior body. Both organisations were established with the aim of political unification of the South Slavs.

After the end of the World War I and proclamation of the Kingdom of Serbs, Croats and Slovenes in December 1918, Bulat was appointed a commissioner for transport and public works in the provincial government of Dalmatia. He joined the Democratic Party and subsequently switched to Independent Democratic Party.
