= Temporary National Representation =

Interim parliament in the Kingdom of Serbs, Croats and Slovenes, 1919–1920

Temporary National Representation Privremeno narodno predstavništvo

Type
- Type: First legislative body of Kingdom of Serbs, Croats, and Slovenes

History
- Founded: February 24, 1919
- Disbanded: November 28, 1920
- Succeeded by: Assembly of the Kingdom of Serbs, Croats and Slovenes

Leadership
- President: Dragoljub Pavlović; 1919–1920
- President: Stanojlo Vukčević; 1920
- Seats: 294

The Temporary National Representation (Serbo-Croatian: Privremeno narodno predstavništvo), also the Interim National Legislation and the Interim National Parliament, was the first legislative body established in the Kingdom of Serbs, Croats and Slovenes. It was created by the decree of Prince Regent Alexander on 24 February 1919, and convened on 1 March. Its 294 members were appointed by various provincial and regional assemblies or commissions. The main product of its work was the act regulating the election of the Constitutional Assembly. The body's work ceased after the election held on 28 November 1920.

The seats in the Temporary National Representation were distributed by province and then assigned to various political parties depending on their representation in provincial and regional legislative bodies prior to the establishment of the Kingdom of Serbs, Croats and Slovenes. The greatest number of seats were assigned to the Democratic Party and the People's Radical Party. The largest traditionally Slovene political party in the interim parliament was the Slovene People's Party. The largest Croatian political party in the Temporary National Representation was the Croatian Union.

The Temporary National Representation was set up primarily to prepare for the election of the Constituent Assembly according to the 1917 Corfu Declaration of the government of the Kingdom of Serbia and the Yugoslav Committee on the creation of a common state of the South Slavs after the World War One. While the Constituent Assembly was to determine the constitution of the new country, the work of the Temporary National Representation was affected by the political struggle of those for and against higher levels of state administrative centralisation. The proponents of greater centralisation successfully used the period of work of the interim parliament to gain an advantage over other designs for the constitution of the country.

== Background ==
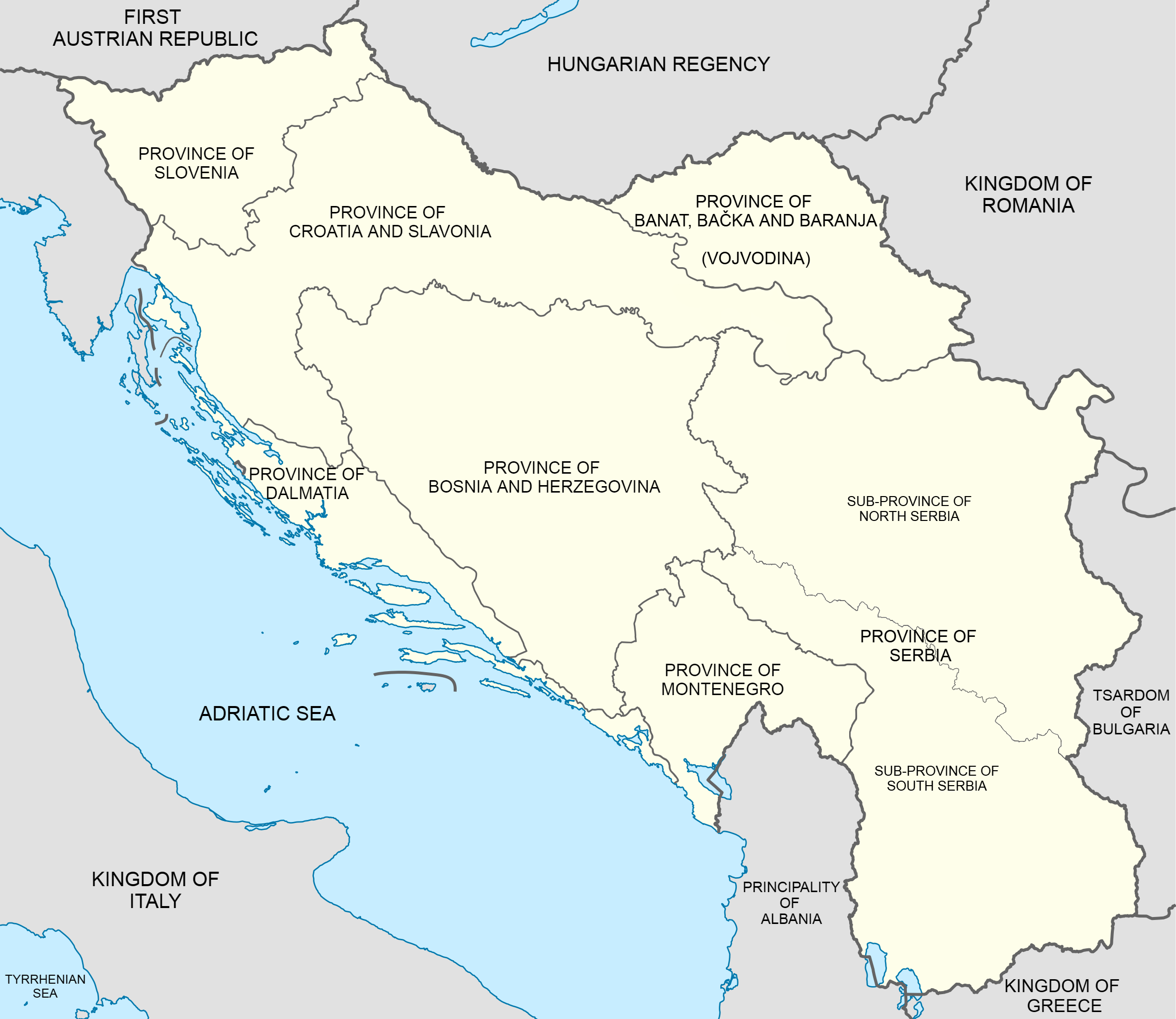
Provinces of the Kingdom of Serbs, Croats and Slovenes in 1918–1922

On 1 December 1918, Prince Regent Alexander proclaimed the Kingdom of Serbs, Croats and Slovenes. The country was created as a common state of the South Slavs. It was the result of the unification of the Kingdom of Serbia (which had previously annexed the Kingdom of Montenegro and the territories of Banat, Bačka and Baranja, jointly referred to as Vojvodina) with the short-lived State of Slovenes, Croats and Serbs. The latter was established in the South Slavic parts of the former Austria-Hungary during the dissolution of Austria-Hungary in the final days of the World War One. In his proclamation, Regent Alexander promised a provisional parliament that would be set up by agreement of the National Council of Slovenes, Croats and Serbs as the governing body in the former Austro-Hungarian lands and representatives of Serbia. Establishment of an interim parliament was also envisaged by the 1917 Corfu Declaration of the Kingdom of Serbia and the Yugoslav Committee, announcing their intention to establish a common state of the South Slavs following the eventual defeat of Austria-Hungary in World War One.

The first government of the kingdom was appointed by Regent Alexander alone. The principal political parties started negotiations of the government on 11 December 1918 and came to an agreement that Nikola Pašić should be the prime minister. Regardless of the agreement, on 20 December, Regent Alexander appointed Stojan Protić (People's Radical Party, NRS) the prime minister. Even though the prime minister belonged to the NRS, 11 of 17 government ministers were drawn from the Democratic Party (DS). Most prominent among them was the interior minister Svetozar Pribićević. While Ljubomir Davidović was the formal leader of the DS, Pribićević was seen as the party's "key man". Pribićević's position was reinforced by his close relationship with Regent Alexander.

== Establishment ==
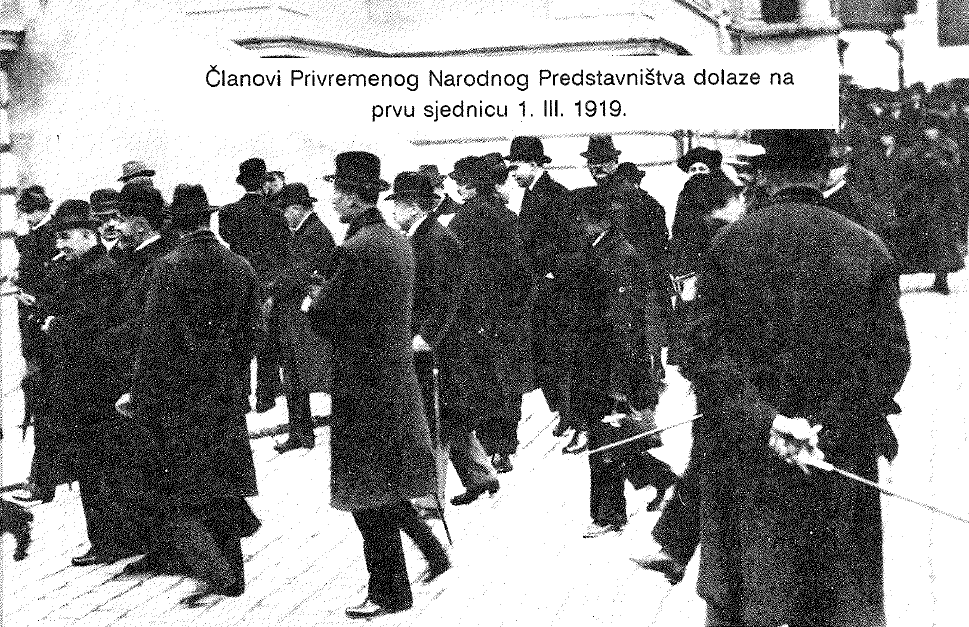
Temporary National Representation members arriving to the inaugural sitting on 1 March 1919.

The interim parliament was expected to convene within a month of the government's inauguration. The interim parliament was formally established as the Temporary National Representation (Privremeno narodno predstavništvo, PNP) by Regent Alexander's decree of 24 February 1919. It convened for the first time in Belgrade on 1 March. The proceedings were opened by an address of Regent Alexander. According to the historian Ivo Banac, the delay was intended to ensure that the government was free to implement decisions designed to centralise the country without interference from the parliament. The government contested the PNP's right to enact any legislation, except on the procedure of election of the Constituent Assembly and determination of its agenda.

The PNP was composed generally of people who had served on a legislative or consultative body. Most of its 294 members were appointed. Regional assemblies appointed 84 representatives of the territory of Serbia before the 1912–1913 Balkan Wars expansion, 24 representatives of Vojvodina, and 12 representatives of Montenegro. A further 24 representatives of South Serbia province (generally corresponding to territories of present-day Kosovo and North Macedonia) were elected. The election was undemocratic because it only included voters approved by the authorities and used open ballots. The National Council of Slovenes, Croats and Serbs did not take up the task of selecting its representatives. Instead, the Slovenian politician Albert Kramer drew up a list of representatives for appointment on the authority of Regent Alexander. The representatives of former Austro-Hungarian lands (except Vojvodina) were formally appointed by special committees and their mandates confirmed by the National Council of Slovenes, Croats and Serbs in Zagreb, and equivalent bodies established in Split and Sarajevo for Dalmatia and for Bosnia and Herzegovina, respectively. Slovenia was granted 32 delegates to the PNP, Croatia-Slavonia (jointly with the city of Rijeka and the region of Međimurje) had 60, Istria had 4, Dalmatia had 12, and Bosnia and Herzegovina had 32.

Political parties were allotted seats in proportion to their strength in regional parliaments or diets. Consequently, the HPSS was assigned two seats in the PNP, which the party refused, and the Communist Party of Yugoslavia (only established in April 1919) was unrepresented. The DS and the NRS held 115 and 69 seats respectively, ensuring majority support for the Protić cabinet. The following leadership of the PNP was appointed: Dragoljub Pavlović, president; Ivan Ribar and Franc Jankovič, vice-presidents; Petar Jovanović, Joca Manojlović, Aleksandar Mijović, Josif Bojinović, Ivan Krnic, Pavel Pestotnik, and Dragotin Lončar, secretaries. Pavlović died in April 1920, and Stanojlo Vukčević was elected to replace him as the president. At the same time, Adolf Ribnikar was elected a vice-president, and Kerubin Šegvić a secretary.

== Political currents ==
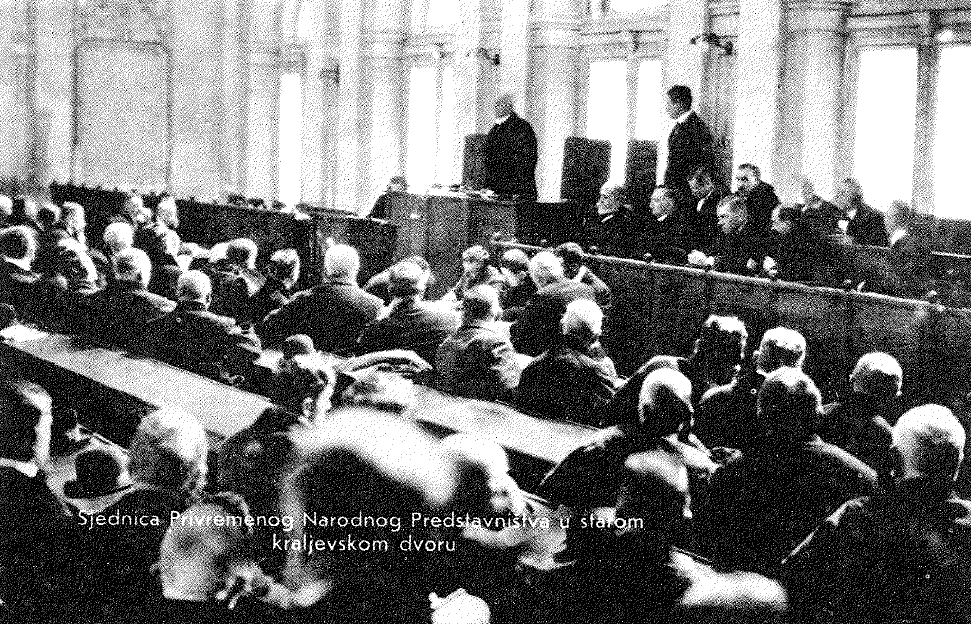
A sitting of the Temporary National Representation at Stari dvor, Belgrade.

There were four principal currents in the PNP regarding the constitution. The DS wanted centralised government. The NRS also advocated centralisation but, unlike the DS, thought that Serbs, Croats, and Slovenes should be allowed to continue to develop their national and cultural identities separately. Approaches of the DS and the NRS to the centralised government system differed. Namely, the DS, specifically Pribićević, advocated a higher level of centralisation where ethnic and regional diversity were to be suppressed. Pribićević's views on the system of government were endorsed by Regent Alexander. One interpretation of the NRS's position was given by Protić in his proposal for the country's new constitution. That proposal envisaged a level of self-government for historical regions, preservation of the region's specific identities and their representation in the national assembly. The Republican Party advocated a decentralised republic, while the Slovene People's Party (SLS), Croatian Peoples' Peasant Party (HPSS), Croatian Union (HZ) and Montenegrin federalists advocated a federation (union of self-governing states) or a confederation (union of sovereign states).

The DS and the NRS came into conflict by summer of 1919. While continuing to oppose federalist ideas, the NRS aimed to strengthen its position in the PNP through alliances with the HZ and the SLS – the strongest Croatian and Slovene political parties in 1918 – by moderating its views of centralisation and accusing the DS of extremist views.

The conflict led to the collapse of the Protić government and appointment of Davidović as prime minister. Davidović formed a 126-seat minority government with the Social Democratic Party led by Vitomir Korać. Davidović imposed a two-month recess on the PNP while lobbying to expand parliamentary support. In September 1919, the DS proposed that Regent Alexander dissolve the PNP and call an election, but the regent declined and the government resigned.

Davidović's cabinet was replaced by another minority government. It was led by Protić and the NRS in the Parliamentary Union coalition with the HZ and the SLS. The coalition began reversing repressive measures previously introduced against the HPSS and drafted a compromise proposed constitution. It quickly collapsed, unable to secure majority support in the PNP. The lack of support resulted from rumours spread by the DS claiming that the Croatian Committee and foreign powers were colluding against the country, and a wave of strikes led by the communists.

Regent Alexander then appointed Milenko Radomar Vesnić (NRS) as prime minister, tasking him with forming a government with the DS. The NRS brought its position on centralisation closer to the DS, while the DS compromised on issues of land reform. The Vesnić cabinet proposed and the PNP passed the regulation on election of the Constitutional Assembly. The legislation restricted the Constitutional Assembly deliberations to two years and implicitly gave the king (or the regent) the right to dissolve the Assembly.

== Legislative work and dissolution ==
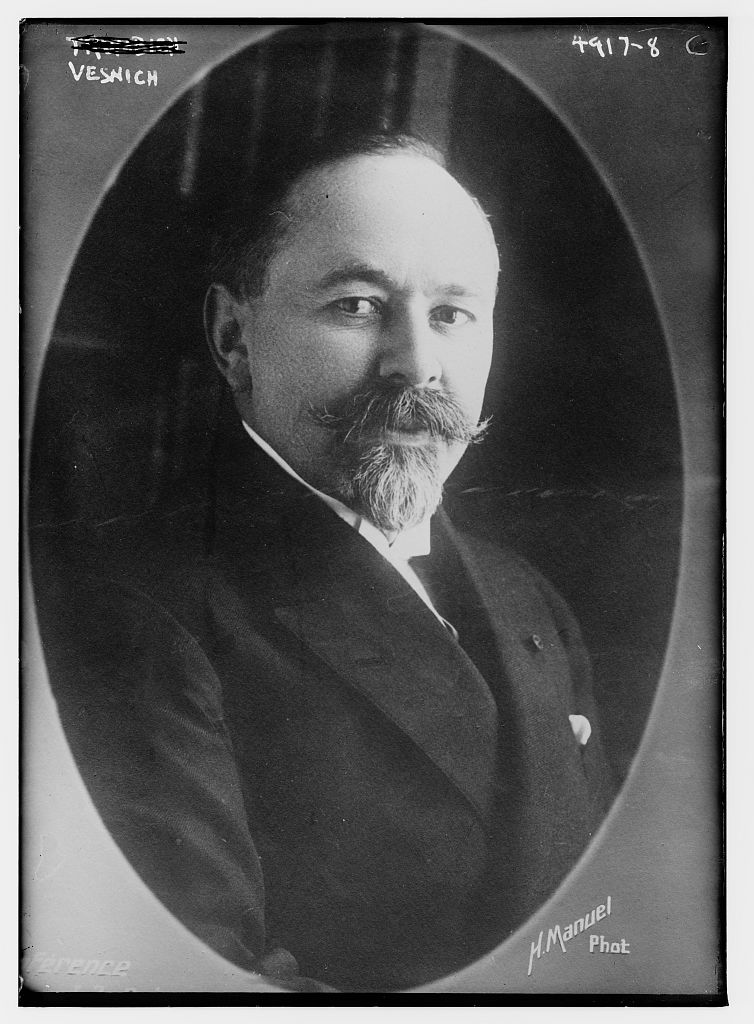
The Temporary National Representation passed the election law proposed by the government of Milenko Radomar Vesnić (pictured).

The PNP considered 47 legislative measures but failed to enact 35 of them. According to the historian John R. Lampe, the failure is attributable to Pribićević's divisive actions as interior minister. The PNP worked in the circumstances where Pribićević, in his role of a government minister, was issuing administrative regulations, dismissing and hiring officials. The arbitrariness of his actions led to conflicts between the DS and the NRS as well as within Pribićević's own party. Pribićević's actions caused significant dissatisfaction in Croatia. While the HPSS led by Stjepan Radić, as a rising political power in Croatia, boycotted the work of the PNP, Protić felt he could come to an agreement with Radić. Conversely, Pribićević opposed any arrangement and repeatedly urged Protić to deploy the army to Croatia to quell government opposition. Protić's inability to come to an agreement with both Radić and Pribićević left the government without support of majority of the PNP members. Even though he made a promise not to rule without consent of the provisional legislative, Protić resorted to ruling by issuing government decrees.

The PNP held 137 sittings, enacting the following acts: Calendar Alignment Act; Suspension and Enforcement Limits Act; Ljubljana University Act; University Act; Legal and Notarial Practice Rights Settlements Act; National Schools Act; Jury Act; Moratorium Act; Spas, Mineral and Hot Water Act; Citizenship Act; Act on the Peace Treaty Between the Allied Powers and Germany; Act on the Peace Treaty Between the Allied Powers and Bulgaria; and the Constitutional Assembly Members Election Act, which was enacted on 3 September 1920.

The Constitutional Assembly was elected on 28 November 1920 and thus the PNP's mandate ended. The PNP never enacted the Constitutional Assembly's rules of order. This was achieved by a government decree after the elections. Most significantly, the rules of order ignored the demand by the National Council of Slovenes, Croats and Serbs that the constitution be adopted by two-thirds majority. Instead, the rules of order required only a simple majority for the task. The Corfu Declaration had called for a qualified majority, but the rules of order required absolute majority of all members sworn. The government argued that going beyond the majority of all members present and voting was sufficient to count as a qualified majority in the spirit of the Corfu Declaration.

== Sources ==
- Banac, Ivo (1984). The National Question in Yugoslavia: Origins, History, Politics. Ithaca, New York: Cornell University Press. ISBN 0-8014-1675-2.
- Crnobrnja, Mihailo (1996). The Yugoslav Drama. Montreal: McGill–Queen's University Press. ISBN 9780773514294.
- Dragnich, Alex N. (1983). The First Yugoslavia: Search for a Viable Political System. Stanford: Hoover Institution Press. ISBN 9780817978419.
- Lampe, John R. (2000). Yugoslavia as History: Twice There Was a Country (2nd ed.). Cambridge: Cambridge University Press. ISBN 0-521-77357-1.
- Matijević, Zlatko (2008). "Narodno vijeće Slovenaca, Hrvata i Srba u Zagrebu: Osnutak, djelovanje i nestanak (1918/1919)" [National Council of Slovenes, Croats and Serbs: Establishment, Activities and Disappearance (1918/1919)]. Fontes: Izvori Za Hrvatsku Povijest (in Croatian). 14 (1). Zagreb: Croatian State Archives: 35–66. ISSN 1330-6804.
- Mitrinović, Čedomil; Brašić, Miloš N. (1937). Jugoslovenske narodne skupštine i sabori [Yugoslav National Assemblies and Diets] (in Serbian and French). Belgrade: National Assembly of the Kingdom of Yugoslavia. OCLC 11391185.
- Ramet, Sabrina P. (2006). The Three Yugoslavias: State-Building and Legitimation, 1918–2005. Bloomington: Indiana University Press. ISBN 978-0-253-34656-8.
