= Većeslav Wilder =

Croatian and Yugoslavian politician (1878–1961)

- Born: 8 August 1878; Litomyšl, Bohemia, Austria-Hungary
- Died: 2 December 1961 (aged 83); London, United Kingdom
- Education: Charles University
- Occupation: Politician
- Political party: Croatian People's Progressive Party; Croat-Serb Coalition; Democratic Party

Većeslav Wilder, also spelled Većeslav Vilder (8 August 1878 – 2 December 1961), was a Croatian and Yugoslavian politician.

Wilder studied law and graduated from the Charles University in Prague in 1901. He took part in establishment of the Croatian People's Progressive Party in 1904 and influenced its accession to the Croat-Serb Coalition. Wilder was the editor of the party's newspaper Pokret. He was elected a member of the Croatian Sabor in the 1913 Croatian parliamentary election and was subsequently appointed a Croatian representative at the Diet of Hungary. After the World War I and establishment of the Kingdom of Serbs, Croats and Slovenes (subsequently renamed Kingdom of Yugoslavia), Wilder joined the Democratic Party and its Main Committee as a close associate of Svetozar Pribičević. Following 1927, he became a political ally of the Croatian Peasant Party leadership within the framework of the Peasant-Democratic Coalition. Wilder was among signatories of 1932 Zagreb Points resolution condemning Serbian hegemony within the Yugoslavia. After the outbreak of the World War II and Invasion of Yugoslavia, Wilder left the country and settled in London. In the United Kingdom, Wilder provided commentary for BBC Radio condemning Ustaše-led puppet state of the Independent State of Croatia as well as accusing Archbishop of Zagreb Alojzije Stepinac of collaborating with the Axis powers.
