= Croatian Sports Association =

Sports organization in Croatia

Croatian Sports Association (Croatian: Hrvatski športski savez) was founded on October 5, 1909 (according to some sources on October 8, 1909) in Zagreb at the in a "Grič" as the central sports organization that coordinated the work of clubs in various sports branches. The goal of the CCA was to avoid the Croatian clubs joining the Hungarian or Austrian federation, and to participate independently in the international sports field.

== Beginning ==
Without sports competitions, clubs could not prosper or survive, and the further progress of Croatian sport depended on the establishment of a single federation of all sports branches. The first initiative for the establishment of the Alliance was given by Mario Rieger Vinodolski, a well-known sports journalist and employee, and the secretary of the PNIŠK in the weekly "Croatian Sports Journal" from June 1, 1908. The invitation to the meeting was published on September 1, 1908. At the meeting at the inn "Three ravens" on September 18, 1908, due to the presence of too few club representatives and the lack of representatives of one of the strongest sports organization of the Croatian Academy of Sciences and Arts, the Association was not successful. During 1909, the Croatian Academy of Sciences and Arts needed the existence of the Alliance because it had difficulty arranging football matches with clubs from the Austrian and Hungarian federations, and finally, on October 5, 1909, the Croatian Sports Federation was established.

== First board and members ==
The founding assembly of the Alliance was attended by members of the Croatian Academy of Sciences and Arts, the 1st Croatian Fencing Club, the 1st Croatian Skating Society, the 1st Croatian Automobile Club, the 1st Croatian Cycling Club, the Zagreb Eagle Reel Club and the Academia Croatian Sports Club. The first president was elected prof. Ljudevit Andrassy and Secretary Milovan Zoricic. Due to political turmoil in the then Austro-Hungarian monarchy, the approval of the work and rules of the CCS came to pass on August 10, 1910. In 1912 new members became the Sloga Kotor Society of Varaždin, the Neptun Rowing Club of Osijek, the Zvijezda Kotor Club of Karlovac, and the Croatian Mountaineering Society, the Sokol Kotor Society, the Concordia Sports Club, the Croatian Typographic Sports Club Zagreb and the First Croatian Civic Sports Club, all from Zagreb. In 1913 the Illyrian Sports Club from Ljubljana joined the Alliance. HSC Hajduk from Split and Croatian Rowing Club Jadran from Zadar have been members since 1914.

== Regular assemblies and activities ==
- March 30, 1911, First Regular General Assembly: A new board of directors was elected to advocate for the inclusion of other sports branches in the CCS.
- June 13, 1912, Second Regular General Assembly: Regulations and Appointed Referees for Football, Motorcycling, Cycling, Athletics, Fencing, Swimming, Hand Riding, Skiing, Skating and Tennis were accepted.
- February 8, 1913, Third Regular General Assembly: The president of the new board became Franjo Bucar, new sports organizations were founded, the number of members increased, and the Croatian public was following championship competitions.
- February 13, 1914, Fourth Regular General Assembly: The formation of a rowing section was announced and clubs from Dalmatia were joining the federation.
- July 27, 1914: Due to the outbreak of World War I, the CCS was banned.
- November 8, 1914: The first charity event in Maksimir (football match: Civic – Victoria) and the CCS continues its work under the name of humanitarian organizations.
- 1915: 23 football games played.
- May 19, 1918: Zagreb's first football championship begins.
- August 1, 1918: The Provincial Government officially approves the work of the CCS in Zagreb, and sports competitions begin.
- September 16, 1919: At the CCS session, it was decided that an Olympic Committee for the Kingdom of SHS should be established.
- December 14, 1919: Upon the initiative of the CCS, the Yugoslav Olympic Committee was established, and all sections of the CCS extend their scope to the entire territory of the Kingdom of the SCS, ie proclaim themselves Yugoslav federations for certain sports.
