= Dragoljub "Draža" Pavlović =

Serbian politician (1867–1920)

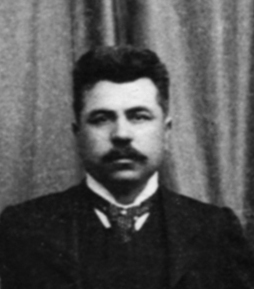
Image of Dragoljub Pavlović

Dragoljub "Draža" Pavlović (Knjaževac, 16 June 1867 - Belgrade, 3 April 1920) was a Serbian politician, historian, doctor of philosophy, professor and academic. He was a member of the People's Radical Party and the first president of the Provisional People's Representation of the Kingdom of Serbs, Croats and Slovenes.

== Biography ==
He was born on June 16, 1867, in Knjaževac. He attended primary and lower grammar schools in his hometown and high school in Niš. He graduated from the historical-philological department of the Faculty of Philosophy of the Velika škola in Belgrade. He worked as a professor trainee, deputy, in Zaječar and for a while, he stayed as a state cadet in Vienna. He then worked as a professor at a teacher's school in Belgrade and studied in Germany, where he defended his doctorate in philosophy.

Upon his return to Serbia, he became a professor at a teacher's school in Knjaževac, and then a professor at the Third Belgrade Gymnasium. His next job in 1893 was the Department of History at the Great School in Belgrade. He became one of the first eight full professors at the University of Belgrade in 1905.

Dragoljub Draža Pavlović was elected a corresponding member of the Serbian Royal Academy of Social Sciences on 4 February 1905, while he became a full member on 16 February 1920.

He was a member of the People's Radical Party and the first president of the Provisional People's Representation in 1920 and as such the first president of the Parliament of Yugoslavia.

He died in Belgrade of a heart attack on 3 April 1920. He was buried very solemnly on 5 April, with all the honours befitting the position he held and the merits of his work.

== Literary works ==
Dragoljub Pavlović was the initiator and editor of the newspaper Timočanin and the political-literary magazine Dela, in which he published several of his works. The others were published in special publications, or in the editions of the Serbian Royal Academy of Sciences.

His most important works are:

- In the Eyes of the Revolution of 1848
- The Unification of the German People
- The Administration and Church Policy of Austria in Northern Serbia from 1717-1739
- The Peace of Požarevac
- Kočina Krajina
- Culture and Wars
