= Ivan Lorković =

Croatian politician (1876–1926)

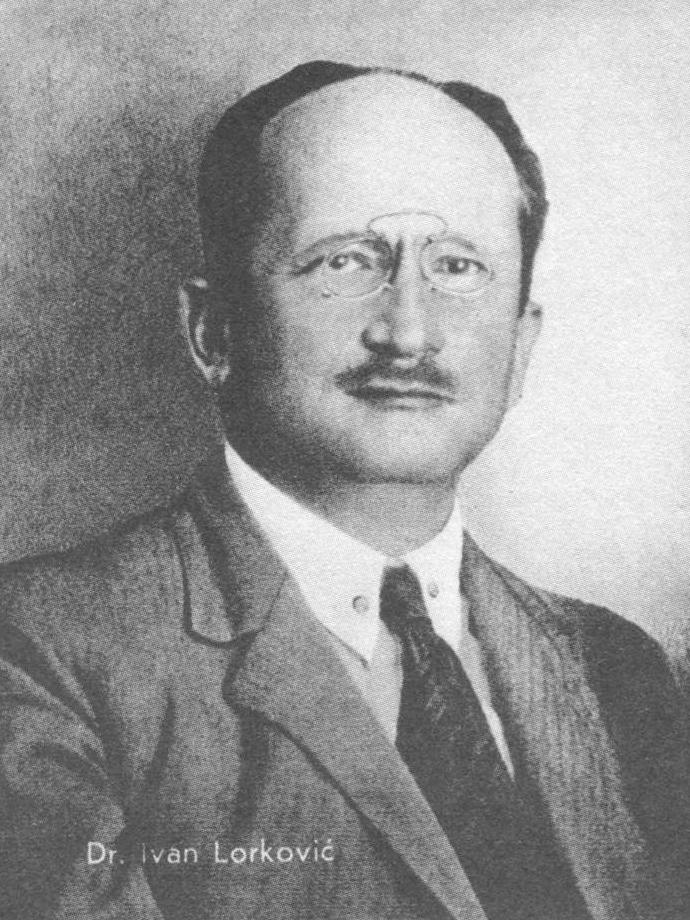
- Lorković, 1920s
- Born: 17 June 1876; Zagreb, Croatia-Slavonia, Austria-Hungary
- Died: 24 February 1926 (aged 49); Zagreb, Kingdom of Serbs, Croats and Slovenes
- Occupation: Politician
- Political party: Croatian Union (1919–1926)
- Father: Blaž Lorković

Ivan Lorković (Croatian: [ǐʋan lǒːrkoʋit͡ɕ]; 17 June 1876 – 24 February 1926) was a Croatian politician and political newspaper editor from Zagreb.

== Political biography ==
=== Early life and graduate years: 1876-1901 ===
Lorković was born in Zagreb to Blaž Lorković, an economist and lawyer. He completed his secondary education at the Classical Gymnasium in Zagreb in 1894, then attended the Faculty of Law at the University of Zagreb, where he undertook a doctorate in law. At this time, students of the faculty undertook strict examinations ("rigorozas") to attain the title of Doctor of Law, qualifying them to work in the judiciary.

During his time at the university, Lorković participated in the burning of a Hungarian flag. He also joined the Union of Croatian and Serbian Academic Youth. This was a coalition of students at the universities of Zagreb, Prague and Vienna who favoured greater co-operation between Croats and Serbs. The Zagreb arm of the coalition published a manifesto, National Thought ("Narodna Misao") in 1897. Lorković, alongside Svetozar Pribićević, was a contributor.

Lorković completed some of his study in Prague before graduating in 1899. For the next three years, he worked outside politics as a legal trainee, court reporter, and a court bailiff in Klanjec.

=== Entering politics: 1902-1905 ===
In 1902, he moved to Osijek to become the first editor-in-chief of newspaper National Defense (Croatian: Narodna odbrana). This newspaper, funded by Croatian-speaking merchants and business owners in Osijek, was the first to be published in the Croatian language in Osijek in 24 years. It promoted Croatian identity in a region that was influenced by German and Hungarian culture at the time. The printing house that was established to publish National Defense was one of only a few printing outfits in history known to be set up as a joint-stock company for the sole purpose of furthering a political aim. Lorković used his position to further his cause for Croatian economic autonomy.

Lorković stepped down from the newspaper to co-found the Croatian National Progressive Party with former Progressive Youth figures in December 1905. This party supported the New Course Policy and joined the Croat-Serb Coalition that won a majority in the 1906 Croatian parliamentary election; thus, Lorković became a member of parliament ("Sabor"). He also served as editor of the Croat-Serb Coalition's newspaper Pokret.

=== Political leadership: 1906-1926 ===
Lorković was elected to represented Valpovo, a district not far from Osijek; he would be re-elected by the constituency in several elections. Throughout his time as an elected official, Lorković would be a proponent of anti-clericalism.

When the Croat-Serb Coalition's leader, Frano Supilo, stepped down in 1910, Lorković became its main Croatian representative. In this role, Lorković continued to advocate for co-operation between Croats and Serbs. However, he conflicted ideologically with the Serb representative, Svetozar Pribićević, an adherent of Yugoslavism and proponent of a united Croat-Serb state with a centralized government. Lorković feared that Croat interests would become subordinate to Serb interests under this system, and favoured federalism. Lorković, a reserved intellectual, struggled to moderate Pribićević's bolder leadership style.

In 1914, Lorković met with Tomáš G. Masaryk in Rome, presenting a memorandum outlining a vision for breaking up the Austrian empire while preserving some form of Croatian statehood. Masaryk was skeptical of Lorković's belief that France and the United Kingdom would accept a total dissolution of Austria-Hungary, and therefore did not endorse it. Undeterred, Lorković would go on to participate in the Yugoslav Committee beginning in 1915, an organization that lobbied throughout the First World War for the creation of a common state of South Slavs in Serbia, Montenegro and Austria-Hungary.

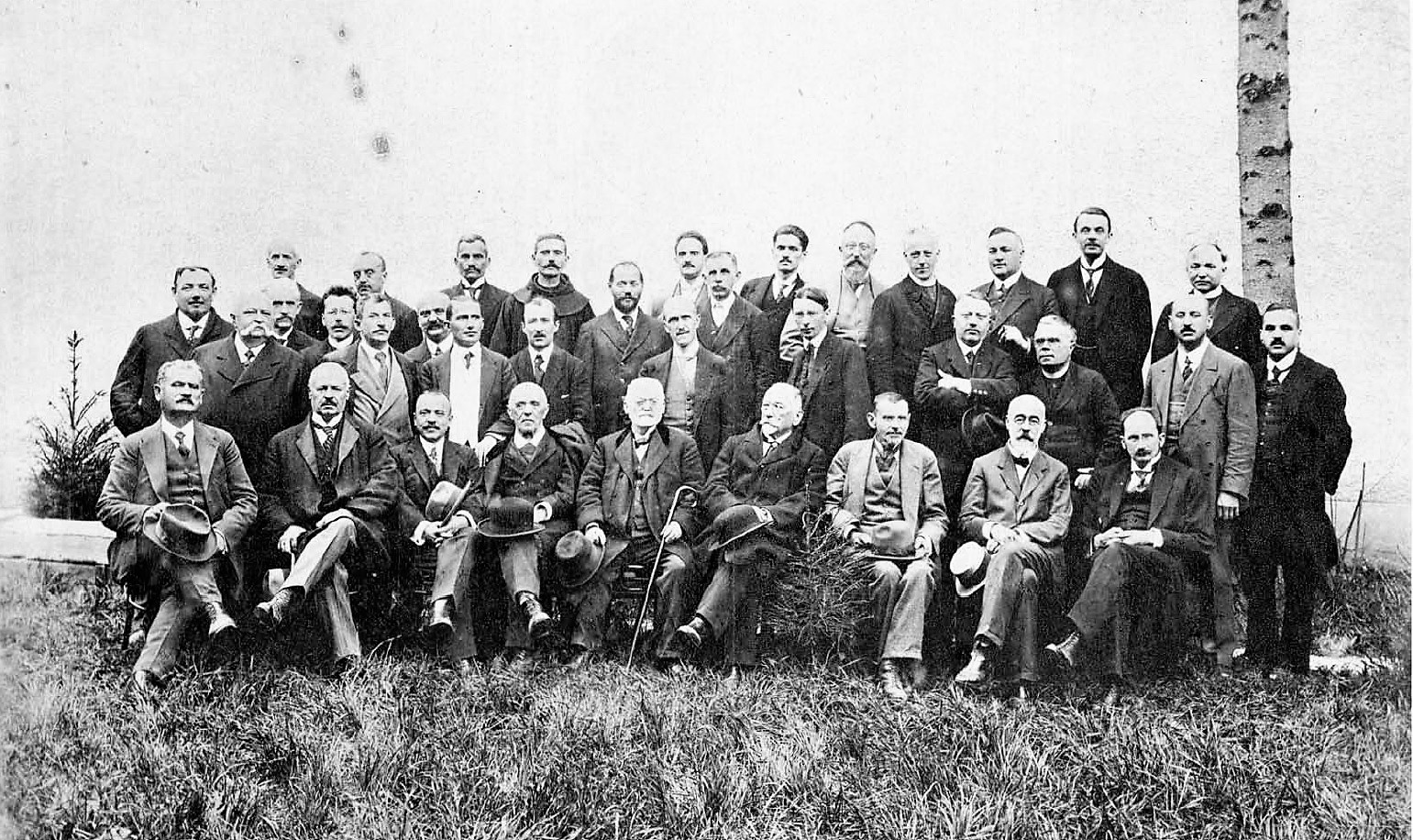
Lorković, seated at the far right, with members of the State Council in November 1918

By 1917, Lorković could no longer reconcile his ideological differences with Pribićević, and withdrew from the Croat-Serb Coalition in 1917. That same year, the Yugoslav Committee's efforts led to the Corfu Declaration in 1917, a pledge to create the Kingdom of Serbs, Croats, and Slovenes once the Great War ended.

Although this meant the introduction of the kind of central government Lorković had long opposed, Lorković participated in negotiations around unification, to continue advocating for political protections for Croats, including financial autonomy within the Kingdom. He was ultimately unsuccessful. When the Kingdom was established in 1918, the separate currency that had been used by Croatians was absorbed into the new currency, with a conversion rate that favoured the dinar previously used in the regions comprising Serbia.

Lorković continued to favour the concept of a federalist Serb-Croat state, and joined the Croatian Committee of likeminded politicians. He was also a critic of monarchism and envisioned this state functioning as a liberal democracy. In 1919, he founded the Croatian Union political party to formally pursue these goals. His continued resistance to centralism led him to ally with Stjepan Radić, a fellow proponent of republicanism, in January 1922, introducing his party into the Croatian Bloc (Croatian: Hrvatski blok). The Bloc was dominated by Radić's Croatian Peasant Party.

In the 1925 elections, held in February, Lorković was elected to represent Split on the Croatian Peasant Party's ticket. However, he was growing disillusioned with Radić's leadership, which he perceived as being quick to compromise. After Radić briefly allied with the People's Radical Party in July, Lorković protested publicly, with the support of Ante Trumbić.

Dissidents from Radić's Croatian Peasant Party attended a September conference of Lorković's Croatian Union party in Split, leading to the founding of the Croatian People's Federalist Union. The next year, this coalition became the Croatian Federalist Peasant Party, founded in Zagreb, with Lorković its president. Radić was assassinated in 1928, and Lorković's party began to support the opposition Peasant-Democratic Coalition. On 20 January 1929, the party was formally banned by the 6 January Dictatorship.

Lorković died shortly afterwards in Zagreb on 24 February 1926. In a contemporary obituary, Robert Seton-Watson opined that he had been "one of the most... unselfish" political figures in his era of Croatian politics.

== Personal life ==
In 1899, Lorković married Valerija "Lera" Krištof, the daughter of a prominent Slovenian veterinarian. Krištof was a keen philanthropist who was interested in sport, an interest she shared with her husband.

Lorković and Krištof had six children. Among them, their youngest child Mladen became an Ustaša minister in the fascist Independent State of Croatia, and a Nazi-collaborationist involved in the Lorković–Vokić plot. Their eldest son Zdravko became an entomologist known for his work in cytotaxonomy on butterfly chromosomes. Their only daughter, Vlasta, was a pianist who worked for a time as a music teacher at the Zagreb Music Academy. Vlasta married Šimun Debelić and was a friend of pianist Melita Lorković (no relation).

A passionate mountaineer, Lorković also participated in the Croatian Sports Association, an organization that aimed to establish independent Croatian representation in international sporting events. He was commemorated for this work in 2023 by the Croatian Olympic Committee.

In 1913, Lorković became the godfather of Vane Ivanović, son of Ivan Rikard Ivanović. Ivan was one of Lorković's parliamentary colleagues and fellow member of the Croat-Serb Coalition.

== Bibliography ==
- Banac, Ivo, The National Question in Yugoslavia: Origins, History, Politics, Ithaca: Cornell University Press (1984), p. 172
- Antić, Ljubomir (October 1982). "Hrvatska federalistička seljačka stranka". Journal – Institute of Croatian History (in Croatian). 15 (1). Faculty of Philosophy, Zagreb, FF press: 136–222. ISSN 0353-295X.

Party political offices
Preceded by Established	Leader of the Croatian Federalist Peasant Party; 1926 – 1929	Succeeded by Ante Trumbić
