= Ante Trumbić =

Croatian politician

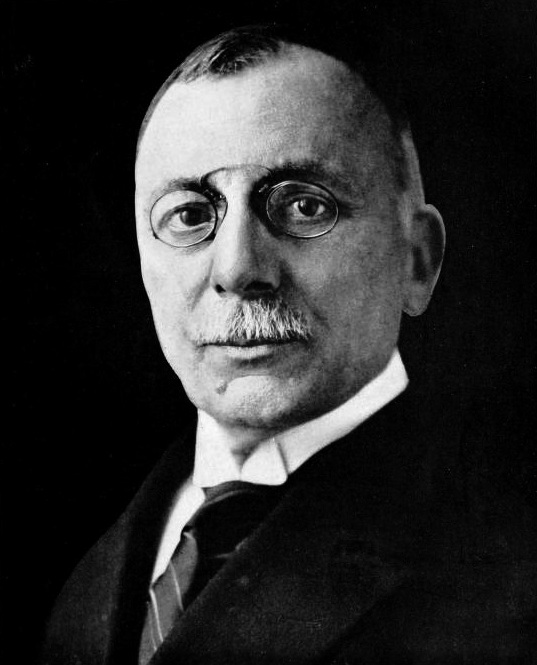

Foreign Minister of Yugoslavia
- In office 7 December 1918 – 22 November 1920
- Preceded by: Stojan Protić
- Succeeded by: Milenko Vesnić

Mayor of Split
- In office 1906–1907
- Preceded by: Vinko Milić
- Succeeded by: Vicko Mihaljević

Personal details
- Born: 17 May 1864 Split, Dalmatia, Austrian Empire
- Died: 17 November 1938 (aged 74) Zagreb, Kingdom of Yugoslavia
- Party: Party of Rights (–1905); Croatian Party (1905–1918); Croatian Community (1924–1926); Croatian Peasant Party (1926–1938)
- Education: University of Zagreb; University of Vienna
- Occupation: Politician
- Profession: Attorney at law

Ante Trumbić (17 May 1864 – 17 November 1938) was a Yugoslav and Croatian lawyer and politician in the early 20th century.

== Biography ==
Trumbić was born in Split in the Austrian crownland of Dalmatia and studied law at Zagreb, Vienna and Graz (with doctorate in 1890). He practiced as a lawyer, and then, from 1905 as the city mayor of Split. Trumbić was in favor of moderate reforms in Austro-Hungarian Slavic provinces. That included the unification of Dalmatia with Croatia-Slavonia demanded by the New Course Policy Trumbić helped draw up.

After the assassination in Sarajevo of Archduke Franz Ferdinand and the invasion of Serbia by Austria-Hungary, Trumbić became the prominent Yugoslav nationalist leader during World War I, and led the Yugoslav Committee that lobbied the Allies to support the creation of an independent Yugoslavia. Trumbić negotiated with Serbian Prime Minister Nikola Pašić to have the Kingdom of Serbia support the creation of a Yugoslav state, which was delivered at the Corfu Declaration on 20 July 1917 that advocated the creation of a united state of Serbs, Croats and Slovenes that would be led by the Serbian House of Karađorđević. Trumbić led the Yugoslav Committee delegation at the conference in 1918 that produced the Geneva Declaration.

In 1918, he became foreign minister in the first government of the Kingdom of Serbs, Croats and Slovenes. At the Versailles conference after World War I, Trumbić had to represent Yugoslav concerns in the face of Italian territorial ambitions in Dalmatia (temporarily settled in 1920, but raised again with Benito Mussolini).

In spite of his support for a united Yugoslavia, Trumbić opposed the 1921 constitution over his belief that it was too centralized and allowed Serb hegemony over Yugoslavia. Trumbić was one of 35 representatives to vote against the constitution amid a wide boycott of the National Assembly by opposition parties. Trumbić grew steadily disillusioned with the Yugoslav government over time which he saw as Serb-dominated. He was elected for the last time in the 1927 elections on the list of the Croatian Bloc representing Zagreb together with Ante Pavelić.

In 1929, claiming to bring an end to the ongoing bickering between the Serbian and the Croatian representatives within the kingdom, King Alexander of Yugoslavia staged a coup d'état and banned all political parties, and removed the individual nationalities Serb and Croat from the bigger picture. He renamed the land Yugoslavia, and abrogated the constitution to establish a royal dictatorship, the so-called January 6th Dictatorship. Trumbić was by now in retirement in Zagreb. King Alexander's division of Croatia-Slavonia and Dalmatia into oblasts and then into banovinas, countered all previous reforms Trumbić had sought. In a September 1932 interview with The Manchester Guardian Trumbić wondered whether Croatia should separate from the Kingdom of Yugoslavia and pursue a union with Austria. In November 1932 Trumbić edited the Zagreb Points, a series of demands put forth by the Peasant-Democratic coalition to counter Serbian hegemony.

With the arrest of Croatian Peasant Party leader Vladko Maček in April 1933, Trumbić and Josip Predavec became caretaker co-leaders of the party. After Predavec's assassination on 14 July, Trumbić acted as party head in Maček's absence.

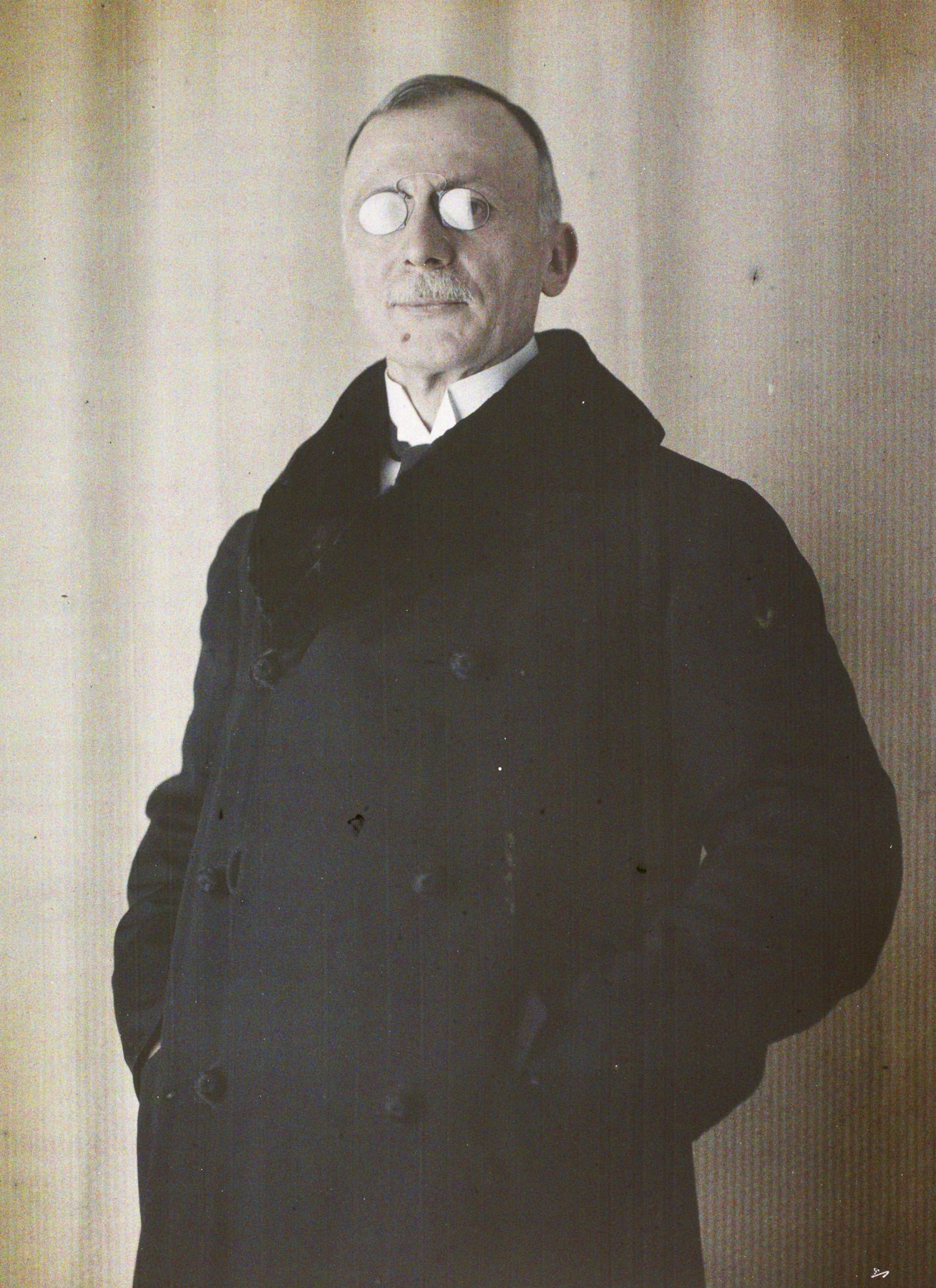
Autochrome by Auguste Léon, 1919

According to Henri Pozzi, Trumbić later regretted the end of Austria-Hungary, as the South Slav state he had helped to create proved incapable of his intended reforms.

Political offices
Preceded by Vinko Milić	Mayor of Split; 1906–1907	Succeeded by Vicko Mihaljević
Preceded by Stojan Protić	Minister of Foreign Affairs of the Kingdom of Serbs, Croats and Slovenes; 1918–1920	Succeeded by Milenko Vesnić
Party political offices
Preceded by Ivan Lorković	Leader of the Croatian Federalist Peasant Party; 1926–1929	Succeeded by none
