= Alex N. Dragnich =

Serbian-American political scientist

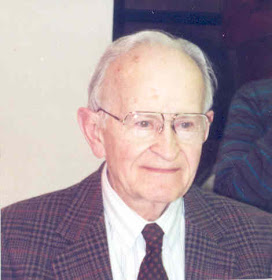
Photo of Alex N. Dragnich

Alex N. Dragnich (22 February 1912 – 10 August 2009) was a Serbian-American political scientist and the author of several works on the Balkans.

== Biography ==
Born on 22 February 1912, he was the son of Serbian immigrants from Montenegro, who had a homestead in Ferry County in the State of Washington. In his youth, he attended elementary and high school there and worked on his parents' farm during the Great Depression. Upon graduation from high school, he enrolled at the University of Washington in Seattle in 1934 and graduated Phi Beta Kappa in 1938. He then went on to obtain his master's degree in 1940. For the next two years, he did graduate work at the University of California at Berkeley where he obtained his doctorate in 1942 but wartime service delayed his Ph.D. until 1945.

During the Second World War Dragnich served as a foreign affairs analyst for the Department of Justice and the Office of Strategic Services. From 1947 to 1950 he joined the U.S. Foreign Service and served as Public Affairs Officer at the U.S. Embassy in Belgrade. It was during his service in communist Yugoslavia that Dragnich first found out about the Tito-Stalin split of 1948.

In 1950 he became was a professor at Vanderbilt University in Nashville, Tennessee, where he spent more than a quarter century before taking his retirement. He carried out various studies on the Balkans, including critical works on characters and personages such as Josip Broz Tito and Nikola Pašić.

== Work ==
- Tito's Promised Land (Rutgers University Press, 1954).
- Major European governments (Dorsey Press, 1961).
- Serbia, Nikola Pašić, and Yugoslavia (Rutgers University Press, 1974).
- The Development of Parliamentary Government in Serbia (Columbia University Press, 1978).
- The First Yugoslavia: Search for a Viable Political System (Hoover Institution Press, 1983).
- The Saga of Kosovo: Focus on Serbian-Albanian Relations (Columbia University Press, 1984), junto a Slavko Todorovich.
- Serbs and Croats: The Struggle in Yugoslavia (Harcourt Brace Jovanovich, 1992).

== See also ==
- List of Serbian Americans

== Bibliography ==
- Dragnich, Alex N. (1961). Major European governments. Dorsey series in political science. Homewood, Illinois: Dorsey Press.
- Despalatović, Elinor M. (1984). "Alex N. Dragnich. The First Yugoslavia: Search for a Viable Political System. (Hoover Press Publication, number 284.) Stanford: Hoover Institution Press. 1983. Pp. 182. $24.95". The American Historical Review. 89 (2). American Historical Association: 480–481. doi:10.1086/ahr/89.2.480-a. ISSN 1937-5239.
- Helmreich, Ernst C. (1987). "Alex N. Dragnich and Slavko Todorovich. The Saga of Kosovo: Focus on Serbian-Albanian Relations. Boulder, Colo.: East European Monographs, 1984. vi, 203 pp. $22.50. Distributed by Columbia University Press". Canadian-American Slavic Studies. 21 (2): 187. doi:10.1163/221023987X00619. ISSN 2210-2396.
- Korbel, Josef (February 1956). "Tito's Promised Land. by Alex N. Dragnich". The Journal of Politics. 18 (1). The University of Chicago Press / Southern Political Science Association: 125–127. doi:10.2307/2126688. ISSN 1468-2508. JSTOR 2126688.
- Legvold, Robert (1993). "Serbs and Croats: The Struggle in Yugoslavia by Alex N. Dragnich". Foreign Affairs. 72 (3). Council on Foreign Relations: 207. doi:10.2307/20045673. ISSN 0015-7120. JSTOR 20045673.
- Mayda, Jaro (April 1956). "Tito's Promised Land: Yugoslavia. by Alex N. Dragnich". American Slavic and East European Review. 15 (2): 288–290. doi:10.2307/3000989. ISSN 1049-7544. JSTOR 3000989.
- Pavlowitch, St. K. (October 1975). "Serbia, Nikola Pašić, and Yugoslavia by Alex N. Dragnich". The Slavonic and East European Review. 53 (133). Modern Humanities Research Association / University College London, School of Slavonic and East European Studies: 625–627. ISSN 2222-4327. JSTOR 4207181.
- Prifti, Peter R. (1986). "The Saga of Kosovo: Focus on Serbian-Albanian Relations. by Alex N. Dragnich, Slavko Todorovich". Slavic Review. 45 (2). Association for Slavic, East European, and Eurasian Studies: 391. doi:10.2307/2499265. ISSN 0037-6779. JSTOR 2499265. S2CID 164761100.
- Rosenblum-Kale, Karen (December 1983). "The First Yugoslavia: Search for a Viable Political System. By Alex N. Dragnich. (Stanford, Calif.: Hoover Institution Press, 1983. Pp. xii + 175. $24.95.)". American Political Science Review. 78 (3). American Political Science Association: 827–828. doi:10.2307/1961883. ISSN 1537-5943. JSTOR 1961883. S2CID 148194794.
- Stoianovich, Traian (September 1979). "The Development of Parliamentary Government in Serbia by Alex N. Dragnich". Canadian Slavonic Papers / Revue Canadienne des Slavistes. 21 (3). Taylor & Francis, Ltd.: 425–426. ISSN 2375-2475. JSTOR 40867623.
- Wolfe, Henry C. (17 July 1954). "Red Apostate. Tito's Promised Land: Yugoslavia, by Alex N. Dragnich". Saturday Review: 21. ISSN 0036-4983.
