= Sabrina P. Ramet =

American political scientist

Sabrina Petra Ramet
- Born: 26 June 1949 (age 77); London, England
- Citizenship: United States (since 1966)
- Education: Stanford University; University of Arkansas; UCLA PhD
- Occupations: professor of Eastern European studies, writer
- Known for: scholarship on the former Yugoslavia writing in English
- Notable work: Whose Democracy? Nationalism, Religion, and the Doctrine of Collective Rights in Post-1989 Eastern Europe (1997)

Sabrina Petra Ramet (born 26 June 1949) is an American academic, educator, editor and journalist. She specializes in Eastern European history and politics and is a Professor of Political Science at the Norwegian University of Science and Technology (NTNU) in Trondheim.

In 2008, the historian Dejan Djokić referred to her as "undoubtedly the most prolific scholar of the former Yugoslavia writing in English".

== Early life and education ==
Sabrina Ramet was born in London, and is of Austrian and Spanish descent. Her father, Sebastian, was born in Spain and her mother, Idra, hailed from the village of Götzis in the Austrian state of Vorarlberg. Ramet moved to the United States at age 10.

Assigned male at birth, Ramet began to question her gender identity around the age of 10. By late 1990, she began her public gender transition into a woman and used the name Sabrina.

She became a US citizen in 1966 at age 17. She served in the United States Air Force from 1971 to 1975 and was stationed at Ramstein Air Base in Germany.

Ramet was educated at Stanford University (A.B., 1971), the University of Arkansas (M.A., 1974), and University of California, Los Angeles (UCLA). She earned her PhD from UCLA in 1981.

== Career and major publications ==
Ramet has written more than 90 journal articles and contributed chapters to various scholarly collections. She is the author of 12 scholarly books and has been editor of 35 scholarly books. She writes in her native English, but her books appear in Bulgarian, Danish, German, Italian, Japanese, Macedonian, Norwegian, Polish, Serbo-Croatian, Slovenian, and Spanish.

In 1983, she became an assistant professor at the University of Washington. In 1984, her doctoral dissertation was published by Indiana University Press entitled Nationalism and Federalism in Yugoslavia, 1963–1983.

Her 1985 article Factionalism in Church-State Interaction: The Croatian Catholic Church in the 1980s, published in the Slavic Review, had a significant impact in the academic treatment of Church-State relations within communist countries. Her second monograph Cross and the Commissar, which explores religion under the Soviet bloc, was published in 1987.

Her most-cited work, Balkan Babel: Politics, Culture and Religion in Yugoslavia was released in 1992, in the midst of the Yugoslav wars.

In 1994, she became full professor at the University of Washington.

Ramet lived in England, Austria, Germany, Croatia, and Serbia before joining the Norwegian University of Science and Technology in 2001, when she settled in Norway. She continues to travel for her research in Eastern European history and politics, in Serbia, Croatia, Slovenia and Poland.

Ramet is also a senior associate at the Centre for the Study of Civil War as well as a research associate at the Science and Research Centre in Koper, Slovenia. Her translation of Viktor Meier's book, Wie Jugoslawien verspielt wurde, was published by Routledge in July 1999 in English as Yugoslavia: A History of Its Demise.

One of Ramet's early books, Whose Democracy? Nationalism, Religion, and the Doctrine of Collective Rights in Post-1989 Eastern Europe (1997), was reviewed in Terrorism and Political Violence. Her 2006 book, The Three Yugoslavias: State-Building and Legitimation, 1918–2005, was reviewed in The American Historical Review, Foreign Affairs, East European Politics and Societies and The Journal of Modern History.

In 2008, historian Dejan Djokic called Ramet "undoubtedly the most prolific scholar of the former Yugoslavia writing in English".

Ramet retired from teaching in 2019 and became professor emeritus at the Norwegian University of Science and Technology.

== Debate ==
In 2007, Serbian sociologist, historian and writer, Aleksa Đilas, sparked a debate between himself and two authors, Ramet and John R. Lampe, by publishing a critique of "the academic West" in general, and Ramet's Thinking About Yugoslavia and Lampe's Balkans into Southeastern Europe books in particular. In response professors Lampe and Ramet published a rebuttal of Đilas' critique in the same Journal of Southern Europe and the Balkans publication, in which both authors addressed his claims, while Ramet disputed his characterizations.

== Memberships ==
- Royal Norwegian Society of Sciences and Letters (since 2002)
- Norwegian Academy of Science and Letters (2009)

== Selected bibliography ==
- Nationalism and Federalism in Yugoslavia, 1963-1983 (Bloomington, Indiana: Indiana University Press, 1984)
- Cross and Commissar: The Politics of Religion in Eastern Europe and the Soviet Union (Bloomington, Indiana: Indiana University Press, 1987)
- The Soviet-Syrian Relationship since 1955: A Troubled Alliance (Boulder, Colorado: Westview Press, 1990)
- Balkan Babel: Politics, Culture, and Religion in Yugoslavia (Boulder, Coloroado: Westview Press, 1992)
- Nationalism and Federalism in Yugoslavia, 1962-1991, 2nd edition (Bloomington, Indiana: Indiana University Press, 1992)
- Ramet, Sabrina P. (1994). "Primordial Ethnicity or Modern Nationalism: The Case of Yugoslavia's Muslims, Reconsidered". Muslim Communities Reemerge: Historical Perspectives on Nationality, Politics, and Opposition in the Former Soviet Union and Yugoslavia. Durham and London: Duke University Press. pp. 111–138. ISBN 0822314908.
- Social Currents in Eastern Europe: The Sources and Meaning of the Great Transformation (Durham, North Carolina: Duke University Press, 1991); 2nd ed. 1995
- Balkan Babel: The Disintegration of Yugoslavia from the Death of Tito to Ethnic War, 2nd edition (Boulder, Colorado: Westview Press, 1996)
- Whose Democracy? Nationalism, Religion, and the Doctrine of Collective Rights in Post-1989 Eastern Europe (Lanham, Maryland: Rowman & Littlefield, 1997) — named an Outstanding Academic Book for 1997 by Choice magazine
- Nihil Obstat: Religion, Politics, and Social Change in East-Central Europe and Russia (Durham, North Carolina: Duke University Press, 1998)
- Balkan Babel: The Disintegration of Yugoslavia from the Death of Tito to the War for Kosovo, 3rd edition (Boulder, Colorado: Westview Press, 1999)
- Balkan Babel: The Disintegration of Yugoslavia from the Death of Tito to the Fall of Milosevic, 4th edition (Boulder, Colorado: Westview Press, 2002): also published in Croatian and Macedonian translations
- Ramet, Sabrina P. (2005). Thinking about Yugoslavia: Scholarly Debates about the Yugoslav Breakup and the Wars in Bosnia and Kosovo. Cambridge, UK: Cambridge University Press. ISBN 9780521616904.
- The Three Yugoslavias: State-Building and Legitimation, 1918—2005 (Bloomington, Indiana & Washington D.C.: Indiana University Press & The Wilson Center Press, 2006): also published in Croatian and German translations
- Rellgija i politika u vremenu promene: Katolicka i pravoslavne crkve u centralnoj i jugoistocnoj Evropi (Belgrade: Centar za zenske studije i istrazivanja roda, 2006)
- The Liberal Project & the Transformation of Democracy: The Case of East Central Europe (College Station, Texas: Texas A&M University Press, 2007)
- Serbia, Croatia, and Slovenia at Peace and at War: Selected Writings, 1983—2007 (Berlin & Münster: Lit Verlag, 2008)
- The Catholic Church in Polish History: From 966 to the present (Palgrave Macmillan, 2017)
- Interwar East Central Europe, 1918-1941: The Failure of Democracy-building, the Fate of Minorities (Routledge, 2020)

=== Novels ===
In addition to her academic work, Ramet has also written several novels, including the satirical Pets of the Great Dictators & Other Writings and absurdist Café Bombshell: The International Brain Surgery Conspiracy (2008), Cheese Pirates: Humorous Rhymes for Adult Children (2011), Make Marzipan, not War: Crazy Rhymes for Crazy Times (2013), History of Russia & the Soviet Union in Humorous Verse (2014), and Curse of the Aztec Dummy: A Nebraskan Chronicle (2017).
