= Croatian Union =

Defunct political party in Yugoslavia

Croatian Union Hrvatska zajednica
- Leader: Ivan Lorković; Matko Laginja
- Founded: 17 July 1919
- Dissolved: 1926
- Merger of: Milinovci; Progressive Democratic Party
- Succeeded by: Croatian Federalist Peasant Party
- Headquarters: Zagreb
- Ideology: Republicanism; Liberalism; Federalism; Croatians interests
- Political position: Center
- National affiliation: Croatian Bloc

The Croatian Union (Croatian: Hrvatska zajednica) was a Croatian political party in Kingdom of Serbs, Croats and Slovenes. The party was founded through the merger of the Milinovci and the Progressive Democratic Party. The newly formed party, led by Ivan Lorković and Matko Laginja, had its representatives in the country's provisional legislative body, the Temporary National Representation.

In the 1920 Kingdom of Serbs, Croats and Slovenes Constitutional Assembly election, the Croatian Union received 2 percent of votes in Croatia-Slavonia, winning three seats in the national assembly of the kingdom and 3 percent in Dalmatia, winning another seat there—for a total of four seats. In 1921, the Croatian Union joined the Croatian Bloc coalition dominated by the Croatian Republican Peasant Party (HRSS), adopting republicanism advocated by the HSS's leader Stjepan Radić. Following the change of programme of the HRSS, the Croatian Union left the Croatian Bloc in 1925. The party dissolved in the following year, when a portion of its membership was joined by HRSS dissidents to establish the Croatian Federalist Peasant Party, led by Lorković and Ante Trumbić.
