= John R. Lampe =

American historian (1935–2024)

John R. Lampe (December 7, 1935 – September 6, 2024) was an American educator. He was a professor of history at the University of Maryland.

== Biography ==
Lampe was born in Duluth, Minnesota, in 1935. He received his PhD from the University of Wisconsin–Madison in 1971 with a dissertation on Financial Structure and the Economic Development of Serbia, 1878–1912, written under the guidance of Rondo Cameron.

During his lifetime he published several books; his first was Balkan Economic History, 1550-1950, From Imperial Borderlands to Developing Nations, with Marvin Jackson, published by Indiana University Press in 1982. It was the winner of the first annual Vucinich Prize from the American Association for the Advancement of Slavic Studies. He is also the author of Balkans into Southeastern Europe and Yugoslavia as History: Twice There Was a Country, which was initially published in 1996 and went into a second edition in 2000.

Lampe was Director of the East European Studies program at the Woodrow Wilson International Center for Scholars. He was appointed a senior scholar there in 2007.

John Robert Lampe died on September 6, 2024, after a brief illness. He was 88.
