= Creation of Yugoslavia =

1918 proclamation of the Kingdom of Yugoslavia

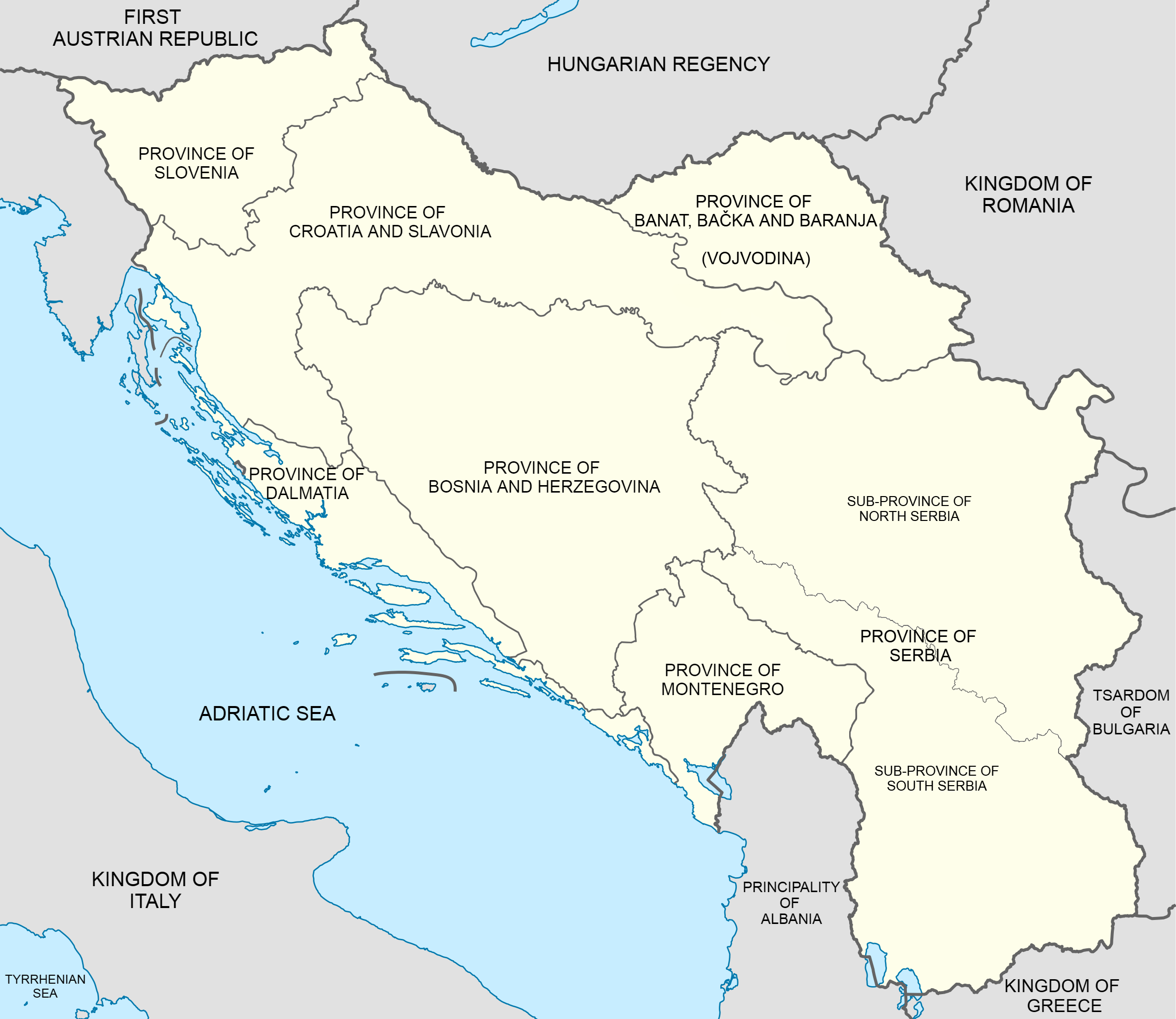
- Date: 1 December 1918
- Venue: Krsmanović House
- Location: Belgrade

The creation of Yugoslavia occurred in 1918, after the dissolution of Austria-Hungary at the end of the First World War. The country was created as a state of the South Slavs through unification of the Kingdom of Serbia and South Slavic parts of Austria-Hungary. The process was driven by two different motives. Most Croat and Slovene political parties saw the unification as the means of protection of political autonomy and preservation of cultural distinctiveness, first threatened by Hungarian and Austrian hegemony, then by Italian expansionism. Most Serb political parties saw the unification as a method of bringing all Serbs into a single state or territorial expansion of Serbia under a different name. During the first eleven years of its existence, the country was formally called the Kingdom of Serbs, Croats, and Slovenes.

During the war, while fighting Austria-Hungary, Serbia declared the unification of South Slavs one of its war objectives and negotiated the Corfu Declaration on the principles of establishment of the future state of the South Slavs with the Yugoslav Committee as an ad hoc group claiming to represent the interests of the South Slavs living in Austria-Hungary. The group was established to prevent the fulfilment of territorial promises to Italy made by the Allies involving territories with large South Slavic populations. The National Council of Slovenes, Croats and Serbs, another group representing the South Slavic peoples living in the territory of Austria-Hungary, unsuccessfully negotiated the terms of unification with Serbia. Faced with social unrest and the threat of Italian conquest, the group requested Prince Regent Alexander of Serbia to proclaim unification without any form of agreement on practical details. Establishment of Yugoslavia was announced on 1 December 1918, only days after Serbia annexed the neighbouring Kingdom of Montenegro. Yugoslavia received wider diplomatic recognition in June 1919 during the Paris Peace Conference, which determined much of its borders. A provisional government and a parliament were appointed to enact electoral law for the election of the Constitutional Assembly that adopted the first Yugoslav constitution in 1921.

== Background ==
=== Yugoslavism ===
In the first two decades of the 20th century, various political parties in Austria-Hungary and the Kingdom of Serbia adopted Yugoslavism in various forms. All the interpretations of the idea held that the South Slavs belonged to a single ethnic group speaking a shared language. There were differences in the preference for a centralised or decentralised government. Yugoslavism became a pivotal idea for establishing a South Slavic political union. For Serbs, the impetus came from the realisation that many compatriots were living outside the borders of Serbia. Most Serbs equated the idea with a Greater Serbia under a different name or a vehicle to bring all Serbs into a single state. Many Croats and Slovenes viewed Yugoslavism as a means to preserve their Croat and Slovene identities and political autonomy from germanisation and magyarisation. For them, the South Slavic unification was motivated by the realisation that a small nation state would be vulnerable to external pressures. Additionally, in Croatian politics, Yugoslavism was seen as a way to bring together Croatian population living in crown lands belonging to either Austrian or Hungarian parts of the dual monarchy into a single state.

During the First World War, pressure developed in the parts of Austria-Hungary, especially those inhabited by Croats and the Slovenes in support of the establishment of a South Slavic constituent element of the Austro-Hungarian Empire. When that idea was rejected by the Austro-Hungarian government, the idea of establishment of a South Slavic state, independent of the Empire, gained momentum. Proponents envisioned achieving this state by realising the ideals of Yugoslavism, but disagreed among themselves if Serbs, Croats, and Slovenes were separate or parts of a single ethnic group. Some sought to supersede the three by introducing a single Yugoslav nation, while others acknowledged three separate ethnic identities and wanted to accommodate them through a federation or a confederation ensuring their political and cultural autonomy.

=== National Council of Slovenes, Croats and Serbs ===
On 5–6 October 1918, as the idea of establishment of a South Slavic state gained momentum in the final weeks of the First World War, representatives of political parties representing Croats, Serbs, and Slovenes living in Austria-Hungary established the National Council of Slovenes, Croats and Serbs as a representative body seeking independence from the Empire. The body consisted of 95 voting members drawn from political parties and other organisations. On 18 October, the council declared itself the central organ of the newly proclaimed State of Slovenes, Croats and Serbs, encompassing the Slovene Lands, Croatia-Slavonia, Dalmatia and Bosnia and Herzegovina. It elected Slovene People's Party leader Anton Korošec as president. The council had two vice presidents: Svetozar Pribićević, leader of the Croat-Serb Coalition (the ruling party in Croatia-Slavonia) and Ante Pavelić, leader of the Mile Starčević faction of the Party of Rights.

=== Yugoslav Committee ===
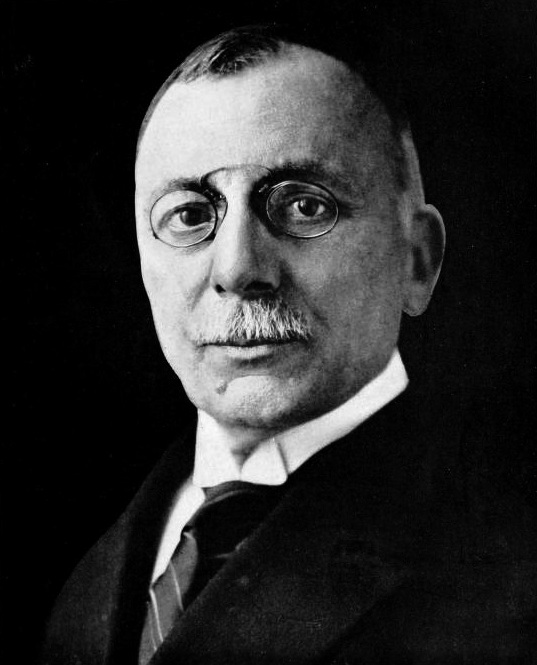
Ante Trumbić led the Yugoslav Committee.

The newly established National Council had no well-established international relations. In order to fill that gap, it authorised the Yugoslav Committee (an ad hoc group of emigrés led by Ante Trumbić which promoted the interests of Croats, Serbs, and Slovenes living in Austria-Hungary during the war) to speak on behalf of the council on 26 October 1918. The committee had established contacts the previous year with the government of Serbia, led by prime minister Nikola Pašić, and produced the Corfu Declaration which addressed the shared objective of South Slav unification in a constitutional monarchy. The declaration left unresolved the choice between a unitary state (advocated by Pašić) and a federation (advocated by Trumbić). It held that a federal constitution of the new state was needed to ensure that Serbia (or Serbs) would not dominate future common governments.

Regardless of differences, the Yugoslav Committee leadership had a cautious approach in its relationship with Serbia. It had learned about the Treaty of London, where the Allies had offered Italy substantial Austro-Hungarian territories with sizeable Croat and Slovene populations, and realised that political alignment with Serbia might be the only way to ensure that all Croats and Slovenes lived in a single country. The committee had also learned that the Allies had offered Serbia territory, which included the part of Dalmatia not already promised to Italy, as well as Slavonia, Bosnia and Herzegovina and Bačka. This led its leaders to conclude that Croatian lands (Note: The Croatian lands were variously defined in late 19th and early 20th century. At the minimum, the Illyrian movement, championed by Josip Juraj Strossmayer, thought of the Croatian lands as the Triune Kingdom consisting of Croatia-Slavonia and Dalmatia. On the other hand, Ante Starčević and his adherents in the Party of Rights interpreted the term as the Greater Croatia consisting of the Triune Kingdom, Bosnia and Herzegovina, and the Slovene lands.) would be divided between Italy and Serbia with the remainder potentially offered to Hungary in a plot to break up the Austro-Hungarian state.

=== Kingdom of Serbia ===
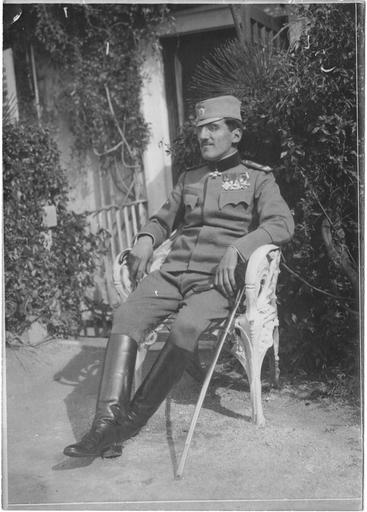
Regent Alexander became de facto head of Serbian state with transfer of powers from his father, King Peter I, to him in 1914.

Serbia, an independent kingdom since 1878, considered the war an opportunity for territorial expansion at the expense of Austria-Hungary. A committee tasked with determining Serbia's war aims produced a programme to establish a South Slavic state by adding the South Slav-inhabited parts of the Habsburg lands—Croatia-Slavonia, the Slovene Lands, Vojvodina, Bosnia and Herzegovina, and Dalmatia—to Serbia. After several military setbacks in the Serbian campaign, the National Assembly of Serbia announced the unification of the South Slavs as its national war aim in its December 1914 Niš Declaration. The declaration was intended to attract support from South Slavs living in Austria-Hungary. The government was motivated to appeal to the South Slavs, since it feared that little material support was coming from the Triple Entente allies. Nikola Pašić wanted to abandon the Niš Declaration in 1916 and reduce the wartime objectives to liberation of Serbian territory, i.e. ending the Austro-Hungarian occupation of Serbia and gaining control of areas inhabited by ethnic Serbs outside prewar Serbian borders, but he was overruled by Prince Regent Alexander of Serbia.

On 29 September 1918, in the final stages of the war, Bulgaria signed the armistice of Salonica after the collapse of its defensive positions on the Macedonian front and withdrew from the war. The Allied Army of the Orient, commanded by French General Louis Franchet d'Espèrey, rapidly advanced north as a result and recaptured ground lost to the Central Powers in the Great Retreat from Serbia in 1915. By 1 November, Serbian and French troops reached Belgrade. (Note: The troops consisted of the Serbian First Army under vojvoda Petar Bojović and the French Armée d'Orient, led by General Paul Prosper Henrys.) The troops stopped to rest there, with only minimal forces deployed across the Danube and Sava rivers: Serbia's pre-war border with Austria-Hungary. The liberation of Serbia was largely complete.

== Prelude ==
=== State of Slovenes, Croats and Serbs ===
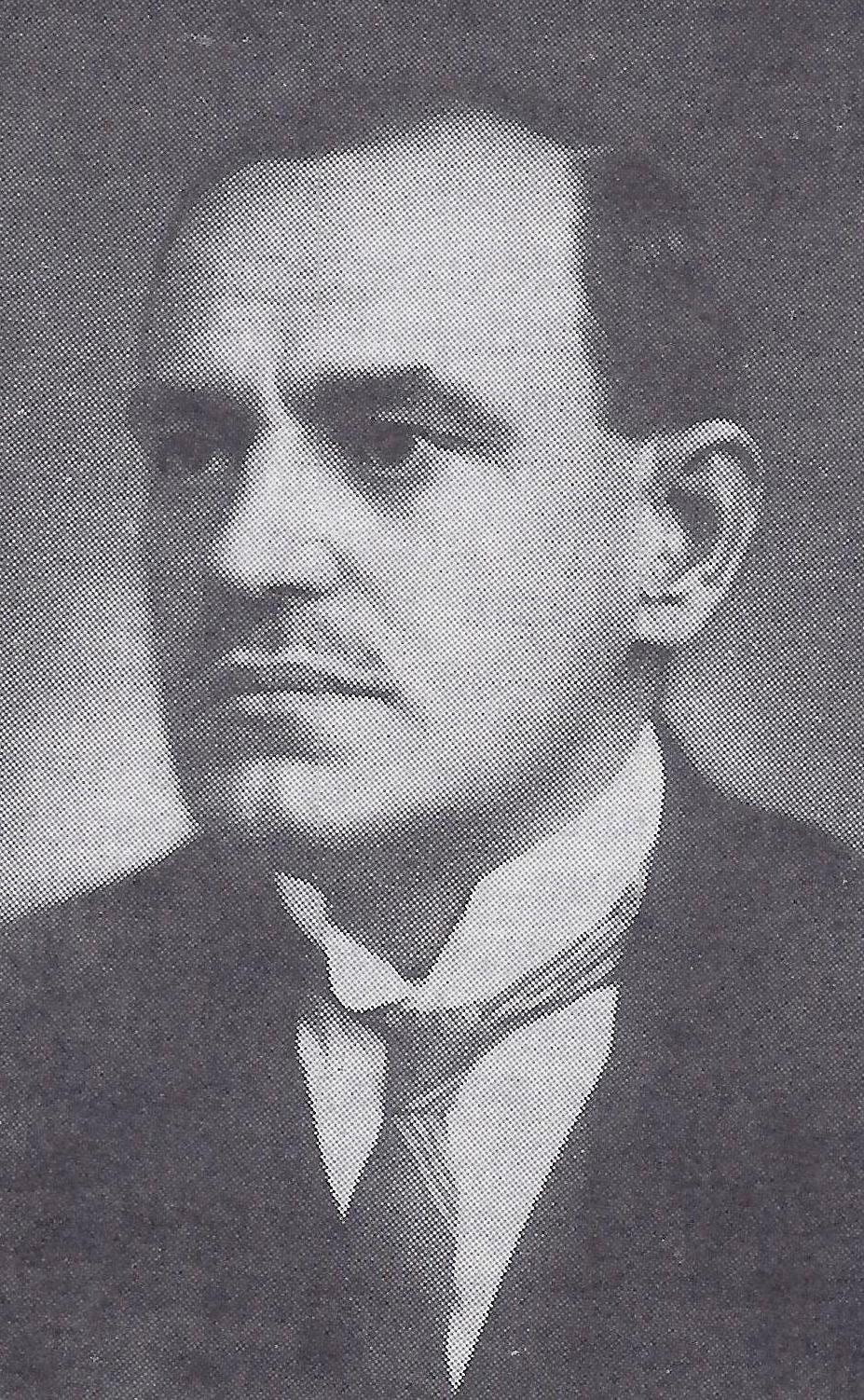
Svetozar Pribićević was among the leading proponents of unconditional, speedy unification.

On 23 October, the National Council of Slovenes, Croats and Serbs contacted the Ban of Croatia Antun Mihalović as the head of the executive authority in the country and informed him of intention to declare independence. Mihalović advised the National Council representatives to convene the Sabor of Croatia-Slavonia – the legislative body of the Kingdom of Croatia-Slavonia, a nominally autonomous kingdom within Austria-Hungary. Mihalović also gave advice on the decisions Sabor should make in order to break away from Austria-Hungary while complying with the law. (Note: Ante Pavelić and Svetozar Pribićević likely contacted Ban Antun Mihalović on 22 October asking about his intentions if the National Council of Slovenes, Croats and Serbs were to declare independence from Hungary. On 25 October, proposed decisions of the Sabor were drawn up, and the next day the National Council asked generals Luka Šnjarić and Mihael Mihaljević commanding the Zagreb-based 13th Corps of the Austro-Hungarian Common Army and the Royal Croatian Home Guard respectively about their intentions in case of declaration of independence from Austria-Hungary. The generals replied by placing themselves at the disposal of the National Council after they obtained a release from their oath of allegiance from the Emperor Charles I of Austria. On 28 October, Mihalović reported the situation to the emperor who told the ban he was free to proceed as he saw fit.)

The Sabor voted on a series of proposals by Pribićević and Pavelić, who commanded the parliamentary majority, on 29 October. The Sabor declared the end of ties between Austria-Hungary and Croatia-Slavonia, claiming Dalmatia and the city of Rijeka. (Note: The city of Rijeka was provisionally organised as the corpus separatum under the Croatian–Hungarian Settlement of 1868 and the decree of Emperor Franz Joseph I of 1870, ruled from Budapest. The city was claimed by Croatia-Slavonia, itself an autonomous part of the Hungarian portion of Austria-Hungary.) It then declared that an independent Croatia would join the State of Slovenes, Croats and Serbs established in the South Slav-inhabited territory previously ruled by Austria-Hungary, noting that the country would claim territory from the Soča River to the city of Thessaloniki on the Aegean coast. Finally, the Sabor delegated its powers to the National Council. Regional councils, subordinate to the National Council, were established in Ljubljana, Sarajevo, and Split to represent Slovenia, Bosnia and Herzegovina, and Dalmatia. The Slovene and Bosnia-Herzegovinian councils were formed in agreement with the central, Zagreb-based National Council on 30 October, but the Dalmatian body was set up on 2 November without consulting Zagreb.

On 31 October, the National Council declared that the State of Slovenes, Croats and Serbs was ready to form a common state with Serbia. However, the council was divided on the method of unification and the form of the country's government. Pribićević led the group advocating unconditional, rapid unification, but Croat members of the body were more cautious about the potentially-dominant Serbian position in the unified state and the risk to Croat individuality. On 1 November, Korošec invited Trumbić and Pašić to talks in Geneva, leaving Pavelić and Pribićević in control of the National Council. Two days later, Korošec unsuccessfully asked the Allied Powers to formally recognise the State of Slovenes, Croats and Serbs. The British and the Italians wanted to leave the recognition for the future peace conference and the French agreed. According to the French prime minister Georges Clemenceau, the delay was meant to appease Italy. The only recognition was by Serbia, five days later.

Social disorder gripped Croatia where looting of farms and businesses and destruction of property became commonplace. The violence was associated with the Green Cadres, largely consisting of soldiers returning home from the war. There was a widespread belief in the region that the dissolution of Austria-Hungary would bring about redistribution of wealth to peasants. Even though the violence developed some characteristics of a revolution, historian Ivo Banac concluded that communist ideas were not a significant factor in the events. The violence forced the National Council to institute courts-martial and ask the Serbian government to deploy the Royal Serbian Army to quell the unrest on 5 November. The National Council dispatched Laza Popović, Svetozar Pribićević's brother Valerijan, and Dragutin Perko to Belgrade to request that Serbian army units be deployed to the regions of Syrmia and Slavonia east of the Osijek–Slavonski Šamac rail line and placed under National Council control. Regardless of the request, the Serbian government instructed the Serbian First Army to capture Banat and Bačka and the Second Army to advance west to Croatia, Bosnia and Herzegovina, and Dalmatia; Serbian troops began heading towards these regions on 5 November. Austria-Hungary had surrendered by that time, and the Italian armed forces advanced into Istria and landed at Zadar in Dalmatia to occupy territories promised to Italy under the 1915 Treaty of London within the framework of Allied occupation of the eastern Adriatic.

=== Geneva conference ===
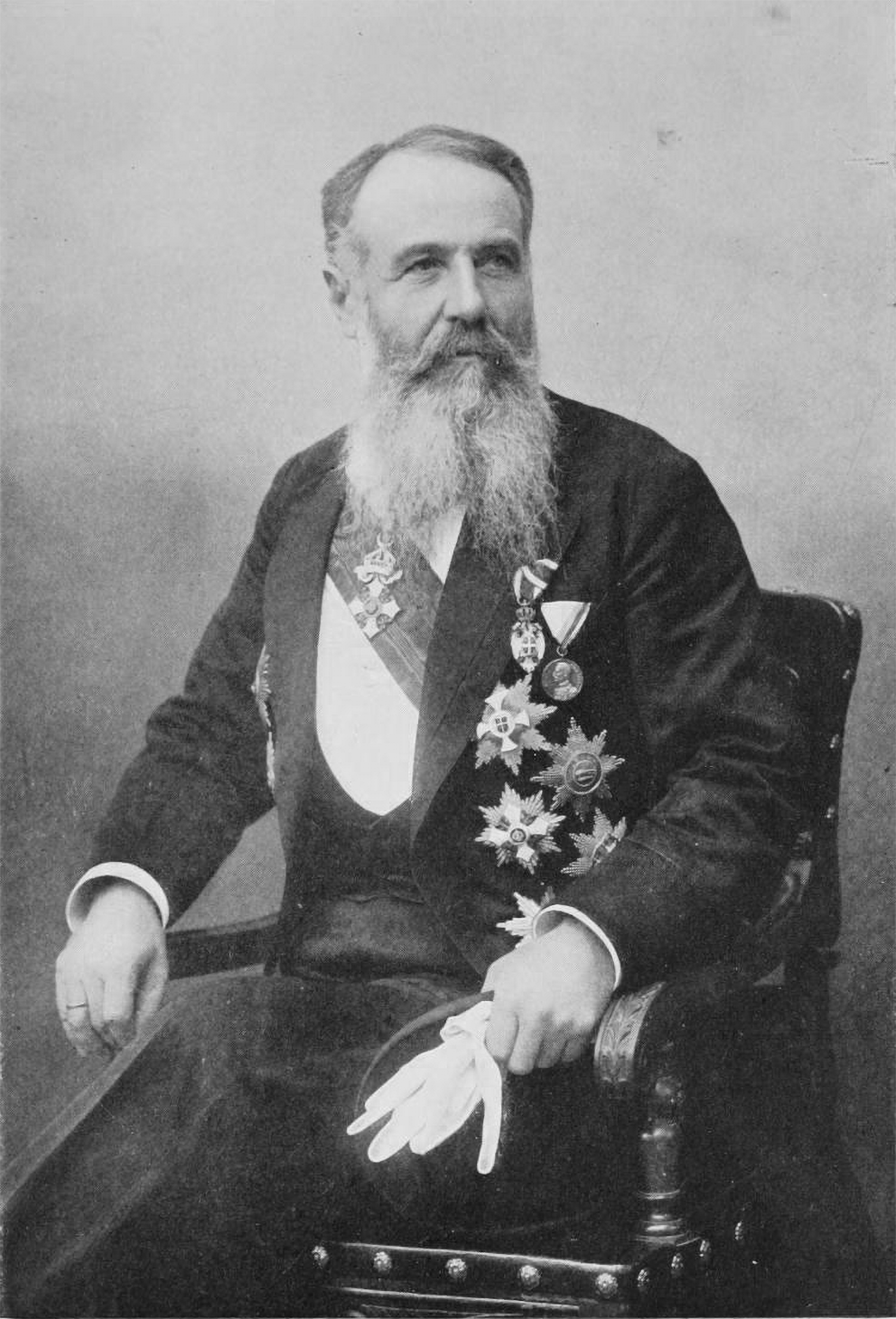
Prime Minister Nikola Pašić negotiated the short-lived Geneva Declaration.

In response to the Korošec's invitation to Pašić and Trumbić of 1 November, the representatives of the National Council, supported by the Yugoslav Committee, met with Pašić and representatives of Serbia's parliamentary opposition parties in Geneva from 6 to 9 November. The conference negotiated details of the system of government of the future unified South Slav state. The meeting resulted in the Geneva Declaration, a document defining the new state as a confederation with a limited central government formed by the Kingdom of Serbia and the State of Slovenes, Croats and Serbs acting as equal partners. The declaration also invited the Kingdom of Montenegro to join the process of unification. Days later, the Serbian government repudiated the Geneva Declaration. Banac assessed the Geneva Declaration's acceptance and subsequent repudiation as Pašić's tactic to commit the National Council and Yugoslav Committee to speedy unification, relying on Svetozar Pribićević to undermine Korošec's authority in the National Council.

On 13 November, when the Armistice of Belgrade was signed, Lieutenant Colonel Dušan Simović arrived in Zagreb as representative of the Serbian army's supreme command. Simović was welcomed by Svetozar Pribićević, Pavelić, Ivan Lorković, and others. Either Lorković or Pavelić (Note: Sources disagree who presented the idea of a federation to Lieutenant Colonel Dušan Simović. According to historian Zlatko Matijević, it was Ivan Lorković, but according to historian Charles Ingrao and philosopher and legal scholar Lazar Vrkatić it was Ante Pavelić.) described the State of Slovenes, Croats and Serbs as an entity independent of Serbia, but united with Serbia in a federation. Simović was tasked with threatening the annexation of State of Slovenes, Croats and Serbs territories if the National Council in Zagreb were uncooperative. He pointed out that Serbia was victorious in the war and was promised Slavonia to the Osijek—Đakovo—Šamac line, Bosnia and Herzegovina, and Dalmatia south of Cape Planka, adding that it would seize those territories in the absence of unification. This caused Pavelić to walk back the idea of a federation. Simović's idea was interpreted as a credible threat to establish a Greater Serbia and leave a rump Croatia outside the new south-Slavic state. Historian Charles Ingrao and philosopher and legal scholar Lazar Vrkatić interpreted Simović's speech as blackmail on behalf of the army and Regent Alexander, demanding capitulation to accept speedy unification as annexation and postponing determination of the system of government. On 14 November, Pašić informed Trumbić and Korošec that the Geneva Declaration was rejected by the Serbian government and the regent. According to Ingrao and Vrkatić, Alexander undermined the declaration because it deprived Serbia of the role of sole leader of the political unification of the South Slavs and did not guarantee the House of Karađorđević, Serbia's ruling dynasty, the right to rule the entire country.

== Pressure for urgent unification ==
=== Lipošćak affair ===
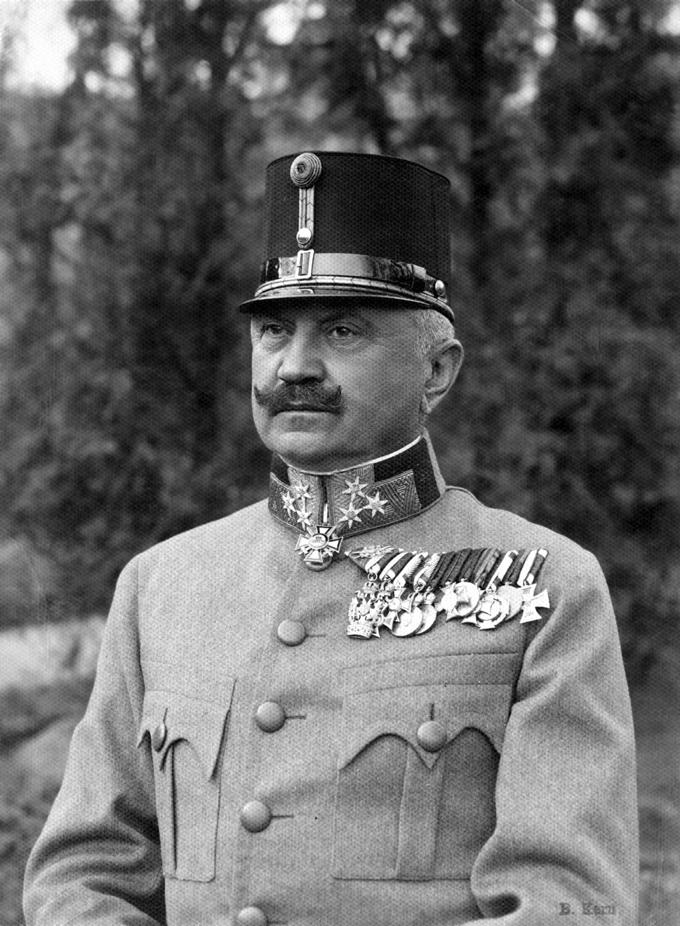
General of the Infantry Anton Lipošćak was charged with treason on 22 November 1918.

After repudiation of the collapse of the negotiations in Geneva and Simović's remarks, the urgency of unification increased for the National Council. The sense of urgency was further increased by the threat posed by the advance of the Italian forces that captured Rijeka and were advancing through Carniola, reaching the vicinity of Ljubljana around the same time. On 19 November, Vice Admiral Enrico Millo was appointed governor of Italy's newly established Governorate of Dalmatia to administer Italy's new territory.

On 22 November, a day before the scheduled National Council meeting to debate unification, internal instability and social disorder became a priority for the National Council. On that day, Simović reported uncovering a plot against the National Council. He alleged the conspirators were aiming to establish councils composed of workers, peasants and soldiers in place of the National Council. The alleged ringleader of the coup d'état was former Austro-Hungarian General of the Infantry Anton Lipošćak, who had just returned to Zagreb after the armistice. After Lipošćak's arrest, the press speculated that the conspiracy involved disgruntled Austro-Hungarian officers, that the conspirators were supported by Stjepan Radić of the Croatian Peoples' Peasant Party or allied with Italian or Hungarian interests, and that Lipošćak was a Bolshevik (or pretending to be a Bolshevik) aiming to restore the Habsburg Empire. Some press reports said that the conspirators planned to arrest the National Council to prevent its work to unify the South Slavs. Simović's report turned out to be false and Lipošćak was cleared of all charges in January 1919, but the affair gave Svetozar Pribićević a pretext to demand rapid unification with Serbia for security reasons.

=== Unification decision and instructions ===
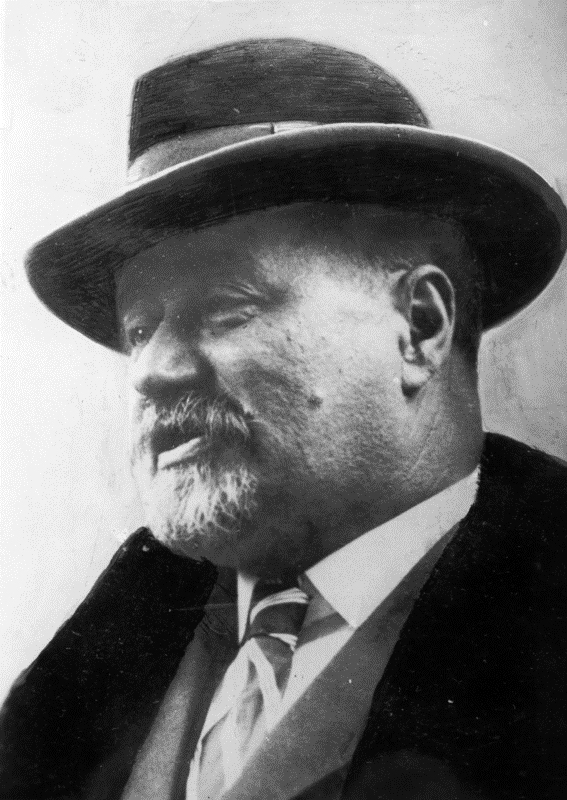
Stjepan Radić led the opposition to unconditional unification.

The central committee of the National Council convened in Zagreb on 23 November. The meeting, chaired by Svetozar Pribićević, assessed the overall situation as critical and demanded immediate action to avoid chaos in the country. The committee also discussed a provincial Dalmatian National Council resolution to urge the central committee of the National Council to complete unification with Serbia without delay. The resolution, signed and presented by Ivo Krstelj and Josip Smodlaka, cautioned the National Council that Dalmatia would unilaterally join Serbia unless unification was decided within five days. The Dalmatian resolution and ultimatum were motivated by the fear of further Italian territorial conquest. The central committee was also informed that the Sarajevo-based National Council supported the Dalmatian government's resolution, and Bosnia and Herzegovina would follow their example. On 24 November, the second day of the central-committee meeting, an assembly was convened at Ruma in Syrmia. The unelected assembly, with the region's largest towns not represented, adopted a resolution stating that Syrmia would secede from Croatia-Slavonia and be annexed to the Kingdom of Serbia unless the National Council in Zagreb decided to unite with Serbia.

The most significant opposition to speedy unification at the meeting came from Radić, who believed that unification was proposed against the will of most Croats. He then made a noteworthy speech meant as a final warning against the National Council's reckless approach to unification, comparing their step into uncertain territory to wandering "like drunken geese into a fog". Radić proposed an alternative plan, calling for a confederation led by three regents: the king of Serbia, the Ban of Croatia and the president of the Slovene National Council, who would appoint ministers for foreign affairs, defence, and food distribution. Radić was rejected by the National Council for "extreme separatism". His proposal foresaw autonomous state governments in Slovenia, Croatia, Serbia, and Montenegro and provincial autonomous governments in Bosnia and Herzegovina, Dalmatia, and Vojvodina, all accountable to state (or provincial) diets.

The central committee pursued immediate unification with Serbia. It appointed a 28-person delegation to travel to Belgrade to arrange for unification, and adopted instructions to the delegation. (Note: The delegation consisted of Frane Barac, Izidor Cankar, Luka Čabrajić, Mate Drinković, Šćepan Grđić, Halid Hrasnica, Vitomir Korać, Anton Korošec, Albert Kramer, Anton Kristan, Matko Laginja, Ivan Lorković, Edo Lukinić, Savo Ljubibratić, Ivan Paleček, Ante Pavelić, Živko Petričić, Dušan A. Popović, Svetozar Pribićević, Stjepan Radić, Josip Smodlaka, Vasa Stajić, Joso Sunarić, Hamid Svrzo, Janko Šimrak, Vojislav Šola, Ante Tresić Pavičić, and Ante Trumbić. Radić, Trumbić, Lorković, and Korošec did not go to Belgrade. Korošec was replaced by Janko Brejc.) The delegation was instructed to insist on a federal system of government in the new country. The instructions required the delegation to insist on adoption of a national constitution by a two-thirds majority vote, designated the regent a provisional ruler until the constitution was in place, named foreign affairs, defence, railway and maritime transport, finances and post as the domain of the central government, and prescribed the preservation of all existing administrative and judicial bodies. The plan and instructions were adopted by the majority, with only Radić and Dragutin Hrvoj dissenting. On 26 November, two days after the delegation was appointed, there was a debate about the date the delegation would go to Belgrade. The meeting ended with no formal agreement reached. Svetozar Pribićević asked the members who supported his views to remain after the meeting, and the group decided that the delegation would go to Belgrade the following day. The group also expelled Radić from the National Council's central committee. (Note: The first meeting ended at 10 p.m. in the Sabor building. The second meeting convened after the majority of the central committee members went home. The remaining members, largely consisting of Pribićević faction, short of majority of the central committee, concluded the meeting an hour later and dispatched messengers to absent members to inform them of the decisions made on behalf of the committee.) The expulsion was justified by Radić's speech branding the National Council as selfish and vain fanatics out of touch with common people at his party's assembly days earlier. (Note: Radić accused the National Council of being undemocratic, unconstitutional, unjust, and unwise in its attempts to accomplish the unification with Serbia into a centralised state by any means. He said that the National Council was wrong to claim the centralised monarchy was necessary to guard against Italian conquest because it would go as far as the Allies permitted, regardless of the National Council. Radić reaffirmed support for unification of the South Slavs in a federation.)

== November annexations ==
Pašić thought that the lands of vital interest to Serbia should be annexed to the kingdom directly. In his view, those areas comprised the regions of Bačka, Banat, and southern Baranja (collectively referred to as Vojvodina) neighbouring Serbia to the North, and Montenegro, sandwiched between Serbia and the Adriatic Sea. In Pašić's view Bosnia and Herzegovina, to the West of Serbia, was a special case: It was not as important as Vojvodina and Montenegro, but more critical than other South Slavic lands outside the existing Serbian borders.

=== Vojvodina ===
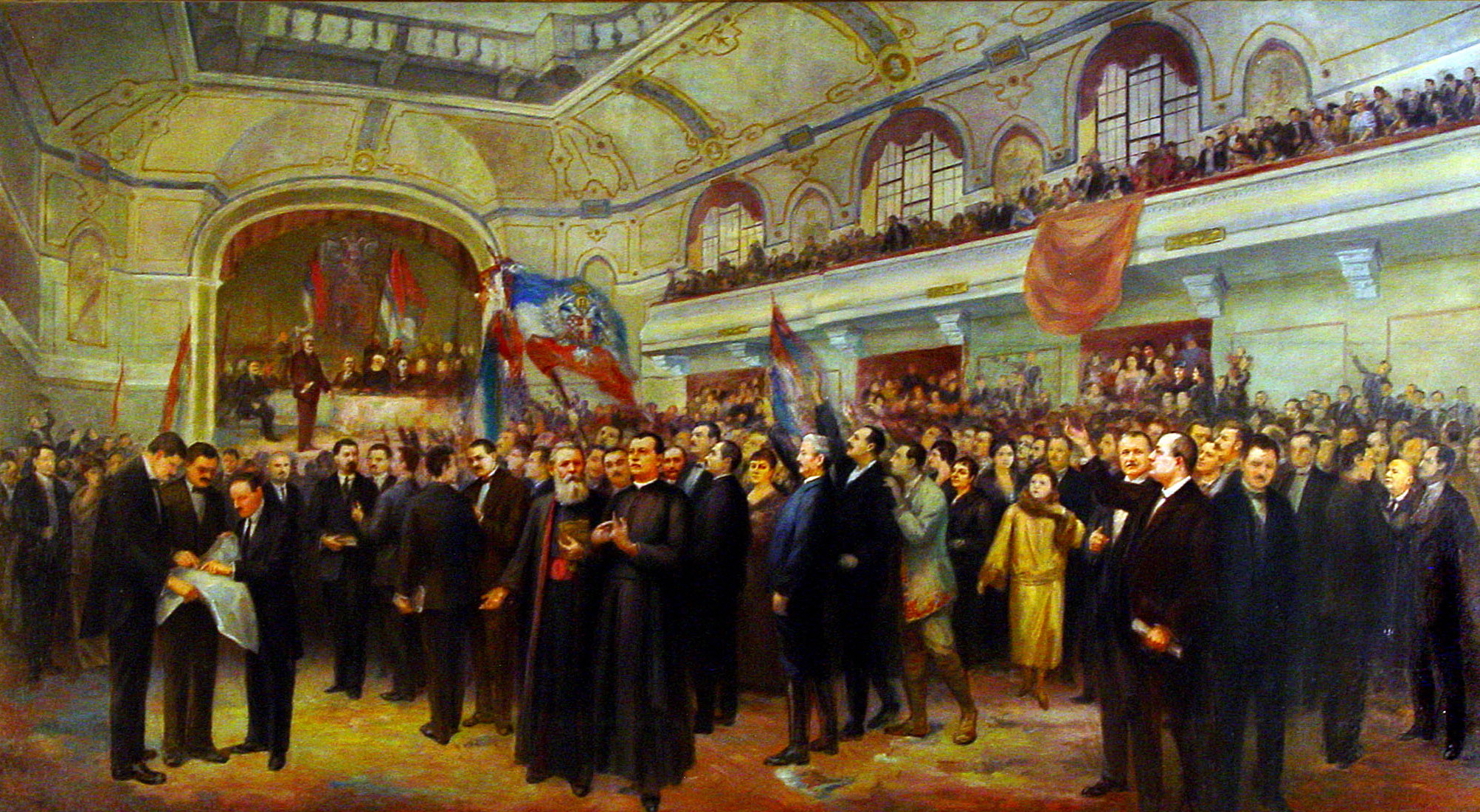
Painting of the 25 November Great People's Assembly of Serbs, Bunjevci and other Slavs in Banat, Bačka and Baranja

Serbs living in Vojvodina mainly supported leaving Austria-Hungary, but were divided on the method—through the National Council in Zagreb, or through close ties with Serbia. Early support for the National Council was replaced by the view that the territories should be annexed by Serbia. On 3 November, the Serbian National Committee was established in Novi Sad to facilitate the annexation. A competing movement, the short-lived autonomous Banat Republic (nominally within Hungary) was declared in the eponymous region. The Banat National Council proclaimed the republic in Timișoara on 1 November, relying on support from the Hungarian and German communities. Serbian troops continued to advance north across Vojvodina early that month, capturing the territory and displacing civilian and self-proclaimed authorities.

A conference was convened in Novi Sad on 17 November in compliance with instructions from the Serbian government, and elections were announced for the Great People's Assembly of Serbs, Bunjevci and other Slavs in Banat, Bačka and Baranja. The purpose of the conference was to consult the Slavic population of Vojvodina. The elections produced 757 delegates to the assembly, claiming to represent Banat, Bačka and Baranja. They included 578 Serbs, 84 Bunjevci, three Šokci, two Croats, 62 Slovaks, 21 Ruthenians, six Germans and one Hungarian. The non-Slavic population of Vojvodina, which exceeded 60 percent of the total, was represented in the assembly by one percent of the delegates. The assembly in Novi Sad on 25 November produced two resolutions. The first, quickly accepted by the Serbian government, specified that the territory was part of Serbia and asked the government of Serbia to represent Banat, Bačka and Baranja at the upcoming Paris Peace Conference.

The second resolution announced the establishment of a regional National Council to administer the territory, and the new border was determined by the army's advance. The resolution breached an earlier Allied decision that only the Paris Peace Conference could determine national borders. According to Ingrao and Vrkatić, the second resolution upheld application of existing (Hungarian) law in Vojvodina; however, the Serbian government recognised neither the National Council nor laws other than those of Kingdom of Serbia in Vojvodina. In addition to acquisition of the region, the annexation of Vojvodina was meant to affirm the roles of the Royal Serbian Army and Regent Alexander as major factors in the unification of the South Slavs.

=== Montenegro ===
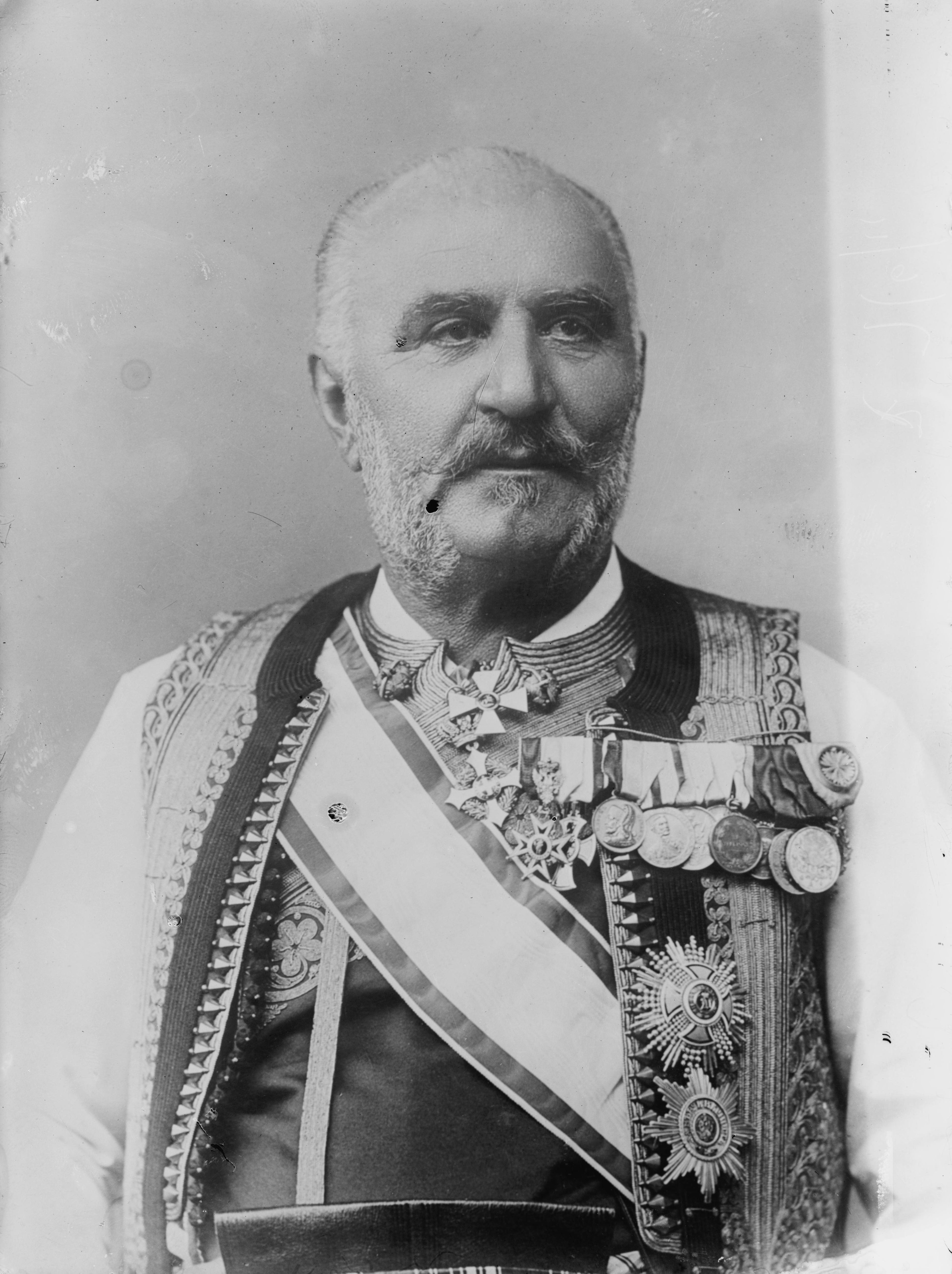
King Nikola was deposed in the run-up to the unification of Yugoslavia.

King Nikola and most of the government left Montenegro in early 1916, fleeing an Austro-Hungarian offensive. A government-in-exile was established in France – briefly in Bordeaux, then in Neuilly-sur-Seine. Ministers who had remained in the country declared a new government and surrendered to Austria-Hungary, attributing the surrender to the king's departure. Failing to obtain international support for the restoration of Montenegro's independence during the Austro-Hungarian occupation, Nikola gradually shifted his approach to Yugoslavism and advocated a South Slavic federation (or confederation) with Montenegro as an element. Before the end of the war, former Prime Minister Andrija Radović emerged as a leading advocate for the integration of Montenegro into Serbia. In collaboration with the Serbian government, he established the Montenegrin Committee for Unification in 1917. The two opposing political camps both supported political unification of the South Slavs, but differed about the level of state centralisation; historian Marko Attila Hoare categorised the groups as "annexationists" and "autonomists".

The Entente Powers began their advance at the Salonica front in September 1918, reclaiming territory occupied by Serbia. As part of the offensive, a task force known as the Adriatic Troops (Jadranske Trupe) was diverted into Montenegro ahead of supporters of Nikola or Italian forces, perceived as a threat by Serbia due to Italy's demand for the establishment of an Italian condominium in Montenegro which would have brought to power Nikola's supporters and prevented annexation of Montenegro to Serbia. The Adriatic Troops, led by Colonel Dragutin Milutinović, were tasked by the Regent Alexander with preventing Nikola's return. Accompanied by Spasojević (a member of the Montenegrin Committee) and Svetozar Tomić (head of the Montenegrin section of the Serbian Foreign Ministry), Milutinović established the Central Executive Committee for the Unification of Serbia and Montenegro on 28 October. The committee, consisting of Spasojević, Tomić and Berane mayor Milosav Raičević, were tasked with organizing a popular assembly and establishing rules for the election of assembly delegates.

The rules, adopted on 7 November, stipulated that elected delegates would convene in Podgorica; Podgorica was chosen because Montenegrin capital, Cetinje, was a stronghold of Nikola's supporters beyond the control of assembly organisers. The annexationists and the autonomists, known as the Whites and Greens (after the respective colours of their candidate-list papers) argued about the legality and legitimacy of the election. The Whites objected because the election rules were not formulated by a Montenegrin legislative body and contravened existing law. They considered the election illegitimate due to lack of oversight of voting and absence of a minimum voter turnout requirement. The Greens saw the process as a plebiscite that legitimised the new assembly. A total of 165 delegates were to be elected. The election, held on 19 November, resulted in a significant assembly majority for the Whites. According to historian Srdja Pavlović, the Royal Serbian Army prevented the Greens from returning from abroad and interfering with the electoral process. French authorities prevented Nikola from returning to Montenegro from his exile. The Podgorica Assembly convened on 24 November, voting to remove Nikola from the Montenegrin throne two days later. The assembly decided that Montenegro and Serbia would be united under Serbia's ruling Karađorđević dynasty, joining the common state of the "three-named people" (Serbs, Croats, and Slovenes). An executive committee was elected to coordinate the unification work and send notices of the resolution to Nikola, the Serbian government, and Allied and neutral countries. The decision was unanimously adopted, with three delegates absent from the vote. Ingrao and Vrkatić characterised the process as the annexation of Montenegro by Serbia.

=== Bosnia and Herzegovina ===
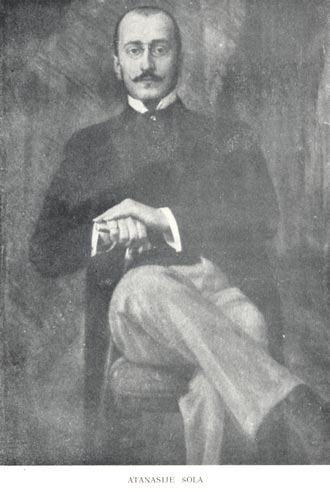
Atanasije Šola led the government of Bosnia and Herzegovina during the unification of Yugoslavia.

Although Bosnia and Herzegovina was not annexed by the Kingdom of Serbia during the political unification of the South Slavs, there were pressures on its government (led by Atanasije Šola) to begin such a project. There was a significant grassroots pressure on Šola to request annexation by Serbia. Forty-two of 54 district-level national councils established in the final phase of the dissolution of Austria-Hungary voted to support initiatives proclaiming the unification of Bosnia and Herzegovina with Serbia. Most of the initiatives came from the region of Bosanska Krajina, especially the town of Banja Luka. The Serbian government instructed the Royal Serbian Army to assist the government of Bosnia and Herzegovina in its pursuit of unification and pressured Šola's government, appointed by the National Council on 30 October, to unilaterally declare unification with Serbia.

According to Ingrao and Vrkatić, Šola's resistance stemmed from support by Regent Alexander. The regent thought it necessary for Bosnia and Herzegovina to join the political union of the South Slavs through the State of Slovenes, Croats and Serbs, ensuring that Croatia joined the union as well. He believed that Croatia would not have joined the new state without Bosnia and Herzegovina, regardless of Italian threats. Ingrao and Vrkatić concluded that this was why the Serbian armed forces in Bosnia and Herzegovina did not introduce military administration, although it might have been easier to introduce than in Vojvodina or Montenegro; the regent was motivated by narcissism and his conviction that a Serb state would be too small for him.

== Proclamation of unification ==
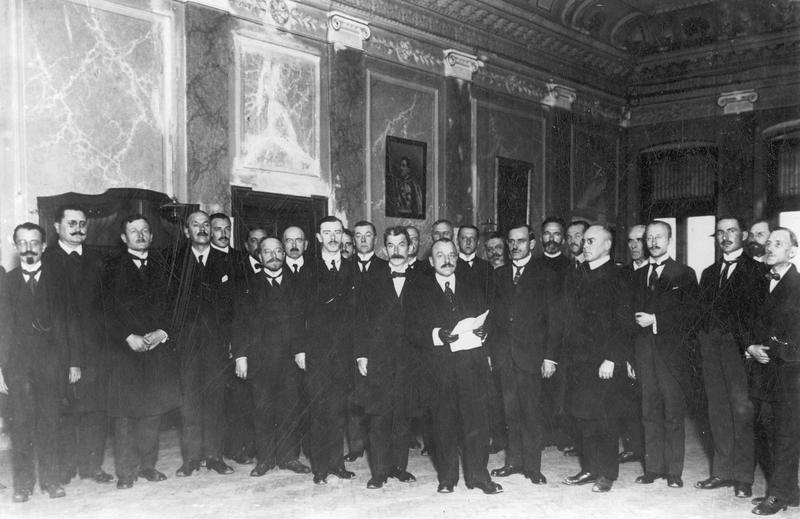
The delegation of the National Council of Slovenes, Croats and Serbs reading their Address to the Throne

The delegation of the National Council departed for Belgrade from the Zagreb main railway station on the morning of 27 November. The group was accompanied by financial advisers and Serbian Army Lieutenant Colonel Milan Pribićević, Svetozar's brother. The delegation arrived in Belgrade the following day. Since Pašić was not in the country, they were hosted by the regent. The delegation received a ceremonial welcome before individual members were given an audience with the regent. They were joined by Stojan Protić, Ljubomir Jovanović, and Momčilo Ninčić as representatives of the government, who spoke to the delegation about how unification should be proclaimed. Their discussions resulted in the appointment of a committee of six (Protić, Jovanović, Ninčić, Svetozar Pribićević, Pavelić and Smodlaka), who would determine the tone of the delegation's address to the regent and the regent's proclamation in response. The delegation appointed an additional five-member committee tasked with formulating the delegation's address to the regent; the document's authorship is disputed. The instructions from the National Council to the delegation were kept by Janko Šimrak in his pocket, but they were not consulted. (Note: Janko Šimrak was the secretary of the National Council.)

Svetozar Pribićević convinced the delegation, against objections by Pavelić, to ignore the instructions and leave the decision about the new state's system of government for a later date. He argued that the delegation's address should only profess loyalty to the regent. His argument was reinforced by the Serbian government representatives' position, which was contrary to the ideas in the delegation's instructions. Pavelić and others agreed with Svetozar Pribićević's proposal to negotiate features of the future state's system of government, although the delegation was not authorised to do so. They felt that they could not overcome the political opposition while Italian military advances created further pressure. The pressure increased on 30 November, when a telegram from the Dalmatian government implored the negotiators to act quickly. The delegation abandoned many aspects of its instructions, agreeing to a centralised interim government. Among the few elements retained in the agreed text was a reference to the new state as an expression of will of three states: the Kingdoms of Serbia and Montenegro, and the State of Slovenes, Croats and Serbs.

The final meeting of the National Council delegation and the Serbian government representatives was on 1 December, when the texts of the delegation's address to the regent and the regent's response were reviewed. It was agreed that the proclamation ceremony of the unified state would take place at the regent's temporary residence at Krsmanović House, in the Terazije district of Belgrade. The ceremony began at eight p.m. The delegation's Address to the Throne presented a list of wishes, with no conditions or safeguards, and was read by Pavelić. In his reply, the regent omitted any mention of Montenegro and any form of autonomous government. He then proclaimed the unification of the Kingdom of Serbia and the lands of the State of Slovenes, Croats and Serbs to deny the legitimacy of the State of Slovenes, Croats and Serbs. The proclamation marked the birth of the Kingdom of Serbs, Croats, and Slovenes, which would be renamed Yugoslavia in 1929. The Yugoslav Committee had proposed the country be named Yugoslavia in 1917, but the idea was rejected by the Serbian government at the time of the unification. Regardless of the formal name, officials and population referred to the country as Yugoslavia for convenience.

== Aftermath ==
=== Allied occupation and recognition ===
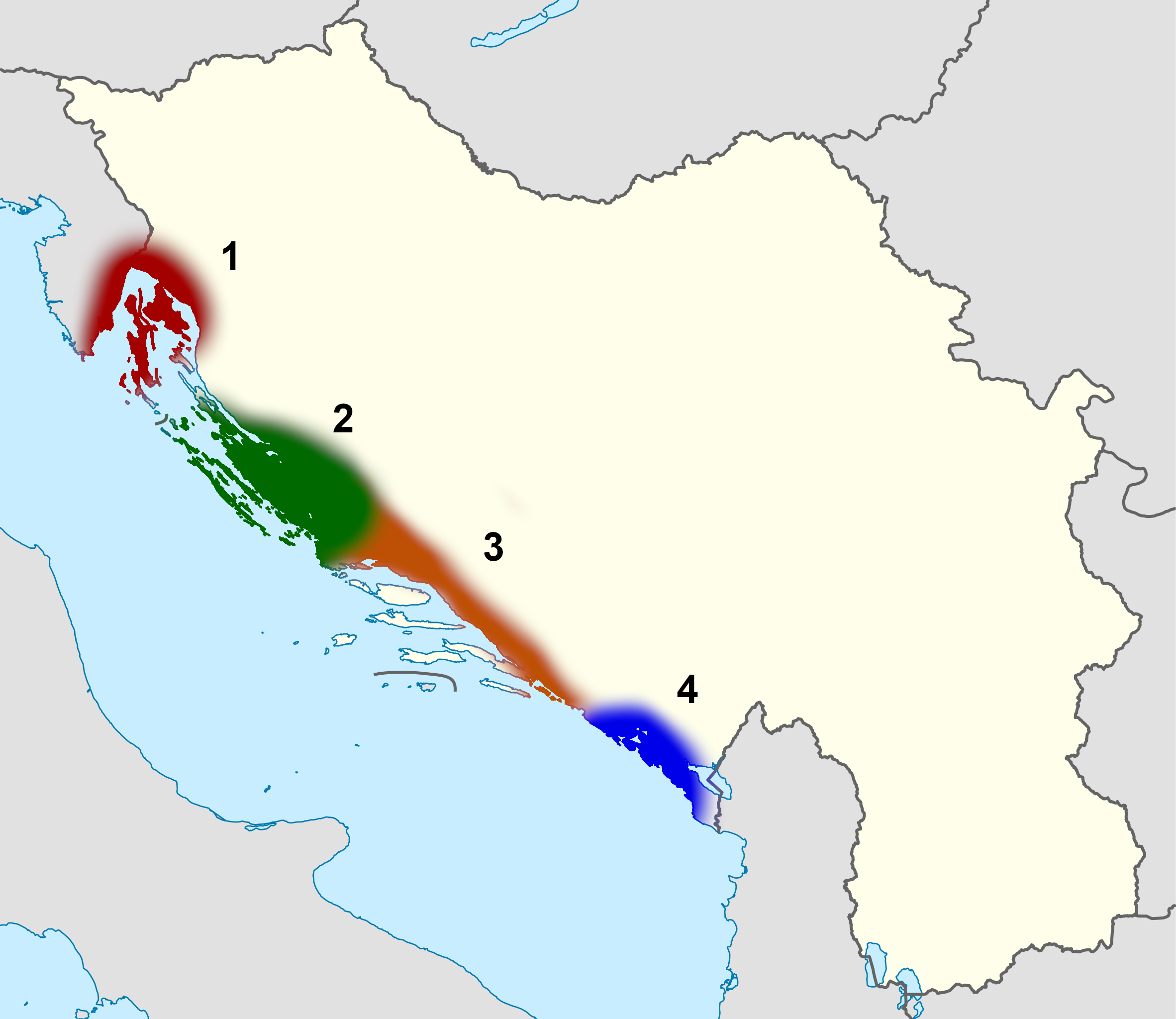
Zones of the Allied occupation of the eastern Adriatic: 1 British 2 Italian 3 American 4 French

Yugoslavia did not receive immediate diplomatic recognition by the Allied powers; the Yugoslav delegation to the Paris Peace Conference was treated as that of the Kingdom of Serbia. The United States began the process of diplomatic recognition in February 1919, but the remaining Allies withheld it at the insistence of Italy. A temporary Italian boycott of the conference due to an inter-Allied dispute led to wider recognition of Yugoslavia at the signing of the Treaty of Versailles in June 1919.

Regardless of recognition, Allied occupation of the Adriatic coast (established immediately after the Armistice of Villa Giusti) continued. The occupation was organised into four zones in which Italy, the United States, France, and the United Kingdom had formal command of Allied forces. British involvement ended when Allied troops, including Italian, were withdrawn from Rijeka in response to the September 1919 arrival of Italian irredentist and nationalist Gabriele D'Annunzio with troops loyal to him. D'Annunzio proclaimed the establishment of the Italian Regency of Carnaro, which lasted for fifteen months. Military rule persisted in portions of the Italian and French zones until December 1920. The US mission left in September 1921, ending the occupation.

=== Borders and population ===
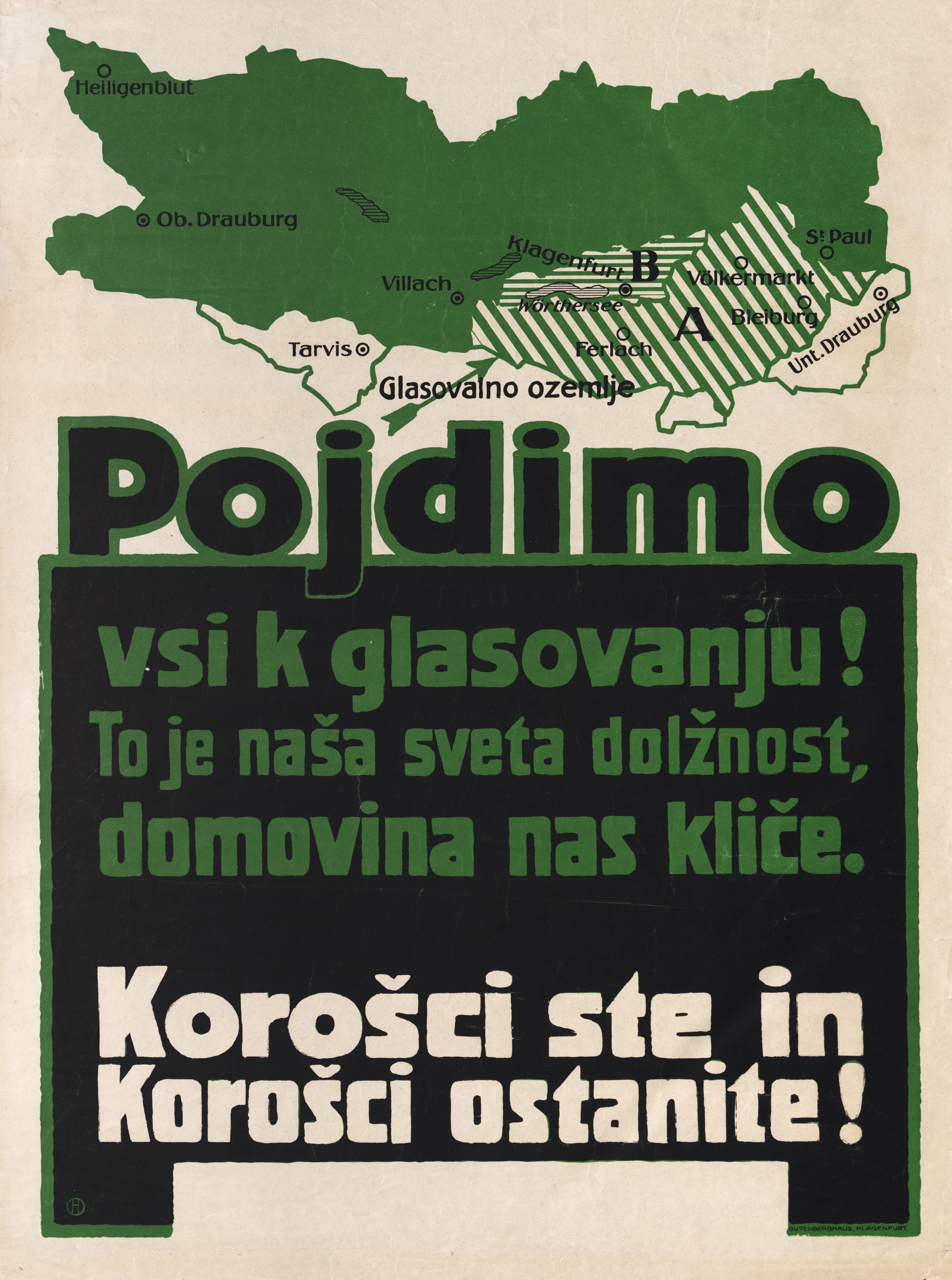
Austrian propaganda poster urging the population of Carinthia to vote in the 1920 Carinthian plebiscite

The peace conference determined a portion of Yugoslavia's borders. The frontier with the Republic of German-Austria was established through the Treaty of Saint-Germain-en-Laye in September 1919. The treaty followed the Austro-Slovene conflict in Carinthia, where Slovene leaders – including Korošec – pressured the Serbian (later Yugoslav) military to enforce territorial claims in parts of Carinthia and Lower Styria, occupied the Carinthian capital of Klagenfurt, and used the military to assert control in the Styrian city of Maribor on Marburg's Bloody Sunday. The fighting was ended by the treaty, and the border dispute was resolved by the 1920 Carinthian plebiscite.

The Bulgarian–Yugoslav border was determined in November 1919 with the Treaty of Neuilly-sur-Seine. The Romanian–Yugoslav frontier resulted from the occupation of Banat, followed by partition of the region by the Allies (who returned its eastern part to Romania). The Allied decision was made in June 1919; Romania accepted it six months later, relinquishing its earlier claim to the entire Banat region. The Yugoslav border with Hungary was settled with the Treaty of Trianon in June 1920. The treaty upheld Yugoslav annexation of Vojvodina and the seizure of Međimurje and Prekmurje, with some border adjustments.

The border between Italy and Yugoslavia, known as the Adriatic and Fiume questions, became a major point of dispute at the Paris Peace Conference. Since Yugoslav and Italian diplomats could not agree on the border between the countries, the Allies instructed them to settle the issue with direct negotiations after the Paris Peace Conference. The negotiations took place in November 1920, resulting in the Treaty of Rapallo. The treaty defined the border, giving Italy Istria, the Julian March, the city of Zadar, and several islands. It also established the independent Free State of Fiume.

Yugoslavia had its first census in 1921, after its borders were defined. The census indicated a population of just over 12 million, approximately two-thirds of whom were living in the former Austro-Hungarian lands. Belgrade, the country's capital, was a slightly larger city than Zagreb; both had a population of about 110,000. The country was ethnically diverse. Just under 39 percent of its population were Serbs or Montenegrins; nearly 24 percent were Croats, and 8.5 percent were Slovenes. Approximately 46 percent of the population belonged to the Eastern Orthodoxy, while 39 percent were Roman Catholics. There was also a significant Islamic community. Three-quarters of the population lived by farming. The literacy rate was among Europe's lowest. It varied by province from nearly 100 percent in Slovenia to 35 percent in Serbia.

=== Interim bodies ===
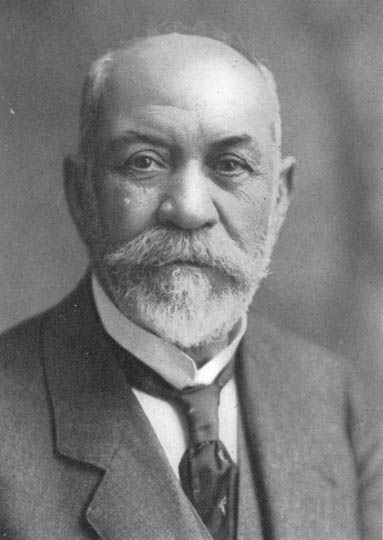
Stojan Protić was appointed the first prime minister of Yugoslavia.

The first Yugoslav government was appointed by the regent. The principal political parties began governmental negotiations on 11 December 1918 and agreed that Pašić should be the prime minister. Despite this agreement, the regent appointed Protić prime minister on 20 December. Although Protić belonged to the People's Radical Party (NRS), 11 of 17 government ministers were drawn from the Democratic Party (DS, the leading Serbian centrist party). Serbs, comprising less than 39 percent of the population, were overrepresented in the government, especially in the leading positions. In 268 months of existence the interwar Yugoslavia, a Serb was its prime minister for all but four months, the internal, foreign, and justice ministers were Serbs for 240, 247, and 237 months respectively. A Serb general was always the minister in control of armed forces. By 1938, out of 165 generals of the Royal Yugoslav Army, all except four were ethnic Serbs. (Note: All Royal Serbian Army officers were retained by the new Royal Yugoslav Army by default. Non-Serbian officers, including ethnic Serbs of Croatia had to apply and, if accepted, were often paid less or given inferior ranks and posts than their Serbian counterparts. Before the First World War, 15 percent of the Austro-Hungarian Armed Forces' general officers were of Croatian origin.)

An interim parliament was established as the Temporary National Representation (Privremeno narodno predstavništvo, or PNP) by Regent Alexander's decree of 24 February 1919. It convened for the first time in Belgrade on 1 March. According to Banac, the delay was intended to ensure that the government was free to implement decisions designed to centralise the country without interference from the PNP. The government contested the PNP's right to enact any legislation, except for the election of the Constitutional Assembly and determination of its agenda. The PNP was generally composed of people who had served on a legislative or consultative body, and most of its 294 members were appointed (rather than elected). The national council did not select its representatives; a political ally drew up a list of representatives for appointment by the regent. The elections for the 419 members of the Constitutional Assembly were held in November 1920. The newly elected assembly adopted the Vidovdan Constitution in June 1921, confirming a centralised system of government for interwar Yugoslavia. The constitution was adopted by a simple majority of thirteen votes. The following decade was marked with parliamentary crises and continued clashes between advocates of centralism and federalism and ended in royal dictatorship.

=== Economic integration and unrest ===
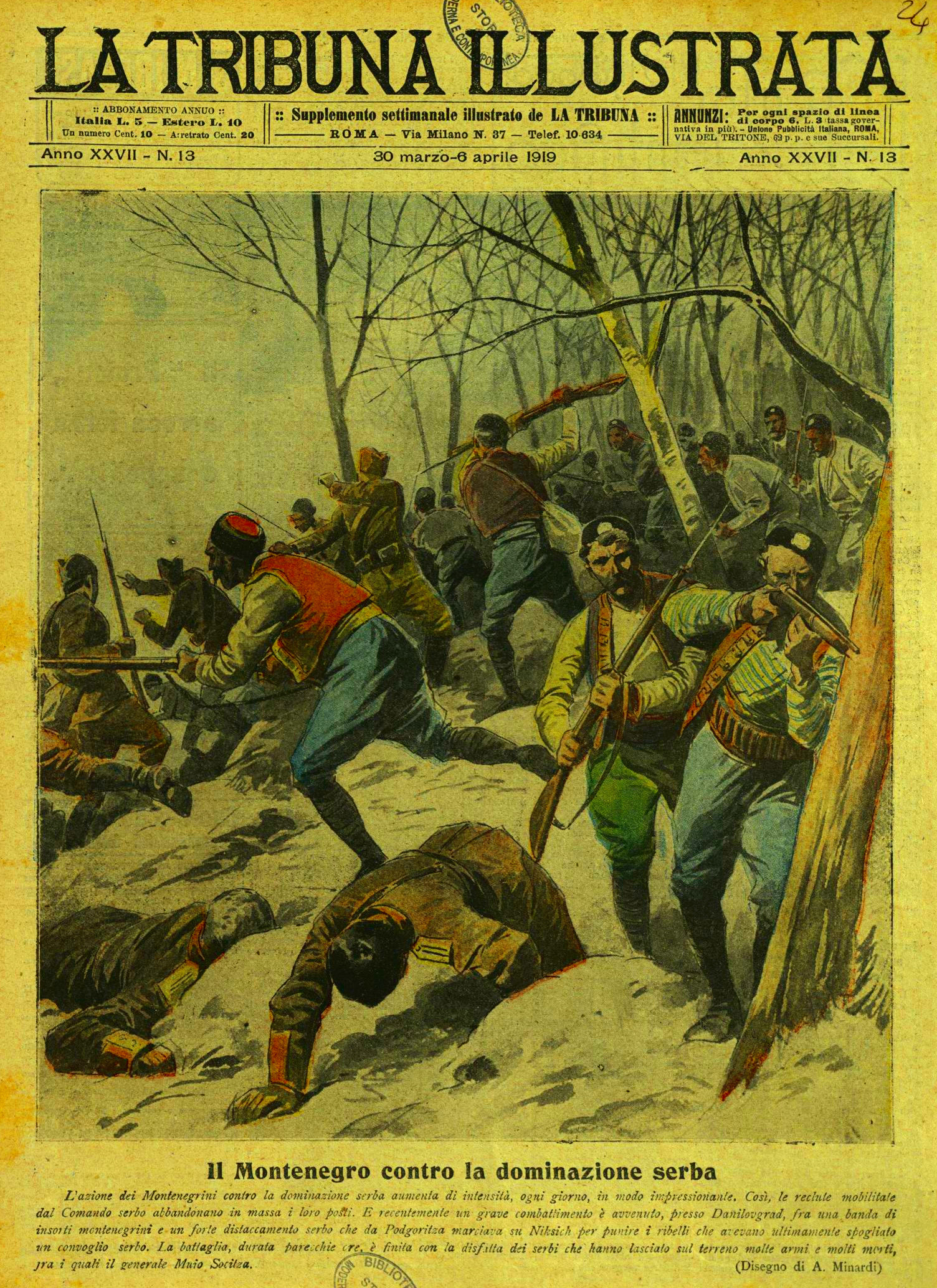
1919 La Tribuna Illustrata reporting on the Christmas Uprising

Immediately after political unification, the government faced problems of economic integration. Some provinces had a greater trade volume with foreign markets than with other Yugoslav provinces, due to earlier political divisions and pre-existing infrastructure. Yugoslavia inherited four separate railway systems, five different currencies, six customs areas, and six legal systems. Policies adopted to achieve economic integration often caused mutual resentment by ethnic groups and political problems, including the introduction of the Yugoslav krone as an interim currency before a single Yugoslav currency and the 1919 land reform. Serbian industry, concentrated in and around Belgrade, experienced significant war damage and was slow to recover due to its underdeveloped railway network. These problems led to increased unemployment and low wages, which contributed to the popularity of the nascent Communist Party of Yugoslavia and allowed Croatia's industry (largely centred on Zagreb) to outgrow that of Serbia. The two were of comparable size before the war, but Zagreb's industrial output was four times greater than that of Belgrade by 1926.

Social unrest was widespread in the country in the early period after the creation of Yugoslavia. Days after the proclamation of unification, a large anti-monarchy protest in Zagreb was violently suppressed. Before 1920, the Croatian countryside saw widespread violence – some ethnic, but primarily the looting of large estates and shops. The 1920 Croatian Peasant Rebellion was triggered by an army campaign to brand draft animals. More significant violence occurred in Kosovo, where a series of uprisings by ethnic Albanians was known as the Kachak Movement. In response, the government deployed the army to the area and launched a campaign to settle Serbs and Montenegrins on land confiscated from the rebels. Bosnia and Herzegovina also experienced widespread ethnic violence, in which Bosnian Serbs killed or evicted several thousand Muslim Bosniaks and seized their land. Ethnic violence against the Muslim population in the Sandžak region of Montenegro included the Šahovići massacre. Elsewhere in Montenegro, the pro-independence Greens faction launched the unsuccessful Christmas Uprising in 1919. The following year, the Orthodox Church in Montenegro lost its de facto autonomy and was integrated into the Serbian Orthodox Church.

== See also ==
- History of the Balkans

== Sources ==
- "The Treaty of Rapallo: Complete Official Text of the Italo-Jugoslav Pact, for the First Time Presented in English". Current History. 13 (2, Part II). Berkeley: University of California Press: 223–226. 1921. ISSN 0011-3530. JSTOR 45325919.
- Alebić-Juretić, Ana (2025). "Much Dispute About a Small Free City: From St. Veit an der/am (P)Flaum [Fiume] to Rijeka". In Edelmayer, Kira; Kühnel, Ferdinand; Wakounig, Marija (eds.). Central Europe in Times of Change. Münster: LIT Verlag. pp. 253–270. ISBN 978-3-643-91816-1.
- Banac, Ivo (1984). The National Question in Yugoslavia: Origins, History, Politics. Ithaca: Cornell University Press. ISBN 0-8014-1675-2.
- Banac, Ivo (1992). "'Emperor Karl Has Become a Comitadji': The Croatian Disturbances of Autumn 1918". The Slavonic and East European Review. 70 (2). London: Modern Humanities Research Association: 284–305. ISSN 0037-6795. JSTOR 4210927.
- Batović, Ante; Kasalo, Branko (2021). "Great Britain and the Adriatic Question after World War I". In Bralić, Ante; Kasalo, Branko (eds.). The Eastern Adriatic Between the Collapse of the Habsburg Monarchy and the Creation of New States. Zadar: University of Zadar. pp. 299–330. ISBN 978-953-331-341-2.
- Becherelli, Alberto (2016). "Montenegro betrayed: The Yugoslav unification and the controversial inter-allied occupation". Balkan Studies (51). Thessaloniki: Institute for Balkan Studies: 69–104. ISSN 2241-1674.
- Biondich, Mark (2011). The Balkans: Revolution, War, and Political Violence Since 1878. Oxford: Oxford University Press. ISBN 9780191559518.
- Boban, Ljubo (1993). "Kada je i kako nastala Država Slovenaca, Hrvata i Srba" [When and How Did the State of Slovenes, Croats, And Serbs Come into Existence]. Journal of the Institute of Croatian History (in Croatian). 26 (1). Zagreb: Croatian Institute of History: 187–198. ISSN 0353-295X.
- Bojović, Jovan R. (1989). Podgorička skupština 1918: dokumenta [Podgorica Assembly in 1918: Documents] (in Serbian). Gornji Milanovac: Dečje novine. ISBN 9788636702093.
- Cipriani, Carlo Cetteo (2016). "Itaalia sõjaline okupatsioon Dalmaatsias 1918–1921" [Italian military occupation in Dalmatia in 1918–1921: the fate of a former part of the Austro-Hungarian Empire]. Eesti sõjaajaloo aastaraamat (in Estonian). 6 (12). Tallinn: Tallinn University Publishing House: 85–116. ISSN 2228-0669.
- Cohen, Philip J. (1996). Serbia's Secret War: Propaganda and the Deceit of History. College Station: Texas A&M University Press. ISBN 9780890967607.
- Davidonis, Anthony C. (1943). The American Naval Mission in the Adriatic, 1918–1921 (PDF). Washington, DC: United States Department of the Navy. OCLC 1112737551.
- Djokić, Dejan (2003). "(Dis)integrating Yugoslavia: King Alexander and Interwar Yugoslavism". In Djokić, Dejan (ed.). Yugoslavism: Histories of a Failed Idea, 1918-1992. London: C. Hurst & Co. pp. 136–156. ISBN 1-85065-663-0.
- Djokić, Dejan (2019). "Vek Jugoslavije: Kako i zašto su Srbi, Hrvati i Slovenci stvorili zajedničku državu" [The Century of Yugoslavia: How and Why the Serbs, Croats and Slovenians Established a Common State]. Tragovi: časopis za srpske i hrvatske teme (in Serbian). 2 (1). Zagreb: Srpsko narodno vijeće, Arhiv Srba u Hrvatskoj: 25–51. ISSN 2623-8926.
- Dragnich, Alex N. (1983). The First Yugoslavia: Search for a Viable Political System. Stanford: Hoover Institution Press. ISBN 9780817978419.
- Hoare, Marko Attila (2024). Serbia: A Modern History. London: Hurst Publishers. ISBN 978-1-80526-157-5.
- Ingrao, Charles W.; Vrkatić, Lazar (2001). Unlearnt Lesson: Central-European Idea and Serb National Program. Belgrade: Helsinki Committee for Human Rights in Serbia. ISBN 978-86-7208-048-3.
- Ivoš, Erma (1999). "Odnos talijanskih vojno-civilnih vlasti (centralnih i pokrajinskih) u okupiranom dijelu Dalmacije 1919. godine" [The Relationship Between Italian Military and Civil Government (Central and Provincial) in the Occupied Part of Dalmatia in 1919]. Politička misao (in Croatian). 36 (1). Zagreb: University of Zagreb: 183–203. ISSN 0032-3241.
- Janković, Dragoslav (1964). "Ženevska konferencija o stvaranju jugoslovenske zajednice 1918. godine" [Geneva Conference on Creation of the Yugoslav Community in 1918]. Istorija XX veka [History of the 20th Century] (in Serbian). Vol. V. Belgrade: Institute of Legal History of the University of Belgrade Faculty of Law. pp. 225–262. OCLC 67000822.
- Karaula, Željko (2008). "30 dana što su potresli Bjelovar – Odbor narodnog vĳ eća Bjelovara tokom studenog 1918. godine" [30 Days That Shocked Bjelovar – The National Council Committee of the City of Bjelovar During November of 1918]. Radovi Zavoda za znanstveni rad Varaždin (in Croatian) (19). Varaždin: Croatian Academy of Sciences and Arts - Institute for Scientific Research Work in Varaždin: 251–274. ISSN 0352-9509.
- Krizman, Bogdan (1970a). "The Belgrade Armistice of 13 November 1918". The Slavonic and East European Review. 48 (110). London: UCL School of Slavonic and East European Studies: 67–87. ISSN 0037-6795. JSTOR 4206164.
- Krizman, Bogdan (1970b). "Stjepan Radić i Hrvatska pučka seljačka stranka u prvom svjetskom ratu" [Stjepan Radić and the Croatian People's Peasant Party in World War I]. Časopis za suvremenu povijest (in Croatian). 2 (2). Zagreb: Croatian Institute of History: 99–165. ISSN 0590-9597.
- Lampe, John R. (2000). Yugoslavia as History: Twice There Was a Country (2nd ed.). Cambridge: Cambridge University Press. ISBN 0-521-77357-1.
- MacMillan, Margaret (2002). Paris 1919: Six Months That Changed the World. New York City: Random House Publishing Group. ISBN 9780375760525.
- Marin, Irina (2013). Contested Frontiers in the Balkans: Ottoman and Habsburg Rivalries in Eastern Europe. London: Bloomsbury Academic. ISBN 978-1-78076-105-3.
- Matijević, Zlatko (2008). "The National Council of Slovenes, Croats and Serbs in Zagreb (1918/1919)". Review of Croatian History. 4 (1). Zagreb: Hrvatski institut za povijest: 51–84. ISSN 1845-4380.
- Matković, Hrvoje (1993). "Svetozar Pribićević u danima postojanja Države Slovenaca, Hrvata i Srba" [Svetozar Pribićević in the Days of Existence of the State of Slovenes, Croats and Serbs]. Radovi Zavoda za hrvatsku povijest Filozofskoga fakulteta Sveučilišta u Zagrebu (in Croatian). 26 (1). Zagreb: Faculty of Humanities and Social Sciences, University of Zagreb: 237–248. ISSN 0353-295X.
- Mitrinović, Čedomil; Brašić, Miloš N. (1937). Jugoslovenske narodne skupštine i sabori [Yugoslav National Assemblies and Diets] (in Serbian and French). Belgrade: National Assembly of the Kingdom of Yugoslavia. OCLC 11391185.
- Newman, John Paul (2010). "Post-imperial and Post-war Violence in the South Slav Lands, 1917-1923". Contemporary European History. 19 (3). New York: Cambridge University Press: 249–265. doi:10.1017/S0960777310000159. ISSN 0960-7773. JSTOR 20749812. S2CID 62795053.
- Nielsen, Christian Axboe (2014). Making Yugoslavs: Identity in King Aleksandar's Yugoslavia. Toronto: University of Toronto Press. ISBN 9781442627505.
- Pavlović, Srdja (2008). Balkan Anschluss: The Annexation of Montenegro and the Creation of the Common South Slavic State. West Lafayette: Purdue University Press. ISBN 978-1-55753-465-1.
- Pavlović, Vojislav G (2019). "Italy and the Creation of Yugoslavia. Delenda Austria?". In Pavlović, Vojislav G. (ed.). Serbia and Italy in the Great War. Belgrade: Institute for Balkan Studies. pp. 245–278. ISBN 9788671791038.
- Pavlowitch, Kosta St. (2003). "The First World War and Unification of Yugoslavia". In Djokic, Dejan (ed.). Yugoslavism: Histories of a Failed Idea, 1918–1992. London: C. Hurst & Co. pp. 27–41. ISBN 1-85065-663-0.
- Pizzi, Katia (2001). A City in Search of an Author. London: Sheffield Academic Press. ISBN 9780567244970.
- Ramet, Sabrina P. (2006). The Three Yugoslavias: State-building and Legitimation, 1918–2005. Bloomington: Indiana University Press. ISBN 9780253346568.
- Rudolf, Davorin (2008). "Granice s Italijom u mirovnim ugovorima nakon Prvoga i Drugog svjetskog rata" [Borders With Italy in Peace Treaties Following World War I and World War II]. Adrias: Zbornik radova Zavoda za znanstveni i umjetnički rad Hrvatske akademije znanosti i umjetnosti u Splitu (in Croatian) (15). Zagreb: Croatian Academy of Sciences and Arts: 61–80. ISSN 0352-9924.
- Rusinow, Dennison (2003). "The Yugoslav Idea before Yugoslavia". In Djokić, Dejan (ed.). Yugoslavism: Histories of a Failed Idea, 1918-1992. London: C. Hurst & Co. pp. 11–26. ISBN 1-85065-663-0.
- Sirotković, Hodimir (1993). "O nastanku, organizaciji, državnopravnim pitanjima i sukcesiji Države SHS nastale u jesen 1918" [The Origin, Organization, Legal Issues, and Succession of the State of Slovenes, Croats and Serbs]. Radovi Zavoda za hrvatsku povijest Filozofskoga fakulteta Sveučilišta u Zagrebu (in Croatian). 26 (1). Zagreb: Faculty of Humanities and Social Sciences, University of Zagreb: 199–208. ISSN 0353-295X.
- Štambuk-Škalić, Marina; Matijević, Zlatko, eds. (2008). "Narodno vijeće Slovenaca, Hrvata i Srba u Zagrebu 1918–1919. (izabrani dokumenti)" [National Council of Slovenes, Croats and Serbs in Zagreb 1918–1919 pagp(Selected Documents)]. Fontes: Izvori Za Hrvatsku Povijest (in Croatian). 14 (1). Zagreb: Croatian State Archives: 71–596. ISSN 1330-6804.
- Unkovski-Korica, Vladimir (2016). "World War II and the National Question: The Origins of the Autonomous Status of Vojvodina in Yugoslavia". Europe-Asia Studies. 68 (10). London: Routledge: 1712–1735. doi:10.1080/09668136.2016.1257700. ISSN 0966-8136. JSTOR 26156925.
- Vucinich, Wayne S. (1969). "Interwar Yugoslavia". In Vucinich, Wayne S. (ed.). Contemporary Yugoslavia: Twenty Years of Socialist Experiment. Berkeley: University of California Press. pp. 3–58. ISBN 9780520331112.
- Wasserstein, Bernard; Grenville, John Ashley Soames (2001). The Major International Treaties of the Twentieth Century. Abingdon-on-Thames: Routledge. ISBN 978-0-415-14125-3.
- Zorko, Tomislav (2003). "Afera Lipošćak" [The Lipošćak Affair]. Časopis za suvremenu povijest (in Croatian). 35 (3). Zagreb: Croatian Institute of History: 887–902. ISSN 0590-9597.

Region	until 1918	1918– 1929	1929– 1945	1941– 1945	1945– 1946	1946– 1963	1963– 1992	1992– 2003	2003– 2006	2006– 2008	since 2008
Slovenia	Part of Austria-Hungary including the Bay of Kotor See also: Kingdom of Croatia-Slavonia (1868–1918) Kingdom of Dalmatia (1815–1918) Condominium of Bosnia and Herzegovina (1878–1918)	State of Slovenes, Croats and Serbs (1918) Kingdom of Serbs, Croats and Slovenes (1918–1929) Kingdom of Yugoslavia (1929–1943) See also: Republic of Prekmurje (1919) Banat, Bačka and Baranja (1918–1919) Free State of Fiume (1920–1924) (1924–1945) Italian province of Zadar (1920–1947)		Annexed by Italy, Germany, and Hungary^{a}	Democratic Federal Yugoslavia (1943–1945) Federal People's Republic of Yugoslavia (1945–1963) Socialist Federal Republic of Yugoslavia (1963–1992) Consisted of the Socialist Republics of: Slovenia (1945–1991); Croatia (1945–1991); Bosnia and Herzegovina (1945–1992) Serbia (1945–1992) (included the autonomous provinces of Vojvodina and Kosovo) Montenegro (1945–1992); Macedonia (1945–1991) See also: Free Territory of Trieste (1947–1954)^{h}			Republic of Slovenia; Ten-Day War			
Dalmatia	Part of Austria-Hungary including the Bay of Kotor See also: Kingdom of Croatia-Slavonia (1868–1918) Kingdom of Dalmatia (1815–1918) Condominium of Bosnia and Herzegovina (1878–1918)	State of Slovenes, Croats and Serbs (1918) Kingdom of Serbs, Croats and Slovenes (1918–1929) Kingdom of Yugoslavia (1929–1943) See also: Republic of Prekmurje (1919) Banat, Bačka and Baranja (1918–1919) Free State of Fiume (1920–1924) (1924–1945) Italian province of Zadar (1920–1947)		Independent State of Croatia (1941–1945) Puppet state of Germany. Parts annexed by Italy. Međimurje and Baranja annexed by Hungary.	Democratic Federal Yugoslavia (1943–1945) Federal People's Republic of Yugoslavia (1945–1963) Socialist Federal Republic of Yugoslavia (1963–1992) Consisted of the Socialist Republics of: Slovenia (1945–1991); Croatia (1945–1991); Bosnia and Herzegovina (1945–1992) Serbia (1945–1992) (included the autonomous provinces of Vojvodina and Kosovo) Montenegro (1945–1992); Macedonia (1945–1991) See also: Free Territory of Trieste (1947–1954)^{h}			Republic of Croatia^{b} Croatian War of Independence			
Slavonia	Part of Austria-Hungary including the Bay of Kotor See also: Kingdom of Croatia-Slavonia (1868–1918) Kingdom of Dalmatia (1815–1918) Condominium of Bosnia and Herzegovina (1878–1918)	State of Slovenes, Croats and Serbs (1918) Kingdom of Serbs, Croats and Slovenes (1918–1929) Kingdom of Yugoslavia (1929–1943) See also: Republic of Prekmurje (1919) Banat, Bačka and Baranja (1918–1919) Free State of Fiume (1920–1924) (1924–1945) Italian province of Zadar (1920–1947)		Independent State of Croatia (1941–1945) Puppet state of Germany. Parts annexed by Italy. Međimurje and Baranja annexed by Hungary.	Democratic Federal Yugoslavia (1943–1945) Federal People's Republic of Yugoslavia (1945–1963) Socialist Federal Republic of Yugoslavia (1963–1992) Consisted of the Socialist Republics of: Slovenia (1945–1991); Croatia (1945–1991); Bosnia and Herzegovina (1945–1992) Serbia (1945–1992) (included the autonomous provinces of Vojvodina and Kosovo) Montenegro (1945–1992); Macedonia (1945–1991) See also: Free Territory of Trieste (1947–1954)^{h}			Republic of Croatia^{b} Croatian War of Independence			
Croatia	Part of Austria-Hungary including the Bay of Kotor See also: Kingdom of Croatia-Slavonia (1868–1918) Kingdom of Dalmatia (1815–1918) Condominium of Bosnia and Herzegovina (1878–1918)	State of Slovenes, Croats and Serbs (1918) Kingdom of Serbs, Croats and Slovenes (1918–1929) Kingdom of Yugoslavia (1929–1943) See also: Republic of Prekmurje (1919) Banat, Bačka and Baranja (1918–1919) Free State of Fiume (1920–1924) (1924–1945) Italian province of Zadar (1920–1947)		Independent State of Croatia (1941–1945) Puppet state of Germany. Parts annexed by Italy. Međimurje and Baranja annexed by Hungary.	Democratic Federal Yugoslavia (1943–1945) Federal People's Republic of Yugoslavia (1945–1963) Socialist Federal Republic of Yugoslavia (1963–1992) Consisted of the Socialist Republics of: Slovenia (1945–1991); Croatia (1945–1991); Bosnia and Herzegovina (1945–1992) Serbia (1945–1992) (included the autonomous provinces of Vojvodina and Kosovo) Montenegro (1945–1992); Macedonia (1945–1991) See also: Free Territory of Trieste (1947–1954)^{h}			Republic of Croatia^{b} Croatian War of Independence			
Bosnia	Part of Austria-Hungary including the Bay of Kotor See also: Kingdom of Croatia-Slavonia (1868–1918) Kingdom of Dalmatia (1815–1918) Condominium of Bosnia and Herzegovina (1878–1918)	State of Slovenes, Croats and Serbs (1918) Kingdom of Serbs, Croats and Slovenes (1918–1929) Kingdom of Yugoslavia (1929–1943) See also: Republic of Prekmurje (1919) Banat, Bačka and Baranja (1918–1919) Free State of Fiume (1920–1924) (1924–1945) Italian province of Zadar (1920–1947)		Independent State of Croatia (1941–1945) Puppet state of Germany. Parts annexed by Italy. Međimurje and Baranja annexed by Hungary.	Democratic Federal Yugoslavia (1943–1945) Federal People's Republic of Yugoslavia (1945–1963) Socialist Federal Republic of Yugoslavia (1963–1992) Consisted of the Socialist Republics of: Slovenia (1945–1991); Croatia (1945–1991); Bosnia and Herzegovina (1945–1992) Serbia (1945–1992) (included the autonomous provinces of Vojvodina and Kosovo) Montenegro (1945–1992); Macedonia (1945–1991) See also: Free Territory of Trieste (1947–1954)^{h}			Bosnia and Herzegovina^{c} Bosnian War Consists of the Federation of Bosnia and Herzegovina (since 1995), Republika Srpska (since 1995), and Brčko District (since 2000).			
Herzegovina	Part of Austria-Hungary including the Bay of Kotor See also: Kingdom of Croatia-Slavonia (1868–1918) Kingdom of Dalmatia (1815–1918) Condominium of Bosnia and Herzegovina (1878–1918)	State of Slovenes, Croats and Serbs (1918) Kingdom of Serbs, Croats and Slovenes (1918–1929) Kingdom of Yugoslavia (1929–1943) See also: Republic of Prekmurje (1919) Banat, Bačka and Baranja (1918–1919) Free State of Fiume (1920–1924) (1924–1945) Italian province of Zadar (1920–1947)		Independent State of Croatia (1941–1945) Puppet state of Germany. Parts annexed by Italy. Međimurje and Baranja annexed by Hungary.	Democratic Federal Yugoslavia (1943–1945) Federal People's Republic of Yugoslavia (1945–1963) Socialist Federal Republic of Yugoslavia (1963–1992) Consisted of the Socialist Republics of: Slovenia (1945–1991); Croatia (1945–1991); Bosnia and Herzegovina (1945–1992) Serbia (1945–1992) (included the autonomous provinces of Vojvodina and Kosovo) Montenegro (1945–1992); Macedonia (1945–1991) See also: Free Territory of Trieste (1947–1954)^{h}			Bosnia and Herzegovina^{c} Bosnian War Consists of the Federation of Bosnia and Herzegovina (since 1995), Republika Srpska (since 1995), and Brčko District (since 2000).			
Vojvodina	Part of the Délvidék region of Hungary	State of Slovenes, Croats and Serbs (1918) Kingdom of Serbs, Croats and Slovenes (1918–1929) Kingdom of Yugoslavia (1929–1943) See also: Republic of Prekmurje (1919) Banat, Bačka and Baranja (1918–1919) Free State of Fiume (1920–1924) (1924–1945) Italian province of Zadar (1920–1947)		Autonomous Banat^{d} (part of the German; Territory of the Military Commander in Serbia)	Democratic Federal Yugoslavia (1943–1945) Federal People's Republic of Yugoslavia (1945–1963) Socialist Federal Republic of Yugoslavia (1963–1992) Consisted of the Socialist Republics of: Slovenia (1945–1991); Croatia (1945–1991); Bosnia and Herzegovina (1945–1992) Serbia (1945–1992) (included the autonomous provinces of Vojvodina and Kosovo) Montenegro (1945–1992); Macedonia (1945–1991) See also: Free Territory of Trieste (1947–1954)^{h}			Federal Republic of Yugoslavia Consisted of the Republic of Serbia (1992–2006) and Republic of Montenegro (1992–2006) Included Kosovo and Metohija, under UN administration, without control since 1999	State Union of Serbia and Montenegro Included Kosovo, under UN administration	Republic of Serbia Included the autonomous provinces of Vojvodina and Kosovo and Metohija under UN administration	Republic of Serbia Includes the autonomous province of Vojvodina; Kosovo claim
Central Serbia	Kingdom of Serbia (1882–1918)	State of Slovenes, Croats and Serbs (1918) Kingdom of Serbs, Croats and Slovenes (1918–1929) Kingdom of Yugoslavia (1929–1943) See also: Republic of Prekmurje (1919) Banat, Bačka and Baranja (1918–1919) Free State of Fiume (1920–1924) (1924–1945) Italian province of Zadar (1920–1947)		Territory of the Military Commander in Serbia (1941–1944) ^{e}	Democratic Federal Yugoslavia (1943–1945) Federal People's Republic of Yugoslavia (1945–1963) Socialist Federal Republic of Yugoslavia (1963–1992) Consisted of the Socialist Republics of: Slovenia (1945–1991); Croatia (1945–1991); Bosnia and Herzegovina (1945–1992) Serbia (1945–1992) (included the autonomous provinces of Vojvodina and Kosovo) Montenegro (1945–1992); Macedonia (1945–1991) See also: Free Territory of Trieste (1947–1954)^{h}			Federal Republic of Yugoslavia Consisted of the Republic of Serbia (1992–2006) and Republic of Montenegro (1992–2006) Included Kosovo and Metohija, under UN administration, without control since 1999	State Union of Serbia and Montenegro Included Kosovo, under UN administration	Republic of Serbia Included the autonomous provinces of Vojvodina and Kosovo and Metohija under UN administration	Republic of Serbia Includes the autonomous province of Vojvodina; Kosovo claim
Kosovo	Part of the Kingdom of Serbia (1912–1918)	State of Slovenes, Croats and Serbs (1918) Kingdom of Serbs, Croats and Slovenes (1918–1929) Kingdom of Yugoslavia (1929–1943) See also: Republic of Prekmurje (1919) Banat, Bačka and Baranja (1918–1919) Free State of Fiume (1920–1924) (1924–1945) Italian province of Zadar (1920–1947)		Mostly annexed by Italian Albania (1941–1944) along with western Macedonia and south-eastern Montenegro	Democratic Federal Yugoslavia (1943–1945) Federal People's Republic of Yugoslavia (1945–1963) Socialist Federal Republic of Yugoslavia (1963–1992) Consisted of the Socialist Republics of: Slovenia (1945–1991); Croatia (1945–1991); Bosnia and Herzegovina (1945–1992) Serbia (1945–1992) (included the autonomous provinces of Vojvodina and Kosovo) Montenegro (1945–1992); Macedonia (1945–1991) See also: Free Territory of Trieste (1947–1954)^{h}			Federal Republic of Yugoslavia Consisted of the Republic of Serbia (1992–2006) and Republic of Montenegro (1992–2006) Included Kosovo and Metohija, under UN administration, without control since 1999	State Union of Serbia and Montenegro Included Kosovo, under UN administration	Republic of Serbia Included the autonomous provinces of Vojvodina and Kosovo and Metohija under UN administration	Republic of Kosovo
Metohija	Kingdom of Montenegro (1910–1918) Metohija controlled by Austria-Hungary 1915–1918	State of Slovenes, Croats and Serbs (1918) Kingdom of Serbs, Croats and Slovenes (1918–1929) Kingdom of Yugoslavia (1929–1943) See also: Republic of Prekmurje (1919) Banat, Bačka and Baranja (1918–1919) Free State of Fiume (1920–1924) (1924–1945) Italian province of Zadar (1920–1947)		Mostly annexed by Italian Albania (1941–1944) along with western Macedonia and south-eastern Montenegro	Democratic Federal Yugoslavia (1943–1945) Federal People's Republic of Yugoslavia (1945–1963) Socialist Federal Republic of Yugoslavia (1963–1992) Consisted of the Socialist Republics of: Slovenia (1945–1991); Croatia (1945–1991); Bosnia and Herzegovina (1945–1992) Serbia (1945–1992) (included the autonomous provinces of Vojvodina and Kosovo) Montenegro (1945–1992); Macedonia (1945–1991) See also: Free Territory of Trieste (1947–1954)^{h}			Federal Republic of Yugoslavia Consisted of the Republic of Serbia (1992–2006) and Republic of Montenegro (1992–2006) Included Kosovo and Metohija, under UN administration, without control since 1999	State Union of Serbia and Montenegro Included Kosovo, under UN administration	Republic of Serbia Included the autonomous provinces of Vojvodina and Kosovo and Metohija under UN administration	Republic of Kosovo
Montenegro and Brda	Kingdom of Montenegro (1910–1918) Metohija controlled by Austria-Hungary 1915–1918	State of Slovenes, Croats and Serbs (1918) Kingdom of Serbs, Croats and Slovenes (1918–1929) Kingdom of Yugoslavia (1929–1943) See also: Republic of Prekmurje (1919) Banat, Bačka and Baranja (1918–1919) Free State of Fiume (1920–1924) (1924–1945) Italian province of Zadar (1920–1947)		Protectorate of Montenegro^{f} (1941–1944)	Democratic Federal Yugoslavia (1943–1945) Federal People's Republic of Yugoslavia (1945–1963) Socialist Federal Republic of Yugoslavia (1963–1992) Consisted of the Socialist Republics of: Slovenia (1945–1991); Croatia (1945–1991); Bosnia and Herzegovina (1945–1992) Serbia (1945–1992) (included the autonomous provinces of Vojvodina and Kosovo) Montenegro (1945–1992); Macedonia (1945–1991) See also: Free Territory of Trieste (1947–1954)^{h}			Federal Republic of Yugoslavia Consisted of the Republic of Serbia (1992–2006) and Republic of Montenegro (1992–2006) Included Kosovo and Metohija, under UN administration, without control since 1999	State Union of Serbia and Montenegro Included Kosovo, under UN administration	Montenegro	
Vardar Macedonia	Part of the Kingdom of Serbia (1912–1918)	State of Slovenes, Croats and Serbs (1918) Kingdom of Serbs, Croats and Slovenes (1918–1929) Kingdom of Yugoslavia (1929–1943) See also: Republic of Prekmurje (1919) Banat, Bačka and Baranja (1918–1919) Free State of Fiume (1920–1924) (1924–1945) Italian province of Zadar (1920–1947)		Annexed by the Kingdom of Bulgaria (1941–1944)	Democratic Federal Yugoslavia (1943–1945) Federal People's Republic of Yugoslavia (1945–1963) Socialist Federal Republic of Yugoslavia (1963–1992) Consisted of the Socialist Republics of: Slovenia (1945–1991); Croatia (1945–1991); Bosnia and Herzegovina (1945–1992) Serbia (1945–1992) (included the autonomous provinces of Vojvodina and Kosovo) Montenegro (1945–1992); Macedonia (1945–1991) See also: Free Territory of Trieste (1947–1954)^{h}			Republic of North Macedonia^{g}			
^{a} Prekmurje annexed by Hungary.; ^{b} See also: SAO Kninska Krajina (1990) → SAO Krajina (1990–1991); and SAO Eastern Slavonia, Baranja and Western Syrmia (1990–1991), SAO Western Slavonia (1990–1991) and the Republic of Serbian Krajina (1990–1995), all replaced by the UN Transitional Administration for Eastern Slavonia, Baranja and Western Sirmium (1996–1998).; ^{c} See also: Republic of Bosnia and Herzegovina; Croatian Republic of Herzeg-Bosnia; and the Serbian Autonomous Oblasts (SAOs) of Bosanska Krajina, North-East Bosnia, Romanija and Herzegovina (1991–1992), which all combined to form the Serbian Republic of Bosnia and Herzegovina (1992–1995).; ^{d} Bačka was reannexed by Hungary (1941–1944), while Syrmia was annexed by the Independent State of Croatia (1941–1944).; ^{e} Including North Kosovo. See also: Republic of Užice.; ^{f} Annexed by Italy (1941–1943) and Germany (1943–1944). Smaller part annexed by the Independent State of Croatia (1941–1944).; ^{g} North Macedonia's official and constitutional name was the Republic of Macedonia until 2019. It was known in the United Nations as the former Yugoslav Republic of Macedonia because of a naming dispute with Greece.; ^{h} Free Territory was established in 1947. Its administration was divided into two areas (Zone A) and (Zone B). Free Territory was de facto taken over by Italy and SFRY in 1954.
