= Krsmanović House, Terazije =

Krsmanović's House at Terazije
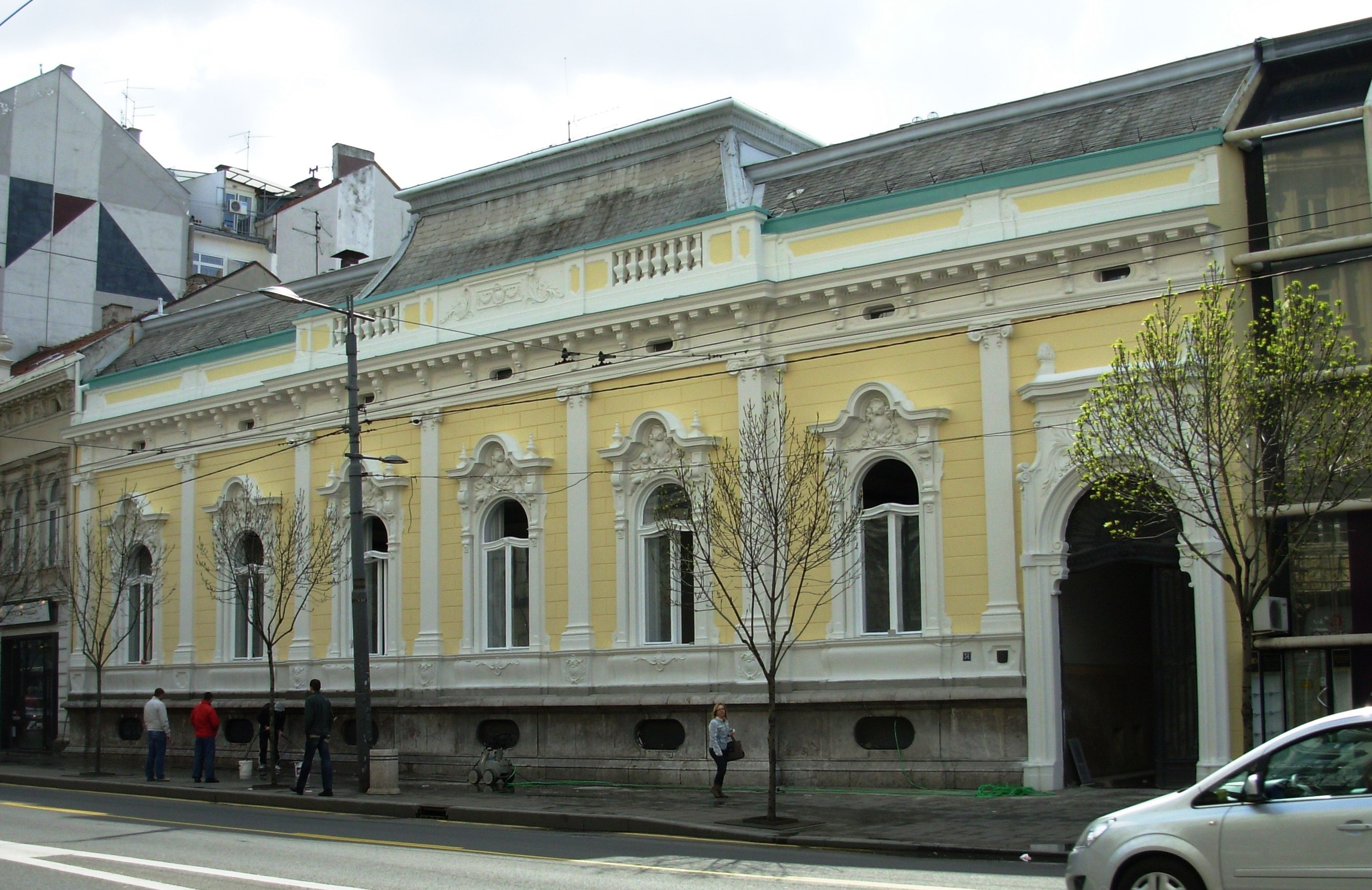

General information
- Location: Belgrade, Serbia, 34 Terazije Street
- Coordinates: 44.8117°N 20.4615°E
- Opened: 1885

Height
- Architectural: Academic art or Neo-Baroque

Design and construction
- Architect: Jovan Ilkić
- Known for: House of Alexander Karađorđević, Prince Regent of Yugoslavia

Krsmanović's House (Serbian: Крсмановићева кућа), situated at 34 Terazije Street in Belgrade, was built in 1885 for a merchant. In 1918, it became the house of Alexander Karađorđević, Prince Regent of Yugoslavia and was used as a theatre before it became public property after World War II. It has served as the Protocol building of the Ministry of Foreign Affairs. The Academic art house is considered among the best designs of the architect Jovan Ilkić.

It was registered as a cultural monument of Serbia in 1981 by the Zavoda za zaštitu spomenika spomenika kulture grada Beograda, or Institute for the Protection of Cultural Monuments. It was restored in 1987.

== History ==
Architect Jovan Ilkić designed the Neo-Baroque or Academic art-style house for Marko O. Marković, a merchant, and his family. Unable to afford the house due to Marković's debts, the house was surrendered and bought by Krsmanović brothers in 1898, and became the property of Aleksa Krsmanović, who lived in it until he died in 1914. The house and property were bequeathed to the Serbian people, through the A. Krsmanović endowment, with stipulation that his wife was to live in the house until her death.

The Royal Palace was damaged during the First World War, and between 1918 and 1922, the house served as the residence of Aleksandar Karađorđević and the Court of the Kingdom of Serbia. On 1 December 1918, the document was signed that created the Kingdom of Serbs, Croats and Slovenes, after which he gave a speech from the house to people of Belgrade. Then, the house was managed by an endowment to be used to generate for orphanages for children, because the Krsmanovićs had not had children. Portions of the building were used for several purposes by organizations and retailers—inhabitants included an "exclusive" oriental carpet retailer and an Automobile Club. After 1930, the "Claridge" occupied the house, and later on, for some time, the Theatre of Brana Cvetković.

During World War II, the Germans used the house as a canteen. After the war the house was nationalized. It was used as a youth center, bank and diplomatic club. For three decades, until 1979, it served as the Protocol building of the Ministry of Foreign Affairs. Today, several companies are headquartered in the building.

== Architecture ==
The house was once described as "a small neo-baroque castle and one of the most beautiful monuments of this type in Serbia." It sits on a slope, with a base of 30 metres, with the street side of the building on high ground, and the back of the house is two floors, with the access to the garden. The courtyard facade was accentuated by a curved double flight of stairs descending from a semi-circular terrace. Based on the architectural composition, internal disposition, artistic shape and craftsmanship, it is among Ilkić's best works.

== Gallery ==
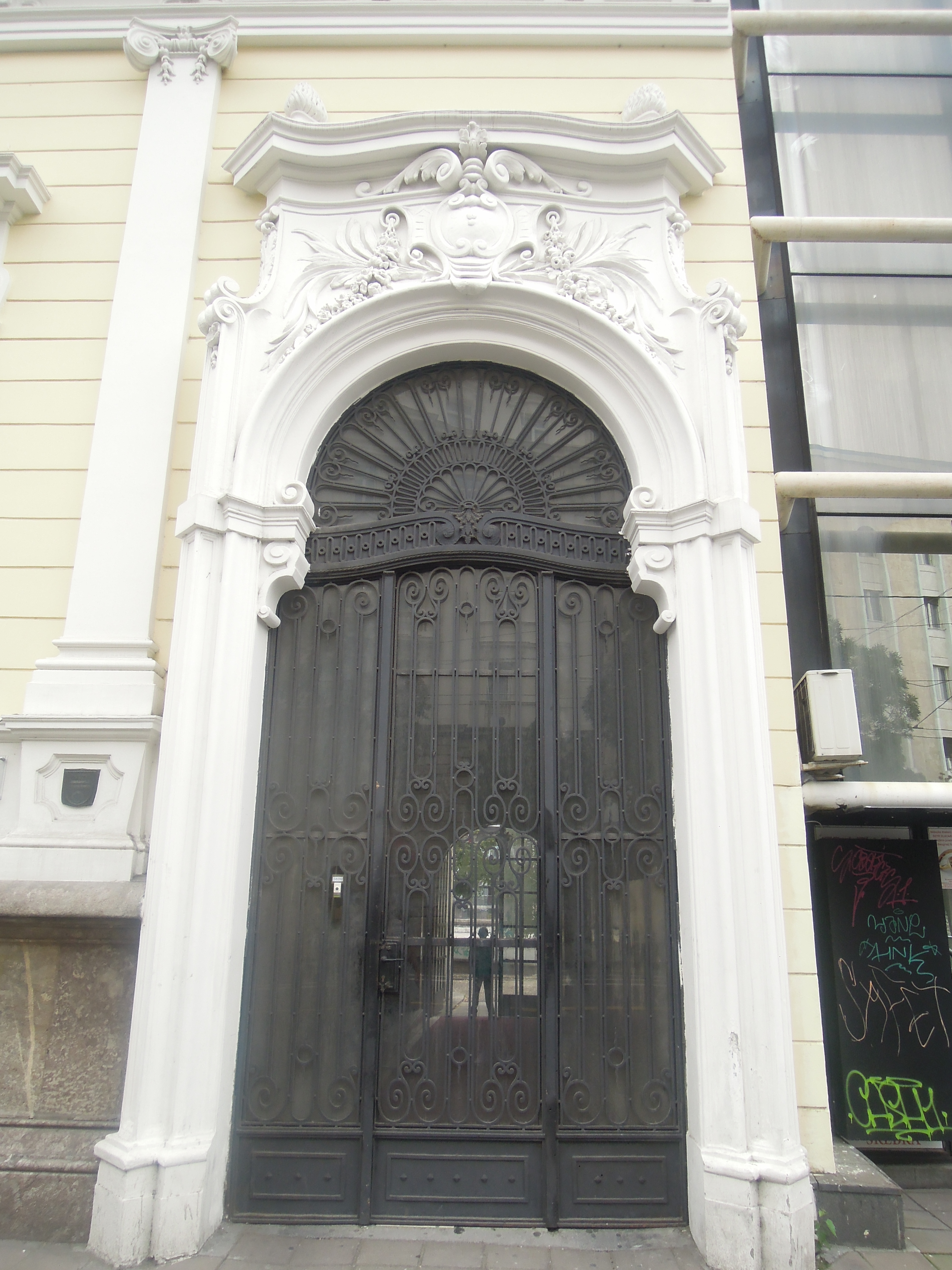

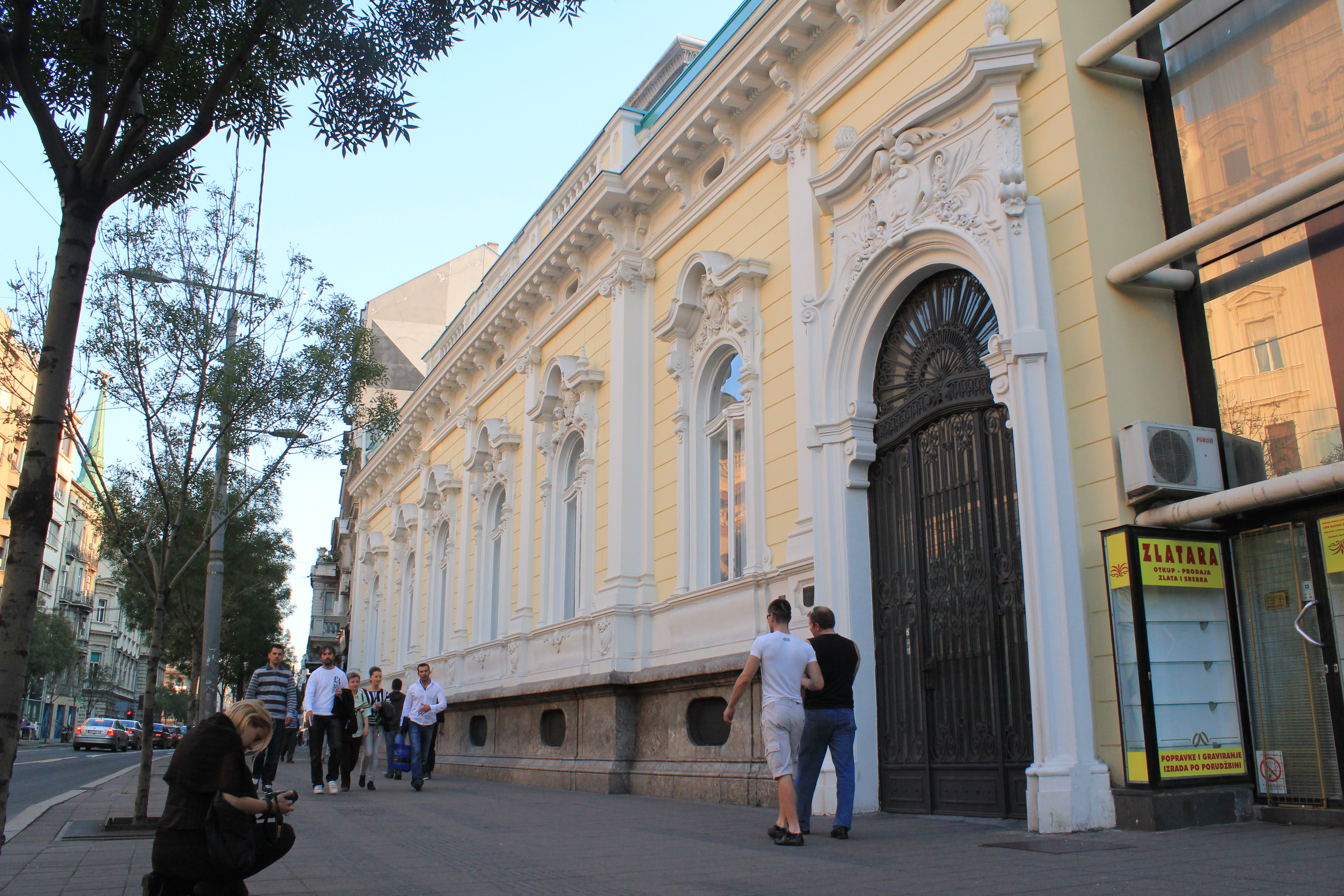

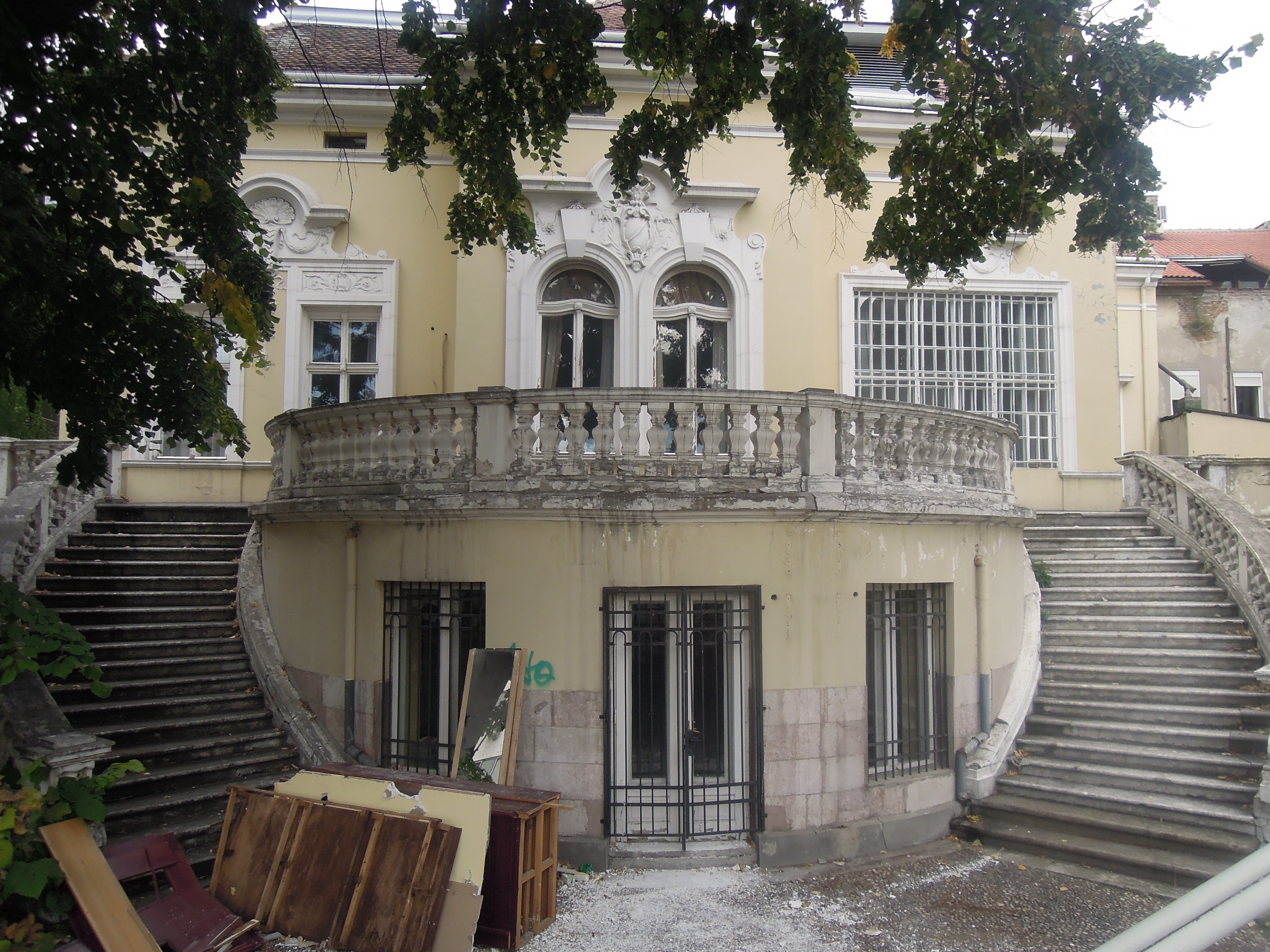

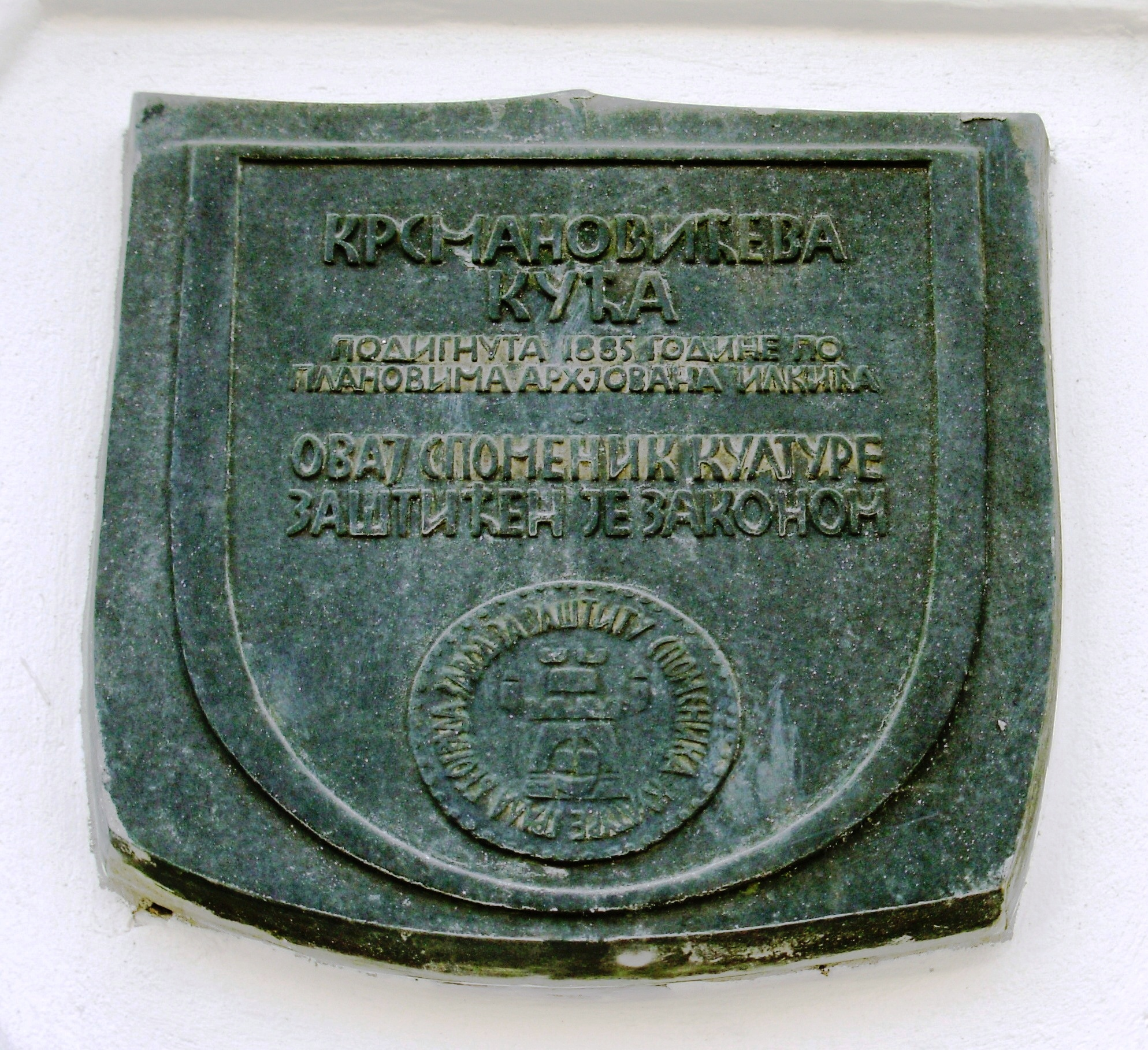

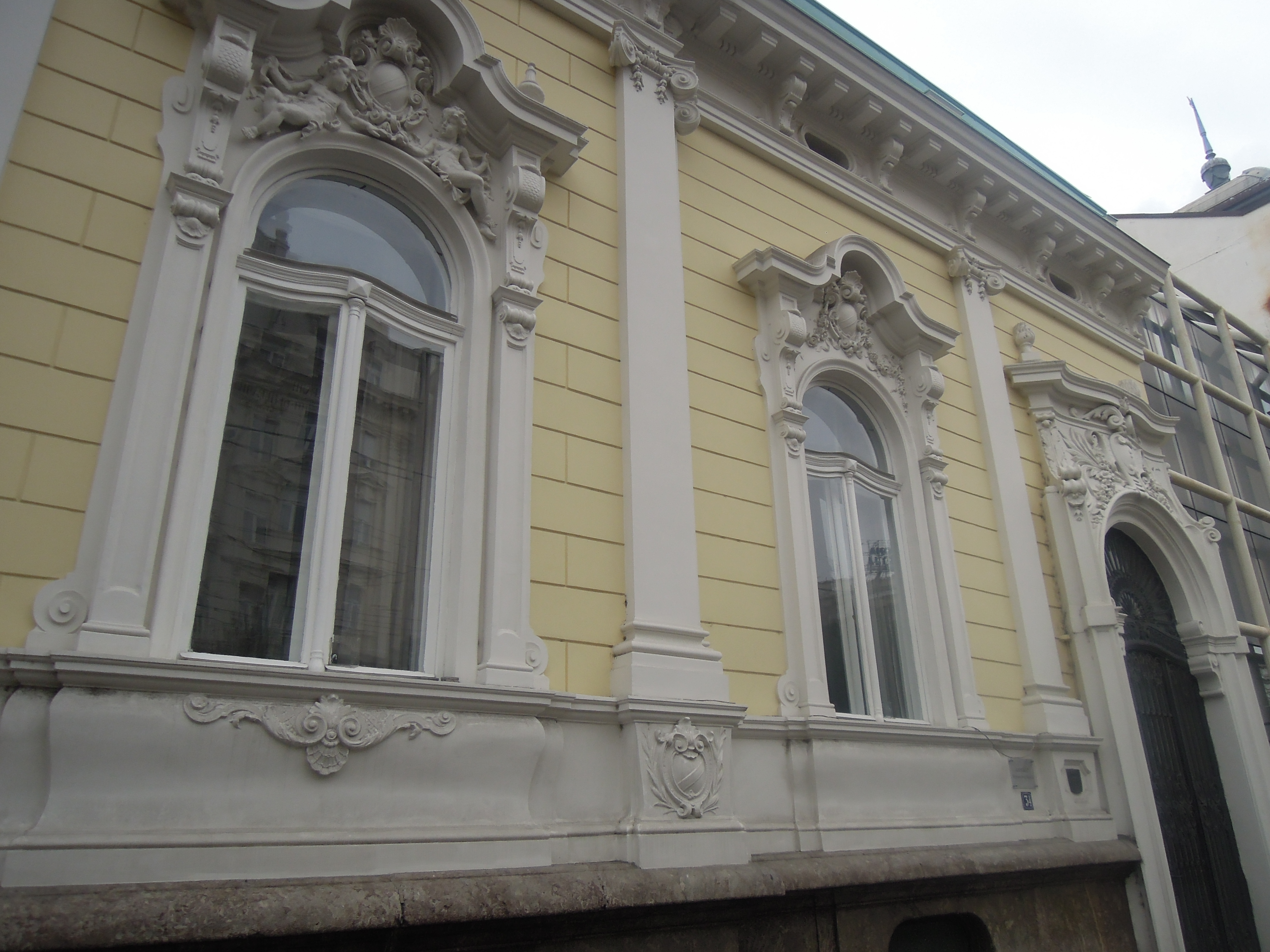

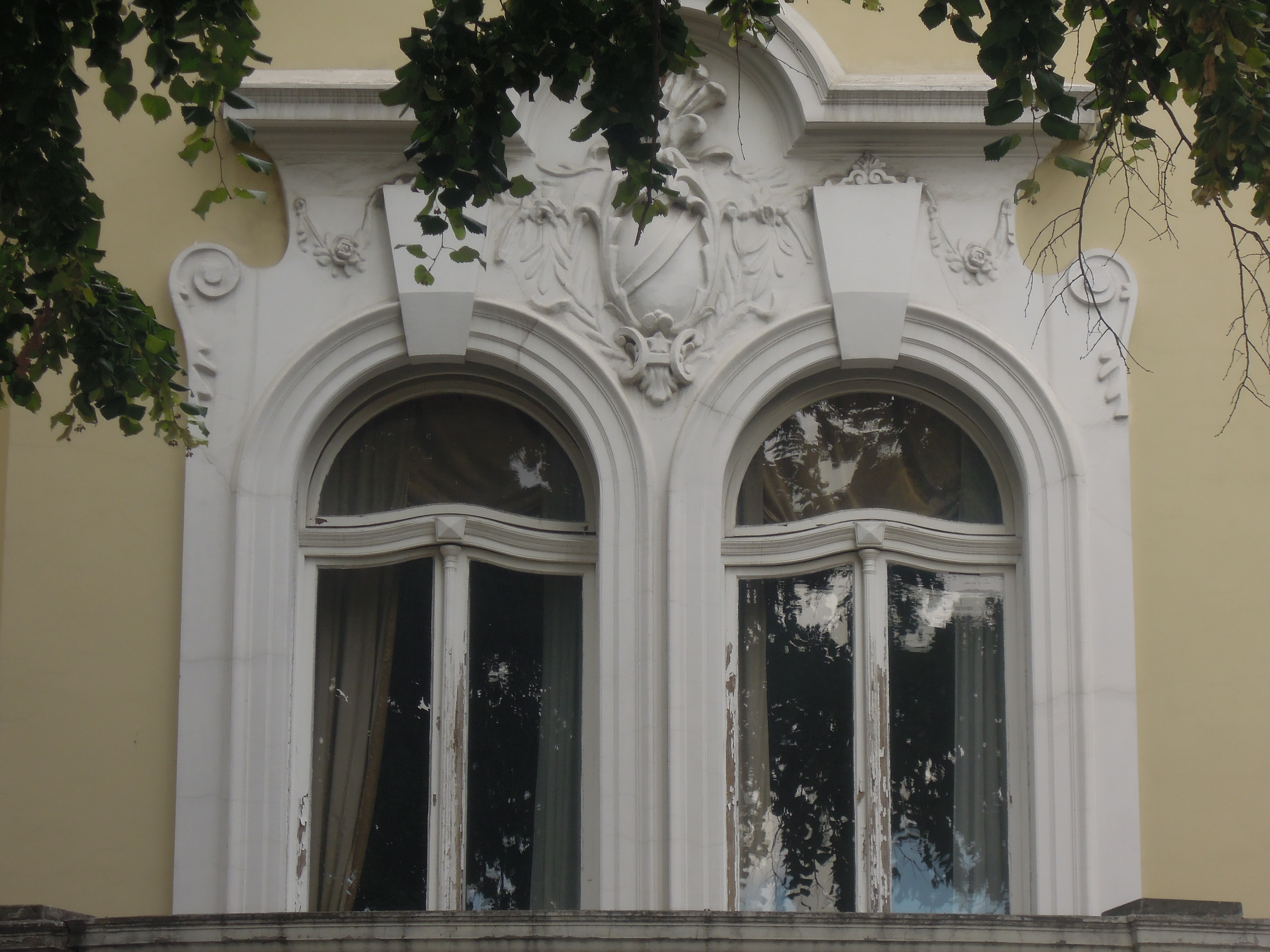

== See more ==
- List of cultural monuments in Belgrade
- Јоvan Ilkić
