= Srđa Pavlović =

Montenegrin and Serbian historian

Srdja Pavlović
- Srđa Pavlović
- Born: Montenegro, Yugoslavia
- Citizenship: Canada
- Known for: Balkan Anschluss: The Annexation of Montenegro and the Creation of the Common South Slavic State (2008)
- Scientific career
- Fields: modern European and Balkan history, focus on political and cultural history of the South Slavs
- Workplaces: University of Alberta (earlier, Grant MacEwan University, Portage College)

Srdja Pavlović, also Srđa Pavlović, is a Montenegrin historian. He was born in and educated in Montenegro, but left his homecountry to continue education around the world. He currently teaches in Canada. He specialized in the modern European and Balkan history, with a main focus of research in the field of political and cultural history of the South Slavs during the 19th and 20th centuries.

== Early life and education ==
He was born in SR Montenegro, and finished his early education there. He left for continuation of his education elsewhere, namely in Serbia, Mongolia, Great Britain, eventually finishing it in Canada, where he currently lives and works. Specializing in the modern European and Balkan history, his research main focus is in the field of political and cultural history of the South Slavs during the 19th and 20th centuries.

== Career ==
He is currently adjunct professor at the Department of History and Classics, University of Alberta, where he is research associate at Wirth Institute for Austrian and Central European Studies. Pavlović specialized in the modern European and Balkan history, with political and cultural history of the South Slavs during the 19th and 20th centuries being his main field of research. Previously, he also taught at Grant MacEwan University, and at the Portage College. Besides his college and university teachings, Pavlović is also a researcher, supervisor, editor, and literary translator.

He co-founded Spaces of Identity, where he works as co-editor. This is a multidisciplinary international web-journal dedicated to issues of tradition, cultural boundaries and identity formation in Central and Eastern Europe. In 2017, he signed the Declaration on the Common Language of the Croats, Serbs, Bosniaks and Montenegrins. He is also an associate editor of Nationality Papers at Columbia University, and Treaties and Documents at University of Maribor.

Pavlović is coordinator of the research projects Direct Democracy and Active Citizenship: Case Study of Bosnia and Herzegovina for North America.

== Political views and engagements ==
Dr. Pavlović was the founding member of Movement for Changes (PzP), the Montenegrin political party, and was also the member of the Advisory Councils for Democratic Front (DF), a political coalition in Montenegro.

== Published works ==
Beside authoring articles in various peer-reviewed journals worldwide, Pavlović has written historical monographs in English and Serbo-Croatian languages, such as:

- Balkan Anschluss: The Annexation of Montenegro and the Creation of the Common South Slavic State (2008);
- Prostori Identiteta: Eseji o Istoriji, Sjećanju i Interpretacijama Prošlosti (2006);
- Iza Ogledala: Eseji o Politici Identiteta (2004);
- Zapadna Ljuljaška (1997);
- Mongolski Piktogram (1989).

He edited scholarly collections and literary anthologies such as:

- Transcending Fratricide: Political Myths, Reconciliations and the Uncertain Future in the former Yugoslavia (2013);
- Treshold: Anthology of Contemporary Writing from Alberta (1998).

== See also ==
- Marko Attila Hoare
