= Josip Torbar =

Josip Torbar may refer to:

- Josip Torbar (scientist) (1824–1900), Croatian natural scientist, educator and politician, uncle of Josip Torbar born in 1889
- Josip Torbar (politician, born 1889), Croatian politician, father of Josip Torbar born in 1922
- Josip Torbar (politician, born 1922), Croatian politician
