= Boj =

Boj or BOJ may refer to:

- Boj (beverage), a popular fermented beverage in Guatemala
- Bank of Japan, central bank of Japan
- Boj (Slovenia), Yugoslav nationalist organization
- Boj (TV series), animated television series
- BOJ (musician), English-Nigerian musician
- BOJ, IATA code for Burgas Airport in Bulgaria
- boj, ISO 639 code for Anjam language of Papua New Guinea
- Boj, Hungarian name of Boiu, Rapoltu Mare, Romania
