= Organization of Yugoslav Nationalists =

Political organisation in Yugoslavia, 1921–1929

Organisation of Yugoslav Nationalists Organizacija jugoslavenskih nacionalista Организација jугословенских nационалиста
- Leader: Marko Nani; Ivo Petković; Ljubo Leontić; Miodrag Dimitrijević
- Founded: 1921
- Dissolved: 1929
- Headquarters: Split (1921–1927); Belgrade (1927–1929)
- Newspaper: Pobeda
- Youth wing: Young Yugoslavia
- Armed wing: Action Groups
- Ideology: Fascism; Yugoslavism; Anti-communism; Antisemitism

The Organisation of Yugoslav Nationalists (Croatian: Organizacija jugoslavenskih nacionalista, Serbian: Организација југословенских националиста), acronymised as ORJUNA or Orjuna, was a proto-fascist, anti-communist, terrorist, and Yugoslavist nationalist organisation established in 1921 in the Kingdom of Serbs, Croats and Slovenes.

Initially named the Yugoslav Progressive Nationalist Youth, it was founded on the initiative of the Democratic Party for extralegal suppression of political enemies—communists, political parties deemed separatist, proponents of a federal Yugoslavia, and ethnic minorities considered enemies of the state. Those included the Communist Party of Yugoslavia; the Croatian Peasant Party-dominated Croatian Bloc, the Slovene People's Party, the Džemijet, and the Yugoslav Muslim Organization, as well as minorities suspected to be enemies of the state, namely the Hungarians, the Volksdeutsche, and the Jews.

When founded, the organisation received political support from the government, especially the Democratic Party faction loyal to Svetozar Pribićević, and funding from the government budget. In 1925, at the peak of its power, ORJUNA had more than 300 local chapters organised in seven districts nationwide. Up to 40,000 members, including 10,000 belonging to its paramilitary wing, the Action Groups. Organisationally, they resembled the Italian fascist Blackshirts. ORJUNA glorified and used violence to achieve its objectives. The organisation rejected parliamentarism in favour of a dictatorship.

ORJUNA's activities led to the establishment of rival organisations. In 1922, the Croatian Party of Rights established the Croatian National Youth (HANAO), and the People's Radical Party founded the Serbian National Youth (SRNAO)—the former ostensibly to hold ORJUNA's actions in check, and the latter based on the belief that ORJUNA was inadequate for full realisation of Serbian interests. The situation produced frequent, often armed, clashes with HANAO, SRNAO, and communists.

After Pribićević split from the Democratic Party and moved to the opposition, ORJUNA gradually weakened. The leadership became divided in 1928 when Split district leaders and Pribićević accused the ORJUNA organisations in Vojvodina and Serbia of espousing the Greater Serbian agenda. The organisation was disbanded when the royal dictatorship took power in 1929.

== Background ==
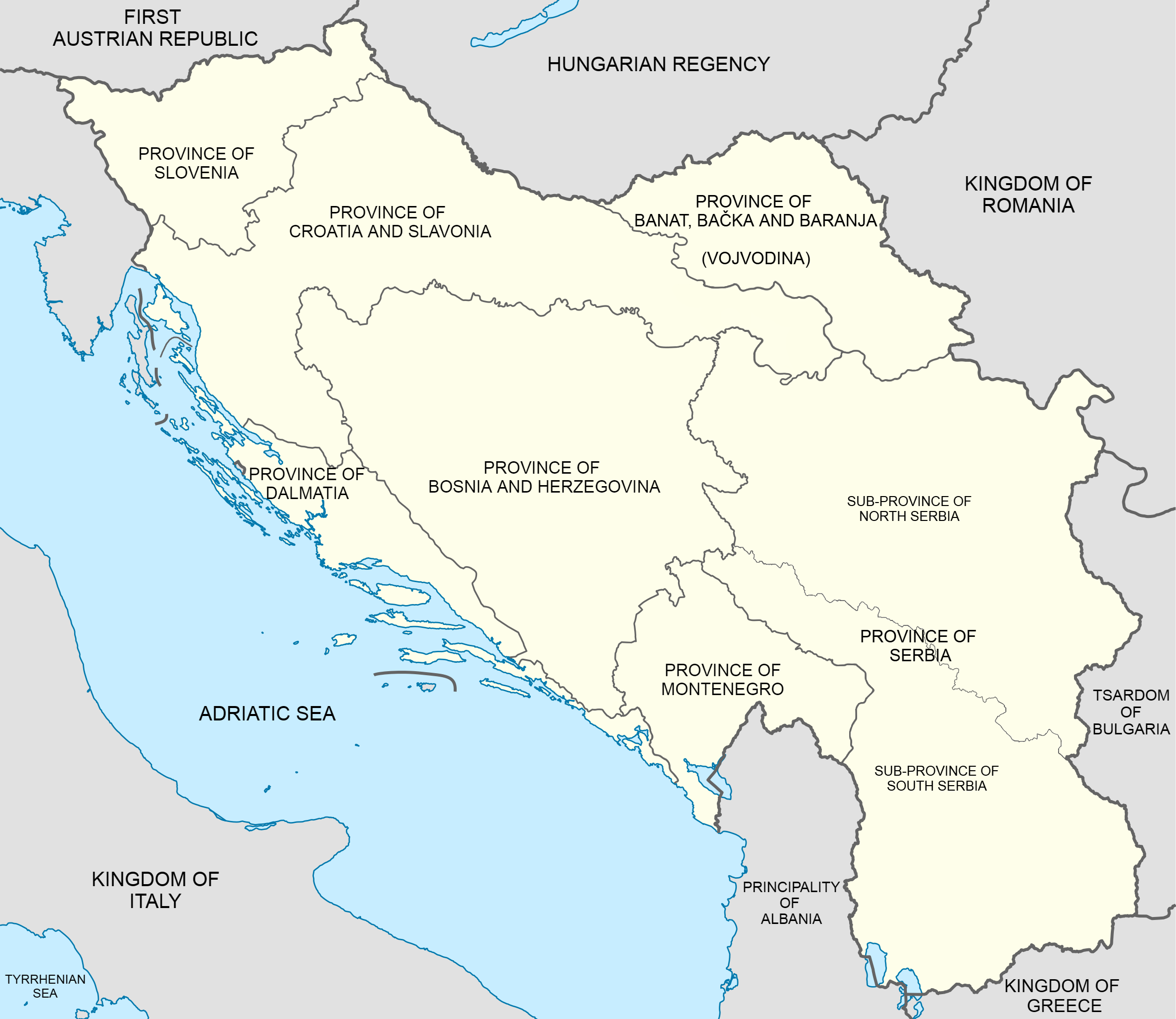
Provinces of the Kingdom of Serbs, Croats and Slovenes in 1918–1922

Following the conclusion of World War I, the Kingdom of Serbs, Croats and Slovenes (later renamed Yugoslavia) was proclaimed by the Prince Regent Alexander on 1 December 1918. The Prince Regent appointed a government, and the Temporary National Representation was established (largely appointed) as an interim parliament. The Temporary National Representation was meant to enact electoral law for the future Constitutional Assembly.

By the time of the proclamation of Yugoslavia, the state's system of government was largely undecided. Representatives of the Kingdom of Serbia and the Yugoslav Committee, an ad hoc group claiming it represented the South Slavs living in Austria-Hungary, had agreed in the 1917 Corfu Declaration that Yugoslavia would be a monarchy with the House of Karađorđević as its head. Still, the level of centralisation was left to be decided later on. In November 1918, representatives of the Yugoslav Committee joined by the National Council of Slovenes, Croats and Serbs negotiated with the representatives of Serbia on the matter and produced the Geneva Declaration, an agreement that Yugoslavia would be a confederation with limited central government powers. The Serbian government quickly rejected the agreement. The country's constitution was not adopted until June 1921.

At the same time, there was the issue of the Adriatic question, the uncertainty regarding the borders of Yugoslavia. It arose from Italian claims stemming from the 1915 Treaty of London and the Fiume question. It was not addressed until the 1920 Treaty of Rapallo. Regardless, the treaty's terms were not fulfilled immediately. In that context, the Allied occupation of the eastern Adriatic, including the region of Dalmatia, remained in place until September 1921. The threat of Italian imperialism led the political elite in Dalmatia to support unconditional unification of Yugoslavia in 1918 and to act against perceived threats to the state. In particular, this was the result of a negative view of the territorial concessions under the Treaty of Rapallo and apparent Italian reluctance to withdraw troops occupying the areas belonging to Yugoslavia under the treaty.

== Origins ==
The Organisation of Yugoslav Nationalists (acronymised as ORJUNA) is traced to the pre-First World War Yugoslav Nationalist Youth (JNO), which, in turn, emerged from the Croat-Serb Progressive Youth (HSNO). The HSNO pursued the policy of national unity promoted by the Croat-Serb Coalition (HSK) and promoted the evolution of the South Slavic nation as a means for Croats to overcome their unequal position in Austria-Hungary. A portion of the HSNO, disappointed in the HSK's pro-regime policy, split and formed the JNO, abandoning parliamentary political struggle for revolutionary methods.

The JNO espoused the integral Yugoslavist ideology, arguing that the ethnic Serbs, Croats, and Slovenes were the single "three-named people". The concept was based on the cult of the heroic Yugoslav race. The heroic cult was derived from writings of Serbian anthropologist Jovan Cvijić who ascribed South Slavic Übermensch traits (beauty, heroism, democratic spirit, and extreme loyalty to the ideals of national freedom) to the largely Serbian population of the Dinaric Alps. Cvijić also associated the population of the Pannonian Plain in northern and eastern Croatia with an anti-democratic, non-national mentality caused by centuries of foreign rule. The JNO was also influenced by Croatian writer Milan Marjanović who portrayed Greater Serbian and Greater Croatian ideas of Vuk Karadžić and Ante Starčević, respectively, as expressions of unity of the South Slavs. In Marjanović's view, the two differed only in Starčević being an advocate of conservative and feudal ideas, while the Karadžić's position was modern and democratic and, therefore, preferable.

== Establishment ==
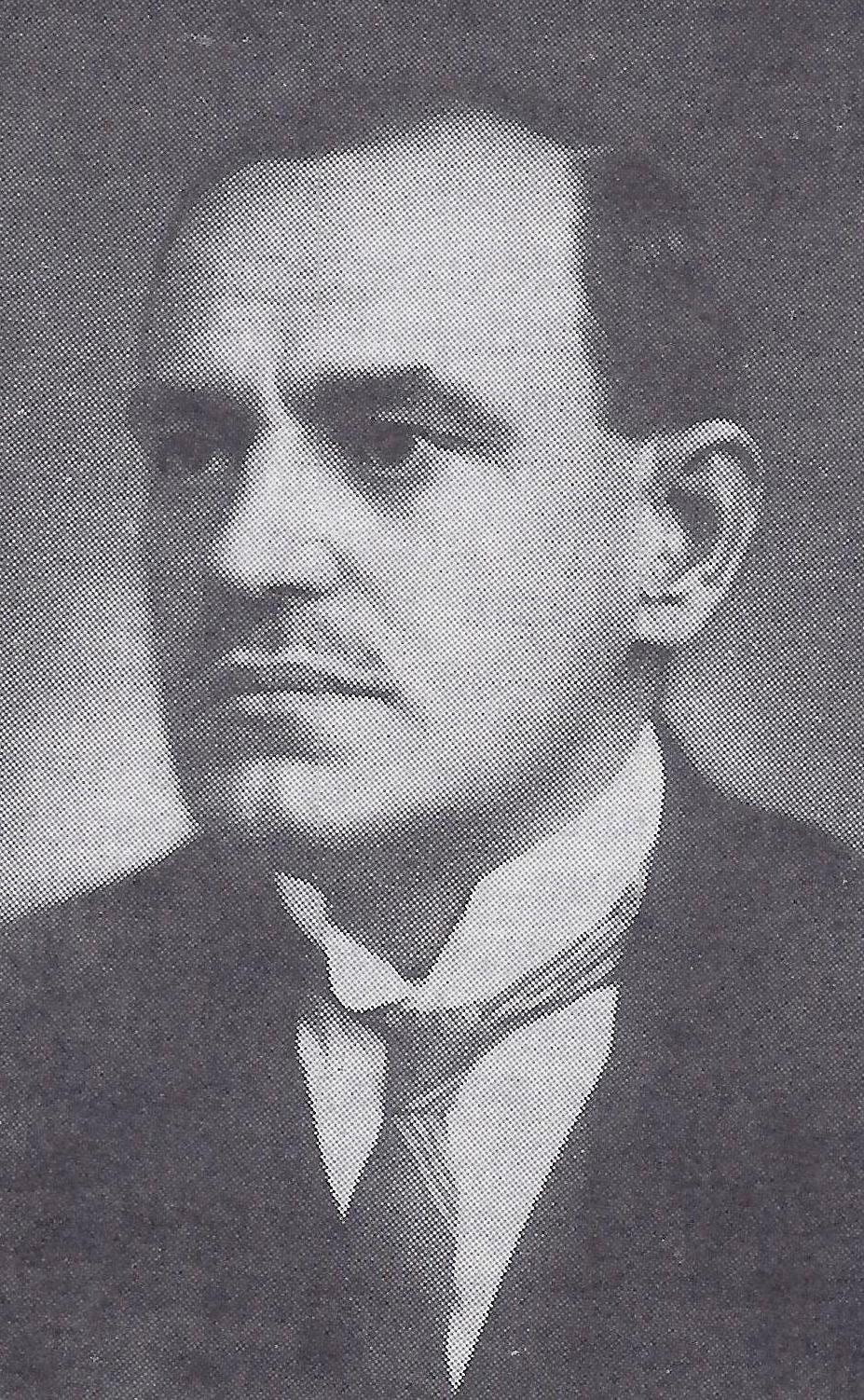
Svetozar Pribićević (pictured) provided ORJUNA government support shortly after its establishment.

The ORJUNA was established in the city of Split on 23 March 1921. It was initially named the Yugoslav Progressive National Youth. The name changed to ORJUNA in May 1922 to reflect an amendment to the organisation's articles, making it no longer an organisation exclusively for youth. The founding assembly, held in the Croatian Sokol movement building, elected Marko Nani as the president and Edo Bulat as the secretary.

The organisation was established on the initiative of the Democratic Party (DS) and its membership primarily consisted of DS members, especially DS members belonging to the faction loyal principally to Svetozar Pribićević. It was established to carry out extralegal suppression of perceived threats to Yugoslavia, i.e., against communists and separatists. In this context, proponents of integral Yugoslavism considered advocates of a federal system of government separatists. While ORJUNA viewed the Croatian nationalism as a separatist threat, it considered the Serbian nationalism a constructive phenomenon because its programme of bringing all Serbs into a single state "would achieve the unification of the South Slavs".

The organisation gained significance only after the HSS-dominated Croatian Bloc coalition was formed in January 1922. The coalition issued a memorandum calling for the reform of Yugoslavia into a federation, and Yugoslav authorities interpreted this as a cause for concern. The following month, the organisation's leaders were received by King Alexander. The central government started funding ORJUNA from the state budget through the Narodna Odbrana organisation and Juraj Demetrović, Croatia's government commissioner.

== Ideology ==
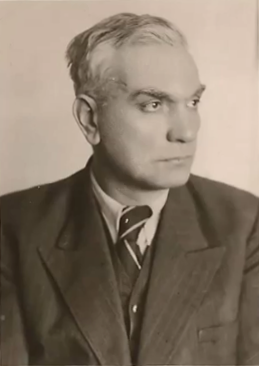
Niko Bartulović (pictured) was an ideologue of ORJUNA.

Like the prewar JNO, ORJUNA adopted integral Yugoslavism as its ideology, closely modelling it after the ideology adopted and promoted by the DS, particularly Pribićević's faction of the Party. Like the DS, ORJUNA supported the idea of the single Yugoslav nation. In addition, ORJUNA modelled its ideology on the example of Italian fascism. The organisation shared several defining characteristics with the Italian fascism such as authoritarianism, anti-clericalism, anti-Communism, use aggressive propaganda, violence and terror, and absolute unity of the state and the people. To this end, ORJUNA advocated subordinating individuals' political and social liberties to the needs of the state, aiming to achieve national unity through paligenetic unitarist revolution and development of corporatist communities.

ORJUNA glorified violence, and regarded Young Bosnia and Gavrilo Princip, who assassinated Archduke Franz Ferdinand, as their role models. Historian Ivo Banac described ORJUNA as an openly terrorist organisation whose members advocated the abolition of parliamentarism in favour of a dictatorship consisting of a corporatist legislature. Due to the absence of radical measures aimed at changing the social structure, historians Roger Griffin and Stanley G. Payne characterised ORJUNA as a proto-fascist organisation.

== Leadership ==
The founding assembly elected 11 members of the organisation's action committee. The action committee was restructured as the central committee soon after, and Ivo Petković replaced Nani as the president. In 1922, ORJUNA's central committee was expanded to 30 members. In November 1922, the seven-member Directory was established as the organisation's main executive body. The first president of the Directory was writer Mirko Korolija. In 1923, new leadership was elected—Ljubo Leontić and Niko Bartulović as the president and the vice president of the Directory. Bartulović was deemed the organisation's main ideologue. The Directory was abolished and the General Secretariat created as ORJUNA's new main body in 1927, and Miodrag Dimitrijević was elected the general secretary.

ORJUNA never established its leader as a person of indisputable authority, which is normally a central feature of organisations modelled on fascism, due to the organisation's dependence on the DS and Pribićević. At the time of the organisation's founding, its members saw Pribićević as a possible Yugoslav version of Italian Duce Benito Mussolini. However, ORJUNA never acknowledged links to Pribićević. Instead, it viewed support from the DS as a form of tactical alliance.

== Structure ==
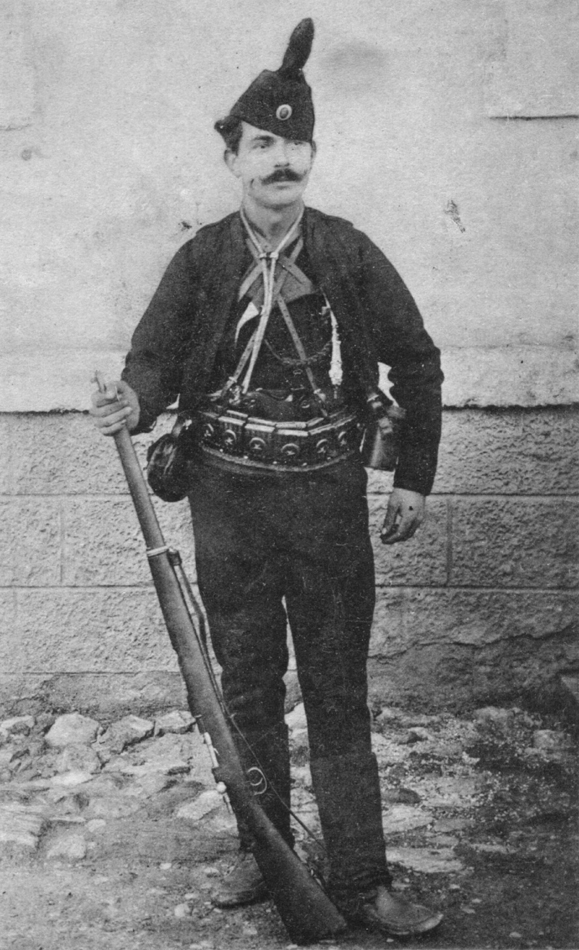
Ilija Trifunović Birčanin (pictured) commanded ORJUNA Action Groups.

Additional ORJUNA chapters were quickly established with the central government's support. By the end of 1922, there were 250 new chapters. Of that number, 100 were founded in Croatia-Slavonia and Dalmatia, with district-level organisations set up in Split and Zagreb. Out of that number, at least 45 were established in Dalmatia alone, and Dalmatia, as the region under threat of Italian irredentism, proved favourable for the development of Yugoslav nationalism. In 1922, local and district-level organisations were established in Serbia, especially in Vojvodina (Yugoslav regions of Bačka, Banat, and Baranya), in Slovenia, and in Bosnia and Herzegovina. Split was the seat of the organisation from its founding until 1927, when it was moved to Belgrade.

Early membership largely consisted of former members of the prewar JNO. Early membership recruits were heterogeneous drawing intellectuals from Dalmatia and Slovenia, including people moving to the country from the territories ceded to Italy under the Treaty of Rapallo, and Chetnik associations. The membership size is inconsistently reported by various sources. ORJUNA itself claimed it had 100,000 members in 1925, while Leontić later claimed there were 40,000 ORJUNA members at the time. The membership declined after that. At the 1923 congress, it was reported that seven districts included 296 local chapters. The latter figure grew to 302 by 1925.

ORJUNA established special units through its armed wing, known as Action Groups. By 1925, the Action Groups had 10,000 members. (Note: Each unit was referred to by ORJUNA as akciona sekcija (plural akcione sekcije). English-language sources normally refer to the units as the Action Groups. They are referred to as the Action Troops in a paper by Croatian literary historian Ivan Bošković, and as Action squads in works by Serbian historian Vasilije Dragosavljević.) In terms of their organisation, the Action Groups resembled the Italian fascist Blackshirts. The Action Groups were organised in battalions and companies, carrying light arms. The weapons were provided by White Hand secret military organisation. ORJUNA uniforms were black, similar in appearance to the ones used by the Chetnik associations and the Blackshirts. Each unit was commanded by a čelnik (lit. 'head') with a superior district čelnik and the veliki čelnik lit. 'grand head') in overall command. In 1924, ORJUNA appointed Kosta Pećanac and Ilija Trifunović-Birčanin to the position. Later, Marko Kranjec took it over. Bulat, Berislav Angjelinović, and Uroš Bijelić gained prominence in ORJUNA through their brutal conduct in the Action Groups.

There were also a high-school section (named Young Yugoslavia) and an economic section of ORJUNA, aimed at ensuring future recruitment and financing of the organisation, respectively. Academic sections were set up at universities, while cultural sections were tasked with organising training courses, concerts, festivities, and similar events. The propaganda section was established to promote ORJUNA among the general public, but it was largely inactive.

== Activities ==
=== Croatia ===
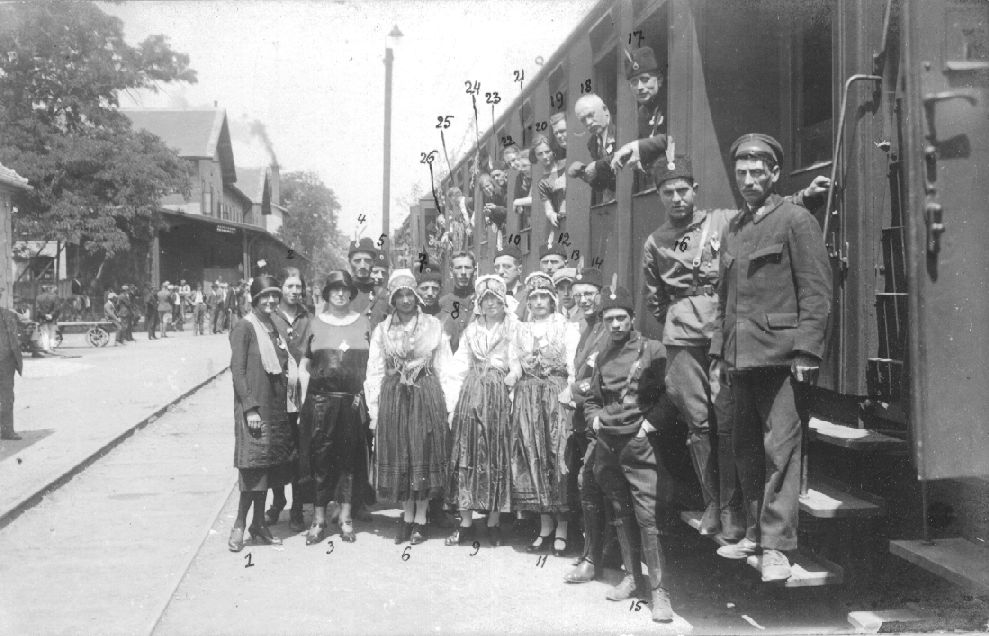
Slovenian members stopping in Inđija en route to the 1925 ORJUNA congress in Belgrade

ORJUNA was particularly active in threatened regions: Dalmatia, Slovenia, and Vojvodina. One of ORJUNA's first public actions took place following the assassination of the Interior Minister Milorad Drašković by the Crvena pravda faction of the Communist Party of Yugoslavia (KPJ) in July 1921. ORJUNA organised public protests in Split where suspected communists were attacked in the streets and their homes ransacked, as well as two days of protests in Zagreb where clashes with Croatian Bloc supporters took place. ORJUNA deemed Drašković's assassination as casus belli, justifying violence against enemies of the state.

In Croatia (including Dalmatia), ORJUNA's activities were primarily aimed against the HSS and independent federalist politicians Ante Trumbić and Mate Drinković. Special units established by ORJUNA carried out armed attacks against the opponents' political rallies. In Dalmatia, ORJUNA organised public protests against the Croatian Bloc. The violence was not always directed at political rallies, and there were instances where the Action Groups targeted Croat-owned shops for staying open during public holidays meant to celebrate the anniversary of the proclamation of Yugoslavia. In October 1922, the Croatian Party of Rights (HSP) established the Croatian National Youth (HANAO) in response to ORJUNA's activities. (Note: Other sources indicate that HANAO was established under the patronage of the HSS-dominated Croatian Bloc coalition, which included the HSP. The organisation became increasingly radical, and its political positions coincided with those of the HSP. The HSS eventually withdrew its support to HANAO and turned to the HSP for support. In any case, HANAO was inspired by the pre-First World War organisation Young Croatia, which was itself inspired by the ideology of the HSP, specifically its Frankist faction.) Physical and armed clashes between the two organisations were frequent, occurring almost daily in Zagreb and Petrovaradin.

=== Serbia and Vojvodina ===
ORJUNA claimed at its peak in 1925 that it had 7,600 members in Vojvodina. The provincial organisations appealed to their members more through the struggle against ethnic Hungarians and the Volksdeutsche, than through the Yugoslavist ideology. Namely, in the province, ORJUNA targeted Germans, Hungarians, and Hungarian-speaking Jews portrayed as foreign elements threatening the state. The three groups dominated the provincial economy and comprised most of the province's population, but ORJUNA did not target Slovaks because they were deemed loyal to the state and therefore not attacked. German and Hungarian newspaper offices and political rallies were also attacked. When perpetrators of ORJUNA's attacks were arrested, they were commonly released without charges.

The People's Radical Party (NRS) challenged ORJUNA by establishing a competing Serbian National Youth (SRNAO) in 1922. The SRNAO's founders were spurred to action by believing that ORJUNA was not fully achieving Serbian interests. The NRS appealed to ORJUNA membership there by favouring the Greater Serbian agenda instead of Yugoslavism, resulting in ORJUNA losing more than half of its membership in Vojvodina to SRNAO by 1923. The conflict also led to physical violence between the two organisations. Regardless of their clashes, ORJUNA and SRNAO occasionally led joint attacks against the minorities.

In Serbia, ORJUNA was relatively inactive until 1927, except in what was then Southern Serbia (the territory roughly corresponding to the present-day Kosovo and Northern Macedonia), where its activities were aimed at combating the Džemijet party representing Albanians, Slavic Muslims, and Turks. Just like in Vojvodina, SRNAO challenged ORJUNA in Serbia.

=== Slovenia ===
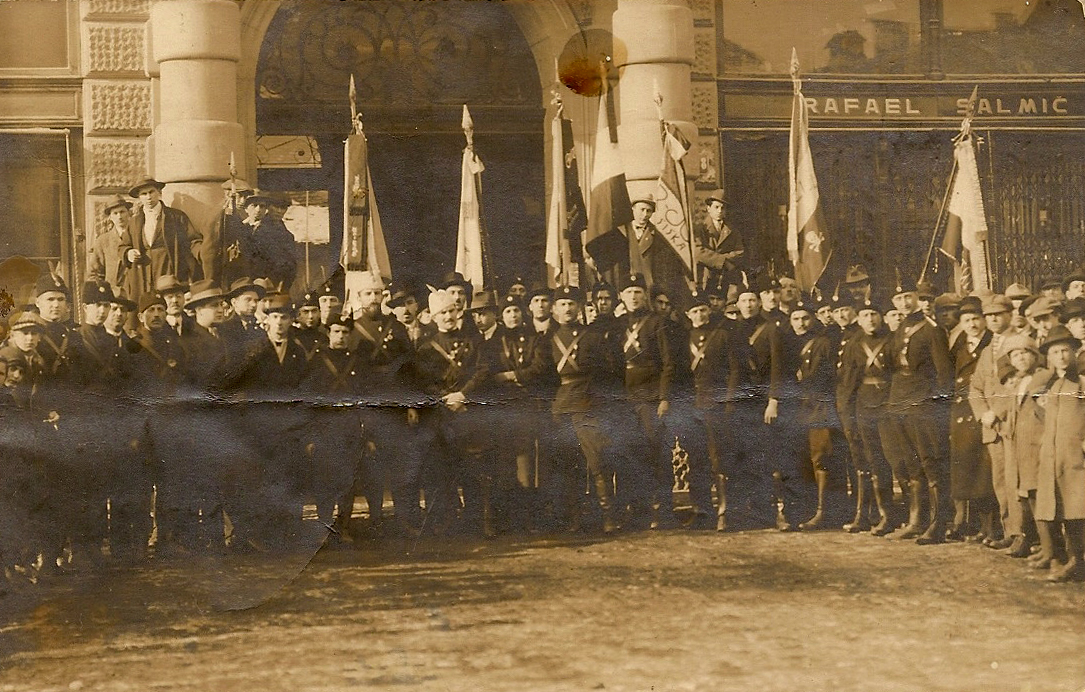
ORJUNA members in Celje

The German-speaking minority was also targeted in Slovenia. The attacks included bombing Cillier Zeitung newspaper offices, assaults on social events organised by the minority, and public protests against the Germans involving ransacking German-owned homes. Furthermore, ORJUNA targeted the Slovene People's Party as political enemies of the state and clericalists. In turn, the Slovenec Catholic political magazine was particularly critical of ORJUNA in Slovenia.

In 1923, a third of the 10,000 Slovenian ORJUNA members were a part of the Action Groups. The Action Groups regularly clashed with KPJ supporters, with the largest such confrontation taking place in late 1923 in Trbovlje, Slovenia, during a miners' strike. ORJUNA organised a competing event, and the armed clash resulted in seven deaths. ORJUNA competed with the KPJ for influence among workers by establishing its trade unions. These efforts were more successful in Dalmatia, Slovenia, and Vojvodina than in other parts of Yugoslavia.

=== Bosnia and Herzegovina ===
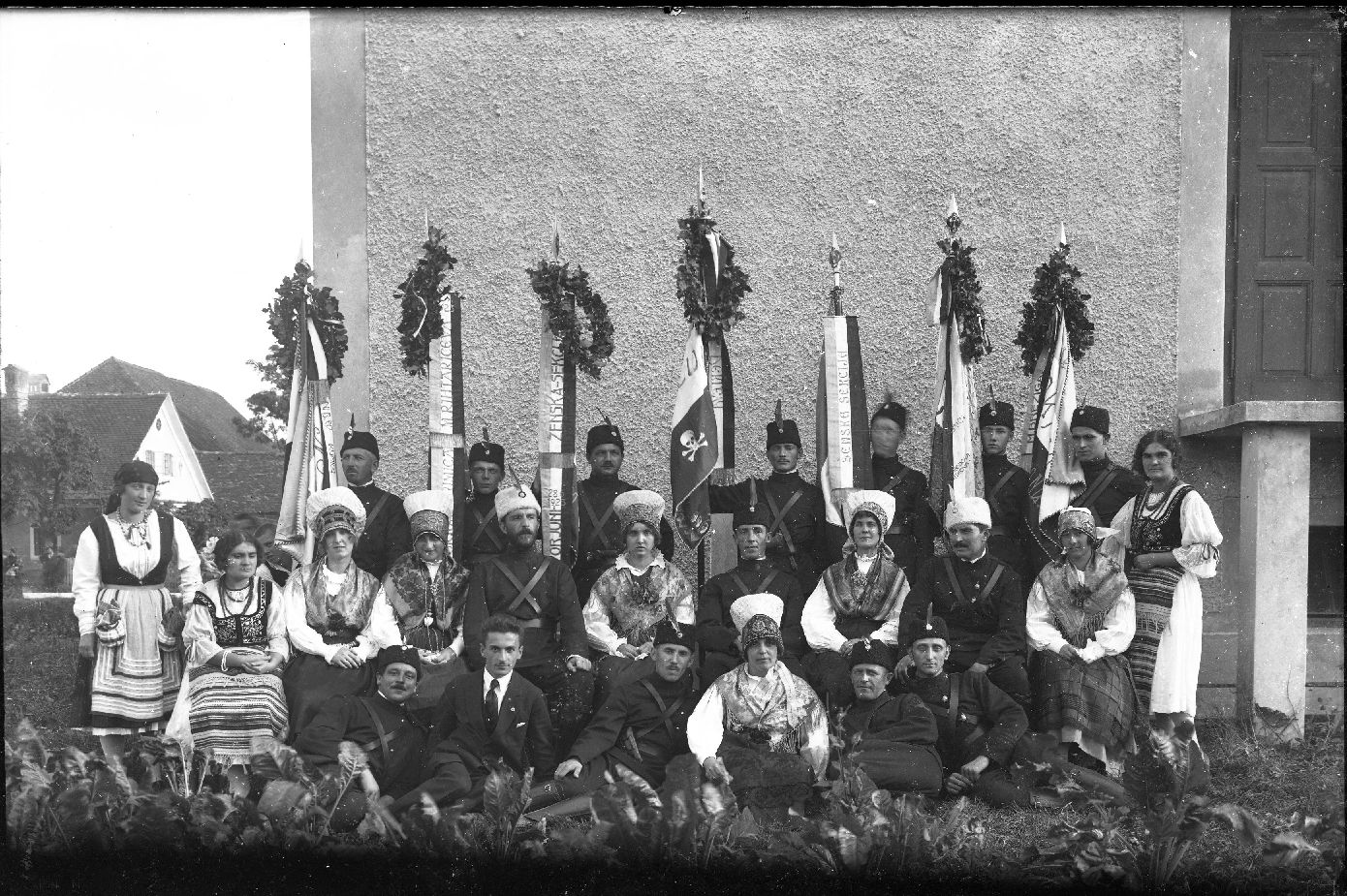
ORJUNA flag presentation in Vič near Ljubljana

In Bosnia and Herzegovina, ORJUNA targeted the country's leading Slavic Muslim party, the Yugoslav Muslim Organization. This included armed clashes with the party's supporters, sometimes resulting in fatalities. There were also violent clashes between ORJUNA and HANAO, as well as with SRNAO. Bosnia and Herzegovina had the poorest organisation of ORJUNA among all provinces or areas of Yugoslavia, except Montenegro, where no ORJUNA organisations existed.

=== Italy and Austria ===
ORJUNA Action Groups carried out attacks in Julian March in Italy and, to a lesser extent, in Austria. There were clashes with Italian and Austrian border patrols. ORJUNA also established clandestine groups in Istria and in Carinthia. With the support of the Royal Yugoslav Army (but not the government), ORJUNA members were used as counterintelligence assets against Italy and Hungary. The organisation promoted Yugoslav irredentism and advocated annexation of parts of territories of all Yugoslavia's neighbouring countries. ORJUNA saw Italy as the main impediment to territorial expansion of Yugoslavia at the expense of all of its neighbours. In Italy, it established links and cooperation with Slovene–Croat resistance organisation TIGR and drew members from TIGR. ORJUNA's activities in Italy and Austria did not impact Yugoslav foreign policy in any significant way.

One of ORJUNA's final large actions took place on 29–31 May 1928, when it organised protests against ratification of the Treaty of Nettuno between Italy and Yugoslavia. The largest protest took place in Belgrade, and additional protests happened simultaneously in Šibenik, Split, Dubrovnik, Ljubljana, Skopje, Sarajevo, and Zagreb. The protesters errected barricades and clashed with the police. Two protesters were killed and about 50 injured in Belgrade.

== Decline and dissolution ==
ORJUNA peaked in 1922–1925 when it assumed the role of violent suppression of opponents of the unitarist policy of the government championed by Pribićević. Its power gradually declined afterwards. The decline coincided with Pribićević breaking with the DS (subsequently forming the Independent Democratic Party) and joining the opposition. His move to the opposition deprived ORJUNA of a major source of its political power.

A division in the leadership occurred in 1928. Pribićević accused ORJUNA organisations in Vojvodina and Serbia of being run by the government. His statement was followed by that of Bulat as the head of the Split district, accusing the Belgrade district of ORJUNA of espousing the Greater Serbian agenda and of having overly close ties to the NRS. In response, the head of the Vojvodina district Dobroslav Jevđević disbanded ORJUNA in Vojvodina the next day. In turn, Dimitrijević expelled both Bulat and Jevđević, but the Split district rejected Dimitrijević's decision. In response, the Ministry of the Interior dissolved all ORJUNA organisations in the Split district. The conflict marked the break-up of the unified organisation. ORJUNA was banned shortly afterwards, along with all other political organisations, upon the institution of the royal dictatorship in 1929. In its final act, ORJUNA declared its support for the dictatorship, believing it was the fulfilment of its programme of integral Yugoslavism. A portion of former ORJUNA members continued to pursue political activities by joining the Yugoslav Action and Association of Fighters of Yugoslavia.

== Publications and logo ==
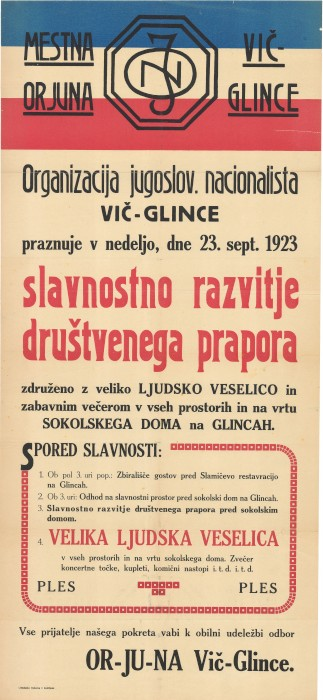
A 1923 ORJUNA poster

In August 1921, five months after ORJUNA's establishment, the organisation began producing its publication Pobeda (lit. 'Victory') in Split. The initiative for its launch came from Angjelinović. The initial issue of the newspaper received congratulatory messages from Speaker of the Assembly of Yugoslavia Ivan Ribar, Pribićević, and others, as well as a poem by Aleksa Šantić that became the organisation's anthem. Pobeda used combative rhetoric to denounce groups they deemed enemies of the state. Those included communists, clericalists, (Note: In early 1920s, in the context of Yugoslav politics, the term clericalists was often used as a reference to the Slovene People's Party and the Croatian Popular Party.) Croatian Bloc supporters, Trumbić, and HSS leader Stjepan Radić specifically, and Zagreb's Jewish population in general. ORJUNA published several other regional or local newspapers. After 1925, as membership declined, most were affected by a lack of money and ceased publication.

The ORJUNA logo was created by Radovan Tommaseo, an artist from Split, in September 1921. The logo consisted of overlaid black letters J, N, and O set in an octagon with a blue, white, and red triple border.

== Legacy ==
Because it opposed the parliamentary democracy and advocated for dictatorial rule in the country, the general public largely viewed ORJUNA as a fascist organisation. Its efforts were a failure given the popularity of its nominal enemies—the KPJ and the HSS. The latter became the Croats' dominant political party partly due to its opposition to the integral Yugoslavism. Despite ORJUNA's efforts, Yugoslavism as an idea did not appeal to a broader public, even though the organisation enjoyed significant support in Dalmatia in its early years. There was an attempt at reestablishing ORJUNA following the proclamation of the Octroyed Constitution introduced by a royal decree in 1931. The attempt failed due to a lack of interest of the public.

In Croatia, ORJUNA's stated struggle against Croatian separatism was viewed in the context of ORJUNA's reliance on Pribićević and his power base among Serbs outside Serbia, especially the Croatian Serbs. In turn, it contributed to a significant deterioration of the Croat–Serb relations.

During the Second World War, following the 1941 Invasion of Yugoslavia, the largest portion of ORJUNA's prominent members joined the Axis-collaborating Chetniks. That group included Jevđević, Trifunović Birčanin, and Bartulović. Others, like Leontić, joined the KPJ-led Yugoslav Partisans.

In the 1990s, the term orjunaš (lit. 'a member of ORJUNA') was used by Croatian right-wing commentators as a derogatory term to describe the left-wing and liberal opposition to the ruling Croatian Democratic Union as enemies of the Croatia's statehood. In the process, those commentators argued that the Yugoslavist ideology was a part of the Greater Serbian political project.

== Sources ==
- Banac, Ivo (1984). The National Question in Yugoslavia: Origins, History, Politics. Ithaca: Cornell University Press. ISBN 0-8014-1675-2.
- Bartulović, Željko (2004). "Skupštinski izbori u Hrvatskom primorju 1920. i 1923. godine" [Parliamentary Elections in the Croatian Littoral in Year 1920 and 1923]. Zbornik radova Pravnog fakulteta Sveučilišta u Mostaru (in Croatian). 17. Faculty of Law, University of Mostar: 225–238. ISSN 1029-4031.
- Blamires, Cyprian P. (2006). World Fascism: A Historical Encyclopedia. Santa Barbara: ABC-CLIO. ISBN 978-1-57607-940-9.
- Bošković, Ivan J. (2007). "Splitski orjunaški list Pobeda i Stjepan Radić" [The Orjuna Newspaper Pobeda of Split and Stjepan Radić]. Časopis za suvremenu povijest (in Croatian). 39 (1). Zagreb: Croatian Institute of History: 117–132. ISSN 0590-9597.
- Davidonis, Anthony C. (1943). The American Naval Mission in the Adriatic, 1918–1921 (PDF). Washington, DC: United States Department of the Navy. OCLC 1112737551.
- Dévavári, Zoltán (2017). "Violence as the Weapon of Political Parties: The Operation of ORJUNA and SRNAO in Vojvodina (1922–1924)". Istraživanja (28). University of Novi Sad: 147–170. doi:10.19090/i.2017.28.147-170. ISSN 0350-2112.
- Dragosavljević, Vasilije (2015). "Influences of Italian fascism on ideology and political practice of the Organization of Yugoslav Nationalists (ORJUNA)" (PDF). In Biagini, Antonello; Vučetić, Biljana; Rudić, Srđan (eds.). Serbian-Italian Relations: History and Modern Times. Belgrade: Institute of History Belgrade and Sapienza University of Rome. pp. 231–242. ISBN 9788677431099.
- Dragosavljević, Vasilije (2019). "Irredentist Actions of the Slovenian Organisation of Yugoslav Nationalists (the ORJUNA) in Italy and Austria (1922–1930)". Prispevki za novejšo zgodovino. 59 (3). Ljubljana: Institute of Contemporary History: 31–52. ISSN 2463-7807.
- Dragosavljević, Vasilije (2023). "Radical Right-Wing Yugoslav Integralist Movements between Conservativism and Fascism". In Bakić, Dragan; Fundić, Dušan (eds.). Right-wing Politics in Interwar Southeastern Europe: Between Conservatism and Fascism. Belgrade: Balkanološki institute SANU. pp. 27–52. ISBN 9788671791236.
- Đorđević, Mladen (2005). "Organizacija jugoslovenskih nacionalista (ORJUNA): Istorijat – ideologija – uticaji" [The Yugoslav Nationalists Organization (ORJUNA): History-Ideology-Impact]. Nova srpska politička misao (in Serbian). 12 (1–4). Belgrade: Vreme: 187–221. ISSN 1450-7382.
- Đurašković, Stevo (2011). "Ideologija Organizacije jugoslovenskih nacionalista (Orjuna)" [The Ideology of the Organization of Yugoslav Nationalists (Orjuna)]. Časopis za suvremenu povijest (in Croatian). 43 (1). Zagreb: Croatian Institute of History: 225–247. ISSN 0590-9597.
- Gligorijević, Branislav (1963). "Organizacija jugoslovenskih nacionalista (Orjuna)" [Organisation of Yugoslav Nationalists (Orjuna)]. Istorija XX Veka (in Serbian) (V). Belgrade: Institute of Social Sciences. Department of Historical Sciences: 315–396.
- Hadži-Jovančić, Perica (2020). The Third Reich and Yugoslavia: An Economy of Fear, 1933-1941. London: Bloomsbury Publishing. ISBN 9781350138063.
- Jakir, Aleksandar (2019). "Unitarističko jugoslavenstvo kao nacionalna ideologija u redovima "jugoslavenske omladine" u Kraljevini Srba, Hrvata i Slovenaca" [Unitaristic Yugoslavism as a National Ideology among the Ranks of the "Yugoslav Youth" in the Kingdom of Serbs, Croats and Slovenes]. In Agičić, Damir; Petrić, Hrvoje; Šimetin Šegvić, Filip (eds.). Zbornik Drage Roksandića [Proceedings of Drago Roksandić] (in Croatian). Zagreb: FF Press. pp. 755–769. doi:10.17234/9789531759021.53. ISBN 9789531757072.
- Karaula, Željko (2008). "Hrvatska nacionalna omladina – (HANAO): prilog proučavanju djelovanja i rada hrvatskih omladinskih organizacija u Kraljevini SHS" [Croatian National Youth (HANAO). Activities of Croatian Youth Associations in the Kingdom of Serbs, Croats and Slovenes]. Historijski zbornik (in Croatian). 61 (2). Zagreb: Društvo za hrvatsku povjesnicu: 289–322. ISSN 0351-2193.
- MacMillan, Margaret (2002). Paris 1919: Six Months That Changed the World. New York City: Random House Publishing Group. ISBN 9780375760525.
- Milošev, Marko (2019). Within and Outside the Political System: Comparative Approach to Abortive Radical Right Movements ORJUNA, HANAO and SRNAO in Yugoslavia 1921–1929 (MA thesis). Budapest: Central European University.
- Newman, John Paul (2015). Yugoslavia in the Shadow of War: Veterans and the Limits of State Building, 1903–1945. Cambridge: Cambridge University Press. ISBN 978-1-107-07076-9.
- Ramet, Sabrina P. (2006). The Three Yugoslavias: State-building and Legitimation, 1918–2005. Bloomington: Indiana University Press. ISBN 9780253346568.
- Šarac, Nedim (1968). "Bosna i Hercegovina u koncepcijama ustava Jugoslovenske države 1920–1921. godine" [Bosnia and Herzegovina in the Concepts of Constitution of the Yugoslav State in 1920–1921]. Prilozi (in Bosnian) (4). Sarajevo: Institut za istoriju, University of Sarajevo: 123–155. ISSN 0350-1159.
