= Josip Torbar (politician, born 1889) =

Croatian politician (1889–1963)

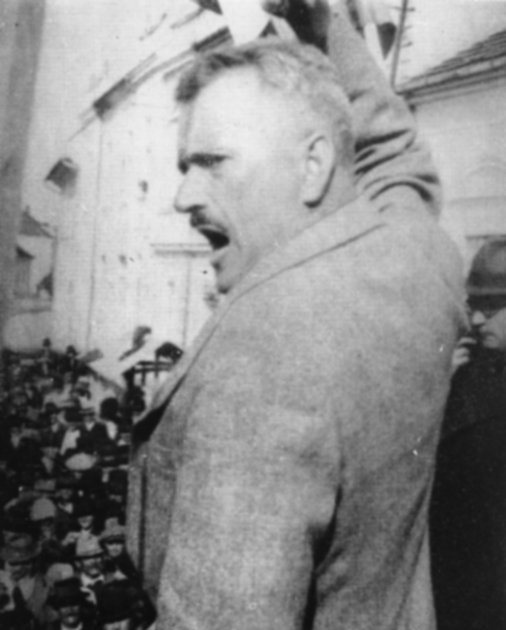

Minister of Posts, Telegraph and Telephone of Yugoslavia
- In office 5 February 1939 – 10 January 1942
- Monarch: Peter II of Yugoslavia
- Prime Minister: Dragiša Cvetković
- Preceded by: Panta Jovanović
- Succeeded by: Juraj Krnjević

Personal details
- Born: April 12, 1889 Hrženik near Krašić, Croatia-Slavonia, Austria-Hungary
- Died: January 5, 1963 (aged 73) New York City, United States
- Resting place: Mirogoj Cemetery, Zagreb, Croatia
- Party: Croatian Peasant Party
- Spouse: Jelka Torbar
- Relations: Josip Torbar (uncle)
- Children: 2 sons (Josip, Stjepan)
- Education: University of Zagreb
- Profession: lawyer, politician

Josip Torbar (12 April 1889 – 5 January 1963) was a Croatian politician, lawyer, and member of the Croatian Peasant Party (Croatian: Hrvatska seljačka stranka, HSS). He was involved in leading the party through the interwar period during the tenure of Vladko Maček and during World War II. He was a member of the parliament of the Kingdom of Yugoslavia, and a minister in the governments of Dragiša Cvetković and Dušan Simović. During World War II, Torbar met several times with Ante Pavelić, the head of the puppet regime of the Independent State of Croatia (NDH) ruled by the Ustaše. In meetings, Torbar attempted to secure a more favourable position for the HSS, which the Ustaše had formally banned. Alternatively, Torbar tried to persuade Pavelić to change specific policies, remove certain officials from power, release arrested HSS members, or hand over power to the HSS if the Western Allies prevailed over the Nazi Germany.

In late 1943 and throughout 1944, Torbar was involved in planning the Lorković–Vokić plot designed to remove Pavelić from power in the NDH, align with the Western Allies, disarm German troops, and install the HSS in power. The plan failed, and the conspirators, including Torbar, were arrested and imprisoned. Torbar was released in May 1945, and he fled the country to Italy, Argentina, Canada, and finally to the United States.

== Early years ==
Josip Torbar was born in the hamlet of Hrženik near the village of Krašić, south of Zagreb, on 12 April 1889. He had a brother and two sisters. His paternal uncle was Josip Torbar, the president of the Yugoslav Academy of Sciences and Arts and one of its founders. Torbar attended secondary education in Požega Gymnasium and the I Gymnasium of Zagreb before studying law at the University of Zagreb. After graduation, he worked in law firms in Slavonski Brod and Zagreb. He opened his law office in Zagreb in 1919 and became a notary public in 1925. Two years later, he opened a law firm together with his brother-in-law Ivan Pernar, and their families bought and moved together to a two-apartment house in Zagreb. Pernar was a member of parliament of the Kingdom of Serbs, Croats and Slovenes (later renamed Yugoslavia) elected on the Croatian Peasant Party (HSS) ticket, and shot by Puniša Račić in parliament on 20 June 1928. Several HSS members were killed or died from their wounds, but Pernar recovered. The fatalities included the HSS leader Stjepan Radić.

Torbar was married to Jelka until her death on 2 May 1937. He had two sons with her: Josip, nicknamed "Mirko", and Stjepan, nicknamed "Braco".

== Political life ==
=== Interwar period ===
Torbar initially supported the Party of Rights, but switched his allegiance to the HSS after World War I. In 1925, he was first appointed a member of an HSS local organisation in Zagreb, and elected deputy HSS member of the Zagreb district assembly on Radić's direction. Torbar was not a part of the HSS leadership until after the 6 January Dictatorship began in 1929. Shortly thereafter, Torbar hosted the covert meeting of the HSS leadership consisting of Vladko Maček (Radić's successor as the head of the HSS), Josip Predavec, Juraj Krnjević, August Košutić, Ante Trumbić, and Pernar with Većeslav Wilder and Juraj Demetrović (of the Independent Democratic Party) where further political activities under the dictatorship were discussed. By 1934, Torbar was included among Maček's closest associates along with Trumbić, Ivan Šubašić, and Vilko Begić. His political rise was aided by his relationship with Pernar and his friendship with Aloysius Stepinac. (The latter was appointed the coadjutor bishop to Archbishop Antun Bauer in 1934.) From July 1933 to December 1934, while Maček was imprisoned, Trumbić was the acting leader of the HSS, and Torbar one of his closest associates.

Torbar became more active politically in 1935. He was elected on the United Opposition ticket led by Maček in the Zlatar district in the 1935 Yugoslavian parliamentary election. He became a part of HSS's top leadership, which included Maček as the president, Košutić as his deputy, and Krnjević as the party secretary, as well as Ljudevit Tomašić, Juraj Šutej, Bariša Smoljan, Ivan Andres, Đuka Kemfelja, Josip Reberski, Tomo Jančiković, Šubašić, and Torbar. In this period, Torbar became the first deputy president of Hrvatski radiša, an organisation established to place apprentices in workshops and retail stores, a position he held until 1940. Torbar was also the president of the HŠK Građanski Zagreb from 1937 to 1941 and the president of the Croatian Mountaineering Association between 1939 and 1941. Following the 1939 Cvetković–Maček Agreement, Torbar was appointed the Minister of Posts, Telegraph, and Telephone in the government of Dragiša Cvetković.

=== Negotiations with Pavelić ===
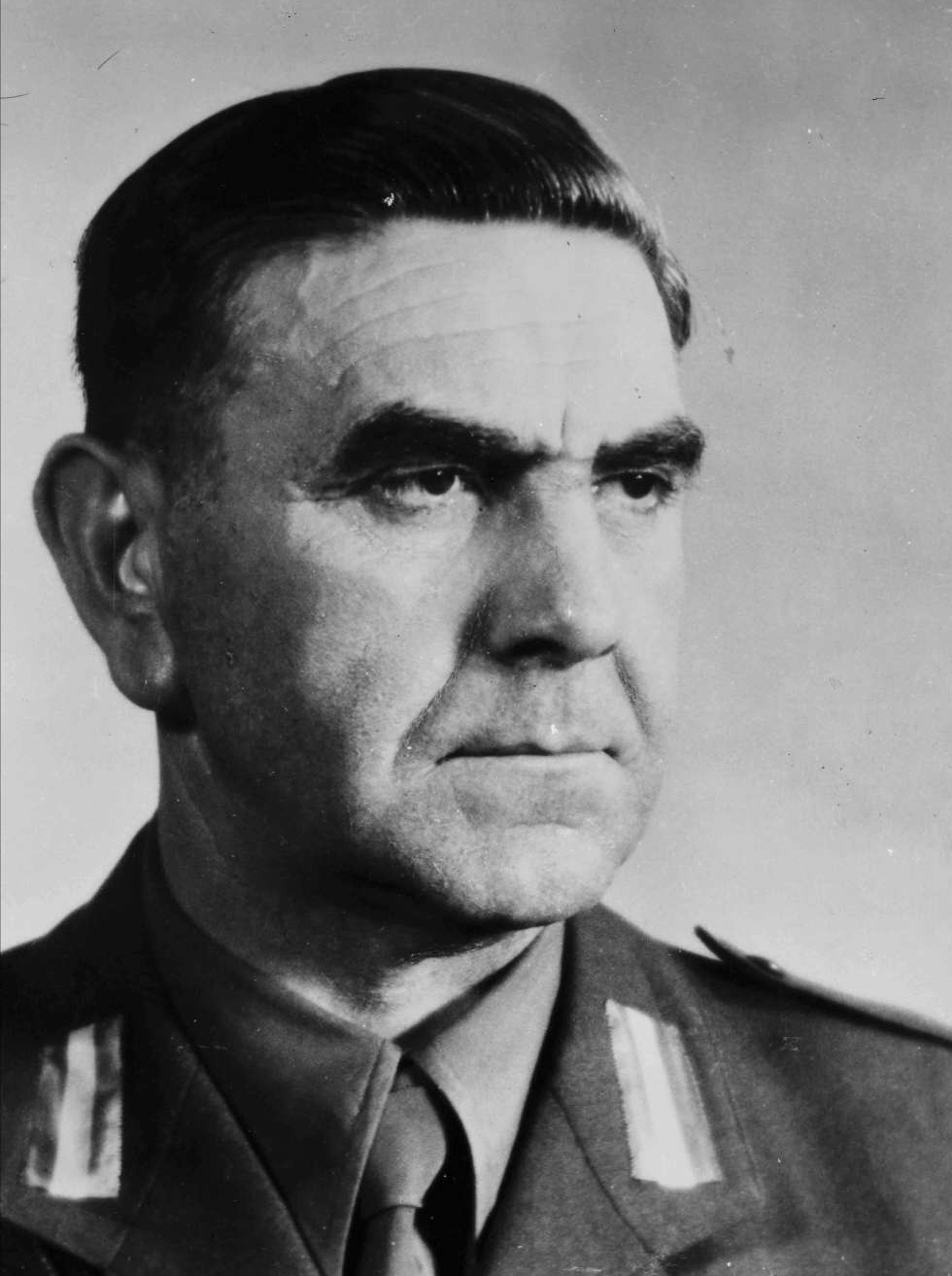
Ante Pavelić (pictured) promised Torbar the status of tolerated opposition to the HSS in the NDH.

Torbar remained in the ministerial position in the government of General Dušan Simović following the 1941 Yugoslav coup d'état. He left the government following the subsequent Axis powers Invasion of Yugoslavia. He retreated with the rest of the government from Belgrade to the town of Pale near Sarajevo. He attended his final government meeting there on 13 April before making his way to Zagreb. The Axis powers enabled the establishment of the puppet regime of the Independent State of Croatia (NDH), ruled by the Ustaše and led by Ante Pavelić in large parts of pre-war Yugoslavia. Some of the HSS members joined the Ustaše, but none of the top leadership members (Maček, Košutić, and Krnjević) did. Torbar remained loyal to Maček.

The NDH banned the HSS in June 1941 and detained Maček under house arrest in the village of Kupinec. In the summer of 1941, Torbar met Pavelić and informed him that the HSS would not object to the Ustaše holding on to power as long as the Axis powers had the upper hand, provided that there were "smart politics" in place and "compromised Ustaše [were] removed". In return, Pavelić promised reforms and the role of "tolerated opposition" for the HSS, but he did not keep any of these promises. Instead, in late summer or early autumn of 1941, after an envoy of the Nazi Germany Plenipotentiary General to the NDH Edmund Glaise-Horstenau visited Maček in Kupinec to find out if Maček would replace Pavelić, the situation deteriorated for the HSS. Afraid that Germany or Italy would install Maček as head of the NDH, the Ustaše ordered that Maček be taken to the Jasenovac concentration camp on 15 October. He was returned to house arrest in Kupinec in March 1942.

The Ustaše convened the Sabor in early 1942. The assembly members were not elected. Invitations to attend were sent to, among others, 93 HSS members, 60 of whom accepted. Torbar was not invited, and neither were other highest-ranking HSS members. In summer 1942, Torbar met with the NDH Minister of Interior Ante Nikšić and the two discussed the possibility of adding the HSS to the Government of the NDH and gradually eliminating the Ustaše from power. According to Pavelić's close ally Vjekoslav Vrančić, Pavelić had not authorised the meeting, but it was supported by the Germans who sought to replace Pavelić. Torbar met Pavelić again in late 1942 when the Ustaše leader explained that the HSS would not be legalised while Germans were there, adding that the "HSS is to be kept in reserve for the English". Torbar urged Pavelić to change his policies of persecuting Serbs and Jews because that reinforced popular discontent and led to increased support of the Communist Party of Yugoslavia-led Partisans. In 1942, Torbar met Pavelić a few more times to request the release of arrested HSS members.

=== Lorković–Vokić plot ===
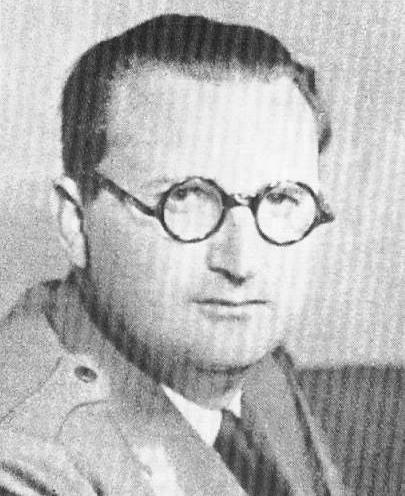
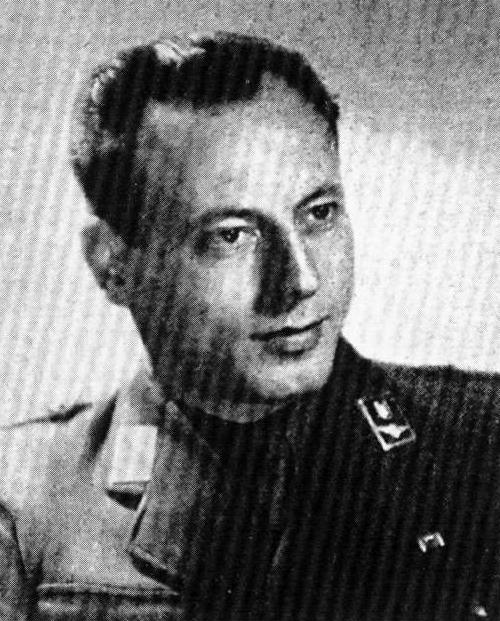
Interior Minister Mladen Lorković (left) and the Minister of Armed Forces Ante Vokić (right) led the attempt to overthrow the Ustaše in 1944.

Contacts between the Ustaše and the HSS resumed in summer and autumn 1943. The NDH Interior Minister Mladen Lorković and Prime Minister Nikola Mandić met a group of HSS members, including Torbar, led by Košutić. Mandić and Lorković offered to form a coalition government. Still, Košutić declined and proposed creating a government independent of either party with the task of restoring order and turning the power over to the HSS. Torbar was tasked with enlisting the support of (by then Archbishop) Stepinac in persuading Pavelić to concede power. The HSS felt this was possible first due to the news of the Allied invasion of Sicily, followed by Armistice of Cassibile, and finally by expected support of officers in the Croatian Armed Forces. In November 1943, Torbar received a letter from the former NDH Minister of Armed Forces Slavko Kvaternik urging the HSS to take over power in the NDH.

In spring 1944, Pavelić's offer to the HSS leaders to establish a coalition government was rejected. In March 1944, Lorković conspired with the NDH Minister of Armed Forces General Ante Vokić to devise a plan involving leading HSS members and Croatian Home Guard officers loyal to them to seize power in the NDH, disarm German forces stationed there, remove Pavelić from power, and invite the Western Allies to land on the eastern shore of the Adriatic Sea. Torbar was mentioned as a potential contact person between the HSS leadership and the Western Allies in Italy. The Lorković–Vokić plot failed and the conspirators, including Torbar and several other HSS members, were taken to the Lepoglava prison in September 1944. Torbar was released shortly before the defeat of the NDH in May 1945, probably in response to a request by Stepinac.

== Exile and death ==
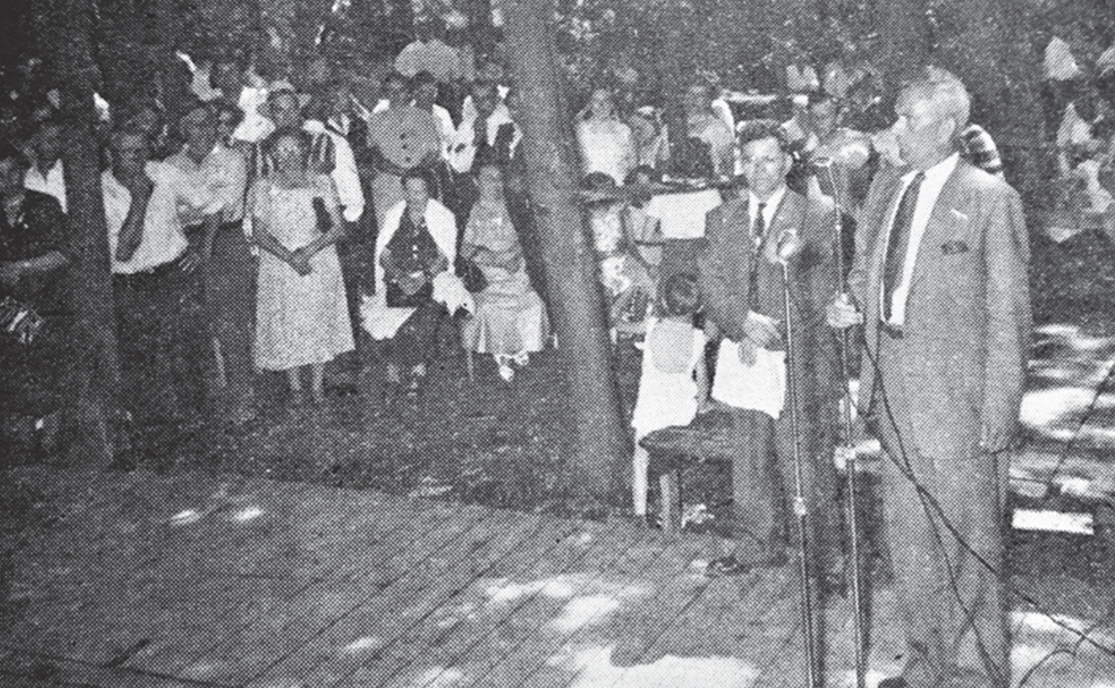
Torbar speaking in Hamilton, Ontario in 1954

Torbar left the country with his wife, sons, and HSS officials on 6 May 1945. The group first went to Austria for several months. Torbar, Pernar, and Reberski moved from Salzburg to Rome in October 1945. According to Yugoslav intelligence, Pope Pius XII received Torbar and provided him accommodation in the Santi Domenico e Sisto. Maček appointed Torbar and several other HSS officials in Rome to the newly established HSS Rome office, instructing them to recruit additional members unless they were a part of the Ustaše movement. The office maintained relations with the Vatican and the Polish General Władysław Anders, as well as few US military officers. The HSS officials in Rome disagreed about whether to come to an arrangement and potential alliance with the Ustaše émigrés, Serbian émigrés, or the new communist Yugoslav authorities led by Josip Broz Tito. Torbar favoured the latter option, believing that the Ustaše were to blame for the Croats' problems and opposing any agreement with supporters of the Greater Serbian agenda. While Maček was aware of the divisions, he did not openly support any faction. By late 1946 or early 1947, Torbar became frustrated with the work of the Rome office and Maček's inactivity.

By the summer of 1947, Torbar decided to move away from Rome with his sons. He relocated to Buenos Aires and then to Montreal before finally moving to the New York City in 1953. Torbar stayed in Pernar's new home in the United States, taking speaking engagements at Croatian diaspora venues. He was occasionally hosted at emigré events in Canada from the late 1940s until the 1960s. Torbar died in New York City on 5 January 1963. He was buried at the Woodlawn Cemetery, but his remains were transferred to Mirogoj Cemetery in Zagreb on 18 April 1995.
