= Union of Fighters =

Union of Fighters may refer to:

- Association of Fighters of Yugoslavia, Yugoslav nationalist organization
- A unit of Greek-Cypriot nationalist organization EOKA (1955–59)
- "Pan-Hellenic Union of Fighters", active in the Greek Civil War (1946–49)
- National Union of Freedom Fighters, active in Trinidad and Tobago (1970s)
- Union of Islamic Fighters, active in the Soviet–Afghan War
