= Niko Bartulović =

ORJUNA founder

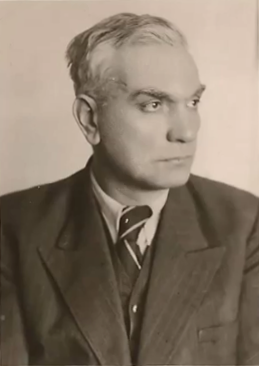
- Born: December 23, 1890; Stari Grad, Kingdom of Dalmatia, Austria-Hungary (modern-day Croatia)
- Died: 1945 unknown
- Citizenship: Yugoslavia
- Occupations: writer, publisher, journalist and translator
- Known for: Being one of the founders and ideologists of Organization of Yugoslav Nationalists from 1921; Joining the Chetniks during World War II

Niko Bartulović (23 December 1890 – 1945) was a Croatian and Yugoslav writer, publisher, journalist and translator known for being one of the founders and ideologists of the Organization of Yugoslav Nationalists in 1921. He joined the Chetniks during World War II.

== Before World War II ==
Bartulović was born on 23 December 1890 in Stari Grad, Hvar, Dalmatia, Austria-Hungary (modern-day Croatia).

Bartulović was the editor of journal "Pučka sloboda". In 1914, after the assassination of Archduke Franz Ferdinand, he was arrested.

Bartulović initiated and organized the publishing of the literary magazine Književni jug in 1918 while Branko Mašić provided financial sources. At the end of 1918, after World War I, he publicly proclaimed in Zagreb that Dalmatia would join the Kingdom of Serbia alone, if Zagreb did not want to do so. Bartulović is known as one of founders of the Organization of Yugoslav Nationalists (ORJUNA) in 1921, and one of its main ideologists.

On 28 May 1933, he was one of the speakers during a great anti-revisionist meeting held in Belgrade against attempts to revise the post-WWI peace agreements which was broadcast by Radio Belgrade, Radio Zagreb and Radio Ljubljana.

== During World War II ==
In the spring of 1943, Bartulović and two of his associates from Split travelled to Kolašin in the Italian governorate of Montenegro and met with the Chetnik ideologist Dragiša Vasić. Bartulović eventually joined the Chetniks.

When the Chetniks entered Dubrovnik at the end of 1943, members of the local ORJUNA established numerous Chetnik detachments that were merged into the Chetnik Battalion Lastovo.

It was speculated that Bartulović died as member of Chetnik forces at the end of 1943. Still, Bartulović participated in the Ba Congress, held between 25 and 28 January 1944, where he was elected as member of the committee of the Yugoslav Democratic National Union, a new political party established during the congress. After the capitulation of Italy in late 1943, the German forces occupied Split and put Bartulović to prison because of his contacts with Yugoslav government-in-exile, and he remained in German prison from 29 March to 26 October 1944.

== Death ==
Many post-war Yugoslav published works contain an inaccurate date of his death as 1943. Some sources state that he was murdered in 1945, based on orders of the Communist Party of Croatia, with full knowledge and support of Vladimir Bakarić and the Communist Party of Yugoslavia, because he was a Chetnik.

== Freemasonry ==
According to some sources Bartulović was a freemason. Together with Ferdo Šišić, Grga Novak and Vasilj Popović, Bartulović allegedly belonged to the influential Freemason lodge Dositej Obradović, which spread ideas about integral Yugoslavism within the Kingdom of Serbs, Croats and Slovenes.

During World War II, Bartulović belonged to a group of Croats from Dalmatia who wished to establish a "Yugoslav Revolutionary Movement" which would include all Croats who had not aligned themselves with the communists or Ustaše and establish military units under the name of the "Yugoslav Legion".

== Bibliography ==
Bartulović's bibliography includes:

- Ivanjski Krijesovi. Novele, 1920, Tisak i naklada „Tipografija" D. D. Zagreb
- Bartulović, Niko (1925). Od revolucionarne omladine do Orjuna: istorijat jugoslovenskog omladinskog pokreta. Direktorijum Orujne.
- Bartulović, Niko (1929). Na prelomu: roman. Narodna štamparija.

== Sources ==
- Đurić, Vojislav (1962). Ivo Andrić. Institut za teoriju književnosti i umetnosti.
- Rudić, Srđan; Denda, Dalibor; Đurić, Đorđe (2 July 2018). Dobrovoljci u Velikom ratu 1914-1918: = The Volunteers in the Great War 1914-1918. Istorijski institut : Institut za strategijska istraživanja : Matica srpska. ISBN 978-86-7743-129-7.
- Đuretić, Veselin (1997). Violence against the Serb uprising. Institut. ISBN 9788671790246.
- Mirošević, Franko (1992). Počelo je 1918.--: Južna Dalmacija 1918-1929. Školska knjiga. ISBN 978-86-03-00818-0.
- Jovanović, Nadežda (1974). Politički sukobi u Jugoslaviji: 1925-1928. Rad.
- Donat, Branimir (1 January 1998). Politika hrvatske književnosti i književnost hrvatske politike. Matica hrvatska. ISBN 978-953-150-157-6.
