= Književni jug =

Literary magazine in early 1900s

- Editor: Ivo Andrić; Niko Bartulović; Vladimir Ćorović; Branko Mašić; Anton Novačan; Miloš Crnjanski
- First issue: 1 January 1918
- Final issue: December 1919
- Based in: Zagreb
- Language: Serbo-Croatian

Književni jug (Serbo-Croatian: The Literary South, pronounced [kɲîʒeːʋniː jûg]) was a literary magazine published in 1918 and 1919 in Zagreb. In the spirit of integral Yugoslavism, involved authors sought to prepare the ground for future Yugoslav literature. From January to July 1918, its editors were Ivo Andrić, Niko Bartulović, Vladimir Ćorović and Branko Mašić. It was one of the most influential pro-Yugoslav journals in that time, publishing Serbo-Croatian works in both Serbian Cyrillic alphabet and Gaj's Latin alphabet, as well as untranslated works in Slovene.

In July 1918, Anton Novačan and Miloš Crnjanski joined the journal, while Ćorović left. Prominent authors whose works are published in Književni jug include Tin Ujević, Miroslav Krleža, Antun Barac, Vladimir Nazor, Isidora Sekulić, Sima Pandurović, Aleksa Šantić, Borivoje Jevtić, Ivo Vojnović, Dragutin Domjanić, Dinko Šimunović, Gustav Krklec, Ivan Cankar, Fran Albreht, and Franc Ksaver Meško.
