= Yugoslav National Movement =

Yugoslavian political party

Yugoslav National Movement Југословенски народни покрет Jugoslovenski narodni pokret
- President: Dimitrije Ljotić
- Vice president: Juraj Korenić
- Founded: 6 January 1935; 91 years ago
- Dissolved: 1945; 81 years ago
- Merger of: Various radical groups (Note: Zbor was created by the merger of three fascist movements; the Yugoslav Action from Zagreb, the Association of Fighters of Yugoslavia from Ljubljana, and the Buđenje from Petrovgrad.)
- Headquarters: Belgrade, Yugoslavia
- Newspaper: Fatherland
- Student wing: White Eagles (from 1940)
- Paramilitary wing: Serbian Volunteer Corps
- Membership: approx. 6,000 (1939 est.)
- Ideology: Serbian fascism (Note: There are a substantial number of sources that label Zbor as a fascist organisation, and also a substantial number of sources that describe Zbor's leader, Dimitrije Ljotić, as fascist.): Monarchism; Christian nationalism; Corporate statism; National conservatism
- Political position: Far-right
- Religion: Serbian Orthodox Christianity
- Colours: Green Yellow White
- Anthem: "Vojska Smene"

Party flag

The Yugoslav National Movement (Serbo-Croatian: Југословенски народни покрет, Jugoslavenski narodni pokret), also known as the United Militant Labour Organization (Serbo-Croatian: Здружена борбена организација рада, Združena borbena organizacija rada, or Zbor / Збор), was a Yugoslav clerical fascist movement and organization led by politician Dimitrije Ljotić. Founded in 1935, it received considerable German financial and political assistance during the interwar period and participated in the 1935 and 1938 Yugoslav parliamentary elections, in which it never received more than 1 percent of the popular vote.

Following the Axis invasion and occupation of Yugoslavia in April 1941, the Germans selected several Zbor members to join the Serbian puppet government of Milan Nedić. The Serbian Volunteer Corps (SDK) was established as Zbor's party army. Ljotić had no control over the SDK, which was commanded by Colonel Kosta Mušicki. In late 1944, Ljotić and his followers retreated to Slovenia with the Germans and other collaborationist formations. In March, Ljotić and Chetnik leader Draža Mihailović agreed on a last-ditch alliance against the Yugoslav Partisans. Ljotić's followers were placed under the command of Chetnik commander Miodrag Damjanović. Ljotić was killed in an automobile accident in late April 1945. His followers later fled to Italy alongside the Chetniks. The Western Allies extradited many back to Yugoslavia following the war, where they were summarily executed and buried in mass graves. Those who were not extradited immigrated to western countries and established émigré organizations intended to promote Zbor's political agenda.

== Background ==
Dimitrije Ljotić was a right-wing politician in the Kingdom of Yugoslavia during the interwar period. As a loyalist to the Karađorđević dynasty, on 16 February 1931 he was appointed Yugoslav Minister of Justice by King Alexander. In June of that year, Ljotić suggested to Alexander that the Yugoslav political system be structured on the Italian fascist model. He presented him with a draft constitution that proposed "an organic constitutional hereditary monarchy, undemocratic and non-parliamentary, based on the mobilization of popular forces, gathered around economic, professional, cultural and charity organizations, that would be politically accountable to the king." The king rejected Ljotić's constitution as being too authoritarian. On 17 August, Ljotić resigned from his post after the government decided to create a single government-backed political party in Yugoslavia.

== Formation ==
In 1934, Alexander was assassinated in Marseille. That year, Ljotić made contact with three pro-fascist movements and the publishers of their respective newspapers—Otadžbina (Fatherland), published in Belgrade; the monthly Zbor (Rally), published in Herzegovina; and the weekly Buđenje (Awakening), published in Petrovgrad (modern Zrenjanin). Ljotić contributed to all three publications and became most influential with the Otadžbina movement. He subsequently founded the Yugoslav National Movement (Serbo-Croatian: Jugoslovenski narodni pokret), which was also known as the United Active Labour Organization (Združena borbena organizacija rada, or Zbor). Zbor was created by the merger of three fascist movements—Yugoslav Action, the "Fighters" from Ljubljana, and Buđenje from Petrovgrad. It was officially established in Belgrade on 6 January 1935, the sixth anniversary of King Alexander's dictatorship proclamation. Its members elected Ljotić as its president, Juraj Korenić its vice-president, Fran Kandare as second vice-president and Velibor Jonić as its secretary-general. Ljotić was chosen because of his previous stint as Minister of Justice and because of his connections with the royal court.

Zbor's official stated goal was the imposition of a planned economy and "the racial and biological defense of the national life force and the family". Otadžbina became its official newspaper. The party was declared illegal upon establishment since virtually all political parties in Yugoslavia had been banned since the declaration of King Alexander's dictatorship in 1929. On 2 September 1935, Jonić and attorney Milan Aćimović petitioned the Yugoslav Ministry of the Interior to legalize Zbor. On 8 November, the Ministry of the Interior conceded and recognized Zbor as an official political party. German officials in Yugoslavia quickly took notice of the movement, with the German envoy to Yugoslavia, Viktor von Heeren, providing it with financial assistance and infiltrating it with German agents. A German observer noted: "The movement Zbor represents a kind of national socialist party. Its principles are the struggle against Freemasons, against Jews, against Communists and against western capitalism." German industrial firms provided Zbor with further financial aid, as did German intelligence services. Most of the support that Zbor received in Serbia came from members of the urban middle class, right-wing students, and the armed forces. The majority of Zbor's members were ethnic Serbs, with some Croats and Slovenes joining the party in small numbers. Its membership fluctuated often due to disagreements over Ljotić's authoritarianism and lack of popularity and political power in Serbia. Ljotić was unpopular in Serbia due to his pro-German sympathies and religious fanaticism. The limited amount of support received by Zbor itself stemmed from the fact that radical right-wing sentiment was not strong amongst the Serbian population. This was because far right-wing politics were associated with Germany. Being extremely anti-German, the majority of ethnic Serbs rejected fascist and Nazi ideas outright. Zbor never had more than 10,000 active members at any given time, with most of its support coming from Smederevo and from the ethnic German (Volksdeutsche) minority in Vojvodina that had been exposed to Nazi propaganda since 1933.

During Milan Stojadinović's premiership, many members of Zbor left the party and joined Stojadinović's Yugoslav Radical Union (Serbo-Croatian: Jugoslovenska radikalna zajednica, JRZ). Nevertheless, the movement continued to advocate the abandonment of individualism and parliamentary democracy. Ljotić called for Yugoslavia to unite around a single ruler and return to its religious and cultural traditions, embracing the teachings of Christianity, traditional values and corporatism. He advocated a centrally organized state, stating that the unification of South Slavs was a historical and political inevitability and that Serbs, Croats and Slovenes shared "blood kinship and feeling of common fate." At the same time, the Yugoslavia that Ljotić envisioned was to be dominated by Serbia. Zbor openly promoted antisemitism, being the only party in Yugoslavia to openly do so, as well as xenophobia.

== 1935 and 1938 elections ==
Despite its opposition to parliamentary democracy, Zbor participated in the 1935 Yugoslav parliamentary elections. It offered 8,100 candidates throughout Yugoslavia. On 5 May, the Yugoslav government first announced the results of the elections, which showed that 72.6 percent of the eligible electorate had cast a total of 2,778,172 ballots. The party of Bogoljub Jevtić had received 1,738,390 (62.6%) votes and 320 seats in parliament, and the Opposition Bloc led by Vladko Maček had received 983,248 (35.4%) votes and 48 seats. Zbor finished last in the polls, with 23,814 (0.8%) votes, and had acquired no seats in parliament. Of all the votes it had received, 13,635 came from the Danube Banovina, in which Ljotić's home district of Smederevo was located. The election results initially published by authorities caused an upheaval amongst the public, forcing the government to publish the results of a recount on 22 May. The recount showed that 100,000 additional ballots that had not been recorded on 5 May had been cast and that Jevtić's party had received 1,746,982 (60.6%) votes and 303 seats, the Opposition Bloc had received 1,076,345 (37.4%) and 67 seats, and that Zbor had received 24,008 (0.8%) votes and again no seats.

In 1937, Ljotić began attacking Stojadinović through Zbor publications and accused him of complicity in King Alexander's assassination three years earlier. Stojadinović's government responded by exposing Ljotić as having been funded by the Germans and provided with financial resources by them to spread Nazi propaganda and promote German economic interests in Serbia. The incriminating material linking Ljotić with the Germans was given to Yugoslav authorities by German Luftwaffe commander Hermann Göring, a supporter of Stojadinović. Stojadinović used these revelations to his benefit in the following year's parliamentary elections, presenting his opponents, including Ljotić, as "disloyal agitators". Ljotić responded by attacking Stojadinović through issues of Otadžbina, many of which were subsequently banned. The Stojadinović government went on to prohibit all Zbor rallies and newspapers, confiscated Zbor propaganda material, and arrested Zbor leaders. In September 1938, Ljotić was arrested after the Yugoslav gendarmerie opened fire on a crowd of Zbor supporters, killing at least one person. A frequent churchgoer, he was charged with religious mania and briefly sent to an insane asylum before being released. On 10 October, Stojadinović dissolved the Parliament of Yugoslavia, proclaimed new elections and arranged further arrests of Zbor members. Ljotić responded by publicly stating that Zbor supporters were being arrested in order to prevent them from participating in the forthcoming elections. The parliamentary elections of December 1938 offered three candidates—Stojadinović, Maček, and Ljotić. During voting itself, members of opposition parties, including Zbor, were arrested and subjected to police intimidation, and voting registers were allegedly falsified in Stojadinović's favour. Zbor finished last in the elections, receiving 30,734 (1.01%) votes and again winning no seats in parliament. 17,573 of the votes in favour of Zbor were cast in the Danube Banovina, while the number of votes in the Dalmatian Littoral Banovina increased from 974 in May 1935 to 2,427 in December 1938.

== World War II ==
=== 1939–1941 ===
In August 1939, Ljotić's cousin, Milan Nedić, was appointed Yugoslav Minister of Defense. Later that year, almost all Zbor publications, including Otadžbina, Buđenje, Zbor, Naš put (Our Path) and Vihor (Whirlwind), were prohibited. Ljotić exploited the connections he had with Nedić to ensure that the banned Zbor-published journal Bilten (Bulletin) was distributed to members of the Royal Yugoslav Army. The journal was published illegally in a military printing house and distributed throughout the country by military couriers. Ljotić was the journal's main contributor and editor-in-chief. Fifty-eight issues of Bilten were published from March 1939 until October 1940, in which Ljotić advocated a pro-Axis Yugoslav foreign policy and criticized Belgrade's tolerance of Jews. As many as 20,000 copies each were printed of later issues of the journal. Ljotić was particularly pleased with being able to exert his ideological influence over young military academy trainees as well as older officers.

With the outbreak of World War II, Ljotić supported Yugoslavia's policy of neutrality in the conflict while promoting the position that Yugoslav diplomacy should focus on relations with Berlin. He vehemently opposed the August 1939 Cvetković–Maček Agreement and repeatedly wrote letters to Prince Paul urging him to annul it. In these letters, he advocated an immediate re-organization of the government according to Zbor ideology, the abolishment of Croatian autonomy, the division of the Royal Yugoslav Army into contingents of ethnic Serbs and some Croat and Slovene volunteers, who would be armed, and contingents of most Croats and Slovenes in the armed forces, who would serve as labour units and would be unarmed. Effectively, the purpose of all these points was to reduce non-Serbs in Yugoslavia to the status of second-class citizens. By this point, Zbor was infiltrated by the German Gestapo, the Abwehr (German military intelligence), and the Schutzstaffel (SS). In 1940, the Royal Yugoslav Army purged its pro-German elements and Ljotić lost much of the influence he held over the armed forces.

Ljotić's followers responded to the Cvetković–Maček Agreement with violence, clashing with the youth wing of the Communist Party of Yugoslavia (KPJ). These incidents attracted as many as 5,000 new members to Zbor and led to the formation of a Zbor student wing known as the White Eagles (Serbo-Croatian: Beli orlovi). In July 1940, Ljotić expressed his bitter opposition to the diplomatic recognition of the Soviet Union by Belgrade, which was meant to strengthen Yugoslavia internally in the case of war.

On 23 October 1940, White Eagles members massed outside the campus of the University of Belgrade. University president Petar Micić was a Zbor sympathizer. The Belgrade police, who were alleged to have had foreknowledge of the riots, withdrew from the area before violence erupted. The White Eagles members then threatened faculty and students with pistols and knives, stabbed some of them, hailed Adolf Hitler and Benito Mussolini as their heroes and shouted: "down with the Jews!" Members of Slovenski Jug (Slavic South), a Serbian nationalist movement, also participated in the riots, which were orchestrated by Ljotić in the hope that violence would provoke martial law and thus bring about a more centralized system of control in the university. The Serbian public responded to the riots with outrage. On 24 October, the Yugoslav government revoked Zbor's legal status. On 2 November, the Ministry of Interior sent a list of Zbor members to all municipal administrators in Serbia. The government cracked down on Zbor by detaining several hundred members, forcing Ljotić into hiding. One of the only public figures in Serbia to speak in favour of Ljotić during this period was Serbian Orthodox Bishop Nikolaj Velimirović, who praised his "faith in God" and "good character". Although a government investigation found that Zbor was guilty of high treason for accepting German funds, the authorities were careful not to arrest Ljotić in order not to provoke the Germans. Ljotić was placed under government surveillance, but authorities quickly lost track of him. He hid with friends in Belgrade and remained in contact with Nedić and Velimirović. On 6 November, Nedić resigned from his post to protest the government crackdown on Zbor. Additional issues of Bilten continued to be printed despite his resignation. These supported a pro-Axis Yugoslav foreign policy, criticized the government's tolerance of Jews and Freemasons and attacked pro-British members of the government for their opposition to Yugoslavia, signing the Tripartite Pact. Ljotić remained in hiding until April 1941.

=== 1941–1945 ===
On 6 April 1941, Axis forces invaded Yugoslavia. Poorly equipped and poorly trained, the Royal Yugoslav Army was quickly defeated. Several dozen Royal Yugoslav Army officers affiliated with Zbor were captured by the Wehrmacht during the invasion but were quickly released. The Germans sent Ljotić a written notice assuring his freedom of movement in German-occupied Serbia. Not long after German forces entered Belgrade, Ljotić's followers were given the task of selecting an estimated 1,200 Jews from the city's non-Jewish population.

Upon occupying Serbia, the Germans prohibited the activity of all political parties except Zbor. Although they originally intended to make Ljotić the head of a Serbian puppet government, both Ljotić and the Germans realized that his unpopularity would make any government led by him a failure. The Germans soon invited Ljotić to join the initial Serbian puppet government, the Commissioner Administration of Milan Aćimović. Ljotić was offered the position of economic commissioner but never took office, partly because he disliked the idea of playing a secondary role in the administration and partly because of his unpopularity. He resorted to indirectly exerting his influence over the Serbian puppet government through two of his closest associates, Zbor members Stevan Ivanić and Miloslav Vasiljević, whom the Germans had selected as commissioners. The Germans trusted Ljotić more than any other ethnic Serb in occupied Yugoslavia. In need of a reliable collaborationist force to combat the Communist uprising that had erupted in the aftermath of the German occupation of Serbia, they gave him permission to form the Serbian Volunteer Detachments in September 1941.

In October, Zbor organized the Grand Anti-Masonic Exhibition in Belgrade with German financial support. The exhibition sought to expose an alleged Judeo-Masonic and Communist conspiracy for world domination through several displays featuring antisemitic propaganda. In December, the Serbian Volunteer Detachments were renamed the Serbian Volunteer Corps (Serbo-Croatian: Srpski dobrovoljački korpus, SDK) and placed under the command of General der Artillerie (lieutenant general) Paul Bader. Although it was not formally part of the Wehrmacht, the SDK received arms, ammunition, food and clothing from the Germans. Its units were not allowed to move from their assigned territory without German authorization. Ljotić himself had no control over the SDK, which was directly commanded by Colonel Kosta Mušicki. Like the Serbian State Guard, it was under the direct command of the Higher SS and Police Leader August Meyszner and the Commanding General in Serbia. During operations, its units were put under the tactical command of German divisions. It was the only group of armed Serbs that the Germans ever trusted during the war, its units often being praised for valour in action by German commanders. The SDK often helped the Gestapo track down and round up Jewish civilians who had managed to evade capture by the Germans and was involved in sending Jewish prisoners to the Banjica concentration camp.

On 15 July 1942, Chetnik leader Draža Mihailović sent a telegram to the Yugoslav government-in-exile asking them to publicly denounce Ljotić, Nedić and the openly collaborationist Chetnik leader Kosta Pećanac as traitors. The Yugoslav government-in-exile responded by doing so publicly over BBC Radio. On 4 October 1944, Ljotić, along with Nedić and about 300 Serbian government officials, escaped from Belgrade with German officials. Ljotić and the SDK arrived in Osijek by the end of October, where German official Hermann Neubacher agreed to arrange their safe passage towards the Slovenian coast. In early 1945, Chetnik leader Pavle Đurišić decided to move to the Ljubljana Gap independent of Mihailović and arranged for Ljotić's forces already in Slovenia to meet him near Bihać in western Bosnia to assist his movement. Between March and April, Ljotić and Mihailović exchanged messages concerning a last-ditch alliance against the Partisans. Although the agreement was reached too late to be of any practical use, the forces of Ljotić and Mihailović came together under the command of Chetnik General Miodrag Damjanović on 27 March.

Ljotić did not live to see the end of the war. He was killed in a car accident in Slovenia on 23 April 1945. In early May, Damjanović led most of the troops under his command into northwestern Italy, where they surrendered to the British and were placed in detention camps. Many were extradited to Yugoslavia, where an estimated 1,500–3,100 were executed by the Partisans and buried in mass graves in the Kočevski Rog plateau. Others immigrated to western countries, where they established émigré organizations intended to promote Zbor's political agenda. Many of Ljotić's followers settled in Munich, where they ran their own publishing house and printed a newspaper called Iskra (Spark). In 1974, Ljotić's brother was shot and killed by agents of the Yugoslav State Security Service (Uprava državne bezbednosti, UDBA). The antagonism between pro-Ljotić groups and those affiliated with the Chetniks continued in exile.

== Bibliography ==
- Byford, Jovan (2008). Denial and Repression of Antisemitism: Post-Communist Remembrance of the Serbian Bishop Nikolaj Velimirović. Budapest: Central European University Press. ISBN 978-963-9776-15-9.
- Byford, Jovan (2011). "Willing Bystanders: Dimitrije Ljotić, "Shield Collaboration" and the Destruction of Serbia's Jews". In Haynes, Rebecca; Rady, Martyn (eds.). In the Shadow of Hitler: Personalities of the Right in Central and Eastern Europe. London: I.B.Tauris. ISBN 978-1-84511-697-2.
- Cohen, Philip J. (1996). Serbia's Secret War: Propaganda and the Deceit of History. College Station, Texas: Texas A&M University Press. ISBN 978-0-89096-760-7.
- Crampton, R.J. (1997). Eastern Europe in the Twentieth Century – And After (2 ed.). London: Routledge. ISBN 0-203-44546-5.
- Dimitrijević, Bojan B. (2014). Vojska Nedićeve Srbije: oružane snage srpske vlade 1941–1945 [The Army of Nedić's Serbia: Serbian Government Armed Forces 1941–1945] (in Serbian). Belgrade, Serbia: Službeni Glasnik. ISBN 978-86-519-1811-0.
- Hockenos, Paul (2003). Homeland Calling: Exile Patriotism and the Balkan Wars. Ithaca, New York: Cornell University Press. ISBN 978-0-8014-4158-5.
- Israeli, Raphael (2013). The Death Camps of Croatia: Visions and Revisions, 1941–1945. New Brunswick, New Jersey: Transaction Publishers. ISBN 978-1-4128-4975-3.
- Kranjc, Gregor Joseph (2013). To Walk with the Devil: Slovene Collaboration and Axis Occupation, 1941–1945. Toronto: University of Toronto Press. ISBN 978-1-4426-1330-0.
- Lampe, John R. (2000). Yugoslavia as History: Twice There Was a Country (2 ed.). Cambridge: Cambridge University Press. ISBN 978-0-521-77401-7.
- Mojzes, Paul (2011). Balkan Genocides: Holocaust and Ethnic Cleansing in the 20th Century. Lanham, Maryland: Rowman & Littlefield. ISBN 978-1-4422-0665-6.
- Payne, Stanley G. (1996). A History of Fascism, 1914–1945. Madison, Wisconsin: University of Wisconsin Press. ISBN 978-0-299-14874-4.
- Pešić, Dimitrije (2008). Roth, Klaus; Brunnbauer, Ulf (eds.). "Magazines as a Way of Maintaining Regional Inter-Ethnic Communication: The Case of Balkan Jewish Periodicals". Ethnologia Balkanica: Region, Regional Identity and Regionalism in Southeastern Europe, Part 1. Berlin: LIT Verlag Münster. ISBN 9783825813871. OCLC 41714232.
- Portmann, Michael (2004). Communist Retaliation and Persecution on Yugoslav Territory During and After WWII (1943–1950). Munich: GRIN Verlag. ISBN 978-3-638-66048-8.
- Pribičević, Ognjen (1999). "The Serbian Radical Right". In Ramet, Sabrina P. (ed.). The Radical Right in Central and Eastern Europe Since 1989. University Park, Pennsylvania: Penn State Press. ISBN 978-0-271-04379-1.
- Ramet, Sabrina P. (2006). The Three Yugoslavias: State-Building and Legitimation, 1918–2005. Bloomington, Indiana: Indiana University Press. ISBN 978-0-253-34656-8.
- Roberts, Walter R. (1987). Tito, Mihailović and the Allies: 1941–1945. New Brunswick, New Jersey: Duke University Press. ISBN 978-0-8223-0773-0.
- Rothschild, Joseph (1974). East Central Europe Between the Two World Wars. Seattle: University of Washington Press. ISBN 978-0-295-80364-7.
- Tomasevich, Jozo (1975). War and Revolution in Yugoslavia, 1941–1945: The Chetniks. Stanford, California: Stanford University Press. ISBN 978-0-8047-0857-9.
- Tomasevich, Jozo (2001). War and Revolution in Yugoslavia, 1941–1945: Occupation and Collaboration. Stanford, California: Stanford University Press. ISBN 978-0-8047-3615-2.
- Vucinich, Wayne S. (1969). "Interwar Yugoslavia". In Vucinich, Wayne S. (ed.). Contemporary Yugoslavia: Twenty Years of Socialist Experiment. Berkeley, California: University of California Press. OCLC 652337606.
