= Yugoslav Action =

- Founded: January 7, 1930
- Dissolved: 1935 (merger)
- Merged into: Yugoslav National Movement
- Headquarters: Belgrade and Zagreb
- Ideology: Yugoslav nationalism Corporatism; Yugoslav irredentism Monarchism; Anti-communism; Anti-capitalism
- Political position: Far-right

Yugoslav Action (Serbo-Croatian: Jugoslovenska akcija, acronymed JA) was a radical Yugoslav nationalist organization that supported an authoritarian corporatist system and a planned economy, active between 1930 and 1935. During its existence it was the most radical Yugoslavist group. The movement was founded on 7 January 1930 in Belgrade, but was based in both Belgrade (in Serbia) and Zagreb (in Croatia), although mainly developed in Croatia. The movement supported King Alexander's royal dictatorship (declared in 1929). The organization was claimed by others to be fascist, though the party itself denied this. It has been described as one of three notable fascist movements, the other being the Association of Fighters of Yugoslavia and the Yugoslav National Movement, that emerged in Yugoslavia in the 1930s, all of whom supported the monarchy, and would reach their zenith during the Axis occupation of Yugoslavia (1941–45). The organization adopted symbols imitating the NSDAP, such as a blue swastika and a raised right hand. It was merged along with other organizations, such as Boj ("Battle") in Slovenia, and groups surrounding the magazines of Zbor ("Council") and Otadžbina ("Homeland") based in Belgrade, and Budjenje ("Awakening") in Zrenjanin, to form the Yugoslav National Movement led by Dimitrije Ljotić in early 1935. The core of the Yugoslav National Movement, also known as "Zbor", was recruited from Yugoslav Action. Zbor played no significant role prior to the German occupation; afterwards, however, it was among the main supporters of the Nazi military administration.

== See also ==
- Organization of Yugoslav Nationalists
- Yugoslav National Movement

== Sources ==
- Payne, Stanley G. (1996). A History of Fascism, 1914–1945. University of Wisconsin Pres. ISBN 978-0-299-14873-7.
- Cohen, Philip J.; Riesman, David (1996). Serbia's Secret War: Propaganda and the Deceit of History. Texas A&M University Press. pp. 12–. ISBN 978-0-89096-760-7.
- Parežanin, Ratko (1971). Drugi svetski rat i Dimitrije V. Ljotić. Iskra.
- Schreiber, Gerhard; Stegemann, Bernd; Vogel, Detlef (1995). Germany and the Second World War. Clarendon Press. pp. 322–. ISBN 978-0-19-822884-4.
- Kardelj, Edvard (1981). Socialist Thought and Practice. Vol. 1–7. p. 52.
