= Boj (beverage) =

Guatemalan beverage

Boj is a sugarcane-based, fermented beverage popular in Guatemala.

== See also ==
- Chicha
- Guaro
