= Josip Torbar (scientist) =

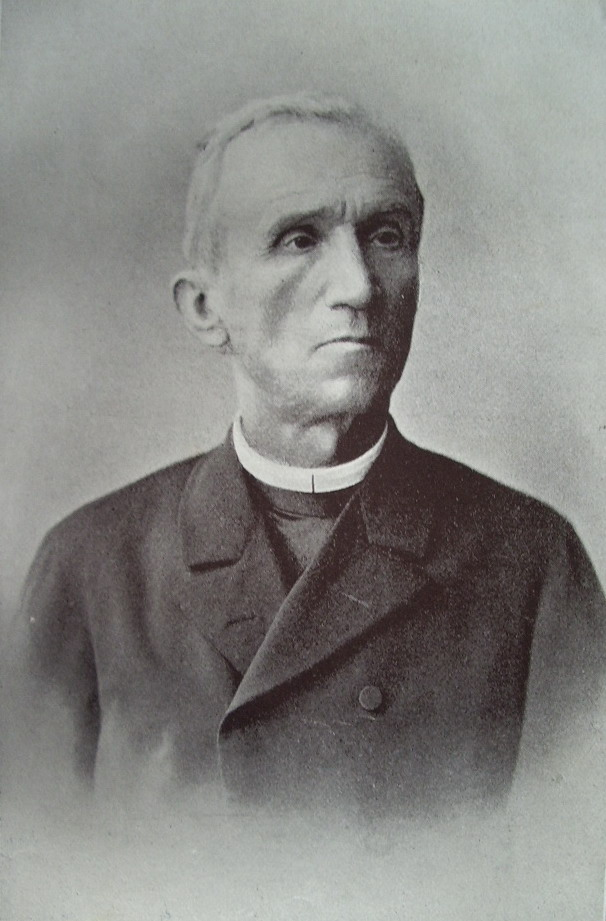
- Born: 1 April 1824; Krašić, Austrian Empire
- Died: 26 July 1900 (aged 76); Zagreb, Kingdom of Croatia-Slavonia, Austria-Hungary
- Scientific career
- Fields: Biology, geology, meteorology and history of science
- Institutions: University of Zagreb, Croatian Academy of Sciences and Arts

Josip Torbar (1824–1900) was a Croatian natural scientist, educator and politician.

Torbar was born in Krašić. He was ordained as a Roman Catholic priest in 1849. His scientific works spanned biology, geology, meteorology, and the history of science.

In 1866 Torbar became one of 12 original members of the Yugoslav Academy of Sciences and Arts, and served as its chairman from 1890 until his death. He was a co-founder and the president of the Croatian Mountaineering Association.

== Sources ==
- Josip Torbar (1824.-1900.) (in Croatian)
- Zagreb moj grad, issue 8, p. 24 (in Croatian)

Academic offices
| Preceded by Pavao Muhić | Chairman of the Yugoslav Academy of Sciences and Arts; 1890–1900 | Succeeded by Tadija Smičiklas |
