= Josip Torbar (politician, born 1922) =

Croatian politician (1922–2013)

Josip Torbar (24 June 1922 – 6 July 2013) was a Croatian politician.

Torbar was born in Zagreb and obtained his doctorate at the University of Zagreb Faculty of Law. He left Yugoslavia after communism was instituted following World War II, and lived in South America, the US and later in Rome. In 1980 he was elected vice-president of the central committee of the Croatian Peasant Party. After the death of Juraj Krnjević in 1988, he served as president of the central committee until 1991. Torbar returned to Croatia in 1993, and was named an honorary president of the Croatian Peasant Party in 1996. He was elected to the Croatian Parliament in the 2000 elections. He was a member of the Parliamentary Assembly of the Council of Europe from 2002 to 2004.
