= Juraj Demetrović =

Croatian politician (1885–1945)

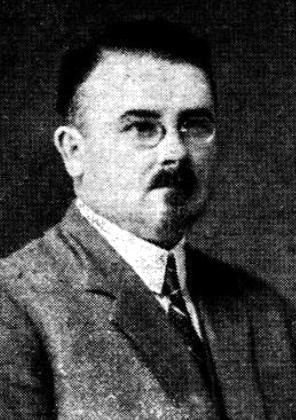

Personal details
- Born: Juraj Demetrović; 1885
- Died: 1945 (aged 69/70)
- Party: Yugoslav Democratic Party (1920-1925); Independent Democratic Party (1925-1929)

Juraj Demetrović (1885 - 1945) was a Croatian politician. He was also the editor of the periodical Hrvatska njiva.

He served as provincial commissioner for Croatia from July 3, 1921 to December 23, 1922. Demetrović was Yugoslavia's minister of Commerce & Industry from January 1, 1930 to April 4, 1932. He was subsequently minister of Agriculture & Agrarian Reform from April 4, 1932 to July 3, 1932 and again from November 5, 1932 to January 27, 1934. From January 27, 1934 to December 22, 1934 as minister of both Commerce & Industry and Mines & Forests.

Demetrović spent World War II in occupied Belgrade. He was executed for collaboration in Yugoslavia in 1945.

== See also ==
- Independent Democratic Party
