= Association of Fighters of Yugoslavia =

1930s nationalist organization

The Association of Fighters of Yugoslavia (Slovene: Združenje borcev Jugoslavije), known as Boj (an abbreviation, also meaning "battle"; members were known as Serbo-Croatian: Bojovnici), was a Yugoslav nationalist organization in the Drava Banovina (Slovenia) of the Kingdom of Yugoslavia, active between 1930 and 1935. It was established in 1929 as the Union of Slovene Soldiers (Zveza slovenskih vojakov), then renamed in 1930 to Union of Fighters (Zveza bojevnikov). The movement supported King Alexander's royal dictatorship (declared in 1929). It was approved by the Drava Banovina administration in 1931. In late 1933, the organization was renamed as the "Association of Fighters of Yugoslavia" (Združenje borcev Jugoslavije). It was merged along with other organizations, such as Yugoslav Action that was based mainly in Croatia, and groups surrounding the magazines of Zbor ("Council") and Otadžbina ("Homeland") based in Belgrade, and Budjenje ("Awakening") in Zrenjanin, to form the Yugoslav National Movement led by Dimitrije Ljotić in early 1935.

== See also ==
- Blue Guard (Slovene)

== Sources ==
- Cohen, Philip J.; Riesman, David (1996). Serbia's Secret War: Propaganda and the Deceit of History. Texas A&M University Press. pp. 12–. ISBN 978-0-89096-760-7.
- Kardelj, Edvard (1981). Socialist Thought and Practice. Vol. 1–7. p. 52.
