= 1861 Dalmatian parliamentary election =

Parliamentary elections were held in Kingdom of Dalmatia for the newly formed Dalmatian parliament in 1861.

== Results ==
Party	Seats
Autonomist Party	29
People's Party	12
Total	41

== Elected representatives ==
=== Autonomist Party ===
From Zadar

- Vittorio Bioni
- Cosimo de Begna Possedaria
- Vincenzo Duplancich
- Antonio Smirich (from 1863: Giovanni Salghetti-Drioli)
- Antonio Bajamonti
- Spiro Petrović
- Natale Filippi
- Giacomo Ghiglianovich
- Francesco Borreli

From Split

- Leonardo Dudan
- Giorgio Giovannizio
- Luigi Lapenna
- Vincenzo degli Alberti

From Šibenik

- Antonio Galvani

From Makarska

- Giacomo Vucovich

From Dubrovnik

- Giovanni Radmilli
- Luigi Serragli

From Korčula

- Giovanni Smerchinich

From Hvar

- Girolamo Macchiedo
- Giovanni Macchiedo
- Girolamo Vusio

From Skradin

- Simeone Bujas
- Giovanni Marasović

From Drniš

- Melchiorre Difnico

From Trogir

- Antonio Radman
- Antonio Fanfogna

From Sinj

- Josip Dešković
- Anton Buljan

From Imotski

- Niccolò Mirossevich

=== People's Party ===
From Dubrovnik

- Miho Klaić
- Marino Giorni

From Kotor

- Josip Gjurović (from 1863 Kosta Vojnović)
- Bernardo Verona (from 1863 Josip Banović-Damianović)

From Benkovac

- Petar Radulović

From Drniš

- Pane Sablić
- Kristo Kulišić

From Vrgorac

- Miho Pavlinović

From Cavtat

- Djure Pulić

From Ston

- Krsto Jerković

From Budva

- Luka Tripcović
- Stjepan Mitrov Ljubiša
