= Lovro Monti =

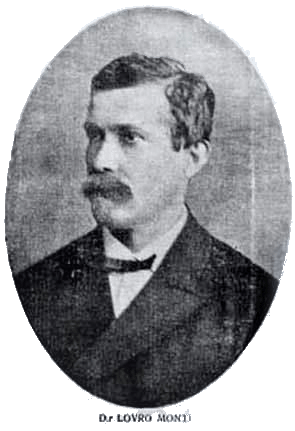
Lovro Monti

Lovro (Lorenzo) Monti (21 April 1835, in Knin – 9 April 1898) was a Dalmatian politician of Italian descent. He was a Dalmatian Italian, whose grandfather fought for the Republic of Venice against Napoleon.

== Biography ==
In 1859 Monti graduated from law school in Padua (which was then in the Austrian Empire), and lately worked as an apprentice in Split for a while. Along with Miho Klaić, Natko Nodilo (another Dalmatian Italian), Mihovil Pavlinović, lawyers Stjepan Mitrov Ljubiša and Konstantin Vojnović, Monti was one of the founders of the People's Party (″Narodna stranka") in Dalmatia, and the Illyrian movement.

Beginning in 1862 Monti worked in Knin as a lawyer, and in 1866 he became the president of the municipality. He has been elected as a deputy in the Dalmatian assembly five times in a row. On the first direct election he became a deputy in a royal council (and was reelected in 1879). He was also one of the leaders and founders of the Italo-Serbian coalition in Dalmatia.

In 1874 Monti defended the rights of the Italians of Dalmatia declaring in the Dalmatian assembly that half of the 98,000 population of the Dalmatian cities spoke Italian and needed Italian schools.

In 1882, due to the dissatisfaction of the new policy of "Narodna Stranka" against the Italians and Serbs in Dalmatia, he resigned from the public life.

Lovro Monti died in Knin in 1898.

== Achievements and legacy ==
During his mandate he developed Knin and the surrounding area, especially in agriculture.

In his will he left to the Knin municipality his farm, later called "Montova glavica" with the condition that an agricultural school would be founded there.

During SFRY, the real estate was divided and some leaders of the Knin municipality got assigned for themselves the construction yards. The school has never been named after him. Monti belonged to the rich "class of gentlemen" and, according to the communist criteria of that time, would have been considered an "heresy" to name a school after him.

However, there has been made a monument in front of the school on his honor.

== See also ==
- Dalmatian Italians
- Knin
- History of Dalmatia
