= Sava Bjelanović =

Dalmatian politician and journalist

Personal details
- Born: October 15, 1850 Đevrske near Knin, Austrian Empire
- Died: 1897 (aged 46–47) Zadar, Austria-Hungary
- Citizenship: Austro-Hungarian
- Party: Serb People's Party (Dalmatia)
- Education: University of Vienna
- Profession: journalist, politician

Sava Bjelanović (Serbian Cyrillic: Сава Бјелановић; 15 October 1850 – 1897) was a Dalmatian journalist and politician, the leader of the Serb People's Party in Dalmatia and one of the most prominent Dalmatian Serbs of the 19th century. As a writer, he represented a classical reaction against decadent romanticism in literature and an anticlerical rationalism in general thought. As a politician he represented Serbs of both Eastern Orthodox and Roman Catholic denominations in the Diet of Dalmatia.

== Biography ==
Bjelanović was born at Đevrske near Knin in Dalmatia. He completed his elementary and high school education in Italian in Zadar, the then capital of Dalmatia. He became a member of the United Serbian Youth. He was involved in the literary group Prvenac in Zadar and as a student, he began to appear in the Novi Sad periodical Zastava and the Trieste newspaper Cittadino. He later worked with Zastava as a correspondent. He studied law at the University of Vienna, and returned home in 1880 to open his practice in Zadar. Although trained in law, Bjelanović decided to make a career in literary journalism and politics. He spent the next seventeen years battling injustices and championing human rights among his people.

In 1880 Bjelanović established the newspaper Srpski list (Serbian News). Later he formed the Srpski glas newspaper (Serbian Voice) which was seen as a continuation of Srpski list which was suppressed in 1888. Both newspapers were very popular and influential. While principal theoreticians of Orthodox clericism, particularly Nikodim Milaš, tried to identify Serbs with Orthodoxy, Bjelanović, leader of the Serbian National Party of the Littoral, propagated interreligious equality, launching among the popular masses in Dalmatia the slogan "Love your brother irrespective of his religion". His editorials were widely read for his fearless attacks on the unwisdom of Austrian policy and the injustices done by the Austrian authorities to all Dalmatian citizens.

Following a split of the People's Party, Bjelanović founded the Serb People's Party in Dalmatia. In 1883, he was elected in the Dalmatian parliament. From 1883 to 1889, he represented the electoral district of Benkovac, Obrovac and Kistanje in the curia of foreign municipalities in the Dalmatian Parliament, and from 1889 to 1895, the electoral district of Drniš, Knin and Vrliku in the curia of chambers of commerce and crafts. The greatest success of his political party was the 1890 election in Dubrovnik, where his party won a decisive victory.

Initially an advocate of Serbian nationalism in his youth, Bjelanović gradually became closer to Croatian politicians in Dalmatia, leading to the Zadar compromise between Croatian and Serbian politicians in 1888. He evolved towards Yugoslavism and came to represent the left-wing branch of his party.

Overall, he was influential in awakening and spreading Serbian national consciousness in Dalmatia. He was one of the co-founders of the Dalmatian Lazarica Serbian Orthodox Church and headed regularly its Vidovdan (Saint Vitus's Day) councils. He died in the city where he spent most of his life—Zadar—in 1897. He was buried in his birth village of Đevrske near Knin.

Bjelanović was a contemporary of well-known Dalmatian politicians, members of the Serb-Italian Autonomist Party coalition, and writers such as Đorđe Vojnović, Konstantin Vojnović, Dušan Baljak, Luigi Lapenna, Antonio Bajamonti, Roberto Ghiglianovich, Francesco Ghetaldi-Gondola, Niccolò Trigari, Luigi Ziliotto, and Marko Car, his biographer.

== Literary work ==
He is best known for Kroz Slavenske Zemlje (Through the Slavic Lands), published in Zadar in 1897. In that book he writes about the time he rode in a railway carriage full of Hungarians, wondering why his fellow traveller, who has just been proclaiming Russia the enemy of civilization, is so unwilling to admit he is ethnically a German.

== Sources ==
- Skerlić, Jovan (1921). Istorija nove Srpske književnosti. Gec Kon Beograd.
