= Gajo Bulat =

Croatian politician

Gajo Filomen Bulat
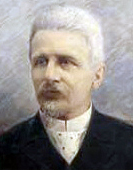

Mayor of Split
- In office 1885–1893
- Preceded by: Dujam Rendić-Miočević
- Succeeded by: Ivan Mangjer

Personal details
- Born: 4 January 1836 Supetar, Dalmatia, Austrian Empire
- Died: 9 June 1900 (aged 64) Vienna, Austria-Hungary
- Party: People's Party
- Relatives: Gajo Bulat (nephew)
- Education: University of Graz; University of Padua
- Occupation: Politician
- Profession: Attorney at law

Gajo Filomen Bulat (4 January 1836 – 9 June 1900) was a Croatian lawyer who served as the mayor of Split and as a member of the Diet of Dalmatia and the Imperial Council of the Austrian Empire.

== Biography ==
Gajo Bulat was born on 4 January 1836 in Supetar. His father Francis was a judge. He attended high school in Zadar and then studied at the University of Graz and the University of Padua. After earning a doctorate in law he became a secretary for the Chamber of Commerce in Zadar. He then devoted himself to a lawyer's career and between 1865 and 1879 he was one of the most distinguished lawyers in Split.

He was raised in an Italian cultural environment, but under the influence of Miho Klaić he became a supporter of the Croatian national idea and the leader of the People's Party in Split. He opposed the Autonomist Party and won an election against its candidate Antonio Bajamonti.

On 28 June 1882, in the constituting session of the Split Municipal Council, Bulat was made the city's mayor. From 1885 to 1893, he was the Mayor of Split and a member of the Dalmatian Parliament and the Vienna Imperial Council.

He fought for the introduction of Croatian in schools and the railway connecting Split with Croatian Slavonia. A historian Dr. Rudolf Horvat writes, "his merit into the municipal government, school and society, and what is built the Croatian Theater ". Bulat started a newspaper The People (Narod) and was one of the contributors of the cultural-educational societies "Slavs progress" and "Zvonimir". His People's Party contributed much of the Croatian national awakening of consciousness and defeating the Autonomist. In 1890, Gajo Bulat officially opened monumental fountain known as the Split, Bajamonti fountain.

Gajo Bulat died of a heart attack in Vienna on 9 June 1900 in the middle of parliamentary work. He was buried in Split with great honor, as a great fighter for Croatian ideas and unity of all Croatian area from the Adriatic to the Drava River.

Political offices
Preceded by Dujam Rendić-Miočević	Mayor of Split; 1885–1893	Succeeded by Ivan Mangjer
