= Mihovil Pavlinović =

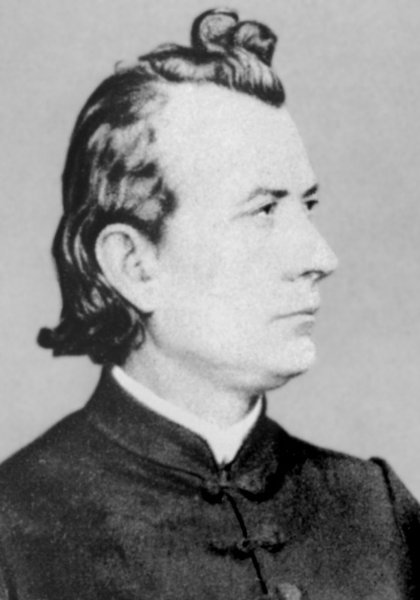

Member of Diet of Dalmatia (Three terms)
- In office 1861–1887

Member of Croatian parliament
- In office 1865–1867

Member of Imperial Council
- In office 1873–1879

Personal details
- Born: 28 January 1831 Podgora, Austrian Empire (now: Croatia)
- Died: 18 May 1887 (aged 56) Podgora, Austria-Hungary (now: Croatia)
- Party: People's Party (1861–1887)
- Occupation: Politician
- Profession: Priest, writer
- Ordination: 23 September 1854

Mihovil Pavlinović (28 January 1831 – 18 May 1887) was a Croatian Roman Catholic priest, politician, and writer who led Croatian National Revival in the Kingdom of Dalmatia. He is known as a keen promoter of Croatian political thought in Dalmatia, one of the founders of the liberal People's Party and consistent advocate of unification of Kingdom of Dalmatia and Kingdom of Croatia-Slavonia.

== Early life and education ==
Mihovil Pavlinović was born in a small village of Podgora near Makarska on January 28, 1831, in a prominent peasant family. He finished primary school in Podgora, after which he attended minor seminary in Split where he finished gymnasium. He studied theology at the Major seminary in Zadar from which he graduated in 1854. During his time in seminary, Pavlinović began to take interest in the Illyrian movement. He and his friend Luka Botić (who later also become a prominent writer and politician) founded students' society Pobratimi. Pavlinović was ordained to the priesthood on September 23, 1854, in the ceremony in Split Cathedral.

== Career ==
After ordination, Pavlinović shortly served as vicar in Drašnice. From 1855 to 1870, a time period during which he was entirely dedicated to political and literary work, he was officially vicar in Podgora. While traveling through his homeland, he had a chance to see all the difficulties that Croatian people had, such as the fact that all administration offices, municipalities, and schools were run by foreigners.

== Political activities ==
Pavlinović entered politics after the failure of Bach's absolutism (1850-1859), which is known in Croatia as a period of centralization and Germanization. In August 1860, he became the first prominent Croat in Dalmatia who publicly spoke about the unification of Dalmatia and Croatia-Slavonia. In 1861, Pavlinović, among others, founded People's Party as a Dalmatian branch of the People's Party in Kingdom of Croatia-Slavonia, and as opposition to Autonomist Party. Having acquired a wide favor, Pavlinović was elected as a member of Diet of Dalmatia on 1861 elections. As a member of Parliament he held a speech in Croatian which sparked protests. It was later decided because of this that MPs could also speak Croatian, which was a great success of People Party considering the immeasurably greater number of Autonomist Party MP's. On March 1, 1862, Pavlinović and his associates started publishing newspaper Narodni list as a Croatian-language part of the Italian-language newspaper Il Nazionale, periodico politico e letterario. Pavlinović was publishing articles intended to awake national consciousness of the Croatian people in Dalmatia. He was also writing for many other newspapers and magazines including Glasnik dalmatinski, Iskra, La Dalmazia cattolica, Narodni koledar, Obzor, Pozor, Vijenac, and Zatočnik. On 1865 Croatian parliamentary election, Pavlinović was elected to the Parliament. On 1873 Cisleithanian legislative election he was elected to the Imperial Council. During his term, he came into conflict with Serbian politician Stjepan Mitrov Ljubiša because of Ljubiša's anti-Croatian stands. He was speaking Croatian in both, Croatian, and Imperial Parliament.

== 1873 election ==
Within the People's Party, Mihovil Klaić quickly came into conflict with Pavlinović, though Pavlinović eventually gave up on enforcing his views over the entire party and privately rejected the Interconfessional laws that the German liberals had passed in 1868, 1869 and 1874, which strengthened the powers of state over those of the church.

== 1875 election ==
In the majority Serbian district of Obrovac, which had voted for the Zemljaci in 1873, a feeling of betrayal prevailed after certain political decisions by the now-ruling People's Party, including a lack of fulfilment of certain promises made by Klaić. (Note: "Srbi Obrovački opaziše od godine 1873 na 1874 da se baš neizvršuje prema Srbima ono što je D.r Klaić obećao i poštenom rieči ujamčio") After a series of meetings held in the Krka monastery from October 1873 to February 1874 under the leadership of Vladimir Desnica, Vladimir Simić, Nikodim Milaš, Ljubomir Vujnović and Bogoljub Petranović. (Note: At the time, Petranović in the service of the Hamesništvo of the Kingdom of Serbia in Bosnia, though this relationship was discontinued following the Congress of Berlin.) It drew up a list of demands from Mihovil Klaić, seeking from him an affirmation of the equality of the Serbian ethnonym, language and script, the removal of "clericals" (Note: Catholic priests of Anti-Orthodox sentiment) from the party's mouthpiece, Narodni list and the introduction of Cyrillic into public schools as a sign of Pan-Slavic reciprocity. The demands did not represent an ultimatum, being under the influence of the more pragmatic Vladimir Simić. Similar demands had been made to Klaić in a private letter likely from Simić before the 1873 election, (Note: To which he promised among other things that Narodni list would not "publish anything insulting against the Serbs" (Serbo-Croatian: nedonese ništa uvrednoga protiv Srbâ).) and in response to the 1874 demands he replied publicly in Narodni list.

== 1877 election ==
On 29 January 1877, Stjepan Mitrov Ljubiša gave a speech before the Diet of Dalmatia in which openly opposed the unification of Dalmatia with Croatia-Slavonia. With the assent of Klaić, with whom Ljubiša had a personal feud, the decision was made in the People's Party to target Ljubiša. They had the verification commission annul Ljubiša's election on the grounds that one of his voters had not yet been of age. The People's Party, in the majority, accepted the proposal. In his final address, Ljubiša held a speech accusing the People's Party of religious and ethnic intolerance, declaring that the Serbian national movement would work independently in the future. Shortly thereafter, Nikodim Milaš published an article in Glas Crnogorca calling for the foundation of a separate Serbian party in Dalmatia with its own media outlet, because of the loss of confidence of the Serbs in the People's Party. The result was a lasting exchange of polemics between Narodni list representing the Croats with Pavlinović at their head and Glas Crnogorca and Zastava representing the Serbs with Milaš at their head.

== 1879 election ==
On the Bosnian question of the 1870s in the leadup to the Austro-Hungarian campaign of 1878, two opposite opinions on the fate of the Bosnian vilayet formed in the Diet of Dalmatia. Pavlinović led the People's Party in arguing it ought to be annexed by Austria-Hungary, and then given to the Croatian element of the Triune Kingdom they desired. Klaić, still a People's Party candidate but increasingly intermediate between the Party norm and the Slavic wing of the Autonomist Party, preferred a Serbian annexation of Bosnia and eventually of the same territory the People's Party wanted for their Kingdom of Croatia, including Dalmatia.

After the Austrian occupation of Bosnia, however, Klaić accepted the change as a done deal. During the elections in July 1879, Klaić ran as a People's Party candidate for the electoral district Zadar-Pag-Benkovac-Obrovac. Zadar remained the last stronghold of the Autonomist Party, leaving the Serbian voters of Benkovac and Obrovac with the decisive vote. The election became especially contentious in Obrovac, where the Serbs refused to accept the program of the People's Party to unite all four, and now five, kingdoms, into a single "Croatian" kingdom, which Sava Bjelanović would later term the "Quintune" kingdom (Serbian: Petojednica), referring to Bosnia, Slavonia, Croatia, Fiume (or part of the Austrian Littoral) and Dalmatia. Some compromise-leaning Serbs proposed Manfred Borelli or Jovo Medović run instead of Klaić. Pavlinović proposed the municipal administrator (Serbo-Croatian: općinski načelnik) of Obrovac, Vladimir Simić, run. This would have been just to prevent the development of a Serb-Autonomist coalition, but such a coalition was already forming. The Autonomists decided to run Gustav Ivanić against Klaić, as Ivanić was a son-in-law of the Zadar Autonomist leader Nicolò Trigari. Ivanić signed a list of demands from the Serbs, including the rejection of uniting Dalmatia with Croatia-Slavonia and the recognition of the Serbs as an independent ethnicity. Even with Klaić, the People's Party was unwilling to match Ivanić's demands, and lost the election in December. It was the first loss of many to the new Italo-Serbian coalition, and this gained the Autonomists a majority in the Diet of Dalmatia. Many Croats of the People's Party then accused the Serbs of treachery.

Upon the foundation of the Serbian Party, Klaić took a relatively mild stance against it for a Croat politician, as he considered it likely to dissipate over time, without support from the government at any level. For this reason, he considered it prudent to simply ignore the party. Following this advice, the Narodni list paid only peripheral attention to the Serbian Party in 1880 and 1881, and generally within the scope of attacks on the Autonomists. Pavlinović ended this at the end of 1881 with a polemic directed against Sava Bjelanović, because Bjelanović had signed a letter of criticism of Pavlinović as a "Catholic Serb", to which Pavlinović responded with accusing Bjelanović of trying to convert Catholic Slavs to Serbdom.

Soon after, Srpski list was founded to represent the new Serbian party. It directed most of its criticism against Pavlinović, while deriding Klaić's liberal wing as Pavlinović's "subjects" (Serbian: podložnici). Sava Bjelanović led a liberal Serbian wing, often supported by Serbian Eastern Catholics, especially in Dubrovnik. Bjelanović's death in 1897 led to a schism within the Serbian Party between conservatives and liberal-radicals.

Pavlinović's long-term struggle for Croatian resulted in the introduction of Croatian as an official language in all Dalmatian state offices in year 1883.

== Ethnicity ==
In his youth, after the fall of the Illyrian movement in the early 1850s, Pavlinović accepted Serbian national consciousness, thrilled with Serbia who was at the time fighting against Ottoman Empire for liberation and unification in Revolution. He and many other seminarians from Zadar seminary, including Natko Nodilo and Luka Botić, were so impressed with Serbia that they wanted to move there, believing they would be able to develop their capabilities there and thus be of the greatest benefit to Croats. Pavlinović and his friend Jovan Sundečić embarked in 1864 on a tour to South Slavic (soon to be called Yugoslav) cities with the aim of creating a fraternal union. For a period of time, he was an editor of the Montenegrin yearbook Orlić. However, after Luka Botić visited Serbia in 1868, he returned to Croatia very disappointed with what he saw there. This led to Pavlinović and his friends abandoning the idea of Serbia being a "South Slavic Piedmont", and accepting that Croatia and Serbia should stay separated.

Pavlinović defined the program of the People's Party in Dalmatia, that was published in 1869, as a program that should be implemented in the whole of Croatia, and not only in Dalmatia. Program consisted of principles of independence and integrity of Croatia and the adoption of Croatian constitution. While People's Party in the Kingdom of Croatia-Slavonia still had an indefinite transnational name so they would not resent the Serbs because of their shared ideas, Pavlinović thought that "Serbs want to take homeland from Croats", so he used only attributes "Croatian" rather than "Yugoslav" or "Illyrian" in the program.

== List of works ==
Pavlinović's literary work followed his basic political ideas, so he used his works to rise national awareness of Croats in Dalmatia.

- 1865 Ognjišar
- 1867 Districts and management of parishes (Kotari i župnikovanje)
- 1873 Songs and sermons 1860-1872 (Pjesme i besjede 1860-1872)
- 1875 Croatian thoughts (Hrvatski razmišljaji)
- 1875 Various writings (Različiti spisi)
- 1876 Croatian conversations (Hrvatski razgovori)
- 1876 Folk writings (Pučki spisi)
- 1879 People's songbook (Narodna pjesmarica)
- 1882 Croatian and Serbian thought in Dalmatia from 1848 to 1882 (Misao hrvatska i misao srbska u Dalmaciji od godine 1848. do godine 1882.)
- 1888 Paths 1867-1875 (Puti 1867-1875)

In addition, Pavlinović donated to Matica hrvatska 211 proverbs from Istria and Littoral, as well as 4000-5000 words to the Croatian Academy of Sciences and Arts for its Dictionary.

== Bibliography ==
- Rajčić, Tihomir (2005-11-01). "Srpski nacionalni pokret u Dalmaciji u XIX. stoljeću" [The Serbian National Movement in Dalmatia in the XIXth Century]. Radovi Zavoda za povijesne znanosti HAZU u Zadru (in Serbo-Croatian) (47): 341–361. ISSN 1330-0474.
- Rajčić, Tihomir (2001-10-19). "Odnos Srpskog lista (glasa) prema autonomašima u Dalmaciji 80-ih godina XIX. stoljeća" [The Behaviour of the Serbian Party Towards the Dalmatian Autonomists in Austrian Dalmatia]. Radovi Zavoda za povijesne znanosti HAZU u Zadru (in Serbo-Croatian) (43): 375–388. ISSN 1330-0474.
- Macan, Trpimir (1979). "Suradnja i sukobi Mihovila Klaića i Stefana Mitrova Ljubiše". Historijski zbornik. 31–32 (31–32) (published 1980-01-10): 151–163. ISSN 0351-2193.
- "Na izjavu Bukovačkih Srba II". Narodni list. Vol. 18, no. 63. 1879-08-13. pp. 1–3.
