= Frari (surname) =

Frari is a surname. Notable people with the surname include:

- Angelo Antonio Frari (1780–1865), Dalmatian physician
- Michele Carlo Frari (1813–1896), professor of obstetrics
- Luigi Frari (1813–1898), physician and political activist
