= 1908 Dalmatian parliamentary election =

- 26, 28 and 31 October 1908
- All 43 seats in the Diet of Dalmatia
Party	Seats	+/–
Croatian Party	22	+4
Party of Rights	8	−1
Serb People's Party	7	+1
Autonomist Party	6	0
This lists parties that won seats. See the complete results below.

Parliamentary election were held in the Kingdom of Dalmatia on 26, 28 and 31 October 1908. They were the tenth and last to elect representatives to the Dalmatian parliament in Zadar, as World War I broke out before the end of the parliamentary term in 1915. The parliament was eventually abandoned and no new government was elected before Dalmatia became a part of the State of Slovenes, Croats and Serbs, and later the Kingdom of Serbs, Croats and Slovenes.

== Results ==
Party	Seats	+/–
Croatian Party	22	+4
Party of Rights	8	–1
Serb People's Party	7	+1
Autonomist Party	6	0
Total	43	+2
