= House of Bajamonti =

Coat-of-arms of the House of Bajamonti.

The Bajamonti family are considered one of the most prestigious families of the city of Split in Croatia. The family originated in Bergamo, Lombardy.

The Bajamonti family has been mentioned for the first time in Split Registry Books at the beginning of the 18th century (1704) as owners of a very rich library collection. The first data about the library had been recorded by Julije Bajamonti (Giulio Bajamonti) (1744–1800), registering that the big fire of 1787 had seriously damaged the collection. Until recently, the public has only been acquainted with a few titles preserved by the Split Archeological Museum Library.

Recent research of the Rara Collection in the University Library of Split resulted in the discovery of thirty-two titles collected in fifty-one volumes and in fact bearing the exlibris signatures of Gian Domenico and Girolamo Bajamonti or in some cases signed just Bajamonti. The titles cover the topics ranging from grammar, philosophy, classical and Italian literature, theology, natural sciences, as well as a vast collection of legal books - primarily focusing on the Church and Civil Law. There are also numerous works by German and Italian authors from the field of natural law. The originals had been written in Italian and Latin, although the collection also includes translations from French and Latin into Italian. The books had been printed in Italy, Germany, Switzerland and France, and are dating from the 16th century (two titles), the 17th century (two titles), the 18th century (25 titles), and only one dating from the first half of the 19th century. Seven works from the Bajamonti collection had been a gift from the Split ecclesiaste Mate Bogetić, while five titles from the family collection had been passed down to the Gabinetto di lettura collection, to be returned later along with the other titles to the University Library of Split.

Antonio Bajamonti

The most famous Bajamonti was Antonio Bajamonti (Split, 19 February 1822 - Split, 13 January 1891), who became mayor of Split in 1860 for the Autonomist Party (pro-Italian) and - except for a brief interruption during the period 1864-65 - held the post for over two decades until 1880. Bajamonti was also a member of the Parliament of Dalmatia (1861–91) and the Austrian Chamber of Deputies (1867–70 and 1873–79). He married Lujza Krušević.

== Sources ==
Vjesnik bibliotekara Hrvatske ISSN 0507-1925
