= Đorđe Vojnović =

Serbian politician

President of the Diet of Dalmatia
- In office 1877–1895
- Preceded by: Stjepan Mitrov Ljubiša
- Succeeded by: Miho Klaić

Personal details
- Born: September 26, 1833 Herceg Novi, Austrian Empire
- Died: September 11, 1895 (aged 61)
- Citizenship: Austro-Hungarian
- Party: Serb People's Party
- Profession: politician

Đorđe Vojnović (26 September 1833 – 11 September 1895) was a Serbian politician.

== Biography ==
Vojnović was born in the noble House of Vojnović from Herceg Novi, as the son of Jovan Đorđev Vojnović and Katarina Gojković.

He was, alongside his brother Konstantin Vojnović, educated in Dubrovnik, where they both converted to Roman Catholicism in ca. 1850. After studying law in Vienna and in Padua, he relocated to Herceg Novi where he served as mayor from 1863 to 1877.

Đorđe Vojnović was initially a member of the People's Party. He was deputy speaker of the Diet of Dalmatia from 1870 to 1876, before becoming speaker in 1877. He also became one of the founders of the Serbian People's Party in 1879.

Vojnović eventually returned to Serbian Orthodoxy.

From 1884, he was Commander of the Franz Joseph Order and also served as Vice President of the Dalmatian Red Cross State Relief Association.

He married an Italian woman of the Martinelli clan hailing from Trogir. The couple had three children: Dušan, Ljubica and Darinka.
