= 1876 Dalmatian parliamentary election =

Parliamentary elections were held in the Kingdom of Dalmatia in 1876. The People's Party won with a record-largest majority of 30 seats in the 41 seat assembly. During the course of the government's mandate, Serb members of the People's Party formed their own Serb Party.

== Results ==
Party	Seats	+/–
People's Party	30	+4
Autonomist Party	11	–5
Total	41	–1
