= Podgora, Split-Dalmatia County =

Municipality in Split-Dalmatia County, Croatia

Podgora
- Municipality
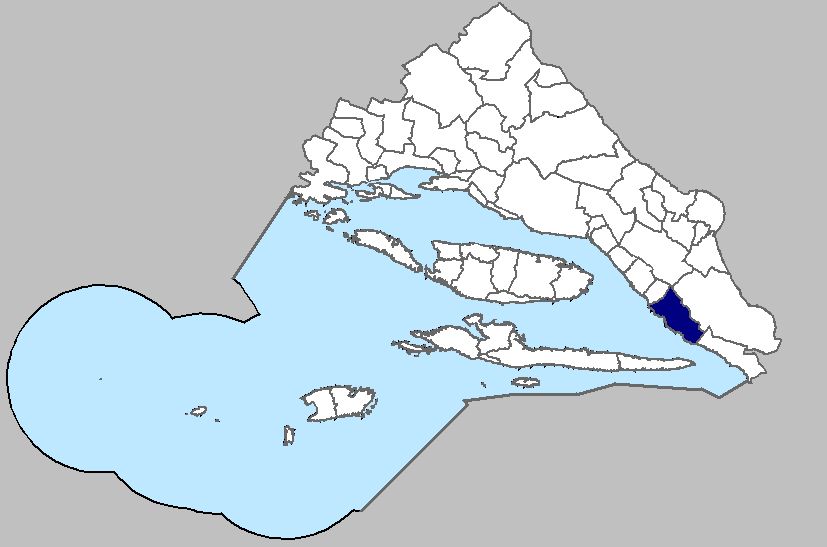
- Podgora municipality within the Split-Dalmatia County
- Interactive map of Podgora
- Location of Podgora in Croatia
- Coordinates: 43°14′N 17°05′E
- Country: Croatia
- Region: Dalmatia
- County: Split-Dalmatia County

Area
  - Municipality: 76.2 km^{2} (29.4 sq mi)
  - Urban: 28.4 km^{2} (11.0 sq mi)

Population (2021)
  - Municipality: 2,233
  - Density: 29.3/km^{2} (75.9/sq mi)
  - Urban: 1,181
  - Urban density: 41.6/km^{2} (108/sq mi)
- Website: podgora.hr

Podgora (pronounced [pôdɡora]) is a town in the Split-Dalmatia County of Croatia. It is located on the Adriatic coastline of Dalmatia, 65 km south of Split and 135 km north of Dubrovnik. Podgora has a largely tourism-based economy. With its five hotels, it has four times as many beds as inhabitants.

== Population ==
In 2021, the municipality had 2233 residents in the following 5 settlements:

- Drašnice, population 286
- Gornje Igrane, population 3
- Igrane, population 347
- Podgora, population 1,181
- Živogošće, population 416
Podgora: Population trends 1857–2021
v

population	2831	3252	3450	4161	4172	4462	4123	3759	3263	3054	2646	2503	2371	2687	2884	2518	2233
	1857	1869	1880	1890	1900	1910	1921	1931	1948	1953	1961	1971	1981	1991	2001	2011	2021

Sources: Croatian Bureau of Statistics publications

== History ==
Podgora was inhabited as early as the Middle Ages. At the end of the 15th century, it came under Ottoman rule along with the Primorje Region. The first written mention from 1571 testifies to its coming under Venetian protection after the Ottoman defeat at the Battle of Lepanto. The area was often the scene of conflict: during the Candian War in the mid-17th century, the people of Podgora sided with the Venetians, and fighting continued into the early 18th century. Devastated by the conflicts, it was settled by people from the Imotski Region and Herzegovina in 1817.

In the Ottoman pashaluk censuses in 1624 and 1690, 80 and 125 houses respectively were recorded. An 1828 status animarum recorded 955 inhabitants living in 194 family households.

Podgora is the birthplace of Don Mihovil Pavlinović, a priest, politician and writer, best known as the first person to speak Croatian in the Dalmatian parliament, seeking the unification of Dalmatia and Croatia.

Organized tourism started in Podgora in 1922, when the first hotel "Praha" was built.

During World War II, on September 10, 1942, the Yugoslav Partisans formed the Partisan Navy in Podgora. In 1962, president Josip Broz Tito unveiled a monument on a hill above the port of Podgora, The wings of a seagull, in remembrance of World War II events.

== Gallery ==
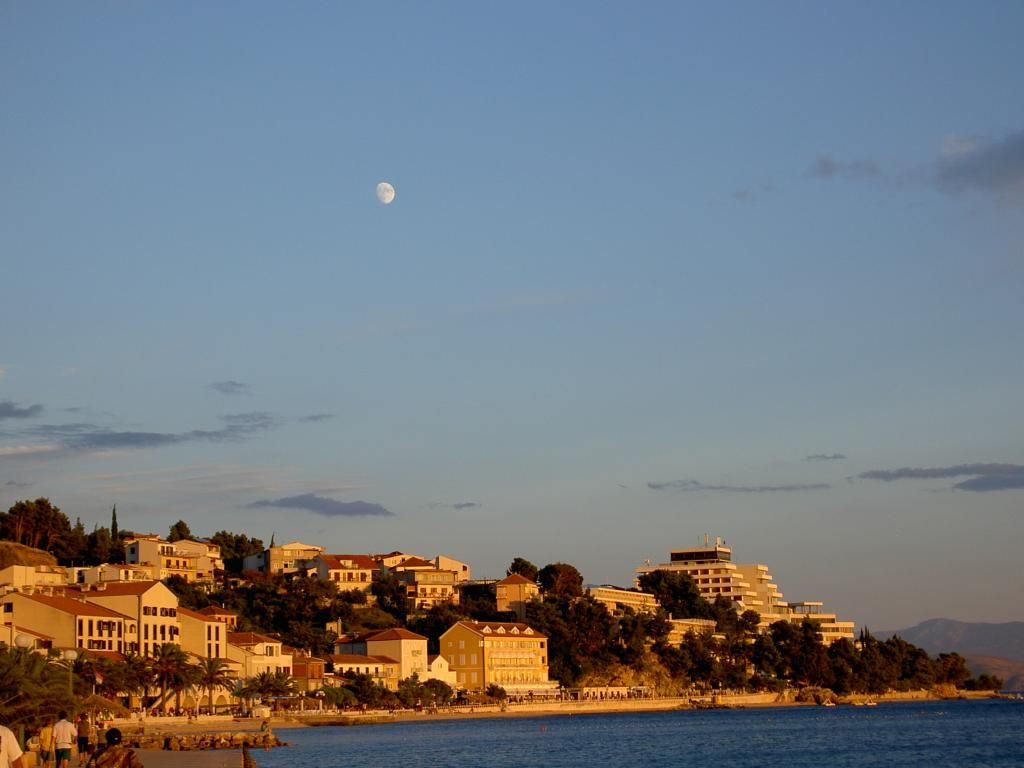
Podgora

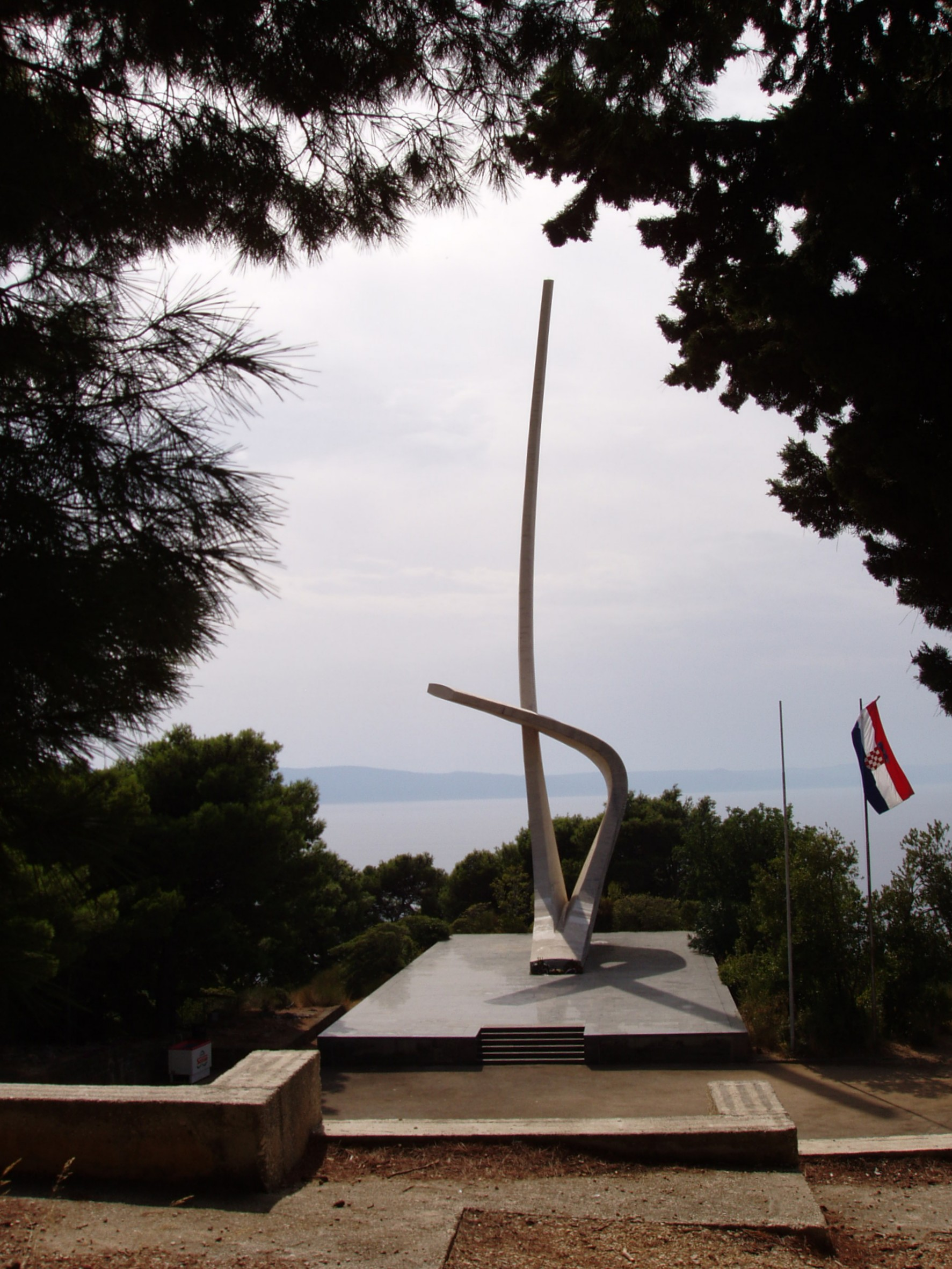

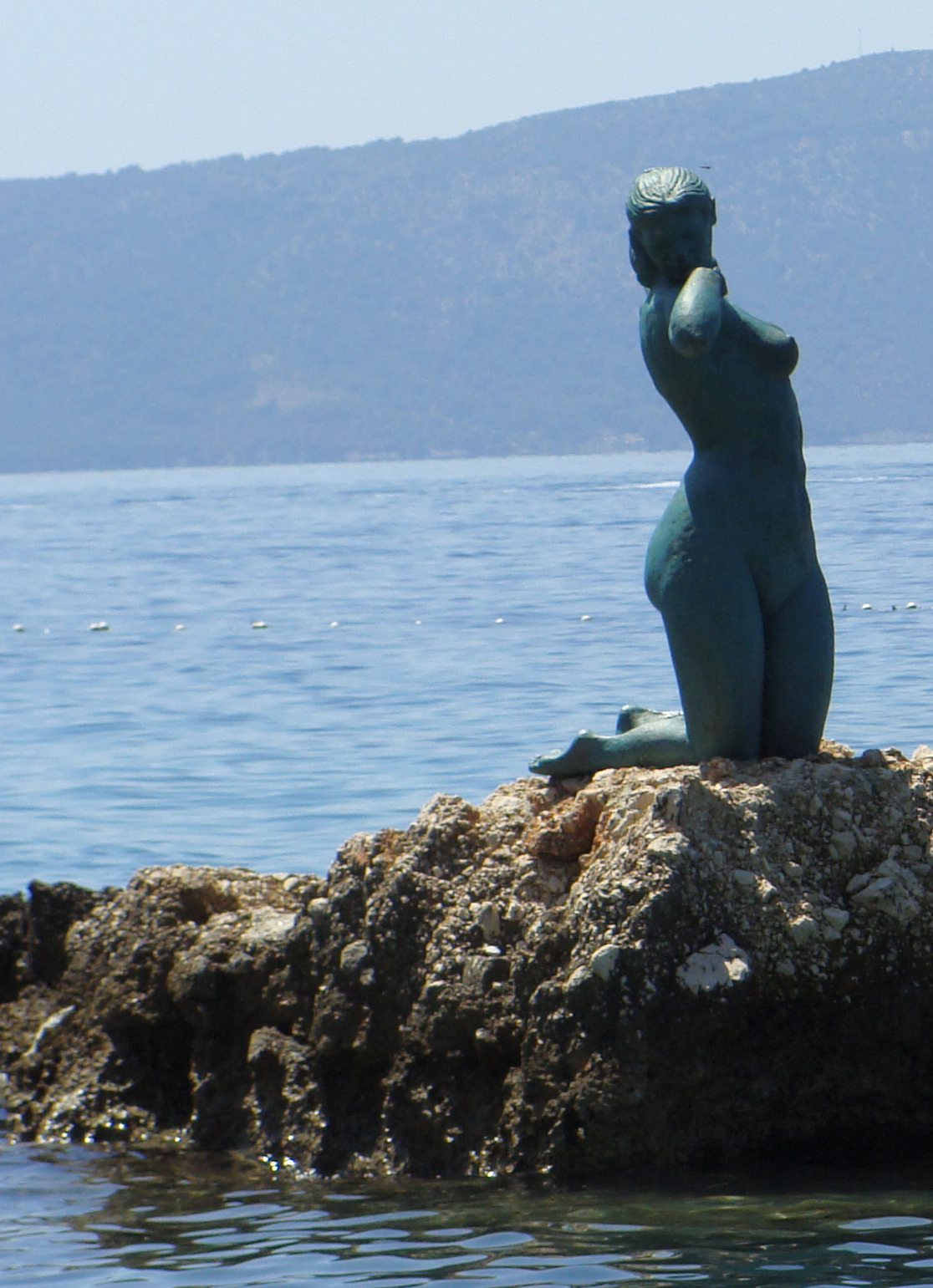

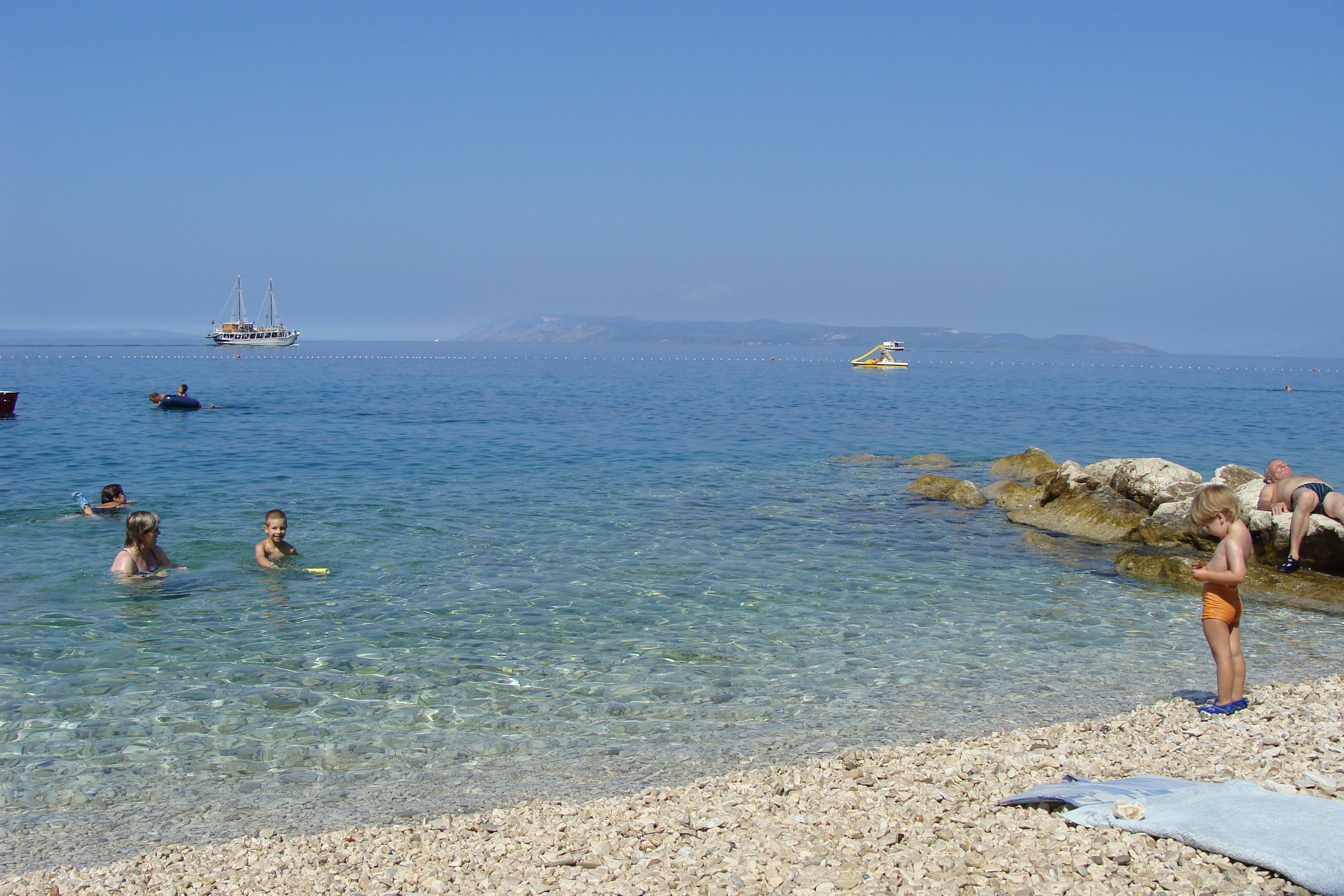

== Bibliography ==
- Bezić-Božanić, Nevenka (1992). "Doprinos poznavanju stanovništva Podgore u 19. stoljeću" [Supplement to the study of Podgora inhabitants in the 19th century] (PDF). Čakavska rič (in Croatian). XX (2): 51–61.
