= Zotti =

Zotti is a surname. Notable people with the surname include:

- Zotti (footballer), nickname of Jenner Zottele (born 1985), Brazilian footballer
- Amedeo Zotti, Italian tug of war competitor
- Carlo Zotti (born 1982), Italian footballer
- Ed Zotti (born 1951), American journalist
- Frank Zotti (1872–1947), American businessman
- Keith Zotti, Australian Paralympic lawn bowls player

== See also ==
- Florent Couao-Zotti (born 1964), Beninese writer
