= 1870 Dalmatian parliamentary election =

Parliamentary elections were held in the Kingdom of Dalmatia in 1870.

== Results ==
Party	Seats	+/–
People's Party	26	+11
Autonomist Party	16	–10
Total	42	+1

=== Elected representatives ===
==== People's Party ====
- Rafo Pucić
- Ante Radman

==== Autonomists ====
- Vincenzo Alesani
- Antonio Bajamonti
- Cosimo de Begna Possedaria (1870–1873)
- Natale Filippi (1870–1873)
- Gaetano Frari
- Matteo Gligo
- Stefano Knezevich
- Andrea Krussevich (1872–1873 and 1875–1876)
- Francesco Lanza (1870–1874)
- Luigi Lapenna (1872–1873)
- Pietro Doimo Maupas
- Luigi Mery
- Francesco Milcovich (1874–1876)
- Giuseppe Mladineo (1871–1874)
- Luigi Nutrizio (1875–1876)
- Giuseppe Piperata (1871–1873)
- Valerio Ponte (1870–1870)
- Giuseppe Radman (1874–1876)
- Simeone Rossignoli (1874–1876)
- Niccolò Trigari (1874–1876)
- Vincenzo Vuletich (1871–1876)
