= Julije Bajamonti =

- Born: 4 August 1744; Split, Venetian Republic (modern-day Croatia)
- Died: 12 November 1800 (aged 56) Split, Habsburg monarchy (modern-day Croatia)
- Genre: Opera
- Occupations: medical historian, writer, translator, encyclopedist, historian, philosopher, musician

Julije (Julio) Bajamonti (Italian: Giulio Bajamonti; 4 August 1744 – 12 November 1800) was a medical historian, writer, translator, encyclopedist, historian, philosopher and musician from the city of Split in present-day Croatia. His wife was Ljuba Bajamonti, a Split commoner.

Bajamonti is known for composing the first preserved oratorio in Croatia (La traslazione di San Doimo), writing about the history of Split (unfinished and unpublished), and helping Alberto Fortis, with his journey around Dalmatia which also included the discovery of the now famous South Slavic Muslim song, Hasanaginica.

After the fall of Venice in 1797 he urged that Dalmatia should be annexed to the Habsburg monarchy. In his speech in 1797 he stated that Austria was the successor of the old Venetian state. Like many other intellectuals along the Dalmatian coast Bajamonti wrote most of his works in Italian. Niccolò Tommaseo claims that there was no one in Italy who wrote better than Bajamonti during his time.

He performed his medical work in the cities of Split, Hvar, and Kotor (in the area of Boka Kotorska in today's Montenegro).

== Works ==
- Bajamonti, Giulio (1786). Storia della peste que regnò in Dalmazia negli anni 1783-1784 (in Italian). Venezia: Vincenzio Formaleoni.

== See also ==
- Antonio Bajamonti
- House of Bajamonti

== Bibliography ==
- Milčetić, Ivan (1912). "Dr. Julije Bajamonti i ńegova djela" [Dr. Julije Bajamonti and His Works]. Rad Jugoslavenske akademije znanosti i umjetnosti: Filologičko-historički i filosofičko-juridički razredi (in Serbo-Croatian). 54. JAZU: 97–250.
