= Serb People's Party (Dalmatia) =

Political party in the Kingdom of Dalmatia

Serb People's Party (Serbian: Српска народна странка / Srpska narodna stranka; better known as Serb People's Party in Primorje, Serbian: Српска народна странка у Приморју / Srpska narodna stranka u Primorju, lit. 'Serb People's Party in the Littoral' or Serb People's Party on Primorje, Serbian: Српска народна странка на Приморју / Srpska narodna stranka na Primorju, lit. 'Serb People's Party on the Littoral') was political party in the Kingdom of Dalmatia during the time of Austria-Hungary.

Significant early members of the Serb Party were Stjepan Mitrov Ljubiša (d. 1878), Nikodim Milaš, Ljubomir Vujnović, Uroš Desnica, Vladimir Simić. In political efforts, Ljubiša he fought against the ethnic Italian domination in Dalmatian politics and culture, for the equality of religions and languages, for the emancipation of Serb populace in Dalmatia, the economic benefit of the province but also for the autonomy of Dalmatia and against the unification with Croatia-Slavonia. Ljubiša had been the President of the Dalmatian parliament between 1870 and 1878 when he was overthrown by the clerical Croat fraction in the People's Party led by Mihovil Pavlinović.

Following the 1876 Dalmatian parliamentary election, the People's Party was in power. In 1878, led by Sava Bjelanović, the Serb members of the party left and founded the Serb Party. The Serb Party retained the leading position in the provinces of upper Dalmatia (Dalmatian hinterland): Kninska Krajina, Bukovica, Ravni Kotari, as well as the Bay of Kotor (which is today in Montenegro). The party's liberal left-wing branch was led by Bjelanović, while conservative right-wing branch by Milaš. They often were in conflict. Another significant member was Lazar Tomanović.

All six members of the Diet, but without Milaš who was parliamentary representative (still allowed to participate), were present during the so-called Zadar Resolution in 1905, which was one of the steps that led to the Croat-Serb Coalition.

== Diet of Dalmatia elections ==
- 1883: 8/41
- 1889: 9/41
- 1895: 9/41
- 1901: 6/41
- 1908: 7/41

== See also ==
- Serb People's Independent Party, in Croatia-Slavonia (1881-1918)
  - .Croat-Serb Coalition, alliance in Austro-Hungary (1905-1918)
- Serb People's Radical Party, in Croatia-Slavonia (until 1905)
