= Stjepan Spevec =

Croatian university professor and rector

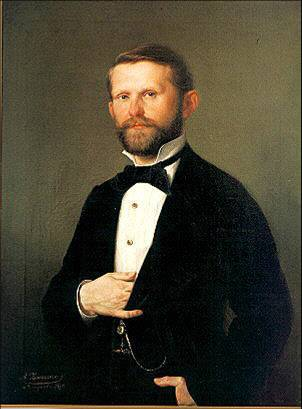
Stjepan Spevec, 1876 painting by Antonio Zuccaro

Stjepan Spevec (June 14, 1839 - January 28, 1905) was a Croatian university professor and rector.

Spevec was born in Vukanci near Mače. He graduated law at the Law Academy in Zagreb. Since Academy didn't have the right to give Ph.Ds, he received his Ph.D. in Vienna in 1868. The same year he started to work in Zagreb court, and teach administrative and canon law at the Law Academy. Soon after, he was appointed as an associate, and afterward as a full professor of Roman, state and international law. He became a university professor in 1874 after the foundation of University of Zagreb, and soon after a rector in the academic year 1875/1876. After his rectorship mandate expired, he served as a prorector. In the period of 1875-91 he was a member of the Croatian parliament. In 1886, he was appointed as a head of the Department for Theology and Education of the Royal Earth Government. He wrote the new school law. In 1891 he was selected as a president of the Chair of the Seven, a position which he held until his death. The king Franz Joseph I. named him his secret adviser in 1895. He died in Zagreb.

Academic offices
Preceded by Matija Mesić	Rector of the University of Zagreb; 1875 – 1876	Succeeded by Anton Kržan
