= Anton Kržan =

Croatian philosopher, university professor and rector

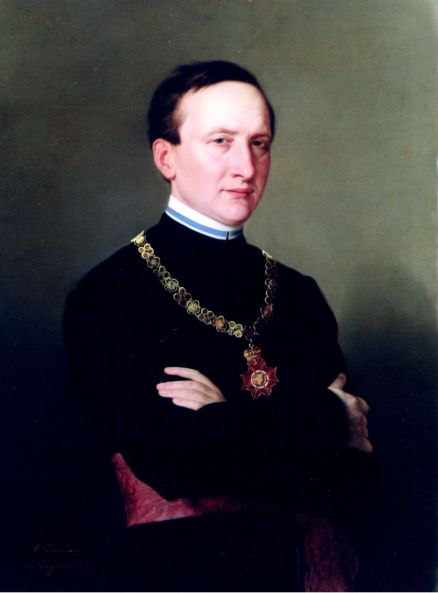
Anton Kržan, an 1877 painting by Antonio Zuccaro

Anton Kržan (June 8, 1835 – November 6, 1888) was a Croatian philosopher, university professor and a rector.

Born in Marija Gorica, he received his Ph.D. in philosophy in 1859 in Rome. He was ordained in 1862, and a year later receiving a Ph.D. in theology in Rome. After the return to Zagreb, he worked as a professor at the Archiepiscopal Seminary where he taught metaphysics and special dogmatics. He served as a full professor at the Faculty of Theology since 1874.

Professor Kržan was the third rector magnificus of the University of Zagreb, in the academic year 1876/1877. Since that year, the choice of rector is per turnum (every year the rector is chosen from another faculty).

Kržan wrote papers on the creation and the development of the organic world, being an ardent opponent of Darwinism. That was also a topic of his inaugural rectorial speech on October 19, 1876, when he was 41 years of age. After the expiry of his 1-year mandate, he served as a prorector. He was appointed as a canon in 1879. In two mandates, he served as a dean of the Faculty of Theology.

He died in Zagreb.

Academic offices
Preceded by Stjepan Spevec	Rector of the University of Zagreb; 1876 – 1877	Succeeded by Konstantin Vojnović
