= Macchiedo =

Dalmatian Italian family

Macchiedo was a Dalmatian Italian family from Hvar (Latin: Pharia, Italian: Lesina). signori Girolamo Macchiedo and Giovanni Macchiedo were members of the Diet of Dalmatia, the regional assembly of the Kingdom of Dalmatia within the Austro-Hungarian Empire.
