= Šimun de Michieli-Vitturi =

19th-century Dalmatian politician

Simeone de Michieli-Vitturi

Mayor of Split
- In office 1853–1859
- Preceded by: Leonard Dudan
- Succeeded by: Antonio Bajamonti

Simeone de Michieli-Vitturi was a Dalmatian politician who served as the Mayor of Split, and a member of the 1867 Imperial Council.
