= Miho Klaić =

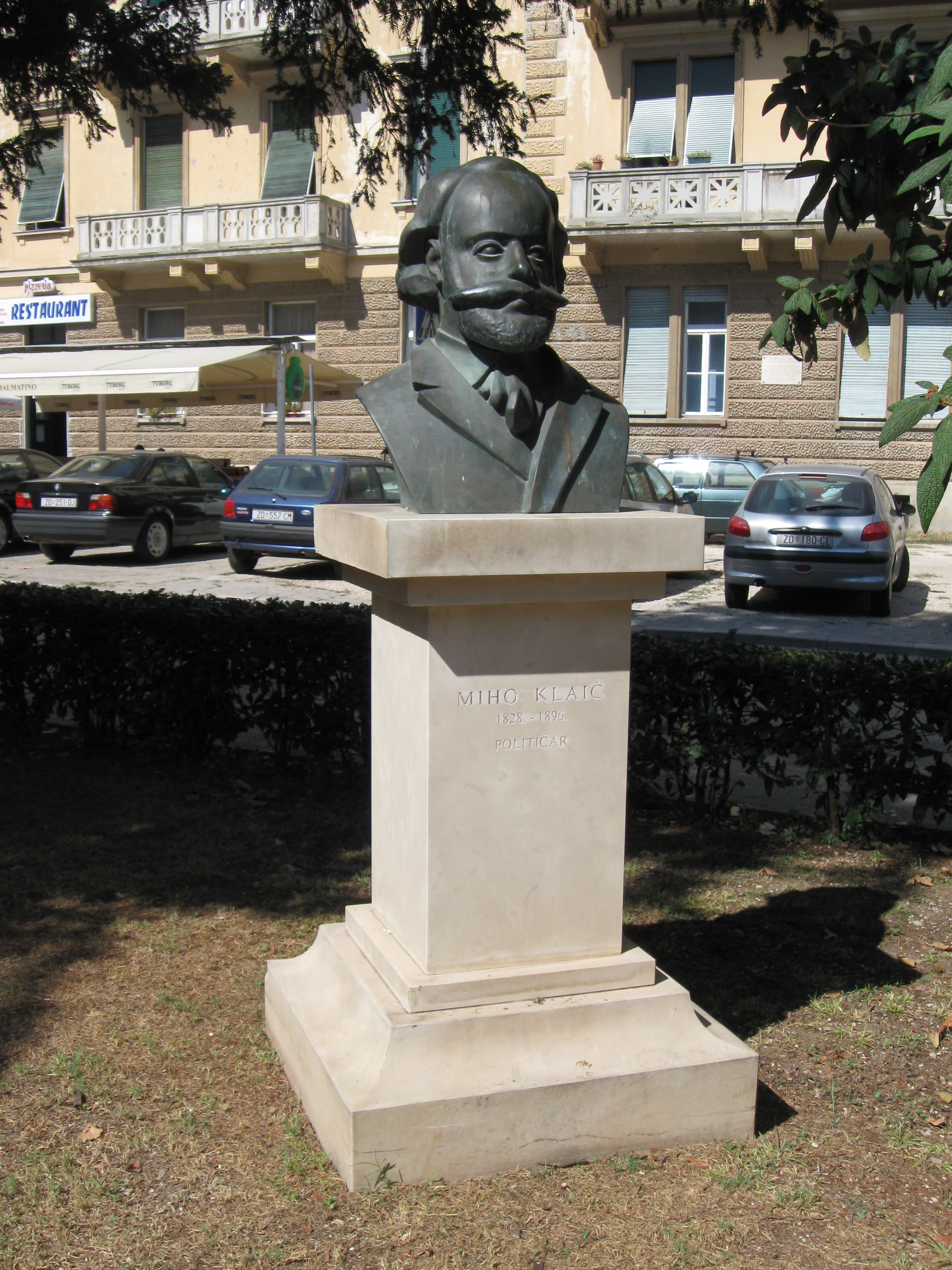
A bust of Miho Klaić in Zadar

Mihovil Klaić (August 19, 1829 – January 3, 1896) was a Croatian politician and a leader of the Croatian national revival in Dalmatia.

== Biography ==
Klaić was born in Dubrovnik. He obtained a PhD in architecture in Padua, Italy.

He was a member of the National Party and was elected as member of the Diet of Dalmatia in the National Committee. Miho Klaić was President of the Diet of Dalmatia and created the newspaper Il Nazionale.

Despite the persecution of the Austrian government, he fought all his life for the introduction of Croatian into education and demanded the administrative union of the Kingdom of Croatia-Slavonia with Dalmatia.

== 1873 election ==
Within the People's Party, Klaić quickly came into conflict with Mihovil Pavlinović, though Pavlinović eventually gave up on enforcing his views over the entire party and privately rejected the Interconfessional laws that the German liberals had passed in 1868, 1869 and 1874, which strengthened the powers of state over those of the church.

== 1875 election ==
In the majority Serbian district of Obrovac, which had voted for the Zemljaci in 1873, a feeling of betrayal prevailed after certain political decisions by the now-ruling People's Party, including a lack of fulfilment of certain promises made by Klaić. (Note: "Srbi Obrovački opaziše od godine 1873 na 1874 da se baš neizvršuje prema Srbima ono što je D.r Klaić obećao i poštenom rieči ujamčio") After a series of meetings held in the Krka monastery from October 1873 to February 1874 under the leadership of Vladimir Desnica, Vladimir Simić, Nikodim Milaš, Ljubomir Vujnović and Bogoljub Petranović. (Note: At the time, Petranović in the service of the Hamesništvo of the Kingdom of Serbia in Bosnia, though this relationship was discontinued following the Congress of Berlin.) It drew up a list of demands from Mihovil Klaić, seeking from him an affirmation of the equality of the Serbian ethnonym, language and script, the removal of "clericals" (Note: Catholic priests of Anti-Orthodox sentiment) from the party's mouthpiece, Narodni list and the introduction of Cyrillic into public schools as a sign of Pan-Slavic reciprocity. The demands did not represent an ultimatum, being under the influence of the more pragmatic Vladimir Simić. Similar demands had been made to Klaić in a private letter likely from Simić before the 1873 election, (Note: To which he promised among other things that Narodni list would not "publish anything insulting against the Serbs" (Serbo-Croatian: nedonese ništa uvrednoga protiv Srbâ).) and in response to the 1874 demands he replied publicly in Narodni list.

== 1877 election ==
On 29 January 1877, Stjepan Mitrov Ljubiša gave a speech before the Diet of Dalmatia in which openly opposed the unification of Dalmatia with Croatia-Slavonia. With the assent of Klaić, with whom Ljubiša had a personal feud, the decision was made in the People's Party to target Ljubiša. They had the verification commission annul Ljubiša's election on the grounds that one of his voters had not yet been of age. The People's Party, in the majority, accepted the proposal. In his final address, Ljubiša held a speech accusing the People's Party of religious and ethnic intolerance, declaring that the Serbian national movement would work independently in the future. Shortly thereafter, Nikodim Milaš published an article in Glas Crnogorca calling for the foundation of a separate Serbian party in Dalmatia with its own media outlet, because of the loss of confidence of the Serbs in the People's Party. The result was a lasting exchange of polemics between Narodni list representing the Croats with Pavlinović at their head and Glas Crnogorca and Zastava representing the Serbs with Milaš at their head.

== 1879 election loss ==
On the Bosnian question of the 1870s in the leadup to the Austro-Hungarian campaign of 1878, two opposite opinions on the fate of the Bosnian vilayet formed in the Diet of Dalmatia. Mihovil Pavlinović led the People's Party in arguing it ought to be annexed by Austria-Hungary, and then given to the Croatian element of the Triune Kingdom they desired. Klaić, still a People's Party candidate but increasingly intermediate between the Party norm and the Slavic wing of the Autonomist Party, preferred a Serbian annexation of Bosnia and eventually of the same territory the People's Party wanted for their Kingdom of Croatia, including Dalmatia.

After the Austrian occupation of Bosnia, however, Klaić accepted the change as a done deal. During the elections in July 1879, Klaić ran as a People's Party candidate for the electoral district Zadar-Pag-Benkovac-Obrovac. Zadar remained the last stronghold of the Autonomist Party, leaving the Serbian voters of Benkovac and Obrovac with the decisive vote. The election became especially contentious in Obrovac, where the Serbs refused to accept the program of the People's Party to unite all four, and now five, kingdoms, into a single "Croatian" kingdom, which Sava Bjelanović would later term the "Quintune" kingdom (Serbian: Petojednica), referring to Bosnia, Slavonia, Croatia, Fiume (or part of the Austrian Littoral) and Dalmatia. Some compromise-leaning Serbs proposed Manfred Borelli or Jovo Medović run instead of Klaić. Pavlinović proposed the municipal administrator (Serbo-Croatian: općinski načelnik) of Obrovac, Vladimir Simić, run. This would have been just to prevent the development of a Serb-Autonomist coalition, but such a coalition was already forming. The Autonomists decided to run Gustav Ivanić against Klaić, as Ivanić was a son-in-law of the Zadar Autonomist leader Nicolò Trigari. Ivanić signed a list of demands from the Serbs, including the rejection of uniting Dalmatia with Croatia-Slavonia and the recognition of the Serbs as an independent ethnicity. Even with Klaić, the People's Party was unwilling to match Ivanić's demands, and lost the election in December. It was the first loss of many to the new Italo-Serbian coalition, and this gained the Autonomists a majority in the Diet of Dalmatia. Many Croats of the People's Party then accused the Serbs of treachery.

Upon the foundation of the Serbian Party, Klaić took a relatively mild stance against it for a Croat politician, as he considered it likely to dissipate over time, without support from the government at any level. For this reason, he considered it prudent to simply ignore the party. Following this advice, the Narodni list paid only peripheral attention to the Serbian Party in 1880 and 1881, and generally within the scope of attacks on the Autonomists. Pavlinović ended this at the end of 1881 with a polemic directed against Sava Bjelanović, because Bjelanović had signed a letter of criticism of Pavlinović as a "Catholic Serb", to which Pavlinović responded with accusing Bjelanović of trying to convert Catholic Slavs to Serbdom.

Soon after, Srpski list was founded to represent the new Serbian party. It directed most of its criticism against Pavlinović, while deriding Klaić's liberal wing as Pavlinović's "subjects" (Serbian: podložnici). Sava Bjelanović led a liberal Serbian wing, often supported by Serbian Eastern Catholics, especially in Dubrovnik. Bjelanović's death in 1897 led to a schism within the Serbian Party between conservatives and liberal-radicals.

== Bibliography ==
=== General ===
- Opća i nacionalna enciklopedija, Zagreb, 2005-2007
- Macan, Trpimir (1980). Miho Klaić. Knjižnica studija i monografija o hrvatskoj kulturnoj baštini (in Serbo-Croatian). Zagreb: Nakladni zavod MH.

=== Politics ===
- Rajčić, Tihomir (2005-11-01). "Srpski nacionalni pokret u Dalmaciji u XIX. stoljeću" [The Serbian National Movement in Dalmatia in the XIXth Century]. Radovi Zavoda za povijesne znanosti HAZU u Zadru (in Serbo-Croatian) (47): 341–361. ISSN 1330-0474.
- Rajčić, Tihomir (2001-10-19). "Odnos Srpskog lista (glasa) prema autonomašima u Dalmaciji 80-ih godina XIX. stoljeća" [The Behaviour of the Serbian Party Towards the Dalmatian Autonomists in Austrian Dalmatia]. Radovi Zavoda za povijesne znanosti HAZU u Zadru (in Serbo-Croatian) (43): 375–388. ISSN 1330-0474.
- Macan, Trpimir (1979). "Suradnja i sukobi Mihovila Klaića i Stefana Mitrova Ljubiše". Historijski zbornik (31–32) (published 1980-01-10): 151–163. ISSN 0351-2193.
- "Na izjavu Bukovačkih Srba II". Narodni list. Vol. 18, no. 63. 1879-08-13. pp. 1–3.
