= Đevrske =

Đevrske Ђеврске (Serbian)
- Village
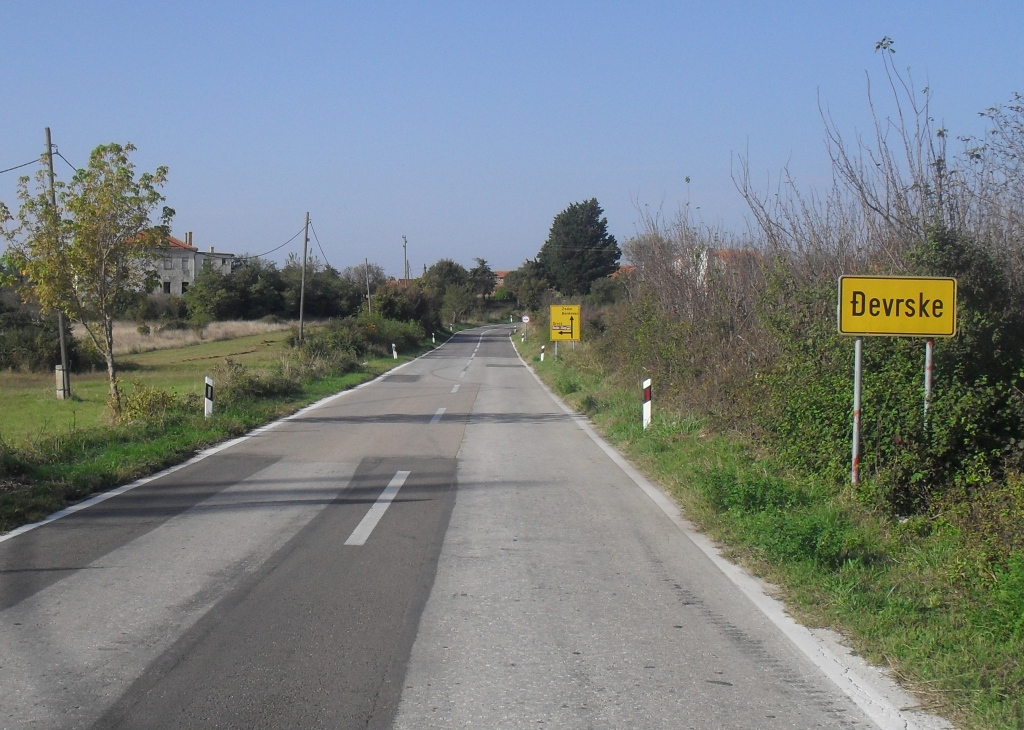
- Traffic sign at the village entrance
- Interactive map of Đevrske
- Location of Đevrske in Croatia
- Coordinates: 43°58′N 15°51′E
- Country: Croatia
- County: Šibenik-Knin County
- Municipality: Kistanje

Area
  - Total: 13.8 km^{2} (5.3 sq mi)
- Elevation: 230 m (750 ft)

Population (2021)
  - Total: 175
  - Density: 12.7/km^{2} (32.8/sq mi)
- Time zone: UTC+1 (CET)
  - Summer (DST): UTC+2 (CEST)
- Postal code: 22319 Đevrske

Đevrske (Serbian Cyrillic: Ђеврске) is a village located in Kistanje municipality, 10 km southwest of Kistanje, in the continental part of Šibenik-Knin County, Croatia.

Archaeological procedures began in 19th century. Medieval graveyards, containing graves adorned with jewellery and stirrups have been found which date from 9-11.th century along with several medieval tombstones.

== Demographics ==
In the census of 1991, for Đevrske there were 836 inhabitants of the following nationalities:

Census 1991.
| Serbs | 97.72 |
| Croats | 0.35 |
| Yugoslavs | 0.35 |
| Roma | 0.11 |
| Slovenes | 0.11 |
| Undeclared | 0.59 |
| Unknown | 0.71 |
Total: 836

== Notable people ==
- Sava Bjelanović
