= Lujo Bakotić =

Serbian writer, publicist, lawyer, lexicographer and diplomat (1867–1941)

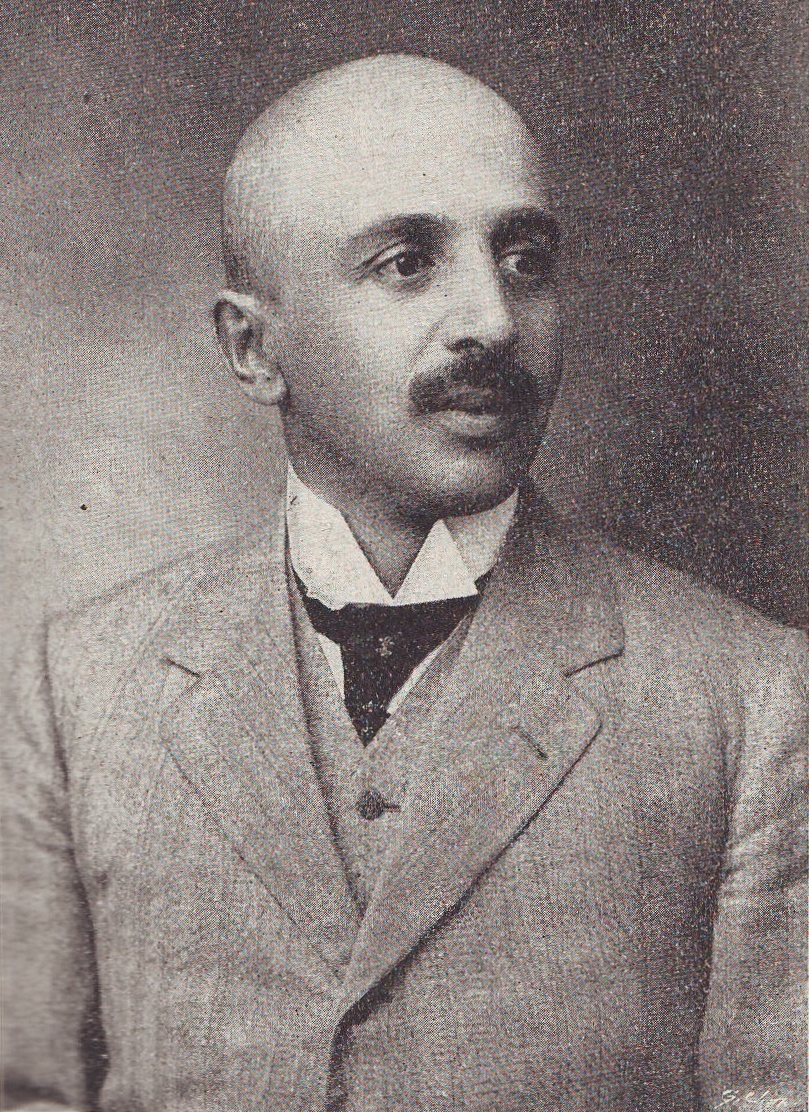
- A photograph of Lujo Bakotić
- Born: 21 November 1867; Senj, Austria-Hungary
- Died: 31 March 1941 (aged 73); Belgrade, Kingdom of Yugoslavia
- Occupations: writer, publicist, lawyer, lexicographer and diplomat.
- Writing career
- Language: Serbian

Lujo Bakotić (21 November 1867 – 31 March 1941) was a Serbian writer, publicist, lawyer, lexicographer and diplomat.

== Biography ==
Bakotić was born in Senj to Ignjat Bakotić and Adela Gravisi. He was baptized Alojzije ("Lujo") Juraj Franjo Ivan Josip Bakotić. Though he was Roman Catholic, Bakotić considered himself Serbian, as had his father. He completed his high school (gymnasium) education in Split, and jurisprudence in Vienna and Graz. He was a lawyer by profession who was also politically active, representing the Serbian Party in the Diet of Dalmatia. Owing to his party's ideals he had to flee to Serbia in 1913. With the start of the Great War, he left Belgrade for Niš and then went to Paris and finally Rome, where he was made a secretary in the Vatican to work on a mission, preparing a Concordat between Serbia and the Vatican (which never materialized).

After the war, he was Yugoslavia's envoy at the Vatican from 1920 until 1923. He represented the Kingdom of Yugoslavia at The Hague, and later he was sent by the Serbian government to Moscow. He retired as a civil servant in 1935. He died in Belgrade.

Classically educated, Bakotić spoke several languages fluently, including: French, Italian, German, English, Latin and a number of Slavic languages and dialects.

== Selected works ==
- Justinijanove institucije/ Justinian's Institution (translated from Latin, 1911).
- Dalmatinsko pitanje/ The Dalmatian Question (published in Switzerland in French, 1915)
- Rečnik srpskohrvatskog jezika/ Serbo-Croatian Dictionary (1936)
- Translated the Bible (Stari i Novi Zavet/ New and Old Testament, 1938)
- Srbi u Dalmaciji/ Serbs in Dalmatia (1939).
