= Vincenzo Duplancich =

Italian journalist, writer and politician (1818–1888)

- Born: 15 August 1818; Zara, Austrian Empire (today Zadar, Croatia)
- Died: 16 September 1888 (aged 70); Milan, Kingdom of Italy

Vincenzo Duplancich (Croatian: Vicko Duplančić; 15 August 1818 – 16 September 1888) was a Dalmatian Italian journalist, writer, politician, and nationalist. He promoted Italian culture and the preservation of Italian identity in Dalmatia, firmly opposing the annexation of the latter to Croatia. He was active during and within the Risorgimento.

== Biography ==
He was born in Zadar (at the time Austria-Hungary, today Zadar, Croatia), the son of Antonio and of Antonia Amadeo Fabri. He was born into a well-to-do family. After attending, and completing, high school in his hometown, he renounced to pursue his studies at the university.

He studied literature, history, economy as an autodidact. In 1845, he refused to work for the journal La Dalmazia of abbot Fransceschini.

Duplancich was elected librarian of Zadar's new public library, formed from the bequest of Pier Alessandro Paravia, and went on to transform it in one of the most important libraries of Dalmatia.

He was one of the first to join the guardia nazionale in Zadar, and was praised for his service during the short duration thereof.

Duplancich remarked on the distinction present in Dalmatia between the Italian man living in the cities and the Slav (Croatian) living in the hinterlands and the fields, emphasizing the cultural superiority of the Latin and Italian civilization in respect of that of the Slav. Duplancich identified Dalmatian culture with Italian culture, and "separated and distinguished Slavism from the Italian spirit." His views were shared only by a few Italian Dalmatians and a small number of supporters of the liberal autonomist movement.

However, he is also credited with publishing journals that promoted the preservation of the woods and the study of the Slavic language, promoting collaboration between Italians and Slavs in his native Dalmatia, and defending the Slavs and the culture of the Slavs, of whom he praised the intelligence. He was an autonomist for Dalmatia, and while he opposed the union of Dalmatia to any Croatian or Slavic-speaking country, he also worked to the reconciliation of Slavs and Italians, or the peaceful coexistence of the two. Duplancich put at the center of his project the Italian and Italian-speaking elite. He collaborated to the creation of the weekly La voce dalmatica, promoting collaboration between Italians and Croatians, which was criticized notably by Niccolò Tommaseo. (Note: Tommaseo stated: "(mi) sarebbe piaciuto che le cose buone da' Croati tentate o desiderate nella Voce dalmatica avessero lode schietta, acciocché quindi divengano più autorevoli le osservazioni da farsi sopra le loro miserie e i difetti, sopra le consuetudini mezzo barbariche, e le istituzioni viete e impotenti." English: "I would've liked that the good things of the Croatians, attempted to be portrayed or wished for to exist by the Voce Dalmatica, had been praised more directly, so that the observations on their miseries and defects, on their semi-barbaric customs and their impotent institutions had also been emphasized the more.")

He was one of the founders of the paper La voce dalmatica in 1860, which soon became associated with the Autonomist Party. In 1861, he was elected a deputy in the Diet of Dalmatia. Because of some of his writing in the La voce dalmatica, in 1863 he was charged with treason, so he moved to Milan.

== Sources ==
- Fonti e Bibl.: Necr. di V. Brunelli, in Il Dalmata (Zara), nn. 96, 97, 100, 103 (1-29dic. 1888);
- P. Kasandrich, Il giornalismo dalmato, Zara 1899, pp. 54 s.;
- Lettere ined. di N. Tommaseo dirette al pittore zaratino D. Salghetti Drioli, in Arch. stor. per la Dalmazia, I (1927), 4, pp. 79 s;
- II (1928), 3, pp. 159–168; G. Praga-A. Zink, Documenti del 1848-49 a Zara e in Dalmazia, in LaVenezia Giulia e la Dalmazia nella Rivol. naz. del 1848–1849, Udine 1848, II, p. 268;
- A. de Benvenuti, Storia di Zara dal 1797 al 1918, Milano 1953, pp. 113, 116; C. Camizzi, Il dibattito sull'annessione della Dalmazia alla Croazia, in Riv. dalmatica, XLIV (1973), pp. 125–159, 225–272;
- Id., V.D., in L'Esule (Milano), 15 ott. 1980, pp. 4–5;
- G. Paoli Palcich, V. D., lettere e documenti, tra autonomia eirredentismo, in Rivista dalmatica, LVII (1986), pp. 169–236; T. Chiarioni, 1861: i diversi contributi alla difesa dell'autonomia dalmata (seguito da V. Duplancich, Della civiltà ital. e slava in Dalmazia), ibid., LVIII (1987), pp. 14–50;
- L'avventurosa fuga di V. D., a cura di V. Brunelli, ibid., pp. 97–102.
