= Luka Marjanović =

Croatian lawyer and ethnographer

Luka Marjanović (18 October 1844 – 8 September 1920) was a Croatian lawyer and ethnographer.

He was born in Zavalje. After receiving a degree in law at the University of Zagreb, he received his PhD in Vienna in 1872. During the period 1872–1874 he taught as a professor of Austrian civil law at the Law Academy in Zagreb, and then canon law at the Faculty of Law until 1903. He collected and published Hrvatske narodne pjesme, što se pjevaju u gornjoj hrvatskoj Krajini i u turskoj Hrvatskoj ("Croatian folk songs, sung in Upper Krajina and Turkish Croatia", 1864). At the initiative of Matica hrvatska he collected epic folk songs sung by Muslim (Bosniak) singers (published as Hrvatske narodne pjesme, III–IV, 1898–99).

He died in Zagreb.

Academic offices
Preceded by Antun Franki	Rector of the University of Zagreb; 1889–1890	Succeeded by Natko Nodilo
