= Matija Mesić =

Croatian historian, university professor and rector

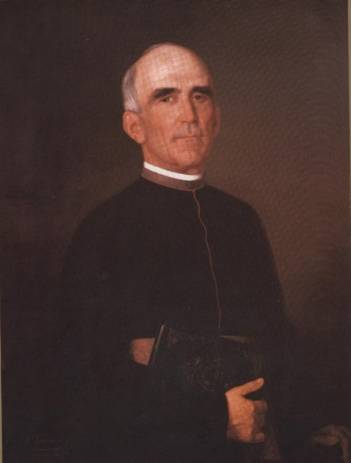
Matija Mesić, 1894 painting by Oton Iveković

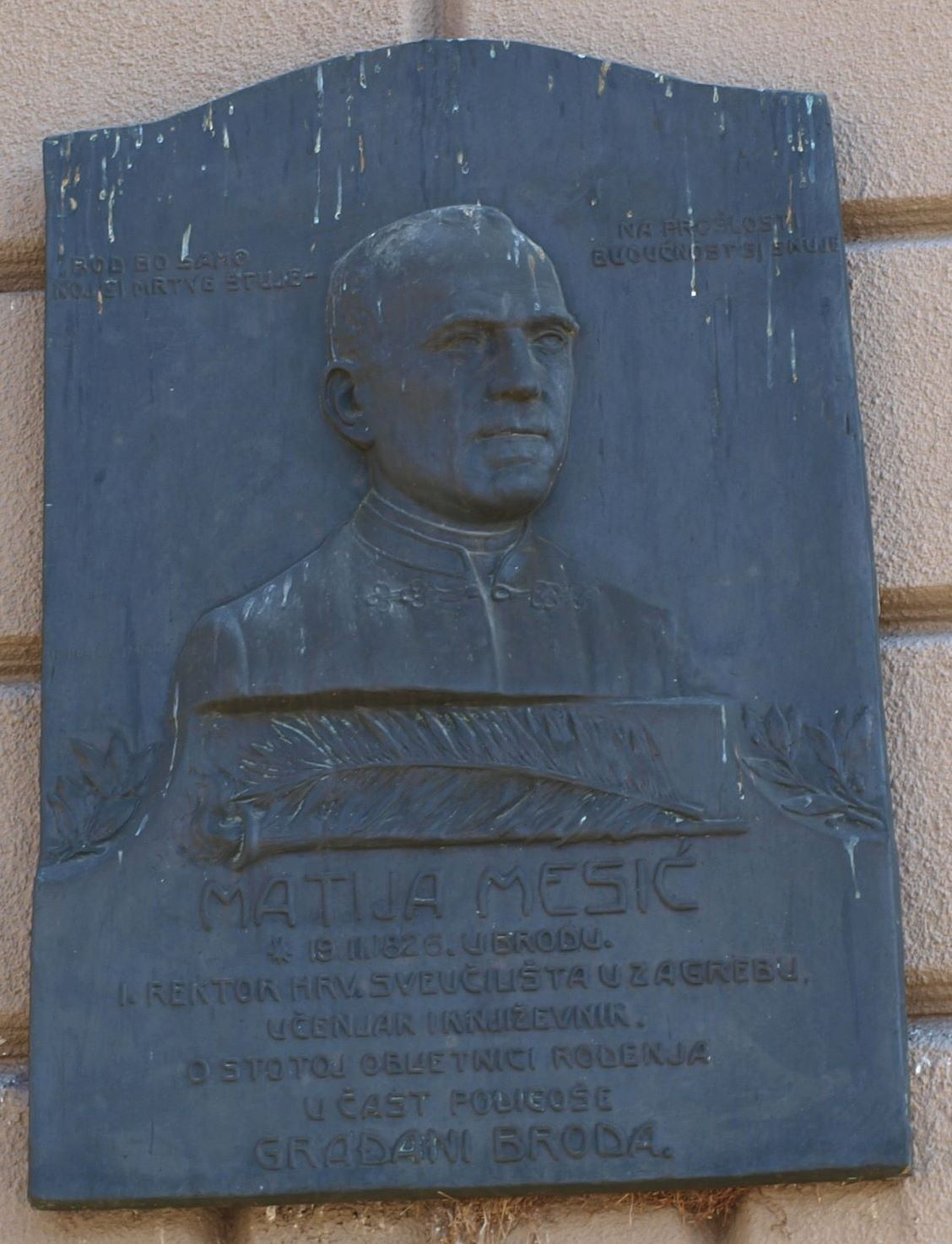
Memorial board to Matija Mesić at the Faculty of Engineering in Slavonski Brod

Matija Mesić (Brod na Savi, February 19, 1826 – Zagreb, December 5, 1878) was a Croatian historian, university professor, and the first rector of the University of Zagreb.

He graduated philosophy at the Royal Academy of Science in 1844, and theology at the Vienna Pázmáneum in 1848. After being ordained and a short chapel service, he worked as a probationary professor of history and geography at the gymnasium in Zagreb. In the period 1851–1853 he studied history and geography in Vienna and Prague. He received a professorship at the Law Academy in Zagreb in 1854, working as a director of the same institution since 1871.

He participated in the work of Croatian parliament and served as the president of Matica ilirska. He was a full member of the Yugoslav Academy of Sciences and Arts since 1867. In 1874 he was selected as a full professor of Croatian history at the Faculty of Philosophy.

In the academic year 1874/75 he had the honor to be the first rector of the Royal University of Franz Joseph I in Zagreb. In the opening ceremony, on the October 19, 1874, he held his famous speech in which he warned on the importance of modern university.

In his works he systematically and critically dealt with the period of Croatian history of late Middle Ages in the period of Jagiellon dynasty. A street on Šalata in Zagreb bears his name since 1928.

Cultural offices
Preceded by Ivan Mažuranić	President of Matica hrvatska 1872 – 1874	Succeeded by Ivan Kukuljević Sakcinski
Academic offices
Preceded by Office created	Rector of the University of Zagreb; 1874 – 1875	Succeeded by Stjepan Spevec
