= Angelo Antonio Frari =

Dalmatian physician

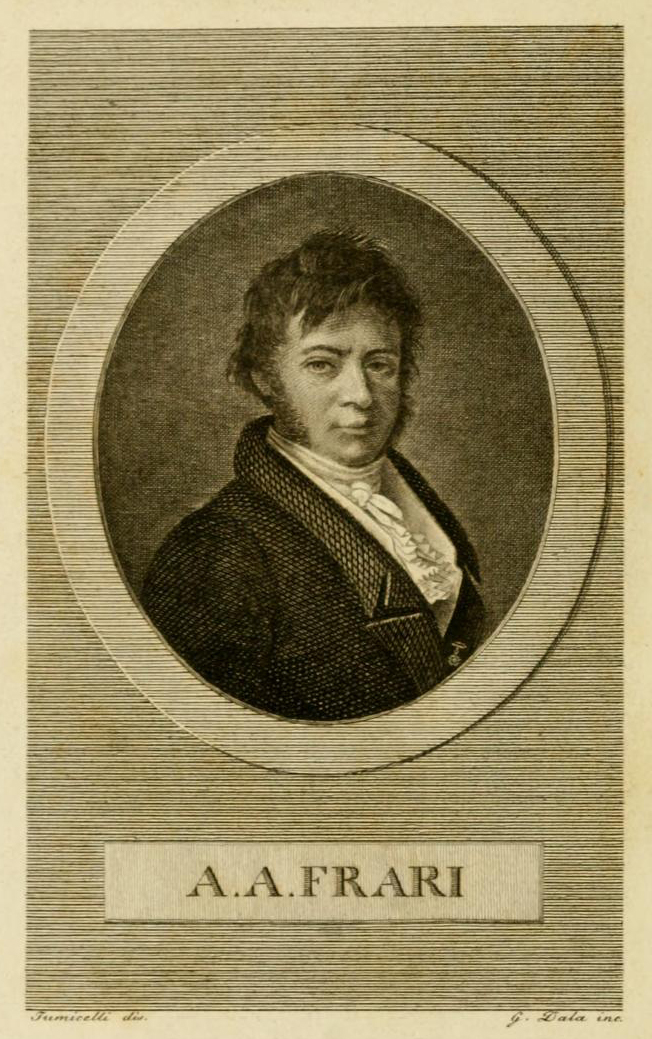
Angelo Antonio Frari (1780–1865)

Angelo Antonio Frari (Croat. Anđeo Antun) (1780 – 1865) was a Dalmatian medical doctor, who served as the municipal physician and the head of the lazaretto of Split, province of Spalato (1806–1821), the protomedicus, and the president of the Maritime Health Magistrate of Venice (1835–1843), famous epidemiologist and historian of medicine.

== Origins ==
Angelo Frari came from an illustrious medical family from Venetian Dalmatia's Sebenico (today Šibenik, Croatia). His father Giuseppe Frari came from Treviso to Sebenico, where he became the chief municipal physician and the author of the first work on rabies written in Dalmatia, published in 1782 in Ancona: Riflessioni teorico-mediche sopra una grave malattia, l'istoria della quale farà vedere li sintomi che precedettero (...) (Ancona, Presso Pietro Ferri 1783). His brother Sebastiano was also the chief municipal physician of Sebenico, as well as his nephew Luigi Frari, who was also the mayor of Šibenik. His son Michele Carlo Frari was an illustrious professor of obstetrics at the University of Padua.

== Medical education ==
Frari graduated in medicine from the University of Padua in 1801 and acquired further medical education in Vienna as a student of the famous public health ideologist and founder of hygiene as a science, Dr Johann Peter Frank.

== Work in Dalmatia ==
As a prominent epidemiologist, Frari became the municipal physician in Spalato (today Split, Croatia) and headed the lazaretto of Spalato in the period of Napoleon's government (1806–1813), and later, until 1821. He was famous for his efforts and success in the improvement of the Dalmatian quarantine system and municipal hygiene. Frari, astonished with the poor sanitary conditions and poverty in Dalmatia, undertook numerous actions in order to improve the sanitary conditions. He warned Napoleon's governor Vincenzo Dandolo about the tragic health and social situation in Split and its surroundings. He also incited the launching the new Law on Health Issues, which was officially accepted in 1812, together with the Instructiones sur les Lazarets, which were mostly composed by Frari. During this period of his life, Frari was also very effective in the suppression of plague epidemics in Spalato, Makarska, and in some regions of Montenegro and Albania. In 1815, he himself became ill, but cured himself by cutting the bubonic masses and treating them with oil and sweat.

== Work in Venice ==
Frari, as a supporter of French revolutionary ideas, had to leave Spalato in 1821 and stayed in Zadar/Zara for a short period. In 1822, he left Dalmatia for good and moved to Verona and three years later to Venice, where he was active as an epidemiologist and writer. He served as the protomedicus of Venice and the president of the Maritime Health Magistrate of Venice from 1830 until 1843. In 1835 he went to Egypt, as a consultant in the suppression of plague.

== Letters from Verona and Venice ==
Although Frari never came back to Dalmatia, he maintained an emotional connection to the region he came from: in numerous letters exchanged with his friend Vicko Capogrosso-Cavagnin, he expressed his nostalgia for Dalmatia. These letters were chiefly written in Venetian, but some sentences and thoughts were also written in Croatian, such as "pomosi, brate, ali sad ali nikad" ('help me, my brother, now or never'), or "nimam pinesi" ('I lack money'). From this, it is obvious that Frari faced some financial difficulties, in particular during his stay in Verona. In these letters it is recorded that he even tried to improve his living conditions by selling wines from the region of Šibenik/Sebenico and the island of Zlarin in Verona.

== Publications ==
Frari published a number of medical papers. In Padua, in 1817 (2nd edition in Spalato 1820), he published a description of typhus fever in Spalato and the surrounding area (the towns of Trogir/Trau and Kaštela/Castelli, and the island of Brač/Brazza), called Storia della febbre epidemica che regnò a Spalato e luoghi vicini nell'anno 1817 named the illness typhus because it, apparently, resembled the yellow fever (typhus icteroides) in its symptoms and changes found in autopsies.

His later work Cenni storici sull'isola di Poveglia e sulla sua importanza sotto l'aspetto sanitario (Venice 1837) provided arguments in favor of the quarantine protection system, in particular the one used on the island of Poveglia at the entrance to Venice. Frari found the quarantine protection system extremely important, which brought him into conflict with the protomedicus of the Austrian Littoral, Franz Weber, who proposed restrictions on the quarantine system in order to stimulate Mediterranean steamship traffic. The issue of the quarantine system finally led to Frari's involuntary retirement in 1843, since he was accused of corruption related to public health and the quarantine system.

Frari's primary work was Della peste e della publica amministrazione sanitaria (Venice 1840), considered the world's best general history of the plague epidemics up to that time. In almost 1000 pages, he described plague epidemics around the world and, in particular, Dalmatia in great detail. In this overall review, he discussed various diagnostic possibilities, methods of treatment, and reported on autopsy results, and methods of disinfection, describing the methods such as fumigation. Frari was convinced that the cause of the disease was a specific contagious germ (germe del contagio), though the bacillus of plague (Yersinia pestis) was discovered as late as 1894.

== Reflections on Frari's work ==
Frari's scientific work and medical practice was especially praised by his close friend Niccolò Tommaseo (Croatian: Nikola Tommaseo), the famous Šibenik-born Italian and Croatian writer, novelist, and revolutionary politician, in his Intimate Diary and poems dedicated to doctor Frari. Tommaseo, on Frari's proposal, even wrote a letter of protest to the Austrian Emperor regarding poverty and poor sanitary conditions in Dalmatia.

Frari was awarded the Gold medal of civilian merit honor for services rendered in plague circumstances (medaglia d'oro di onore del merito civile per servizi prestati in circostanze di peste) by the Emperor Franz Joseph I of Austria for his epidemiologic work in Dalmatia.

== Literature ==
- Krnić A. "Giuseppe and Aloysius Frari's Works on Rabies and History of Frari Medical Family of Šibenik, Dalmatia". Croat Med J. 2007 June; 48(3): 378–390.
