= Luigi Frari =

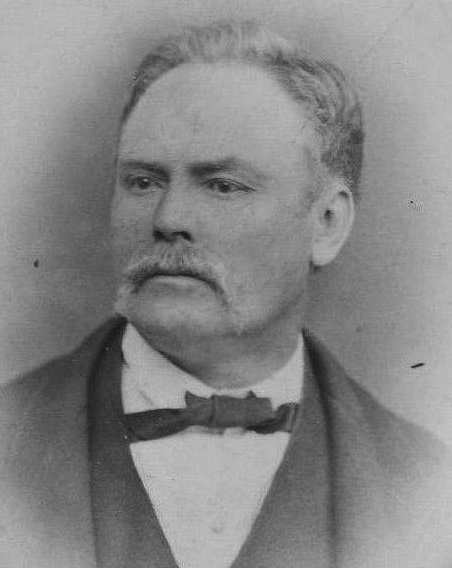

Luigi Frari (Lat. Aloysius, Croat. Lujo) (1813–1898) was a Dalmatian medical doctor and politician from Šibenik, Dalmatia, now Croatia, who served as the chief municipal physician of Šibenik, and also as the mayor and political and social activist of Šibenik, Dalmatia. His special political and social efforts were related to improving the infrastructure and modernizing the city of Šibenik, as well as speaking in favor of preservation of Roman Catholic Diocese of Šibenik in 1872. He also contributed to the collection and preservation of folk proverbs in the Šibenik region. His inaugural dissertation on rabies from 1840 represents an example of conceptions of the disease in the early 19th century, before Louis Pasteur's time.

== Origins ==
Luigi ("Aloysius") Frari came from an illustrious Šibenik medical family. His grandfather Giuseppe Frari came from Treviso, Republic of Venice (now Veneto), to Šibenik, Dalmatia (now Croatia), where he became the chief municipal physician and the author of a work on rabies published in 1782 in Ancona: Riflessioni teorico-mediche sopra una grave malattia, l'istoria della quale farà vedere li sintomi che precedettero (...) (Ancona, Presso Pietro Ferri 1783). It is considered the first publication on rabies written in the territory of modern Croatia. His father Sebastiano was also the chief municipal physician of Šibenik. His uncle Angelo Antonio Frari was chief municipal physician of Split, famous epidemiologist, historian of medicine and the protomedicus of Venice, whose son Michele Carlo Frari was an illustrious professor of obstetrics at the University of Padua.

== Dissertation on rabies ==
In 1840 in Vienna, Frari published his inaugural dissertation at the Padua University on rabies, De rabie canina. It was the second inaugural dissertation on subject of rabies written by an author from the region of modern Croatia, and it contained an overall description of the disease, methods of transmission, symptoms, clinical course, and methods of curing and treating the disease and preventing its transmission. The dissertation was doubtlessly greatly inspired by his grandfather Giuseppe Frari's pioneering work on rabies from 1782.

== Political and social work in Šibenik ==
However, perhaps more than for his medical work, Frari was famous for his political and social activism and writing. He was the mayor of Šibenik and is especially remembered for his work in improving the town's infrastructure. As mayor (il Podestà), Frari also fought against a possible abolition of the Roman Catholic Diocese of Šibenik in 1872. In an article published in La Dalmazia Cattolica addressed directly to the Austrian Emperor, Frari provided substantial religious and civil arguments for preserving the diocese. Frari was also the president of the Šibenik Theatre Society, which financed and built the Šibenik Mazzoleni Theatre in 1870, one of the oldest in Croatia. He was a well known member of Šibenik's intellectual and social elites, who collaborated with Niccolò Tommaseo to catalog Slavic folk proverbs in the Šibenik region. Although he was a Dalmatian autonomist, the radical autonomists at that time criticized him as "a man of mild colors".

== Post-mortem sonnet ==
After his death on 19 March 1898, his unknown friend, signed Un amico, published a sonnet about him. The document, written originally in Dalmatian Venetian (translation into English by Anton Krnić) is the property of Roksanda Smolčić from Zagreb; it was presumably also published in Il Dalmata in 1898:

Sacred old man, tender like seraphim
Husband, father, citizen, brother
Upon your bier a kiss of esteem
Upon your cold coffin tears and flower

You were gentle, good, you were faithful
Like Gabriel the angel resembling
I try to soothe, in this painful
Part of earth, my cry and suffering

The tired eyes are forever closed
But your spirit noble and devout
Flew bright and pure to bosom of the Lord

And in your silent grave, in autumn and spring
Sacred old man, of hair white,
Dream in peace your dream everlasting
