= Konstantin Vojnović =

Croatian Serb politician and academic (1832–1903)

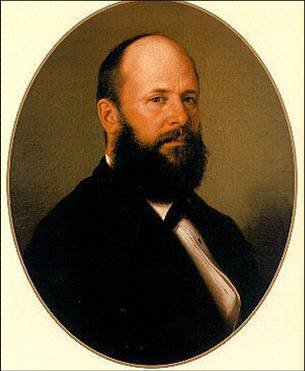
- Konstantin Vojnović, 1876 painting by Antonio Zuccaro

Personal details
- Born: March 2, 1832 Herceg Novi, Austrian Empire
- Died: May 20, 1903 (aged 71)
- Citizenship: Austro-Hungarian
- Profession: politician

Konstantin "Kosta" Vojnović (pronounced [konstǎntin kôsta ʋǒːjnoʋit͡ɕ]; Serbian Cyrillic: Константин Војновић; March 2, 1832 – May 20, 1903) was a Croatian Serb politician, university professor, and rector in the kingdoms of Dalmatia and Croatia-Slavonia of the Habsburg monarchy.

== Life ==
=== Family ===
Vojnović was born in Herceg Novi (Kingdom of Dalmatia, modern Montenegro) into the Serb Vojnović noble family. His grandfather Đorđe Vasiljević Vojnović (1760–1821) was a Russian military officer, he later returned to Boka Kotorska, and in 1800, in Ancona, he married Kasandra Angeli-Radovani from a Roman Catholic family. They had a son, Jovan. Count Jovan Đ. Vojinović (1811–1837) died at the age of 26, he married Katarina Gojković whose mother was of the family of Serbian Orthodox Metropolitan Stevan Stratimirović. Katarina later remarried to a Pellegrini. Jovan and Katarina had two sons, Konstantin (Kosta), and his brother Đorđe (Đura).

His brother Đorđe (1833–1895) was the mayor of Boka (1863–1877) and its representative deputy, and president of the Diet of Dalmatia in Zadar. As the people's deputy he fought against the Austrian politics that deliberately omitted the Bokan maritime affairs, which was the main occupation of his ancestors.

Konstantin and Đorđe were baptized in the Serbian Orthodox Savina monastery in Herceg Novi, however, their grandmother Kasandra later converted them into the Roman Catholic confession.

=== Career ===
He graduated law at the University of Vienna in the period 1851–54, received his Ph.D. in Padua in 1856. In Split he worked as a lawyer, a secretary of the Chamber of Merchants, legislative writer and a politician. He advocated unification of Dalmatia and Istria with Croatia and Slavonia. He was great supporter of Croatian independence in Austria-Hungary. As a member of the People's Party, he served as a representative in the Parliament of Dalmatia. At the recommendation of his close friend and a colleague Josip Juraj Strossmayer, he was elected in 1874 as a professor of Austrian law at the University of Zagreb.

He served twice as a prorector of the university: the first time during the rectorship of the first rector Matija Mesić, and the second time immediately after himself served as a rector in the academic year 1877/1878. In the period 1878–1884 he served as a representative in the Croatian parliament. He was a full member of the Yugoslav Academy of Sciences and Arts since 1890. Due to political reasons, expressing his disagreement with oppressive Magyarization, he was temporarily suspended from university service and retired in 1891. He returned to Dubrovnik and began research of the Dubrovnikan legislative history. He died in Dubrovnik at the age of 71.

== Marriage and children ==
He married Marija Seralji (Serragli; 1836-1922) from Dubrovnik in 1855. She was the daughter of Luigi de Serragli (1808-1902), an Italian businessman and bureaucrat, member of the Dalmatian Diet, and Kristina Đivović.

They had five children: Ivo, Lujo, Katica, Eugenija and Kristina.

== Legacy ==
Since 1933 a street in Zagreb is named after him.

Academic offices
| Preceded by Anton Kržan | Rector of the University of Zagreb; 1877 – 1878 | Succeeded by Franjo Maixner |
