= Narodni list =

Croatian weekly newspaper

- Type: Weekly Newspaper
- Format: Tabloid
- Publisher: Narodni list d.d.
- Editor: Simeona Pancirov
- Founded: 1862
- Language: Croatian
- Headquarters: Poljana Zemaljskog odbora 2, Zadar, Croatia
- ISSN: 1331-2421
- Website: http://www.narodni-list.hr

Narodni list (English: people's paper) is an independent Croatian weekly newspaper published in Zadar, founded in 1862, making it the oldest in Croatia. Narodni list, being independent, has a reputation of writing about things other newspapers dare not touch, such as corruption and nepotism among politicians, which often includes writing about organized crime.

This newspaper is not to be confused with Narodni list (USA) that was published in New York by Frank Zotti from 1895.

== History ==
The newspaper was started in 1862, making it the oldest living newspaper in Croatia, and a part of Croatian cultural history. The first issue of Narodni list was published on March 1, 1862, as a Croatian-language part of the Italian-language newspaper Il Nazionale. Since 1876, Narodni list is published entirely in Croatian, playing an important role in unification of Dalmatia and Croatia.

In 1871, Juraj Biankini became the editor of the Narodni list at urging of Mihovil Pavlinović, the leader of the Croatian National Revival in Dalmatia. He retained the position until 1918 (when Zadar was captured by the Kingdom of Italy enforcing the Treaty of London). Biankini's work helped the newspaper attain a leading position in the region.

From 1920 to 1946 Narodni list was not published due to Italian fascist government of Zadar and Dalmatia. After the war, Narodni list starts publishing again. At the time there was another Narodni list, daily newspaper published in Zagreb, so the Zadar newspaper was forced to briefly change the name to Glas Zadra (English: the voice of Zadar). After the newspaper from Zagreb ceased to exist, Narodni list recovered its name.

== Environment ==
The city of Zadar is being referred to as the "media miracle" for its massive number of newspapers, radio and TV stations compared to the population of the city. Zadar is also notorious in Croatia for being a "city of corruption", and a city where the populist right-wing political party HDZ never lost elections. Narodni list is the only independent media in the city, not related to any political party and not accepting donations of any kind.

== Editorial policy ==
The newspaper consists of investigative journalism articles (usually targeted against corruption in the city of Zadar), flamboyant columns by in-house journalists and prominent public figures, and many how-to articles about science, technology, lifestyle etc.
