= Drašnice =

Village in Croatia

- Location within Croatia
- Coordinates: 43.218958°N 17.110044°E
- Country: Croatia
- County: Split-Dalmatia
- Municipality: Podgora

Area
  - Total: 9.9 km^{2} (3.8 sq mi)

Population (2021)
  - Total: 286
  - Density: 29/km^{2} (75/sq mi)
- Time zone: UTC+1 (CET)
  - Summer (DST): UTC+2 (CEST)

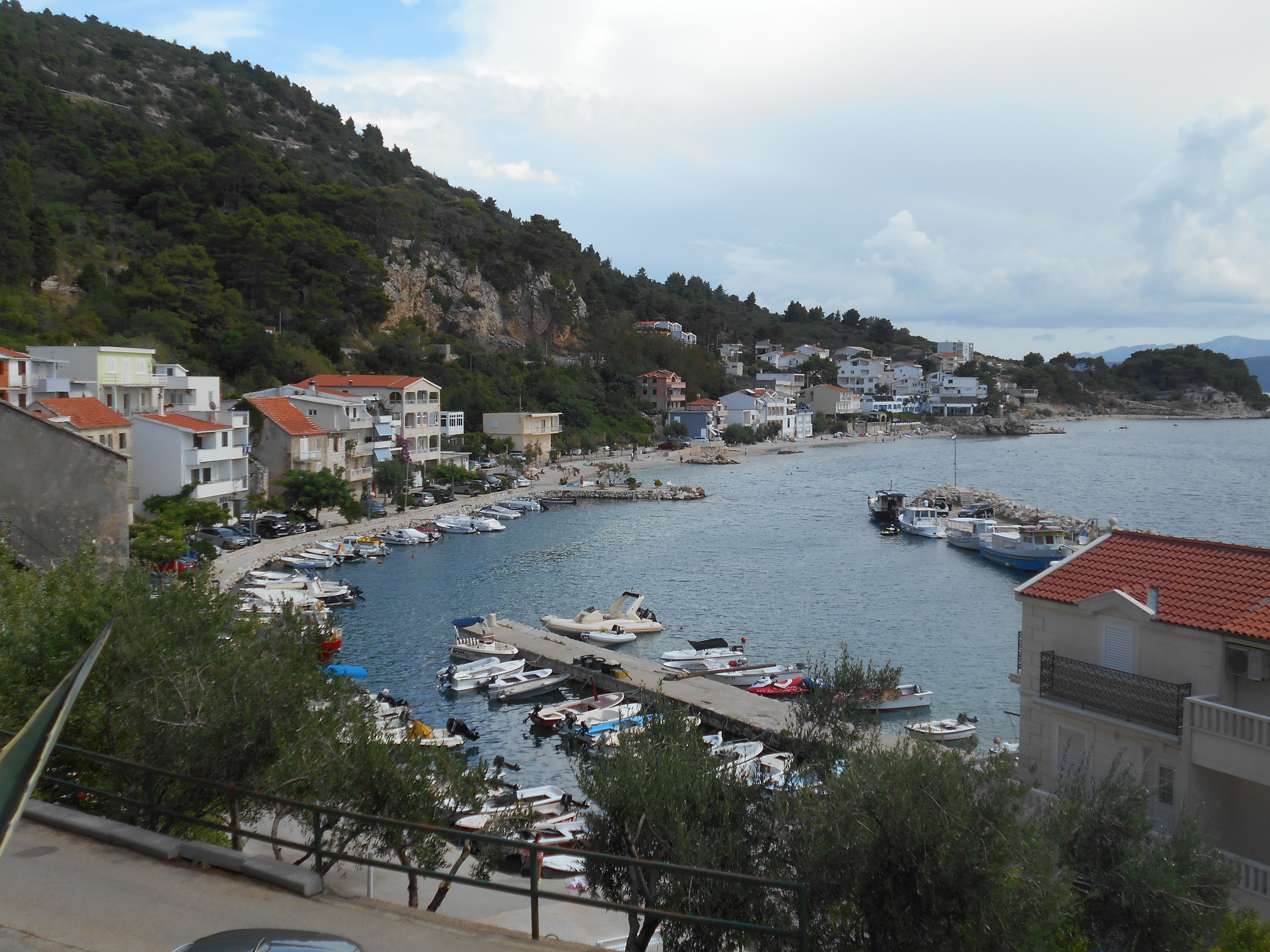
Drašnice

Drašnice is a tourist locality in southern Dalmatia, Croatia, located between Makarska and Ploče. Its population was recorded at 286 (as of the 2021 census).

The village lies at the base of the Biokovo mountain, at the Jadranska magistrala, and across the strait is the island of Hvar.
