= Natko Nodilo =

Croatian politician, historian, journalist, university professor and chancellor

Natko Nodilo (31 August 1834 – 21 May 1912) was a Croatian politician, historian, journalist, university professor, and chancellor of the University of Zagreb.

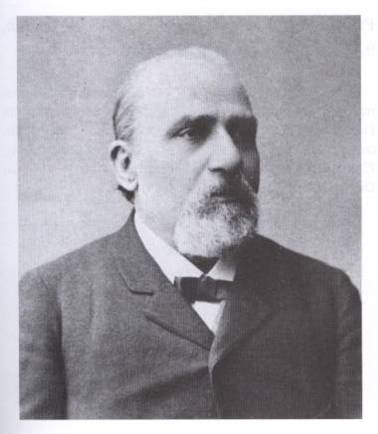
Natko Nodilo

Born in Split, he studied theology in Zadar until 1856, when he dropped out of college and took a job as an auxiliary teacher at the Classical Gymnasium in Split. He received a degree in history and geography in Vienna in 1861. He then turned to politics, becoming the editor of the new magazine Il Nazionale, in which he published articles on the principles of national and liberal politics. He was prosecuted in court because of his articles.

After abandoning his job as editor, he worked as a teacher at the high school in Zadar and as a representative of the People's Party in the Parliament of Dalmatia, advocating the unification of Dalmatia with Croatia.

In 1857 he was appointed as the first professor of general history at the University of Zagreb. After his term as chancellor for the 1890–91 academic year expired, he served as a vice chancellor the following academic year. He served as a dean of the faculty for two terms. He retired in 1901. From 1905 to 1908, he published a series of essays in which he elaborated his political convictions.

He studied the early medieval history of the Serbs, Croats, and southeast Europe, publishing the book Stara vjera Srba i Hrvata.

He authored the first general history of the Middle Ages in the South Slavic area. He died in Zagreb. A street in Zagreb was named in his honor in 1931.

== Links ==
- Nodilo's biography, at the University of Zagreb website

Academic offices
Preceded by Luka Marjanović	Rector of the University of Zagreb; 1890–1891	Succeeded by Ivan Bujanović
