= Michele Carlo Frari =

Michele Carlo Frari (also mentioned as Mihovil Frari in Croatian sources) (1813, Split – 1896, Padua?) was a professor of obstetrics in Padua from 1843 until 1889.

== Life and work ==
Michele Frari was the author of many obstetrical scientific articles and the inventor of various obstetrical instruments, including the so-called "Frari Forceps". He also published a textbook on obstetrics “Obstetrics theoretical and practical”, with its second edition that appeared in 1876. Michele Frari, who was the son of famous Šibenik-born physician and epidemiologist, Angelo Antonio Frari, also participated in the social life of Šibenik: in 1889 he took part in the discussion about possible location of Niccolò Tommaseo’s monument in Šibenik.

== Reflections on Frari's work ==
As a response to criticism by Dr Ferdinando Moroni, Dr Ghirotti from Padua vehemently defended Frari’s work in "Giornale veneto di science mediche" in 1868. Ghirotti accused Moroni of ignorance and avidity (as “being the aspirant on the position at the Cathedra in Padua”). Ghirotti discussed the obstetrical issues which were mentioned in the Frari's textbook, such as symphisiotomy, pelvic/fetal head diameters, fetal/maternal auscultation, geminal and extra-uterine pregnancy, mola, menstrual cycles, anatomical variations of the uterus, maternal alimentation, infertility, and death in utero. He concluded that Professor Michele Carlo Frari was a highly qualified obstetrician and skilled surgeon, reliable and extremely appreciated for his work, and that his textbook was “written according to true principals of the art, with the right criteria and argumentation, based on proper experience and on opinions of celebrated obstetricians of various nations” (20).

== Sources ==
- Krnić A. Giuseppe and Aloysius Frari's Works on Rabies and History of Frari Medical Family of Šibenik, Dalmatia. Croat Med J. 2007 June; 48(3): 378–390.
