= Frank Zotti =

Frank Zotti (1872–1947) was an American entrepreneur, publisher, steamship agent and banker.

Zotti migrated from the Bay of Kotor (then Austria-Hungary, today Montenegro) in 1889 and started out as a steamship agent. Later he became the owner of such a company, and eventually his company even purchased a transatlantic steamship, the Brooklyn. Zotti built up a fully-fledged bank at a New York address, the Amerikansko-Hrvatska Štedionica (American-Croat Savings Bank). He published the widely read Narodni list (USA) (National paper), a weekly newspaper, and he even managed to become president of the Hrvatska zajednica (Croat Union), which later transformed into the Croatian Fraternal Union (CFU).

Zotti's activities reached across the Atlantic, and he was perhaps the most illustrious example of South Slav migrant elites.

== Sources ==
- Frances Kraljic Curran, Ethnic Entrepreneur: Frank Zotti (1872–1947): A Croatian Immigrant Success Story, in Migracijske teme 5/1 (1989), 59–66;
- Bankrupt Banker Held for Larceny. Frank Zotti, Well-Known Italian, in the Tombs in Default of $25,000 Bail, in: New York Times, July 18, 1908.
