= Antonio Bajamonti =

Dalmatian Italian politician (1822–1891)

Mayor of Split
- In office 9 January 1860 – 1864
- Preceded by: Šimun de Michieli-Vitturi
- Succeeded by: Frano Lanza
- In office 1865–1880
- Preceded by: Frano Lanza
- Succeeded by: Aleksandar Nallini

Personal details
- Born: 19 February 1822 Split, Kingdom of Dalmatia, Austrian Empire
- Died: 13 January 1891 (aged 68) Split, Kingdom of Dalmatia, Austria-Hungary
- Party: Autonomist Party
- Spouse: Alojzija Kružević
- Education: University of Padua
- Occupation: Politician, medical doctor
- Profession: Physician

Antonio Bajamonti, drawing

Antonio Bajamonti (19 February 1822 – 13 January 1891) was an Austrian and Dalmatian Italian politician and longtime mayor of Split. He is remembered as one of the most successful mayors of the city, occupying the post almost continuously for twenty years (1860–1880). He was a medical doctor by profession. Bajamonti's parents were Giuseppe Bajamonti (Pretorial Chancellor of Vis) and Elena Candido of Šibenik.

== Mayor of Split ==
Bajamonti became Mayor of Split on 9 January 1860 for the Autonomist Party (succeeding Šimun de Michieli-Vitturi) and stayed in office until 1864, when he was relieved because of his opposition to Austrian centralism. He was replaced by Frano Lanza, but in 1865 he united with the People's Party into the Liberal Union and won the elections again.

He would go on to hold the post for over two decades, until 1880, when he retired from office and was succeeded by Aleksandar Nallini, another Autonomist. After democratic reforms allowed for a greater part of the populace to vote, Bajamonti's Autonomist Party lost the 1882 elections. Croatian Dalmatians, who made up the majority of the population of Split, were able to influence the vote sufficiently and a People's Party mayor was elected, Dujam Rendić-Miočević, a prominent Split lawyer.

== Diet of Dalmatia ==
Bajamonti was also a member of the Diet of Dalmatia (1861–91) and the Austrian Chamber of Deputies (1867–70 and 1873–79). He married Alojzija Kružević on 6 October 1849.

For many years Bajamonti enjoyed the support of Croats and Italians and in this period of relative social peace was the propeller of important public works.

In 1859, before his election, he built a public theatre with his own money. During his administration, gas lighting was installed instead of oil, the Society for the construction and embellishment of Split was established, the west wing of the representative building on the Prokurative square was built and the old Diocletian's aqueduct waterworks were renovated.

For his initiative Split was also equipped with a square surrounded by galleries. His most famous work was the construction of a large fountain that was named later after him. Three months after the second opening the fountain Antonio Bajamonti died. The fountain was demolished in 1947 by city authorities as a symbol of fascism and Italian occupation.

Bajamonti instituted the policy Dalmatian Society (1886) and Società Accommodation Split (1888), until, severely indebted, died in his hometown on 13 January 1891. When he died, the information about his death was displayed in almost all the press in Italy.

== See also ==
- House of Bajamonti
- Dalmatia
- Dalmatianism

Political offices
| Preceded by Šimun de Michieli-Vitturi | Mayor of Split; 1860 – 1864 | Succeeded by Frano Lanza |
| Preceded by Frano Lanza | Mayor of Split; 1865 – 1880 | Succeeded by Aleksandar Nallini |
