= Stjepan Mitrov Ljubiša =

Serbian writer and politician (1824–1878)

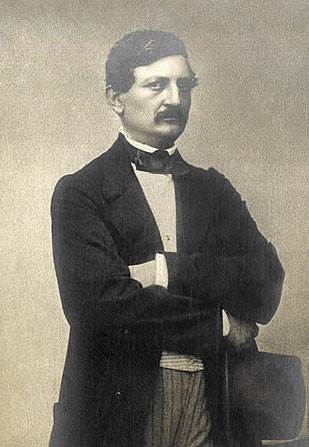

President of the Diet of Dalmatia
- In office 1870–1876
- Preceded by: Špiro Petrović
- Succeeded by: Đorđe Vojnović

Personal details
- Born: 29 February 1824 Budva, Austrian Empire (modern-day Montenegro)
- Died: 11 November 1878 (aged 54) Vienna, Austria-Hungary (modern-day Austria)
- Party: People's Party
- Occupation: writer, politician

Stjepan (modernist: Stefan) Mitrov Ljubiša (Serbian Cyrillic: Стјепан Митров Љубиша; 29 February 1824 – 11 November 1878), was a Serbian writer and politician. He is famous for his unique short stories, generally ranked among the masterpieces of Serbian literature in his day. These stories are also a symbol of the Serbian rebirth, both for its patriotic message and because it was a fundamental milestone in the Serbian language reform.

== Biography ==
Ljubiša was born in the town of Budva, at the time part of the Austrian Empire. His paternal family hailed from the Paštrovići tribe. One of his cousins was Visarion Ljubiša (1823–84), who became the Metropolitan of Montenegro from 1882 to 1884. His father Mitar (hence the patronymic Mitrov) was a seaman whom he rarely saw and died when Stjepan was only 14 years old. His education, mostly in the Italian language, went irregularly since he had to work to help support his family from an early age. Therefore, Ljubiša became an autodidact, educating himself from the books he could find. But the love for national literature revealed itself through the writings of Vuk Karadžić, and his association with Vuk Vrčević, Karadžić's faithful collaborator.

When only 19, he was elected to the post of the secretary of the town of Budva. This job forced him into learning more on current laws and was soon considered by the plain folks to be a lawyer and was often approached as such. He started writing court records and even operated as a defender in the local court of law. This self-thought knowledge of his was then acknowledged by the authorities and without taking a judiciary exam he became a public notary.

In the revolutionary 1848, Ljubiša was an active member of the ad hoc assembly of Boka Kotorska in Prčanj and held a number of speeches against the Italian cultural dominance and for South-Slav unity.

In 1861 he was elected as the deputy of Boka in the Dalmatian parliament in Zadar and not long afterwards he was sent to the parliament in Vienna as an MP of the People's Party (then still gathering both Serbs and Croats). From then on he was constantly re-elected to the parliaments in Vienna, and in Zadar. From 1870 to 1876, he was the president of the Dalmatian parliament. In 1878, he was overthrown by the clerical Croat fraction in the National Party led by Mihovil Pavlinović. In his political efforts, he fought against the ethnic Italian domination in Dalmatian politics and culture, for the equality of religions and languages, for the emancipation of Serb populace in Dalmatia, the economic benefit of the province but also for the autonomy of Dalmatia and against the unification with Croatia-Slavonia.

Literary critic and historian Jovan Skerlić points out in his book that Ljubiša wrote: Izmeću Bara i Zadra bilo u izobraženoj vrsti samo sedam ljudi, koji nijesu bili izgubili svijest svog imena i porekla. "Between Bar and Zadar there were approximately only seven people, who had not lost track of their ancestral name and descent," demonstrating the extent of Italian influence on the Dalmatian and Montenegrin littoral.

His literary work started in 1845 when, led by the ethnographical example of Vuk Karadžić's collaborator, Vuk Vrčević, who eventually became Ljubiša's friend. Ljubiša then went on to publish in "Serbian-Dalmatian Magazine" (Сербско-далматински магазин, Serbsko-dalmatinski magazin) notes on life and customs of his Paštrovići tribe. In 1868, he also published the first edition of Njegoš's "Mountain Wreath" in Serbian Latin script. His first short story, Sćepan the Little (Šćepan Mali), was published in 1868. He sailed in literary waters more actively from 1870, continuing with short stories. All of them appeared in magazines and newspapers his only book being the 1875 "Montenegrin and Littoral Stories" (Приповијести црногорске и приморске, Pripovijesti crnogorske i primorske). In 1877, he started with publishing one hundred short stories named "The Storytelling of Vuk Dojčević" of which only 37 appeared, owing to his premature death. In 1878 Srpska zora ("Serb Dawn") magazine in Vienna published his autobiography.

Skerlić compared Ljubiša with his contemporaries, stating that "What Joksim Nović-Otočanin and Jovan Sundečić did for poetry, Ljubiša did for prose writing."

Visiting Cetinje to attend the consecration of his cousin Visarion Ljubiša, who was being elevated to a Metropolitan bishop of the Serbian Orthodox Church, Ljubiša fell ill and on his return to Vienna died on 11 November 1878. His earthly remains were transferred to Budva in 1885.

His great-great-granddaughter is Marina Perazić, one of the most popular pop singers in the former Yugoslavia during the 1980s.

== Literary work ==
Coming from the rural background and treasuring all his life contacts with the peasants, Ljubiša wrote in excellent Serbian, which was his strongest source of inspiration. His stories are full with folklore elements, sayings, vivid characters that all showed the character of Serbian people in the Littoral. Comparing his inspiration, national orientation and closed relation with folklore he was dubbed "Njegoš in prose". Although he spent his life in the time of romanticism, his works have an intention of closer and more genuine representation of folk life and therefore Ljubiša is considered one of the first realists in Serb literature. His works remain popular to this very date.

His best known works are;

- Boj na Visu
- Šćepan Mali
- Pripovijesti crnogorske i primorske (Dubrovnik, 1875; Belgrade, 1876)
- The Sale of Patriarch Brkić (Prodaja partijare Brkića)
- Kanjoš Macedonović
- Jump Girl (Skočiđevojka)
- Priest Andrović, the new Obilić (Pop Andrović, novi Obilić)
- Stealing and Re-Stealing of the Bell (Krađa i prekrađa zvona)
- Storytelling of Vuk Dojčević (Pričanja Vuka Dojčevića)

He is also recognized as an excellent translator of the works of Horace, Dante, and Ariosto.

== Nationality ==
When in 1878 he was disposed and booed by the Croats in the Dalmatian parliament, he replied: "I know why you can’t stand me – because I’m a Serb by nationality and of Orthodox faith."

== Literature ==
S. M. Ljubiša, Pripovetke, Novi Sad – Beograd, 1957 Miroslav Luketić, Budva, Sveti Stefan, Petrovac, Budva – Cetinje 1966
