= Diet of Dalmatia =

Regional parliament of Dalmatia within Austria 1861–1918

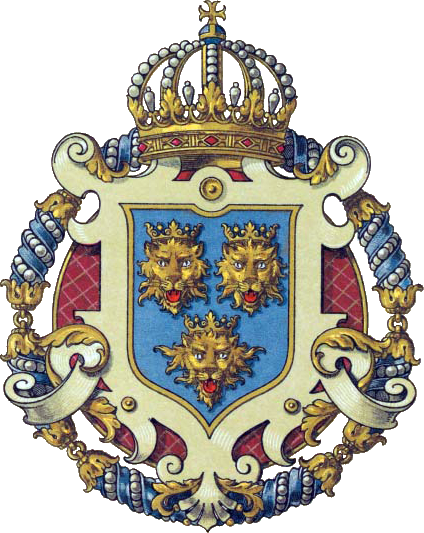
Coat of arms of the Kingdom of Dalmatia

The Diet of Dalmatia (Croatian: Dalmatinski sabor, Italian: Dieta della Dalmazia) was the regional assembly of the Kingdom of Dalmatia within the Austro-Hungarian Empire. It was founded in Zadar in 1861 and last convened in 1912, before being formally dissolved in 1918, with the demise of the Empire.

Since the founding of the Dalmatian diet, the pro-Italian Autonomist Party held the parliamentary majority until 1870, when the (Croatian-Serbian) People's Party won the parliamentary election. Croatian then became the official language of the diet in 1883.

== The premises ==
Under the constitutional reforms promoted by Emperor Franz Joseph I of Austria, under an imperial decree dated 20 October 1860, the Empire underwent a form of "federalization", following the majority opinion of the Board Empire. According to these determinations, many legislative and judicial powers were conferred onto every province in the kingdom through the reconstitution of the powers—or the creation of new powers—as part of the formation of a proper Diet.

In Croatia, the imperial law, accompanied by the first convocation of the local diet, was warmly welcomed. An imperial autograph in Vienna on 5 December 1860 created: a 'courtly department' (ministry) for Croatia-Slavonia; introduced the Croatian language in the administration of these territories; and declared that the demands of rebuilding the ancient tiara-Slavonia-Croatian Dalmatian be accommodated, thereby postponing a final decision, when Dalmatia—still lacking a provincial assembly—was able to express its political will. An agreement was also made, whereby a political representation of Dalmatia was sent to Zagreb to discuss the issue at a conference chaired by the Ban of Croatia, the highest political authority in the territory of Croatia-Slavonia.

The imperial autograph produced various representations in Dalmatian cities. It was particularly the city of Split congregation—led by Antonio Bajamonti—that was distinguished by the bitterness of protests. The protestors appealed to Francis Joseph to convene the provincial assembly of Dalmatia before taking a decision on the constitutional arrangements of the province within the Empire.

On the basis of Split, most of the Dalmatian municipalities refused to send their representatives to Zagreb; instead, these municipalities decided to form a delegation that went to Vienna to argue the case that the annexation of Croatia should not proceed. Meanwhile, the imperial court began to fear that the granting of overly broad powers to the diets would facilitate the unleashing of domestic forces, thereby reducing the authority of the emperor.

In February 1861, several meetings of the Council of Ministers of Austria were held, in which the attendees discussed, at length, the problem of Dalmatia and a possible meeting with Croatia. Ivan Mažuranić, chairman of the department courtly for Croatia-Slavonia, pleaded in support of the cause, supported by Foreign Minister Bernhard von Rechberg; von Rechberg considered the need for the union to counter an alleged "Italian threat" against the Dalmatian as necessary. Rechberg further claimed that such action would strengthen the Slavic element in Dalmatia that was loyal to Austria. The positions of the Dalmatian separatists were supported by Liberal Party politicians, who managed to persuade the emperor to postpone the decision; a provincial Dalmatian assembly was subsequently set up and it would later negotiate with Croatian representatives in regard to the possibility of unification.

== The creation of the Diet ==
On the recommendation of the German-speaking Liberals, Francis Joseph issued a license by 26 February 1861 that created an Imperial Parliament (composed of the House and Senate) with extensive legislative powers—this drastically reduced the powers that were previously planned for the provincial assembly. Within this patent, 15 were approved statutes of the reconstituted provincial assembly, with its Sabor regulations, and this provided for an electoral system that only granted voting rights to those who could pay a minimal fee.

The electoral system was based on four curiae that represented various social bodies (the seat of the Diet was Zara):

- The high census (elected by ten representatives in Dalmatia)
- The cities (elected by eight representatives in Dalmatia)
- The chambers of commerce (elected by three representatives in Dalmatia)
- The rural municipalities (elected by twenty representatives in Dalmatia)

The electoral system favoured the bourgeois and aristocratic classes, as well as the urban population over people in rural areas.

== The first Diet of 1861 ==
Between 24 March 1861 and 30 March 1861, the first elections for the provincial assembly of Dalmatia were held—the Dalmatian parliamentary election of 1861. The separatists won 29 seats out of 41.

| Party | Seats |
|---|---|
| Autonomist Party | 29 |
| People's Party | 12 |
| Total | 41 |

=== Elected representatives ===
==== Autonomist Party ====
From Zadar:

- Vittorio Bioni
- Cosimo de Begna Possedaria
- Vincenzo Duplancich
- Antonio Smirich (from 1863: Giovanni Salghetti-Drioli)
- Antonio Bajamonti
- Spiro Petrović
- Natale Filippi
- Giacomo Ghiglianovich
- Francesco Borreli

From Split:

- Leonardo Dudan
- Giorgio Giovannizio
- Luigi Lapenna
- Vincenzo degli Alberti

From Šibenik:

- Antonio Galvani

From Makarska

- Giacomo Vucovich

From Dubrovnik:

- Giovanni Radmilli
- Luigi Serragli

From Korčula:

- Giovanni Smerchinich

From Hvar:

- Girolamo Macchiedo
- Giovanni Macchiedo
- Girolamo Vusio

From Skradin:

- Simeone Bujas
- Giovanni Marasović

From Drniš:

- Melchiorre Difnico

From Trogir:

- Antonio Radman
- Antonio Fanfogna

From Sinj:

- Josip Dešković
- Anton Buljan

From Imotski:

- Niccolò Mirossevich

==== People's Party ====
From Dubrovnik:

- Miho Klaić
- Marino Giorni

From Kotor:

- Josip Gjurović (from 1863 Kosta Vojnović)
- Bernardo Verona (from 1863 Josip Banović-Damianović)

From Benkovac:

- Petar Radulović

From Drnis:

- Pane Sablić
- Krsto Kulišić

From Vrgorac:

- Miho Pavlinović

From Cavtat:

- Djure Pulić

From Ston:

- Krsto Jerković

From Budva:

- Luka Tripcović
- Stjepan Mitrov Ljubiša

President of the Diet: Spiro Petrović (Autonomist Party)

On 18 April 1861, the Diet passed a motion submitted by Baiamonti and Galvani to reject the request for a unification of Dalmatian with Croatia and Slavonia—only two dissenting votes were submitted.

== Diet of 1864 ==
| Party | Seats |
|---|---|
| Autonomist Party | 32 |
| People's Party | 9 |
| Total | 41 |

Elected from the Autonomist Party in the Dalmatian parliamentary election of 1864:

Girolamo Alesani (1864–1866), Antonio Bajamonti, Cosimo de Begna Possedaria, Vittorio Bioni, Orsatto Bonda, Giuseppe Descovich (1866–1867), Melchiorre Difnico, Pietro Doimi, Stefano Doimi, Giovanni Fanfogna, Natale Filippi (1866–1867), Antonio Galvani, Giacomo Ghiglianovich (1866–1867), Nicola Lallich, Francesco Lanza, Luigi Lapenna (1864–1866), Giovanni Battista Macchiedo (or Machiedo), Pietro Doimo Maupas, Luigi Mery, Simeone Michieli Vitturi, Andrea Nicolich, Spiridione Petrovich, Giuseppe Piperata, Valerio Ponte, Giovanni Radmilli, Simeone Rossignoli, Luigi Serragli, Antonio Stermich, Giacomo Vucovich, Vincenzo Vuletich, Ivan Zaffron and Francesco Zanchi.

President of Diet: Spiro Petrović (Autonomist Party)

== Diet of 1867 ==
| Partito | Seats |
|---|---|
| Autonomist Party | 26 |
| People's Party | 15 |
| Total | 41 |

Elected from the Autonomist Party in the Dalmatian parliamentary election of 1867:

Girolamo Alesani (1869–1870), Antonio Bajamonti, Cosimo de Begna Possedaria, Vittorio Bioni, Agostino Cindro, Giuseppe Descovich (1867–1868), Stefano Doimi (1867–1869), Giovanni Fanfogna, Gaetano Frari, Luigi Frari, Giacomo Ghiglianovich, Giorgio Giovannizio, Stefano Knezevich (Croatian People's Party), Luigi Lapenna, Enrico Matcovich, Pietro Doimo Maupas, Andrea Nicolich, Spiridione Petrovich, Giuseppe Piperata, Antonio Radman, Antonio Rolli, Simeone de Rossignoli, Giovanni Salghetti-Drioli, Luigi Serragli, Giacomo Vucovich, Vincenzo Vuletich and Giovanni Zaffron.

President of Diet: Spiro Petrović (Autonomist Party)

== Diet of 1870 ==
| Party | Seats |
|---|---|
| People's Party | 25 |
| Autonomist Party | 16 |
| Total | 41 |

President of the Diet: Stjepan Mitrov Ljubiša (People's Party)

Elected from the Autonomist Party in the Dalmatian parliamentary election of 1870:

Vincenzo Alesani, Antonio Bajamonti, Cosimo de Begna Possedaria (1870–1873), Natale Filippi (1870–1873), Gaetano Frari, Matteo Gligo, Stefano Knezevich, Andrea Krussevich (1872–1873 e 1875-1876), Francesco Lanza (1870–1874), Luigi Lapenna (1872–1873), Pietro Doimo Maupas, Luigi Mery, Francesco Milcovich (1874–1876), Giuseppe Mladineo (1871–1874), Luigi Nutrizio (1875–1876), Giuseppe Piperata (1871–1873), Valerio Ponte (1870-1870), Giuseppe Radman (1874–1876), Simeone Rossignoli (1874–1876), Niccolò Trigari (1874–1876) and Vincenzo Vuletich (1871–1876).

For the first time, the People's Party won the Dalmatian election; however, the Croat majority did not recognise the validity of the election of many representatives from the Autonomist Party and this resulted in a series of resignations and replacements, in addition to a tense political environment. The Diets held power over the schools within the Empire and, due to the political situation of the time, closed all of the Italian schools in Dalmatia, with the exception of those in Zadar. It was during this period that Miho Klaic, the head of the People's Party (from Dubrovnik), delivered a speech to the Diet in which he spoke of the increase in the population of Dalmatian Italians in Dalmatia.

== Diet of 1876 ==
| Party | Seats |
|---|---|
| People's Party | 30 |
| Autonomist Party | 11 |
| Total | 41 |

Elected from the Autonomist Party in the Dalmatian parliamentary election of 1876:

Pietro Abelich, Antonio Bajamonti, Cosimo de Begna Possedaria (1878–1880), Giovanni Botteri, Gustavo Ivanich, Stefano Knezevich, Pietro Doimo Maupas, Cesare Pellegrini Danieli, Giovanni Smerchinich and Niccolò Trigari.

President: Đorđe Vojnović (People's Party—renamed "Serb Party" after 1879)

== Diet of 1883 ==
| Party | Seats |
|---|---|
| Croatian People's Party | 26 |
| Serbian Party | 8 |
| Autonomist Party | 7 |
| Total | 41 |

Elected from the Autonomist Party in the Dalmatian parliamentary election of 1883:

Antonio Bajamonti (1888), Gustavo Ivanich (1883–1885), Michele Kapovich (1883-1889), Pietro Doimo Maupas, Giuseppe Messa, Giuseppe Pezzi, Antonio Radman (1885–1886), Luigi Serragli (1883–1885), Leopoldo Stermich and Niccolò Trigari.

President: Đorđe Vojnović (Serb Party) Vice president: Michele Kapovich (Autonomist Party)

The Dalmatian Slavs were divided for the first time in a Diet election and the People's Party became the People's Party known also as the People's Croatian Party (Narodna hrvatska stranka), while Serbs formed the Serbian Party (Srpska stranka).

== Diet of 1889 ==
| Party | Seats |
|---|---|
| Croatian People's Party | 26 |
| Serbian Party | 9 |
| Autonomist Party | 6 |
| Total | 41 |

Elected from the Autonomist Party in the Dalmatian parliamentary election of 1889:

Antonio Bajamonti (end to 1891), Lorenzo Benevenia, Pietro Doimo Maupas (end to 1891), Baldassarre Podich, Ercolano Salvi (dal 1891), Antonio Smirich, Niccolò Trigari and Niccolò de' Vidovich.

President: Đorđe Vojnović (Serbian Party)

== Diet of 1895 ==
| Party | Seats |
|---|---|
| People's Party | 23 |
| Serbian Party | 9 |
| Autonomist Party | 6 |
| Party of Rights | 3 |
| Total | 41 |

Elected from the Autonomist Party in the Dalmatian parliamentary election of 1895:

Roberto Ghiglianovich, Giovanni Lubin, Ercolano Salvi, Stefano Smerchinich, Niccolò Trigari and Luigi Ziliotto.

President: Miho Klaić (People's Party—until 1896) and Gajo Bulat (People's Party—from 1896 to 1901)

== Diet of 1901 ==
| Party | Seats |
|---|---|
| People's Party | 18 |
| Party of Rights | 9 |
| Serbian Party | 6 |
| Autonomist Party | 6 |
| Pure Party of Rights | 2 |
| Total | 41 |

Elected from the Autonomist Party in the Dalmatian parliamentary election of 1901:

Roberto Ghiglianovich, Natale Krekich, Luigi Pini (dal 1903), Ercolano Salvi, Stefano Smerchinich, Niccolò Trigari (ens to 1902) and Luigi Ziliotto.

President: Vicko Ivčević (People's Party—from 1905 the Croatian Party formed as a fusion of the Croatian People's Party and the majority of the Dalmatian Party of Rights)

== Diet of 1908 ==
| Party | Seats |
|---|---|
| Croatian Party | 22 |
| Party of Rights | 8 |
| Serbian Party | 7 |
| Autonomist Party | 6 |
| Total | 43 |

Elected from the Autonomist Party in the Dalmatian parliamentary election of 1908:

Roberto Ghiglianovich, Natale Krekich, Luigi Pini (1910–1918), Ercolano Salvi, Stefano Smerchinich and Luigi Ziliotto.

President: Vicko Ivčević (Croatian Party)

== Presidents of the Diet ==
The speakers of the Diet were titled provincial captains (Italian: capitano provinciale/pl. capitani provinciali, German: Landeshauptmann/pl. Landeshauptleute). The first, second and third Diet presidents were Serbian, while latter three were Croatian.

- Špiro Petrović (1861–1870) - Autonomist Party
- Stjepan Mitrov Ljubiša (1870–1876) - People's Party
- Đorđe Vojnović (1877–1895) - People's Party (from 1879 the Serbian People's Party or the Serbian Party formed by the Serbs from the People's Party)
- Miho Klaic (1896) - Croatian People's Party formed by the Croatians from the People's Party in 1883, formally in 1889
- Gajo Bulat (1896–1900) - Croatian People's Party
- Vicko Ivčević (1900–1918) - Croatian People's Party (from 1905 the Croatian Party)

== Sources ==
- R.de' Vidovich, Albo d'Oro delle Famiglie Nobili Patrizie e Illustri nel Regno di Dalmazia, Fondazione Scientifico Culturale Rustia Traine, Trieste 2004
- L.Monzali, Italiani di Dalmazia. Dal Risorgimento alla Grande Guerra, Le Lettere, Firenze 2004
- L.Monzali, Italiani di Dalmazia. 1914-1924, Le Lettere, Firenze 2007
- F.Semi-V.Tacconi (cur.), Istria e Dalmazia. Uomini e tempi. Dalmazia, Del Bianco, Udine 1992
- A.Tamaro, La Dalmazia e il Risorgimento Nazionale, Stabilimento Cromo-Lito-Tipografico Evaristo Armani, Roma 1918
- L.Vulicevic, Partiti e lotte in Dalmazia, Stabilimento Tipografico e Calcografico del "Tergesteo", Trieste 1875
