= People's Party (Dalmatia) =

People's Party Narodna stranka
- Founded: 1861
- Dissolved: 1905
- Newspaper: Narodni list
- Ideology: Croatian nationalism Liberalism

People's Party (Croatian: Narodna stranka) was a political party in the Kingdom of Dalmatia. It was founded in 1861 after the failure of Bach's absolutism, as a branch of the People's Party in Kingdom of Croatia-Slavonia. Its members were known as narodnjaci, aneksionisti or puntari.

Its political goal was uniting Dalmatia with Croatia and Slavonia, stemming from their ideological origins in the Illyrian movement. It also gathered prominent Dalmatian Italians as well as Dalmatian Serbs. However, a Serb faction splintered in 1878, led by Stjepan Mitrov Ljubiša, into the Serb People's Party. From 1887 People's Party was renamed People's Croatian Party (Narodna hrvatska stranka), as a result of an internal compromise between the conservative majority led by Miho Klaić and a radical minority led by Mihovil Pavlinović and Juraj Biankini.

It united with the Party of Rights in 1905 into the "Croatian Party".

== Notable members ==
- Gajo Bulat
- Miho Klaić
- Lovro Monti
- Vid Morpurgo
- Natko Nodilo
- Mihovil Pavlinović
- Lujo Bakotić
- Jovan Sundečić
- Konstantin Vojnović
- Stefan Mitrov Ljubiša

== Diet of Dalmatia elections ==
- 1861: 29/41
- 1864: 9/41
- 1867: 15/41
- 1870: 26/41
- 1876: 30/41
- 1883: 26/41
- 1889: 26/41
- 1895: 23/41
- 1901: 18/41
