= Autonomist Party =

Italian-Dalmatianist Political party

Autonomist Party Partito Autonomista Autonomaška stranka
- Leaders: Niccolò Tommaseo; Leonardo Dudan; Francesco Ghetaldi-Gondola; Antonio Bajamonti
- Founder: Niccolò Tommaseo
- Founded: 1865
- Dissolved: 1915
- Ideology: Dalmatianism (official); Italian irredentism Conservatism
- Political position: Right-wing

The Autonomist Party (Italian: Partito Autonomista; Croatian: Autonomaška stranka) was an Italian-Dalmatianist political party in the Dalmatian political scene, that existed for around 70 years of the 19th century and until World War I. Its goal was to maintain the autonomy of the Kingdom of Dalmatia within the Austro-Hungarian Empire, as opposed to the unification with the Kingdom of Croatia-Slavonia. The Autonomist Party has been accused of secretly having been a pro-Italian movement due to their defense of the rights of ethnic Italians in Dalmatia. The Autonomist Party did not claim to be an Italian movement, and indicated that it sympathized with a sense of heterogeneity amongst Dalmatians in opposition to ethnic nationalism. In the 1861 elections, the Autonomists won twenty-seven seats in Dalmatia, while Dalmatia's Croatian nationalist movement, the National Party, won only fourteen seats. This number rapidly decreased: already in 1870 autonomists lost their majority in the Diet, while in 1908 they won just 6 out of 43 seats.

== History ==
Traditionally linked to the idea of a Dalmatian nation advocated by Niccolò Tommaseo in the first half of the 19th century and regarded as a meeting of the Latin world with the Slavic world, initially the party also attracted the sympathies of several Slavic Dalmatians, while maintaining an undisputed open to the Italian cultural world.

The Dalmatian branch of the People's Party (Croatian: Narodna stranka, Italian: Partito del Popolo), which supported the unification of Dalmatia with the Kingdom of Croatia-Slavonia in Hungary, viewed the Autonomists as supportive of an Italian annexation of Dalmatia, which later on would have been indeed the ambition of the Italian state. The Autonomist Party received the vote of the Dalmatian Italians and a number of bilingual Slavs, both Croats and Serbs, and controlled most Dalmatian coastal cities: this party had a majority in the Parliament of Dalmatia in the mid-19th century. However, in 1870 democratic alterations to the electoral laws allowed the majority Croatian population of Dalmatia to influence the elections for the first time. The democratic reforms allowed for a greater part of the general population to vote (but even areas where non-Slav population was the majority were affected) and so the Autonomist Party no longer had a majority: by the outbreak of World War I, only the city of Zara (now called Zadar) remained in Autonomist hands.

A similar but independent political development occurred in Fiume, where Michele Maylender, claiming greater autonomy from the centralizing Hungarian executive of Dezső Bánffy, founded the (Fiume) Autonomist Party in 1896. Although the reference with Dalmatia was never made explicit among Fiume autonomists (who widely read Tommaseo and Bajamonti) the goals of the Party were very similar to that in Dalmatia as it opposed the inclusion of the city to Croatia.

As in Zara the party remained in power up to 1914, and both cities, although claimed by the Kingdom of Serbs, Croats and Slovenes at the Paris Peace Conference, were finally assigned to Italy: Zara by the Treaty of Rapallo and Fiume with the Treaty of Rome, which gave Fiume to Italy and the adjacent port of Sušak to Yugoslavia.

Antonio Bajamonti, the most prominent Autonomist in the history of the party, once remarked:

No joy, only pain and tears, is brought by being a part of the Italian party in Dalmatia. We, the Italians of Dalmatia, retain a single right: to suffer.

Count Francesco Borelli Dalmatian deputy, argued for the autonomy of the Kingdom of Dalmatia, claiming that it had no connection whatsoever with Croatia. Though he admitted that the majority of the population was Slavic in language, mentality and outlook, he claimed that Dalmatia's "higher" culture was Italian.

At the beginning of the 20th century the Autonomist Party, having lost his majority in nearly all Dalmatia, started to be dominated by a group of Dalmatian Italians from Zara, led by Luigi Ziliotto and Giovanni Bugatto, who supported Italian irredentism in Dalmatia: the party was suppressed in 1915 when Italy declared war on Austria during World War I.

== Diet of Dalmatia elections ==
- 1861: 12/41
- 1864: 32/41
- 1867: 26/41
- 1870: 16/41
- 1876: 11/41
- 1883: 7/41
- 1889: 6/41
- 1895: 6/41
- 1901: 6/41

== Sources ==
- Renzo de' Vidovich, Albo d'Oro delle Famiglie Nobili Patrizie e Illustri nel Regno di Dalmazia, Fondazione Scientifico Culturale Rustia Traine, Trieste 2004
- L.Monzali, Italiani di Dalmazia. Dal Risorgimento alla Grande Guerra, Le Lettere, Firenze 2004
- L.Monzali, Italiani di Dalmazia. 1914-1924, Le Lettere, Firenze 2007.
- Monzali, Luciano.Italiani di Dalmazia Toronto University Press. Toronto, 2009
- I. Perić, Dalmatinski sabor 1861-1912 (1918), Zadar 1978.
- Duško Kečkemet, Bajamonti i Split, Slobodna Dalmacija: Split 2007.
- Grga Novak, Prošlost Dalmacije knjiga druga, Marjan tisak: Split 2004.
- Josip Vrandečić, Dalmatinski autonomistički pokret u XIX. stoljeću, Zagreb, 2002.
