= Stanko Banić (priest, born 1886) =

- Born: 1886; Donji Dolac, Dalmatia, Austria-Hungary (now Croatia)
- Died: July 16, 1932 (aged 45–46); Zagreb, Yugoslavia (now Croatia)
- Education: Seminary in Zadar
- Occupations: Politician, priest
- Political party: Slovene People's Party

Stanko Banić (1886 – 16 July 1932) was a Croatian and Yugoslavian Catholic priest and politician.

Banić was born in Donji Dolac near Omiš. He attended high school in Split and studied theology at the Seminary in Zadar. He was ordained and served as a priest in rural Dalmatian hinterland. In the final weeks of the World War I, Banić became a representative of Dalmatia in the National Council of Slovenes, Croats and Serbs, an ad-hoc body established in the process of dissolution of Austria-Hungary. Following the establishment of the Kingdom of Serbs, Croats and Slovenes (subsequently renamed Yugoslavia) as a common state of the South Slavs, Banić won a parliamentary seat in the 1920 Kingdom of Serbs, Croats and Slovenes Constitutional Assembly election. He was a supporter of the Slovene People's Party. Banić moved to Belgrade and there he was appointed the chaplain of the Army of the Kingdom of Serbs, Croats and Slovenes. He was the editor of the Jadranska straža journal published by the Jadranska straža association. Banić died in 1932 in Zagreb.
