= Jadran (training ship) =

Sailing ship for basic naval training

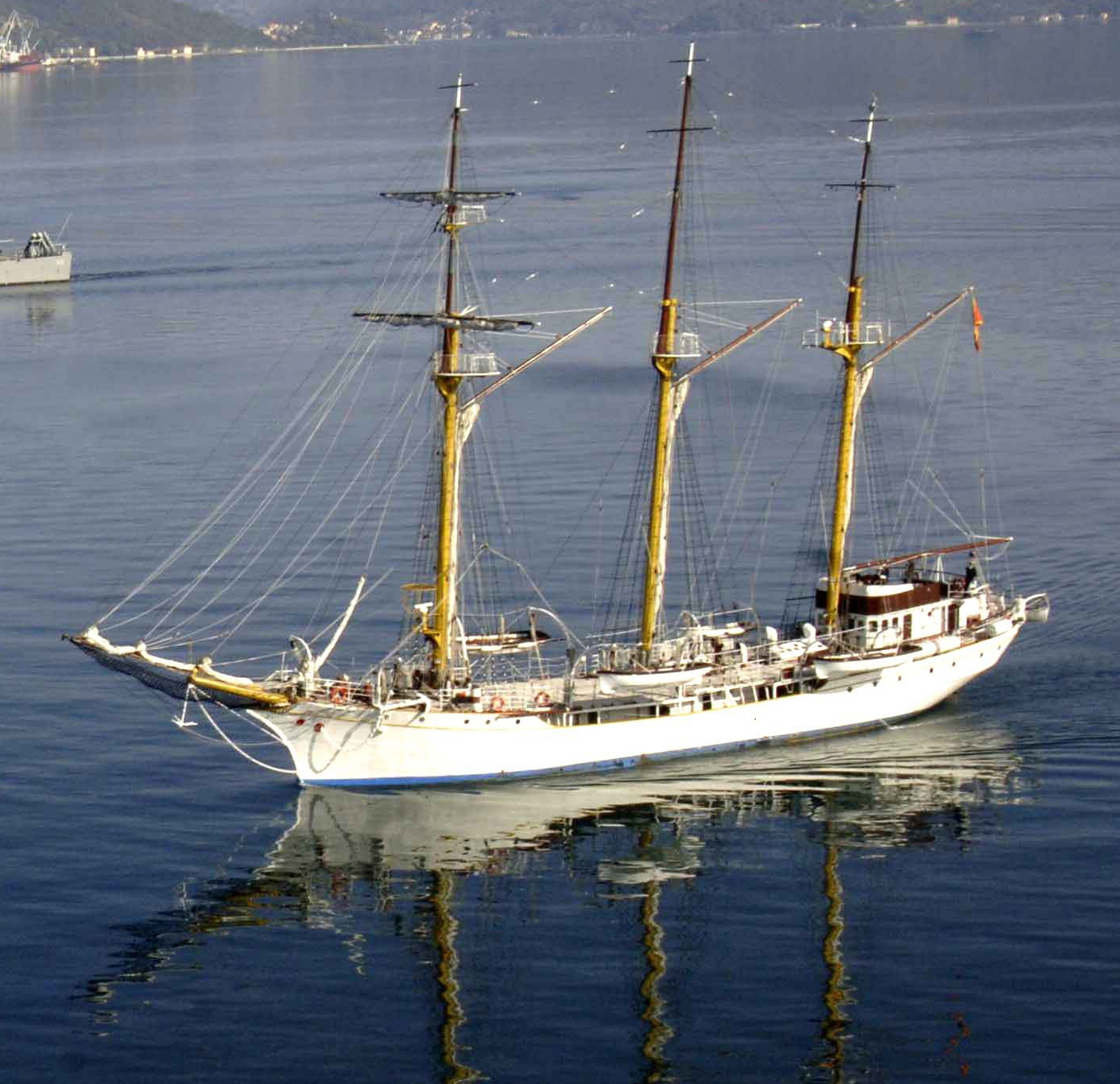
- Jadran in Tivat harbour

History

Kingdom of Yugoslavia
- Name: Jadran
- Namesake: Adriatic Sea
- Ordered: 4 September 1930
- Builder: H. C. Stülcken Sohn, Hamburg
- Cost: 8,407,030 dinars
- Laid down: 1930
- Launched: 25 June 1931
- Commissioned: 19 August 1933
- Fate: Captured by Italians in April 1941

Kingdom of Italy
- Name: Marco Polo
- Namesake: Marco Polo
- Acquired: 1941
- Fate: Captured by Nazi Germany in September 1943

Nazi Germany
- Acquired: September 1943
- Commissioned: 1944
- Out of service: 1945
- Fate: Returned to the Socialist Federal Republic of Yugoslavia

SFR Yugoslavia
- Commissioned: 1947
- Out of service: 1992
- Fate: Passed to FRY Navy

FR Yugoslavia/Serbia and Montenegro
- Commissioned: 1992
- Out of service: 2006
- Fate: Passed to Montenegrin Navy

Montenegro
- Owner: Montenegrin Navy
- Identification: MMSI number: 262999000; Callsign: 4OMA
- Status: In active service

General characteristics
- Type: Topsail schooner or Barquentine
- Displacement: 720 long tons (730 t)
- Length: 60 m (196 ft 10 in) (oa)
- Beam: 8.90 m (29 ft 2 in)
- Height: 39.1 m (128 ft 3 in)
- Draught: 4.05 m (13 ft 3 in)
- Speed: 14.5 knots (26.9 km/h; 16.7 mph) (sail alone); 8.5–9 kn (15.7–16.7 km/h; 9.8–10.4 mph) (engine alone)
- Range: 3,000 nautical miles (5,600 km; 3,500 mi) at 9 kn (17 km/h; 10 mph); 4,600 nmi (8,500 km; 5,300 mi) at 6 kn (11 km/h; 6.9 mph)
- Crew: 156

Jadran is a sailing ship for basic naval training built for the Yugoslav Royal Navy and currently in Montenegrin Navy service. A three-mast topsail schooner or barquentine with an auxiliary engine, Jadran was built in Hamburg, Germany between 1930 and 1933, and commissioned on 19 August 1933. Prior to World War II she completed seven long training cruises with trainees from the Yugoslav Naval Academy, including one to North America. As Yugoslavia was neutral at the outbreak of World War II, Jadran was able to conduct short cruises in the Adriatic Sea. In April 1941, Yugoslavia was invaded by the Axis powers, and Jadran was captured and renamed Marco Polo by the Italian Navy. She continued to be used as a training ship in the Adriatic, operating out of the Istrian port of Pola, and was featured in an Italian propaganda film.

During the Italian capitulation in September 1943 she was captured by the Germans while being refitted in Venice. Thereafter, the Germans utilised her as a stationary training ship and, in the final few months of the war, as a coal depot ship and floating bridge. Looted and dilapidated at the end of the war, she was returned to the new Socialist Federal Republic of Yugoslavia in 1946 and rebuilt as Jadran between 1947 and 1949. Between 1949 and 1991, training was mainly conducted in the Adriatic, and she undertook only five long-distance cruises. In 1984 she undertook her first long-distance cruise in two decades.

At the time that the Yugoslav Wars commenced in 1991, Jadran was undergoing a refit at Tivat in the Bay of Kotor, having been transferred from her home port of Split. During the wars she came under the control of rump Yugoslavia. The new state of Croatia requested her return, but this was refused. Her first cruise with the rump Yugoslav Navy was to Greece in 1997. In 2006, Montenegro became independent, and Jadran became a ship of the Montenegrin Navy. She sailed to the UK in 2005 for the 200th anniversary of the Battle of Trafalgar celebrations, and to Barcelona, Spain in 2008 for the World Conservation Congress.

Jadran's ownership remains disputed between Montenegro and Croatia. In December 2021, the two countries agreed to form an inter-governmental commission to resolve her future status.

== Background ==
When the Royal Navy of the Kingdom of Serbs, Croats and Slovenes (from 1929, the Royal Navy of Yugoslavia) was formed in 1921, it did not have a sailing ship for basic naval training. This was seen as necessary for trainee officers and non-commissioned officers (NCOs) to learn basic shipboard skills before more advanced training on warships. While under the 1919 Treaty of Saint-Germain-en-Laye it received some ships from the defeated Austro-Hungarian Navy of World War I, that navy had not possessed a sailing ship for training either. The only ship of this type in service with the Kingdom of Serbs, Croats and Slovenes was Vila Velebita, which belonged to the merchant fleet, and operated out of the Royal Nautical School at Bakar. While Vila Velebita could be shared by the navy, this arrangement was not suitable due to the limited time she was available and because she was too small for their purposes.

The Royal Yugoslav Army was allocated the vast majority of military funding, leaving the navy without sufficient funds to purchase a sufficiently large sailing training ship. Therefore, in 1925 the semi-official Yugoslav naval association, Jadranska straža (Adriatic Guard), launched an appeal for donations in order to purchase such a ship. However, between 1926 and around August 1930, only one million Yugoslav dinars had been raised of the eight million dinars needed. Despite the shortfall, the Ministry of the Army and Navy then allocated an initial sum of four million dinars for the planned sailing training ship. The remaining funds were to be obtained via loans and German World War I reparations to the Kingdom of Serbia, the territory of which was now part of the Kingdom of Yugoslavia.

== Design and construction ==
=== Design ===
Jadran was ordered on 4 September 1930 from the H. C. Stülcken Sohn shipyard in Hamburg, Germany, based on plans drawn up by the naval engineer Josip Škarica. The Stülcken shipyard had not built a steel sailing ship since 1902, but the navy had ordered four small tugs from it two years earlier and had been pleased with the vessels when they were delivered. The construction contract specified a price of 580,375 Reichsmarks, which was equivalent to 7,916,052 dinars at that time. She was designed with a clipper bow and counter stern.

Jadran was constructed of steel as a three-mast topsail schooner, although some sources describe her as a barquentine. She had a displacement of 720 long tons (730 t), a length overall of 60 m (196 ft 10 in), and waterline length of 41 m (134 ft 6 in). Her beam was 8.90 m (29 ft 2 in), her draught was 4 m (13 ft 1 in) forward and 4.2 m (13 ft 9 in) aft, with an average draught of 4.05 m (13 ft 3 in), and her hull depth ranged between 4.55 m (14 ft 11 in) and 6.43 m (21 ft 1 in). The hull and lower masts were built of Siemens-Martin steel, and there were three steel decks: upper, main, and between-deck. The weather decks were covered with Oregon pine planks. Steel transverse bulkheads divided the hull into compartments, intended to keep the ship afloat even if a compartment was entirely flooded. Both forward and aft collision bulkheads were part of the design. Due to the rough sea conditions in the Adriatic, her anchors and chains were made stronger than was usually required by Norddeutscher Lloyd. She carried 125 long tons (127 t) of ballast.

=== Sail plan and engines ===
The sail plan included a total of 12 sails:

- square sails on the foremast, consisting of a foresail, fore lower topsail and fore upper topsail;
- gaff sails on all three masts;
- gaff topsails on the mainmast and mizzen mast;
- no staysails between the foremast and mainmast; and
- jib sails between the bowsprit and foremast, consisting of a flying jib, outer jib, jib and fore staysail.

The total sail area was 800 m^{2} (8,600 sq ft), the main mast was 39.1 m (128 ft 3 in) high and the rigging was a total of 11 km (6.8 mi) long. With sails alone, Jadran could reach 14.5 knots (26.9 km/h; 16.7 mph). The ship had a Linke-Hoffmann-Busch 6-cylinder diesel engine for auxiliary propulsion which generated 380 bhp (280 kW) and under its power alone Jadran could achieve a top speed of 8.5–9 kn (15.7–16.7 km/h; 9.8–10.4 mph). With a full 24.5 t (24.1 long tons; 27.0 short tons) of fuel, the ship's range on the engine alone was 3,000 nautical miles (5,600 km; 3,500 mi) at 9 knots and 4,600 nmi (8,500 km; 5,300 mi) at 6 kn (11 km/h; 6.9 mph). Jadran had auxiliary generators for electricity and a steam boiler for heating the engine room and cabins. The exhaust for the auxiliary engine was hidden in the trunk of the mizzen mast, with the opening well above the bridge.

=== Accommodation, boats and armament ===
The accommodation for the training staff, crew and midshipmen trainees was on the main deck as well as in a deckhouse located between the poop deck and forecastle, covered by the upper deck. The normal crew for non-training voyages was 12 officers, 36 NCOs and 108 sailors. On training voyages, 12 officers, 20 cadets of the Naval Military Academy, 50 cadets from NCO schools, 30 NCOs and 32 sailors was the usual complement. There were cabins for the 12 officers and one guest cabin, with the remaining crew sleeping in hammocks. Only the first and second classes at the Naval Academy trained aboard Jadran, with third class joining warships for training. There were separate messes for officers, trainees, NCOs and sailors. Other spaces included storage holds, washing and changing areas, toilets, offices, two galleys, a bakery, laundry, infirmary and attached sick room, and a brig.

Jadran was initially equipped with seven or eight ship's boats: three cutters, one of which was equipped as a lifeboat, and a second as a motorboat; two yawls; two dinghies; and a ceremonial gig. Most of the boats were hung on davits outboard, and were only brought on deck to secure them in poor weather. The ship held four outboard engines for use with the ship's boats. Her armament consisted to two 47 mm (1.9 in) L/33 saluting guns and two obsolescent 7.9 mm (0.31 in) Schwarzlose machine guns of World War I vintage, with 56 rifles for the crew. She was fitted with an electrical fire alarm and semi-automatic foam fire suppression systems.

=== Construction ===
The ship was given the shipyard number 669, and her keel was laid in the third quarter of 1930. Work proceeded apace, and she was launched on 25 June 1931, witnessed by the vice-president of Jadranska straža, Vice-Admiral Nikola Stanković, and was christened Jadran, the Serbo-Croatian word for the Adriatic Sea. Financial issues arising from the Great Depression then impacted the construction, exacerbated by the fall in the value of the German Reichsmark, and the Hoover Moratorium, which released Germany from its obligations to pay World War I reparations owed to Yugoslavia.

Ninety percent completed in 1932, work was stopped until the financial situation could be addressed. A compromise was eventually reached which apparently involved the owner of the shipyard reducing the price. After building resumed, Jadran was completed and ready for sea trials on 15 June 1933. The final cost was 622,743 Reichsmarks or 8,407,030 dinars. Norddeutscher Lloyd rated her "first class for long voyage". Jadran's hull was painted white overall, with a green bottom and blue waterline. All masts, yards, gaffs, the bowsprit and the mizzen boom were painted buff.

=== Voyage to Yugoslavia ===
Once ready, Jadran put to sea with a German merchant crew. On 15 June she accidentally collided with a British merchant ship in fog near Borkum Reef (off Borkum) in the North Sea, and returned to Hamburg under her own power for repairs, which took until 26 June. At 08:00 the following day, she was towed via the River Elbe to the sea, this time with a Yugoslav naval crew under Commander Nikola Krizomali. At 16:30 she was ready to set sail for Yugoslavia, but remained anchored near the light ship Elbe III due to stormy weather. Jadran finally commenced her journey at 10:30 on 29 June, and by 4 July was passing the Portuguese coast. Near Cape Finisterre on the Spanish coast, a wreath was placed in memory of all hands of SS Daksa, a Yugoslav merchant ship which had been lost there on 26 January 1930. On 6 July, Jadran reached Gibraltar and the first radio messages from Yugoslavia were received. The weather improved once she was in the Mediterranean, and she docked at Tunis in the French protectorate of Tunisia on 10 July to replenish. On 15 July, the ship passed through the Strait of Otranto into the Adriatic, and the following day reached the Bay of Kotor, where she was met at Tivat with celebrations. In attendance were the commanding officer of the Maritime Coastal Defence Sector, Rear Admiral Marijan Polić, the commanding officer of the Tivat Arsenal, Captain Rikard Kubin, and the mayor of Tivat. Her 3,114 nmi (5,767 km; 3,584 mi) voyage to Yugoslavia had been completed in 17 sailing days, at an average speed of 7.5 kn (13.9 km/h; 8.6 mph).

Krizomali remained the captain of the ship, and she was commissioned into the navy on 19 August. Despite the fact that the donation by Jadranska straža only amounted to one-sixth of her total cost, for political reasons the fiction was maintained that Jadran was donated by them, and on 6 September, Crown Prince Peter's birthday, she was officially "donated" to the navy at Split. The event was attended by: the president of Jadranska straža, Dr Ivo Tartaglia, and many members of the association; Stanković, who was now the commander-in-chief of the navy; and several government ministers or their deputies, along with nearly all of the ships of the fleet. Celebrations, which occurred over three days, included Serbian Orthodox and Catholic services and an open-air concert. Festivities also occurred at Omiš and on the nearby island of Hvar. As a whole, the three days were promoted as the "Adriatic Days", and drew the ire of the Italians, as Jadranska straža referred to the Adriatic as "our sea".

== Service history ==
=== Interwar period ===
After commissioning, Jadran was based at Split, but was allocated to the Yugoslav Naval Academy at Gruž, the main port of Dubrovnik. She soon commenced a series of short training cruises along the Yugoslav coast between the northern Adriatic island of Susak and the port of Ulcinj in the south, to ensure that the trainees experienced the full range of weather conditions. Jadran then proceeded on seven long training cruises between 1933 and 1939. In 1934 she conducted two cruises. The first cruise was between 25 June and 25 July, from Dubrovnik to Tunis, then to the British Crown Colony of Malta and Piraeus in Greece, returning to Tivat. The second longer cruise of that year ran from 5 August to 5 October and visited Gibraltar, Lisbon in Portugal, Rabat and Casablanca in French Morocco, stopping in Málaga and Palma de Mallorca in Spain on the way home. In 1935 there was one cruise from 1 June to 31 August, from Dubrovnik to Oran in French Algeria, then on to São Vicente, Cape Verde and Madeira, both Portuguese possessions in the Atlantic Ocean, followed by Cádiz in Spain, Ajaccio on the French island of Corsica, and Piraeus, before returning home.

In early 1936, Jadran underwent a two-month refit at Tivat in preparation for her training cruise that year. From 10 June to 31 August, she conducted a training cruise to Malta, Villafranca Tirrena on the north-eastern tip of Sicily, Heraklion on the Greek island of Crete, Beirut in French Lebanon, Marmaris on the south-western coast of Turkey, through the Dardanelles to Istanbul, then through the Bosporus to the Romanian port of Constanța and the Bulgarian port of Varna, both on the Black Sea coast, before returning via Salonika and Piraeus in Greece. The following year, it was intended to undertake an ambitious eight-month-long cruise to South America, but this was reduced to a cruise which again visited the eastern Mediterranean and the Black Sea. Leaving Gruž on 1 June under Commander Mate Marušič, the cruise included calls at Malta, Naples in Italy, and Alexandria and Port Said in Egypt, before transiting the Suez Canal to Suez and back to the Mediterranean. This was followed by visits to Tripoli in Lebanon, the Greek island of Samos, then again through the Dardanelles to Istanbul and via the Bosporus to the Black Sea, where the Romanian ports of Sulina and Constanța were visited, along with the Bulgarian port of Burgas. Returning to the Mediterranean, Jadran then anchored off the Athos Peninsula before passing through the narrow Corinth Canal to visit Patras before returning to Yugoslavia.

In 1938, the cancelled long-distance cruise was undertaken, but to North America instead. Under Commander Jerko Kačić-Dimitri, Jadran first collected trainees from the petty officers' school at Šibenik before departing Gruž on 20 April. This cruise went via Malta, Gibraltar, and Funchal on Madeira, before crossing the Atlantic to visit Hamilton, Bermuda on 14 June, and New York on 21 June for a sixteen-day visit. During her time in New York, Jadran was visited by thousands of expatriate Yugoslavs including members of US branches of Jadranska straža. A delegation of the crew visited the inventor Nikola Tesla, who was born in Smiljan (formerly part of the Austrian Empire, but part of Yugoslavia in 1938) and gifted him a bas-relief of the ship. A five-day visit to Boston from 10 July followed, then the return journey to Yugoslavia via Santa Cruz das Flores in the Azores (26 July), Gibraltar (11–15 August), and the French protectorate of Tunisia (21–25 August), arriving in Dubrovnik on 31 August. The voyage was the longest made by Jadran in the pre-war period, a total of 11,262 nmi (20,857 km; 12,960 mi).

=== World War II ===
On 22 May 1939, Jadran commenced a two-month training cruise to northern Europe with students from Šibenik and Gruž. She visited Malta, Lisbon, Cherbourg and Le Havre in France, Rotterdam in the Netherlands, Hamburg and Kiel in Germany, and Gdynia in Poland. On the return leg, Jadran visited Stockholm in Sweden, Copenhagen in Denmark, and Oslo in Norway, before arriving in Portsmouth in the UK on 15 August. Following four days' shore leave, the ship left for home. Due to the threat of war at the time, foreign naval vessels were banned from French ports, which meant that Jadran was unable to resupply in Algiers as planned, and was ordered to return home without resupply en route. Even though she was heavily loaded with provisions in the UK, rationing was soon imposed, and the crew ran out of meat and fresh vegetables well before she arrived home on 5 September. Four days earlier, Germany had invaded Poland, resulting in the outbreak of World War II.

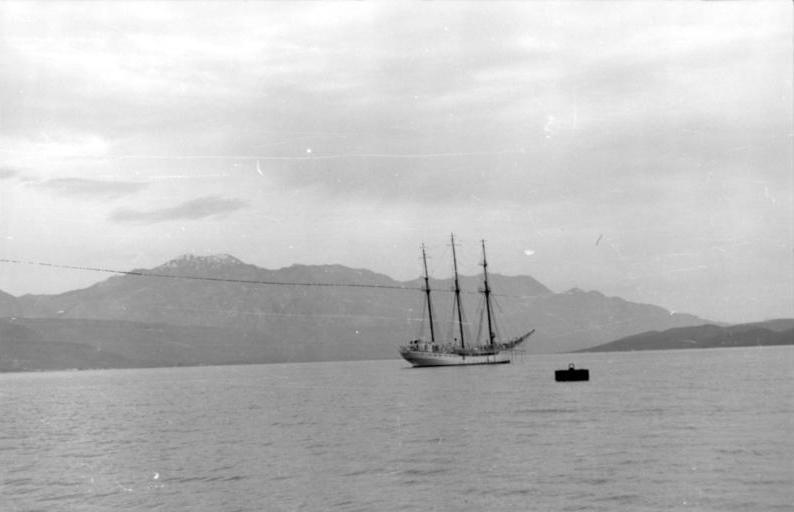
Jadran in the Bay of Kotor after the Axis invasion of Yugoslavia

From its outbreak, Yugoslavia maintained a neutral position towards the war, so in 1940 and 1941 short training cruises could be conducted, but only within the Adriatic, mainly between Dubrovnik and Šibenik. Her last training voyage was undertaken between 1 December 1940 and 28 February 1941. On 27 March 1941, with Yugoslavia likely to be invaded by the Axis powers, Jadran was sent to Tivat. Once hostilities broke out, she was to be tasked with transporting troops and supplies between bases within the Bay of Kotor. When the Axis invasion began on 6 April, the ship was anchored off Đenovići within the Bay of Kotor under the command of Captain Anton Vekarić. On full mobilisation, Jadran's crew was to number 8 officers, 36 petty officers and 108 sailors, but at this time she had only six officers and 80 ratings aboard. Due to Jadran's unreliable machine guns, her crew were ordered to engage enemy aircraft with rifles. However, during the invasion, despite Italian air attacks on the Bay of Kotor, Jadran was not targeted.

The invasion ended after eleven days with the Yugoslav capitulation, and Jadran was captured by the Italians, along with most of the fleet. She was renamed Marco Polo, and transferred to the port of Pola in Istria, where she joined the two existing Italian sailing training ships Amerigo Vespucci and Cristoforo Colombo, as well as Vila Velebita, which was renamed Palinuro. Marco Polo conducted training cruises for the Regia Marina (Italian Royal Navy) until the Italians capitulated in September 1943. Apparently she was preferred by the Italians over their existing sailing training ships because she was easier to sail in the Adriatic. During her service as Marco Polo she featured prominently in an Italian naval propaganda film, Come Si Diventa Marinai (How to Become a Sailor) by Istituto Luce. At the time of the Italian capitulation, she was in Venice being repaired and refitted, and was captured there by the Germans on 12 September. On 28 February 1944, the Germans recommissioned her in Venice as a stationary training ship, and in the final few months of the war she was utilised as a coal depot ship and floating bridge. At the end of the war, she was located abandoned in a backwater, stripped and looted of almost everything of value.

=== Return to Yugoslav service ===
At the request of the post-war communist Yugoslav government, the ship was returned to their control in 1946, and was initially towed from Venice to Šibenik in December, then on to Tivat by the Yugoslav salvage ship Spasilac. Her hull was in a terrible state, with many hull plates rusting, and her deck planking removed, burned or rotten. Her sails, some rigging, instruments and engines were all missing, and her topmasts, gaffs and yards were rotten. Everything else that was flammable had been burned. Due to the poor economic situation in post-war Yugoslavia, it was determined that she would be rebuilt with local expertise and materials. The work was undertaken at the naval dockyard at Tivat and at the Jadranska brodogradilišta shipyard at Split. The dockyard and shipyard workers were assisted and advised by a hand-picked crew made up mainly of former members of the wartime Partisan Navy from all of the constituent republics of the country, led by Commander Ljubo Mihovilović, the ship's provisional commanding officer. Repairs began on 21 April 1947, and were extensive. New topmasts and gaffs were installed and rigged, a 380 bhp (280 kW) Fiat diesel engine, new shaft tunnel and propeller, new auxiliary engines, water and drainage plumbing, electrical cabling and instruments were installed, the pine deck planking was replaced, and the complement of boats reduced to two yawls, two dinghies and one gig. The overhaul and major repairs were completed on 17 December 1948.

After spare parts were made and additional equipment had been added, in mid-1949 she was allocated – once again named Jadran – to a new home port of Divulje near Split, which had become the site of the Yugoslav Naval Academy in 1947. Commander Ivan Ivanović was appointed as her commanding officer, with Mihovilović as his deputy. Due to Ivanović's training responsibilities at the academy, Jadran often sailed under Mihovilović's command. During the years she was being rebuilt, the Yugoslav Navy had utilised a smaller two-masted schooner, also dubbed Jadran, as its sailing training ship. On 29 October 1951, her bow was damaged when she was docking at Biograd na Moru in northern Dalmatia. In 1953, a slightly larger half-sister ship was completed by the Stülcken yard, the Indonesian Navy training sailing ship KRI Dewaruci, which is classed as a barquentine.

Post-war training cruises were mostly conducted in the Adriatic; between 1949 and 1991, only five long-distance cruises were undertaken. Periodic refits and repairs were conducted at Tivat as needed. From October to November 1953, a one-month training cruise was conducted between Ulcinj and Koper in Istria, and in 1954–55, about 10 one-month or shorter training cruises were carried out between Ulcinj and Koper with officer and NCO trainees. Between 27 March and 26 November 1956, a complete overhaul of Jadran was conducted. This involved removing, cleaning and replacing the ballast, renewing the pine deck planking, and replacing several hull plates and frames, and the kitchen funnel was redirected into a funnel within the main mast in a similar manner as the engine exhaust was ported through the mizzen mast. The lower row of portholes was also removed, which provides a useful visual means of determining when a photograph of the ship was taken. The first post-war long-distance training cruise was conducted in 1959, as such cruises by trainees at the academy were mostly undertaken by the Galeb, which also served as President Josip Broz Tito's yacht. In 1966, a short film was shot aboard Jadran.

On 1 November 1967, Jadran began a major overhaul. Twenty-three hull plates were replaced, along with seven upper deck plates and four lower deck plates, and 37 percent of the inner frame. The bridge was rebuilt, and the pine deck planking was replaced with teak. Her ballast was increased to 179.5 long tons (182.4 t). Her foremast was 37.3 m (122 ft 5 in) high, her main mast remained at 39.1 m high, and her mizzen mast was 35.8 m (117 ft 5 in) high. New sail sets were ordered in linen and synthetic fibre, and her total sail area increased to 933 m^{2} (10,040 sq ft). Her Fiat engine was replaced by a Burmeister & Wain Alpha engine, produced under license by Litostroj of Ljubljana, generating 500 bhp (373 kW), and under its power alone the ship could sail at a maximum speed of 10.4 kn (19.3 km/h; 12.0 mph), although this later reduced to 9.5 kn (17.6 km/h; 10.9 mph). A total of 26.95 tonnes (29.71 tons) of fuel meant that the ship's range on the engine alone increased to 4,730 nmi (8,760 km; 5,440 mi) at 7 kn (13 km/h; 8.1 mph). Her displacement also increased to 776.5 t (855.9 tons). Crew accommodation was improved, including the installation of bunks to replace the hammocks, the replacement of the wooden ship's boats with fibreglass ones, and the replacement of almost all equipment, including auxiliary power generation, cabling, kitchen, communications and navigation instruments. A Decca RM-1226 radar was installed. With 48 long tons (49 t) of water and a hold full of supplies, the ship could sail for two weeks without reprovisioning. The overhaul concluded on 30 July 1969, and sea trials concluded that she had improved stability.

In 1971, Jadran undertook four training cruises with students from various schools between June and August 1971. From 1 September 1972, Jadran was based at Lora naval base near Split, where naval training had been concentrated as the School Centre of the Navy, and later as the Marshal Tito Naval School Centre from 1982. She was used as a floating classroom throughout the year, with new classes of midshipmen embarked in autumn each year to test their "sea legs" before their training commenced. Short cruises were conducted in spring and autumn/winter of each year, and in summer a longer cruise of one-month duration was conducted with more senior trainees. Jadran visited ports right along the Adriatic coast, promoting the navy. For example, Jadran undertook two training cruises in late 1972 and a further two in 1974, and nine cruises in the first half of 1975. In 1976 the Plave vrpce Vjesnika (Blue Ribbon of Vjesnik) award ceremony for bravery at sea was held aboard Jadran. The same year, she sailed over 5,000 nmi (9,300 km; 5,800 mi). Due to the constant training and periodic refits, the standing crew received less and less training, but all officers and men of the navy spent at least some time aboard her during their naval education. In 1983, the ship celebrated the 50th anniversary of her commissioning, and the following year she undertook her first Mediterranean cruise in two decades when she visited mainland Greece and the Greek island of Corfu in the Ionian Sea. Throughout her second stint in Yugoslav service, Jadran's crew shrunk. Immediately after returning to service following World War II, she had a crew of 80 and could embark 150 trainees, but later her crew was as low as 20, with a total of 100 on board. Jadran was awarded the Order of Merits for the People with Golden Star.

=== FR Yugoslavia and Montenegro ===
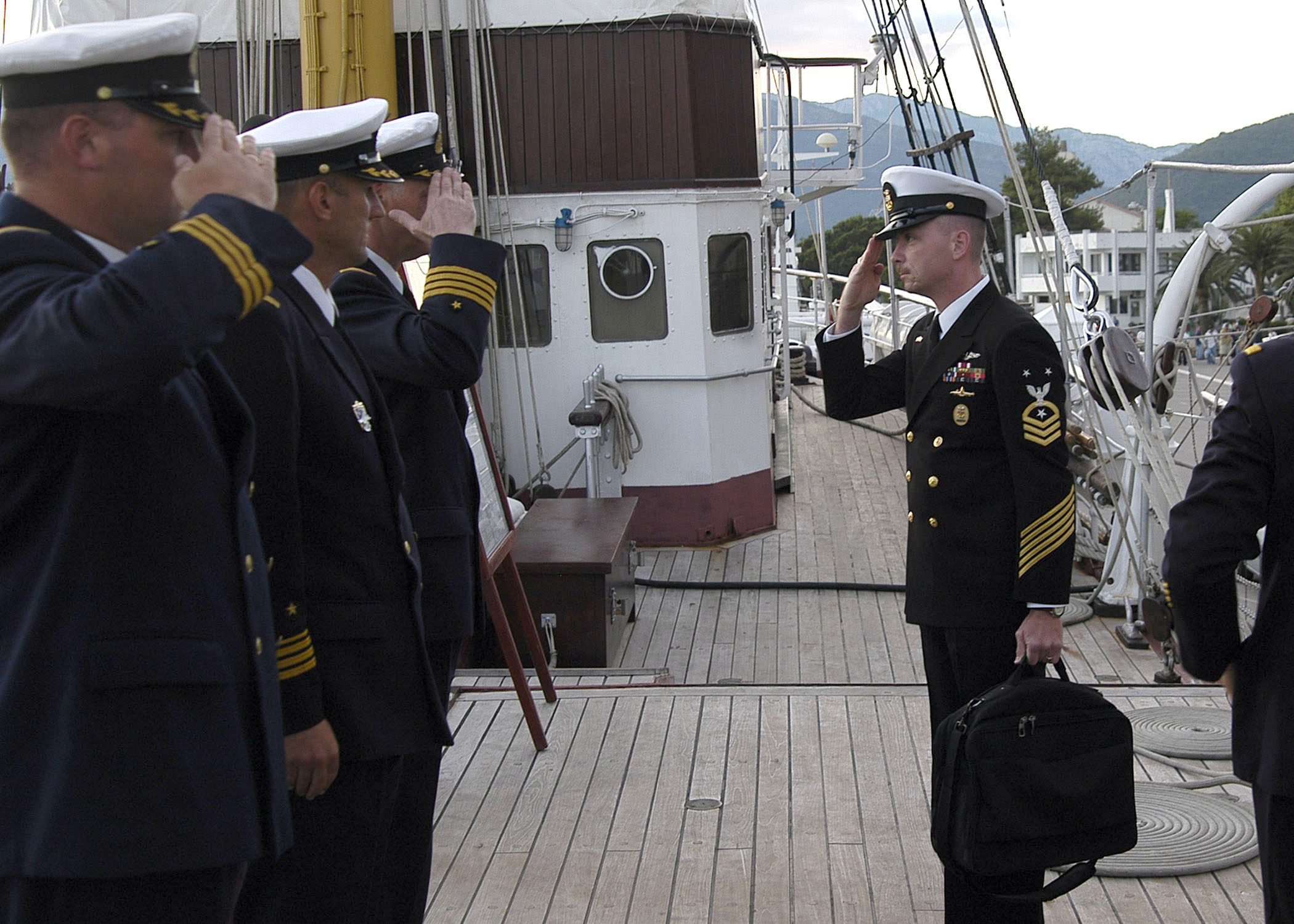
Command Master Chief Petty Officer Richard Dodd of USS Emory S. Land salutes as he is rung aboard Jadran before a cocktail reception during a goodwill visit to Montenegro in 2007.

At the time when the wars in Yugoslavia began in 1991, Jadran had been sent from her home port of Split to the Sava Kovačević Naval Shipyard in Tivat for a refit. She took no part in any of the wars, which resulted in the breakup of Yugoslavia in 1992. After the wars concluded, the new country of Croatia sought Jadran's return from FR Yugoslavia, which consisted of only the former Yugoslav republics of Serbia and Montenegro, Tivat being in the territory of the latter. This request was refused. The ship undertook its first training cruise to Greece with the FR Yugoslav Navy in 1997. During her final overhaul in Yugoslav service – costing €800,000 – Jadran was fitted with Furuno FR 2120 and FR 7061 radar. To mark her 70th anniversary in 2003, celebrations were held in August rather than September, in order to dissociate her from the late King Peter II of Yugoslavia, on whose birthday she had been officially "donated" to the Yugoslav navy. In 2004, the ship was available for rent from the navy of Serbia and Montenegro – which were then in a state union – for cruising or filming at a rate of €1,800 per day. The following year, Jadran represented the state union at the 200th anniversary of the Battle of Trafalgar celebrations in Portsmouth, sailing through heavy weather in the Bay of Biscay en route. This was the last time that Jadran undertook a long voyage under the flag of the state union.

In the summer of 2006, Montenegro became an independent state, and ships that had served in the state union became the property of the new country. Jadran sailed to Barcelona in 2008 as part of an event organized by the International Union for Conservation of Nature for the 2008 World Conservation Congress. It sailed with 20 other sailing vessels, ranging from schooners to catamarans, and two research vessels, leaving Kotor on 24 September and arriving in Barcelona on 10 October. She then led a contingent of sailing vessels to the congress site on 12 October. The ship sailed with her usual sailing crew of 34 plus trainees and conservationists. This was the first time that the ship had carried civilian passengers. She was valued at approximately US$8,000,000 in 2008. In 2009, she was in good shape, and there were plans to offer sailing training to trainees from neighboring countries. In 2013, the Montenegrin government funded another overhaul of Jadran.

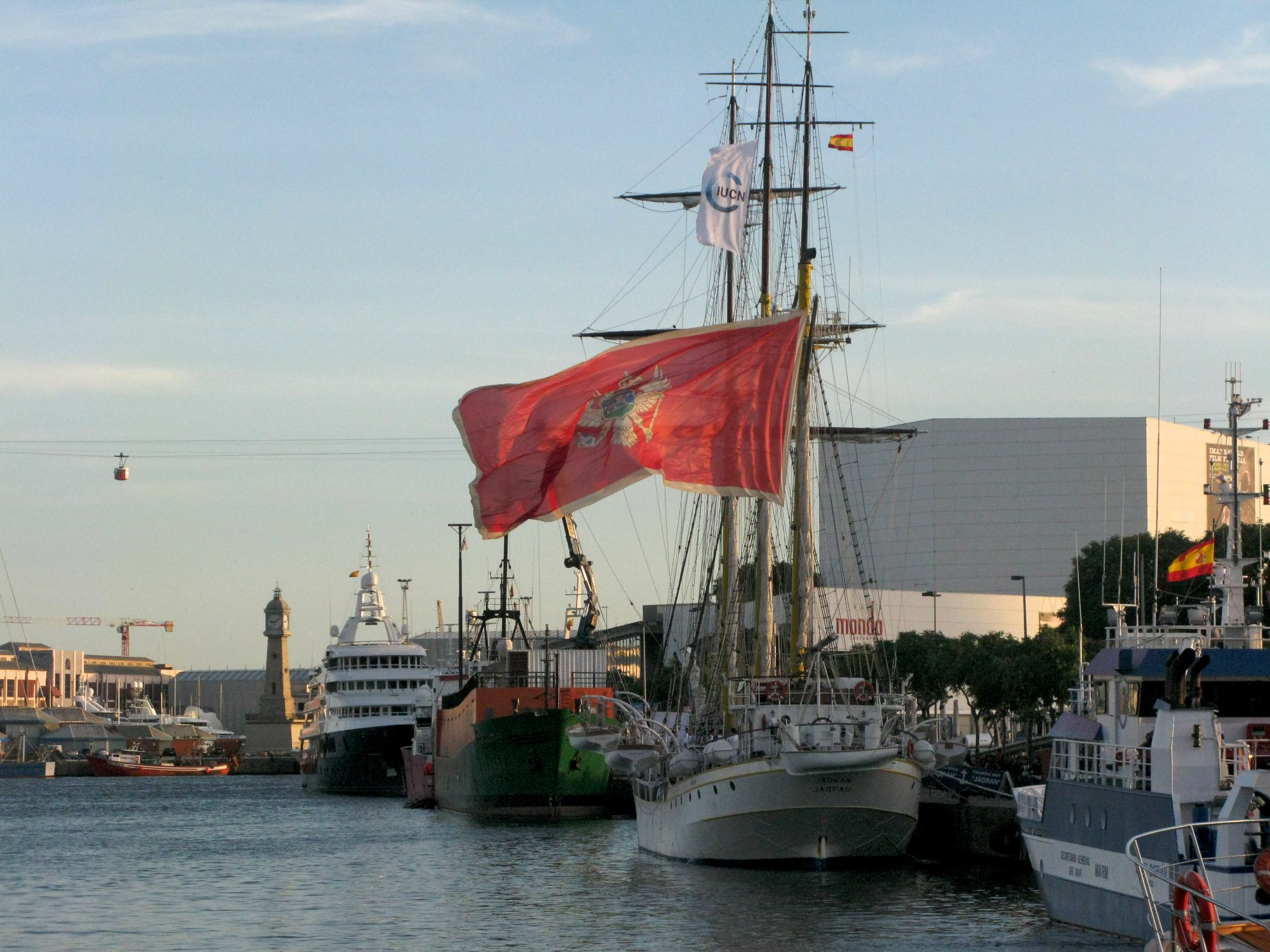
Jadran (flying the red Montenegrin flag) at Barcelona during the 2008 World Conservation Congress

In December 2017, it was reported that Croatia and Montenegro were close to solving their dispute over the ownership of Jadran, with moves to share the use of the ship, but in September of the following year diplomatic relations between the two countries were said to be in peril over the issue, with Croatia threatening to block Montenegro's bid to join the European Union over the disagreement. The previous month, the Croatian singer Vanna, who had been booked to perform on the ship as part of a celebration of the 85th anniversary of Jadran, cancelled her appearance due to pressure from Croatia. In May 2018, Jadran visited Malta during a cruise. In September, the Serbian newspaper Danas reported that Jadran was the only open issue of difficulty between Croatia and Montenegro, and that Croatia claims the ship because it was based in Croatia prior to the Yugoslav Wars.

On 19 April 2019, Montenegrin military police seized around 50 kg (110 lb) of cocaine on the ship, just before its scheduled Tivat-Istanbul-Piraeus voyage. Three days later, Duško Radenović, a midshipman of the Montenegrin Navy, was arrested for drug smuggling. In December 2021, the Montenegrin government announced that it had agreed with Croatia to form an inter-governmental commission to resolve the ship's future status. In the statement, Montenegrin prime minister Zdravko Krivokapić stated that relations between the two countries were "friendly" on the whole, and that since Montenegrin independence, Croatia had continually supported Montenegro's process of European integration.

Returning the Jadran to Croatia is one of the terms Croatia outlined as necessary to lift their block on Montenegro's ascension to the European Union in September 2026.
