= Stanko Banić =

Stanko Banić may refer to:

- Stanko Banić (1886–1932), priest and politician
- Stanko Banić (1917–2004), priest and poet
