= Jure Bogdan =

Croatian bishop

- Military ordinary
- Archdiocese: Military Ordinariate of Croatia
- See: Zagreb
- Appointed: 30 November 2015
- Installed: 27 February 2016
- Predecessor: Juraj Jezerinac
- Other post: Rector of Pontifical Croatian College of St. Jerome (1997-2016)

Orders
- Ordination: 22 June 1980 by Frane Franić
- Consecration: 27 February 2016 by Josip Bozanić

Personal details
- Born: Jure Bogdan; 9 November 1955 (age 70) Donji Dolac, PR Croatia, FPR Yugoslavia (modern Croatia)
- Denomination: Roman Catholic
- Education: University of Split; Pontifical Lateran University
- Motto: Sve na veću slavu Božju; Everything to the greater glory of God
- Coat of arms

Jure Bogdan (born in Donji Dolac near Omiš, 9 November 1955) is a Croatian bishop who serves as 2nd Military ordinary of Croatia since 27 February 2016, had previously served as a rector of Pontifical Croatian College of St. Jerome.

== Early life and education ==
Jure Bogdan was born in a small village of Donji Dolac near Omiš on 9 November 1955 to Ivan and Perka Bogdan. He attended elementary school in Donji Dolac from 1961 to 1969, after which he attended minor seminary in Split during which he finished Classical gymnasium in the year 1973. After graduation, he enrolled in the Catholic Theological Faculty of the University of Split from which he graduated theology and philosophy on 16 May 1980. During his studies, Bogdan served as a senior prefect of Split archdiocesan seminary from January 1977 to autumn 1979. Bogdan was ordained as a deacon for Archdiocese of Split-Makarska by Archbishop Frane Franić in Split cathedral on 24 June 1979. Archbishop Franić ordained him for priest on 22 June 1980.

== Career ==
Bogdan celebrated his first Mass in Donji Dolac on 6 July 1980. After that, he served as a parish vicar in the parish of St. Nicholas in Metković from 15 August 1980 to 15 August 1984. From August 1984 to September 1992, he was a spiritual leader at the Split archdiocesan seminary. Bogdan was also Vice President of Council for Youth, and the presiding judge for vocations in his Archdiocese. He also served as a secretary of Council for seminaries of the Bishops' Conference of Yugoslavia.

In autumn of 1992, Bogdan was sent by Archbishop Ante Jurić to attend study of pastoral theology at the Pontifical Lateran University in Rome. He gained his master's degree in October 1994 with the mentorship of Bishop Marcello Semeraro, after which he gained his Ph.D. on 22 June 1999. with thesis "Vita Universale: Cristianesimo delle origini o nuova rivelazione? Riflessioni teologico-pastorali" (Universal Life: Originally Christianity or new revelation? Theological-pastoral reflection). His mentor was prof. Michael Fuss.

At the proposal of the Croatian bishops, Prefect of the Congregation for Catholic Education, Cardinal Pio Laghi appointed Bogdan on 2 December 1996 to the position of rector of the Pontifical Croatian College of St. Jerome. The appointment was announced on 19 December 1996, while Bogdan took office on 25 January 1997. In addition, Cardinal Camillo Ruini appointed Bogdan as a rector of Saint Jerome of the Croats church. Besides this, Bogdan served two terms, both, as a secretary, and president of the Association of the Rectors of the Roman Pontifical Institutes (Associazione dei Rettori dei College ecclesiastic di Roma). He spent 19 years as a rector under three Popes, John Paul II, Pope Benedict XVI and Francis. Bogdan is the postulator of Blessed Miroslav Bulešić.

Pope Francis has named Bogdan new bishop and Military Ordinary of Croatia on 30 November 2015. He was consecrated on 27 February 2016 by archbishop Marin Barišić, with co-consecrators being cardinal Josip Bozanić, and bishop Juraj Jezerinac, his predecessor.

== Bibliography ==
Bogdan is the author of several scientific articles. He also edited several books including the collection of works about Institute of St. Jerome that was published on the occasion of the celebration of the centennial of the modern Institute of St. Jerome (1901-2001).
