= Military Ordinariate of Croatia =

Latin Catholic jurisdiction in Croatia

Coordinates: 45°50′16″N 15°58′40″E

Military Ordinariate of Croatia Vojni ordinarijat u Republici Hrvatskoj

Catholic
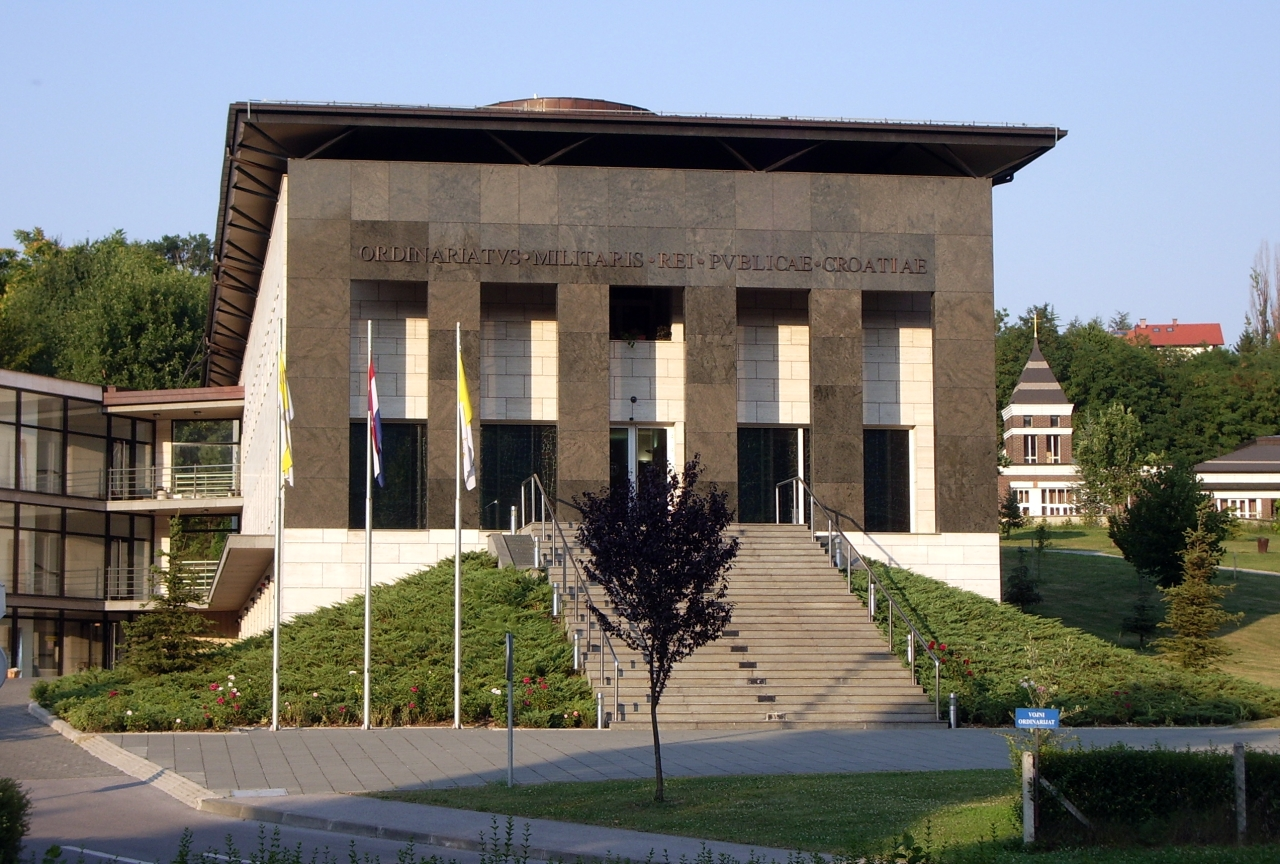
- Military Ordinariate building in Zagreb

Location
- Country: Croatia

Information
- Denomination: Catholic Church
- Sui iuris church: Latin Church
- Rite: Roman Rite
- Established: 25 April 1997 (29 years ago)

Current leadership
- Pope: Leo XIV
- Bishop: Jure Bogdan
- Bishops emeritus: Juraj Jezerinac

Website
- www.vojni-ordinarijat.hr

The Military Ordinariate of Croatia (Croatian: Vojni ordinarijat u Republici Hrvatskoj) is a military ordinariate of the Catholic Church. Immediately subject to the Holy See, it provides pastoral care to Roman Catholics serving in the Croatian Armed Forces and their families.

== History ==
The military ordinariate was established by Pope John Paul II on 25 April 1997.

== Military ordinaries ==
No.	Portrait	Name (Birth–Death)	Start	End	Duration
1		Juraj Jezerinac (1939–)	25 April 1997	27 February 2016	18 years, 308 days
2		Jure Bogdan (1955–)	27 February 2016	Present	10 years, 230 days

== See also ==
- Catholic Church in Croatia
- List of Catholic dioceses in Croatia
