= Otokar Lahman =

Croatian writer and demographer (1899 – 1977)

- Born: 20 June 1899; Makarska, Kingdom of Dalmatia, Austria-Hungary, (now Croatia)
- Died: 18 August 1977 (aged 78); Rogač, SR Croatia, Yugoslavia, (now Croatia)
- Education: Faculty of Science, University of Zagreb
- Occupations: Literary critic, writer, demographer

Otokar Lahman (20 June 1899 in Makarska – 18 August 1928 in Rogač) was a Croatian magazine editor, literary critic and demographer.

Lahman was the financial secretary and a member of the editing board of the Jadranska straža journal published by the Jadranska straža organisation in Split from 1922 to 1941. Following the Invasion of Yugoslavia during Second World War and subsequent establishment of the Axis puppet state of the Independent State of Croatia (NDH), Lahman was employed as the head of accounting of the NDH's Ministry of People's Education. After the war, Lahman graduated from the Faculty of Science, University of Zagreb in 1949. In 1948–1950, Lahman was the secretary of the Yugoslav Academy of Sciences and Arts and then a clerk in the Presidency of the Government of the People's Republic of Croatia and the State Investment Bank of Yugoslavia.

In 1920s and 1930s, Lahman published literary reviews and various articles exploring maritime issues. He published a number of papers exploring the topics of demography from 1949 until the 1970s.
