= Miroslav Bulešić =

Croatian Catholic priest (1920–1947)

Blessed Miroslav Bulešić
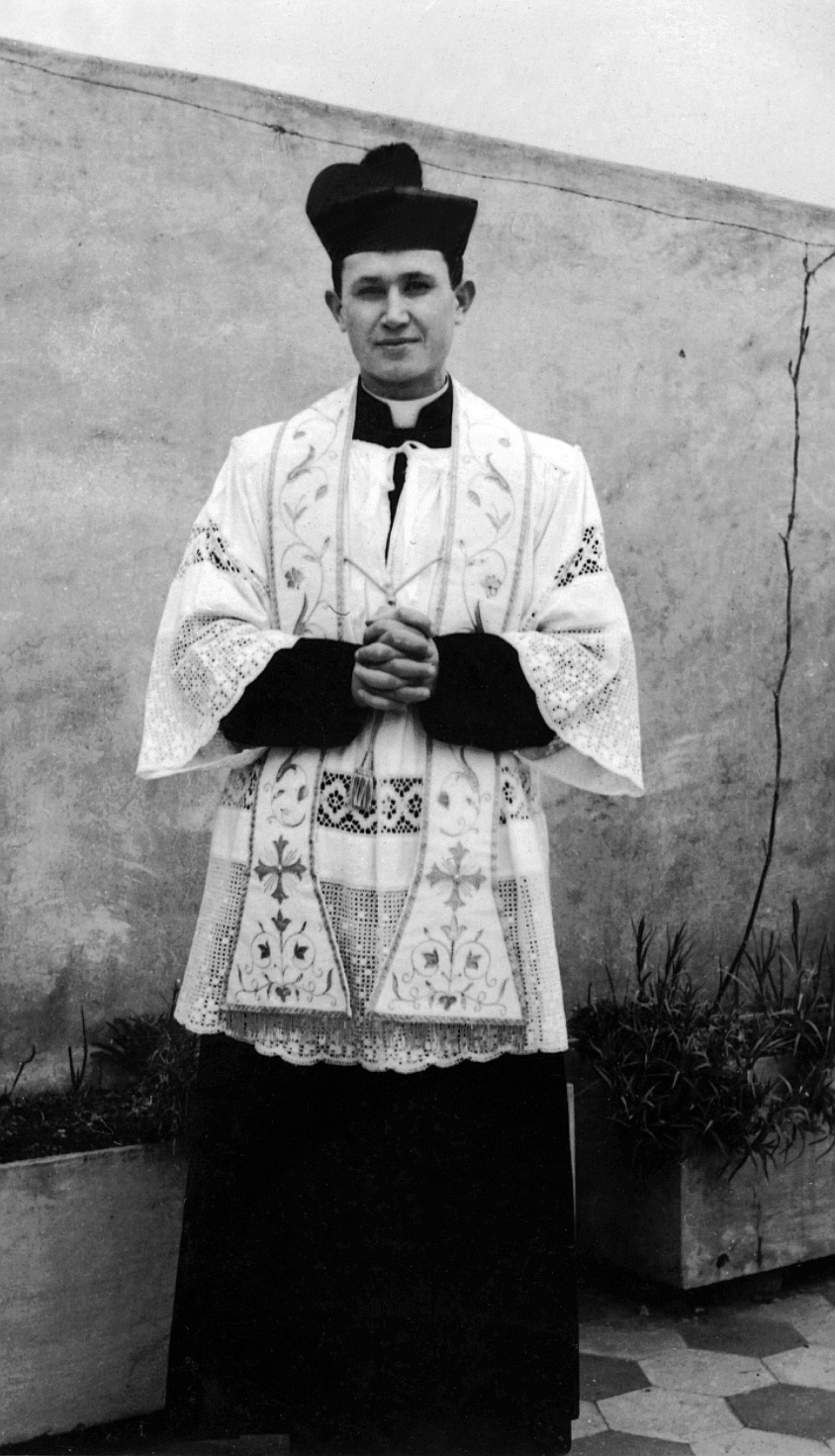

Personal details
- Born: 13 May 1920 Zabroni near Sanvincenti, Kingdom of Italy
- Died: 24 August 1947 (aged 27) Lanišće, PR Croatia, FPR Yugoslavia

Sainthood
- Feast day: 24 August
- Venerated in: Roman Catholic Church
- Title as Saint: Martyr
- Beatified: 28 September 2013; Pula Arena, Pula, Croatia by Cardinal Angelo Amato
- Shrines: Svetvinčenat, Croatia

Miroslav Bulešić (13 May 1920 – 24 August 1947) was a Croatian Catholic priest. He studied in Rome before being recalled to his native Istria where he was ordained in 1943 during World War II prior to two parish postings where he became a vocal critic of communism. He renewed his parishes through well-organized pastoral activities and was a promoter of frequent sacramental reception. But his criticism of communism saw him make enemies who soon killed him.

He was beatified in Pula, Croatia on 28 September 2013 on the recognition of the fact that he was killed in odium fidei ("in hatred of the faith"); Cardinal Angelo Amato presided over the beatification on the behalf of Pope Francis.

== Life ==
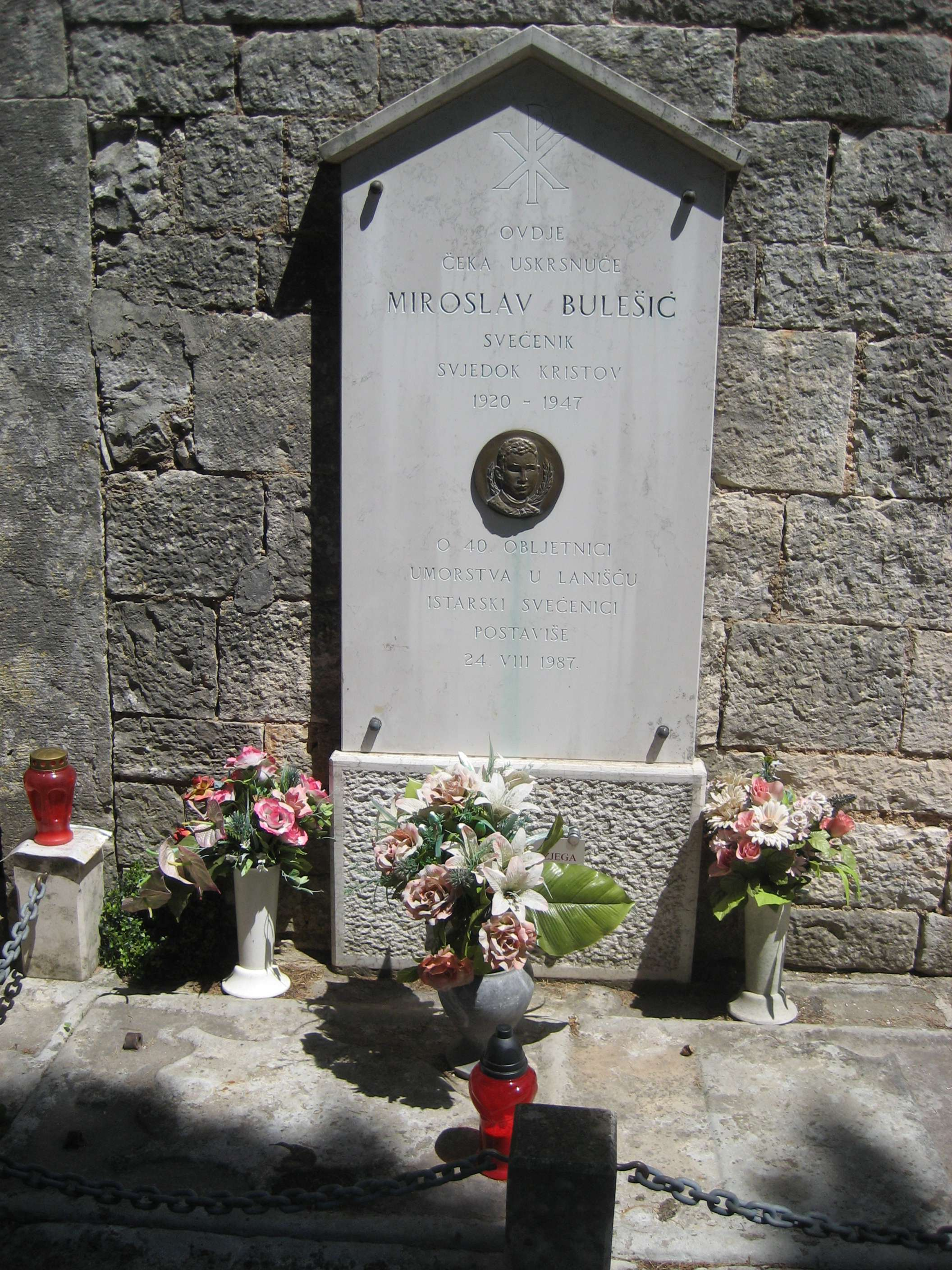
Tomb from 1958 to 2003.

Miroslav Bulešić was born on 13 May 1920 in Zabroni (Čabrunići) – a village in Istria, at that time in the Kingdom of Italy. He was born to father Miha Bulešić and mother Lucija Butković. His siblings were sisters Maria, Lucija and Zora and brother Beppo. He received his baptism on 23 May 1920 in the parish church at Roveria (Juršići). In his childhood he first learned the truths of the faith from a small book that Bishop Juraj Dobrila had written and the book focused on the spiritual needs of the Croatian faithful.

His initial education was spent in Roveria where his religious education teacher was the priest Ivan Pavić. In 1930, he decided to commence his studies for the priesthood and after a brief stint at the Salesian Collegio San Luigi in Gorizia (Gorica) commenced his ecclesial studies at Capodistria (Koper) in 1931. He was there until 1939 after he did grammar school from 1931 to 1936 and then his lyceum until 1939 when he passed his final examinations. Pavić sent him a letter of recommendation and said that he was a "wise, frank, pious and good" seminarian. In the fall of 1939 the Bishop of Parenzo-Pola (Poreč-Pula) Trifone Pederzolli sent him to Rome for further studies.

He studied at the Gregoriana for his philosophical and theological studies from the fall of 1939 until the summer of 1943 during World War II; the Archbishop of Zagreb Aloysius Stepinac provided him financial support for his studies at the Gregoriana. From 1939 to 1940 he lived at the French Academy in Rome but spent the remainder of that time residing in the Pontifical Lombard Seminary. On 31 October 1942, he was present in St. Peter's Basilica when Pope Pius XII consecrated the world to the Immaculate Heart of Mary.

His bishop recalled him later to his native Istria at the beginning of spring in 1943 for ordination and he received his ordination to the priesthood on 11 April 1943 from his bishop Raffaele Mario Radossi in the parish of Svetvinčenat (Sanvincenti), in Istria. Bulešić celebrated his first Mass two weeks later on 26 April in his old parish. He was assigned to the Baderna parish in the fall of 1943 where the Yugoslav Partisan and Italian forces fought with each other but was later transferred to the parish of Canfanaro (Kanfanar) in the autumn of 1945.

He was considered to be bold and fearless, but was perceived as a great threat and he alluded to this in 1944 in his diary. He said, "I am a Catholic priest and I will distribute the holy sacraments to everyone who asks for it – to Croats, Germans and Italians."

Bulešić's interventions in parish life made church events more attractive to people and he introduced adorations to the Sacred Heart and the Immaculate Heart of Mary in the parish; he encouraged parishioners to recite rosaries together and to receive the sacraments on a frequent basis more so for the children. But the Communists wanted to prevent the faithful from attending Masses and so introduced civil weddings and funerals but people still continued to attend the Masses and listen to their popular priest's homilies. In 1946, some Yugoslav communists were watching people file into the parish and realized that the priest had to be killed for them to exert control over the people.

The regime even approached his family members to have them convince him to return to Italy, but he refused and said to them: "There is a bigger need for priests right here." His relatives also advised him to be careful lest he be killed but he refused to do this. In 1946, he was made the vice-principal and a teacher of seminarians at Pazin and, at the start of March 1947, returned a large cross to its original place in the atrium after unknown hooligans removed it. As the weeks went on it became clear to him that he might be targeted and killed and told his seminarians that to be a priest meant that the shedding of their blood for the faith was an attribute a priest needed to possess.

From 19 August 1947, he accompanied the ecclesial delegate Jakob Ukmar (1878–1971) to several parishes such as Buzet for confirmation celebrations and on 23 August celebrated one such Mass. According to the Catholic Church sources, the Mass was interrupted by a group of communists who burst in and attempted to stop the Mass, but Bulešić rushed to the tabernacle to protect it and said: "You can pass through here only over my dead body". When asked by the intruders whether he was afraid to go to Lanišće, he replied: "You can die only once."

Bulešić went to Lanišće on 24 August 1947 for a Confirmation service and, after Mass, he and Ukmar went to the parish house where, fifteen minutes later, others who were late for the Mass were confirmed. But around 11 AM, several Communist supporters burst into the house and stabbed him to death multiple times in the neck after having been pinned to the ground. He had been close to the door when the attack happened while Ukmar fled to the bedroom but was beaten a minute later and left in a pool of blood on the floor though the attackers believed that he was dead. Blood was all over the walls in the aftermath of the attack and Bulešić twice cried out: "Jesus, take my soul!" The regime did not allow for his remains to be buried in Svetvinčenant but to Lanišće instead, though his remains were later relocated in 1958 to the former. His remains were reinterred later on in 2003.

According to Vladimir Bakarić, the then-Prime Minister of the People's Republic of Croatia, Bulešić's death was the result of an incident that was ignited by Bulešić and Ukmar themselves. They forbid members of the Yugoslav People's Army and participants in the Youth work actions from being confirmation sponsors, contrary to canon law. According to Bakarić, they did this deliberately in order to ignite incidents, which they succeeded in when angry mass protested their decision and attacked them.

== Beatification ==
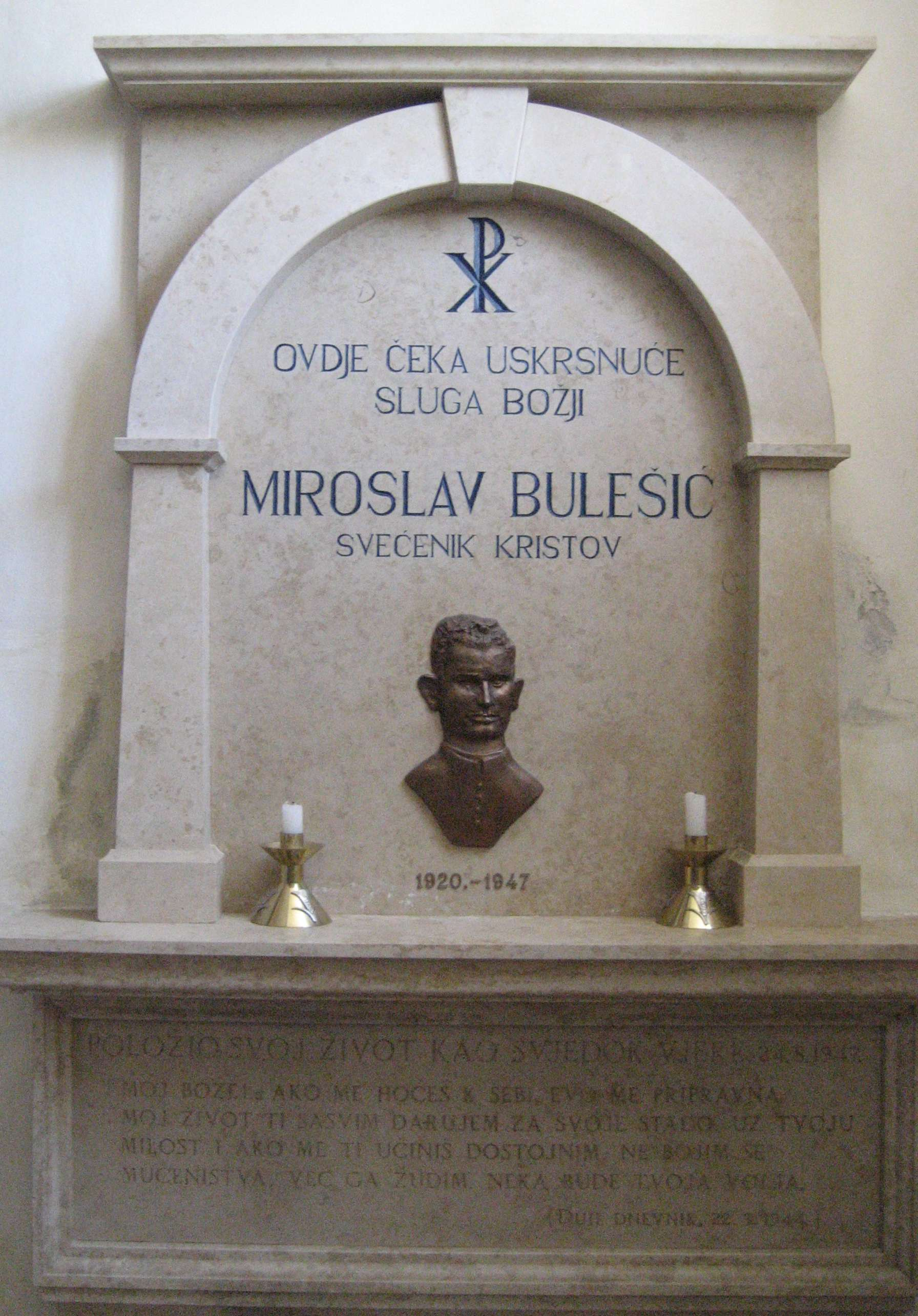
Tomb from 2003.

The process of beatification began under Pope John Paul II on 10 August 1992 after the Congregation for the Causes of Saints issued the nihil obstat ("nothing against" the cause) and titled him as a Servant of God – it was the first official stage in the process. There was an effort to commence the cause in 1956 but the Communists banned this and so an informative process had opened in Rome in 1957 before the cause was transferred to the forum of Poreč-Pula on 28 March 2000 while the diocesan investigation took place. The diocesan process lasted from 24 August 1997 until 11 September 2004 and later received C.C.S. validation in Rome. The Positio was submitted to the Congregation for the Causes of Saints in 2010 and the theologians approved the cause on 30 March 2012. The C.C.S. approved it also on 20 November 2012 while Pope Benedict XVI approved his beatification on 20 December 2012 after confirming that the late priest died in odium fidei ("in hatred of the faith"). The date for the beatification celebration was announced on 12 February 2013.

He was beatified on 28 September 2013 in Istria; Cardinal Angelo Amato presided over the celebration on the behalf of Pope Francis who referred to the beatification on 29 September in his Angelus address. There were about 670 priests and 17 000 pilgrims in attendance as was the Belgrade archbishop Stanislav Hočevar.

The current postulator assigned to the cause is Jure Bogdan.

== Legacy ==
On 7 January 2026, a "Blessed Miroslav Bulešić Hospice" (Hospicij blaženog Miroslava Bulešića) was opened in Pula, established by the Diocese of Poreč-Pula and built in 2020.

== See also ==
- List of saints
