= Jadranska straža =

Non-governmental organisation in Yugoslavia, 1922–1941

Adriatic Guard
- Jadranska straža
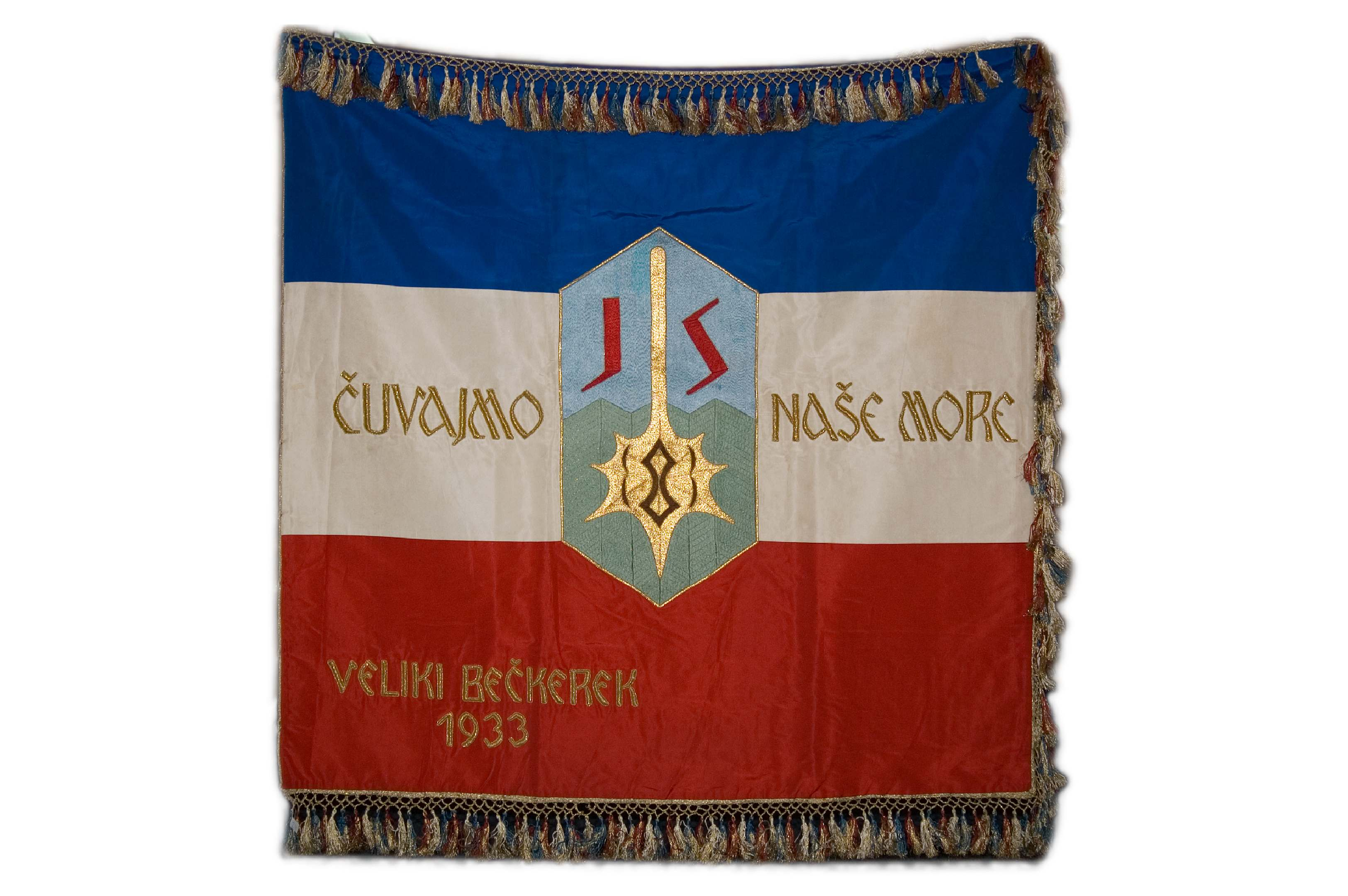
- Flag of Jadranska straža (Veliki Bečkerek council)
- Formation: 19 February 1922
- Dissolved: April 1941
- Type: non-governmental organisation
- Location: Split, Kingdom of Yugoslavia (now Croatia)
- Members: 180,000 (1939)
- President: Juraj Biankini (1922–1928)
- President: Ivo Tartaglia (1928–1941)
- Publication: Jadranska straža

Jadranska straža (lit. 'Adriatic Guard' or 'Adriatic Sentinel') was a volunteer organisation founded in 1922 in Split, in the recently established Kingdom of Serbs, Croats and Slovenes (later renamed Yugoslavia). The organisation's stated objective was the promotion of Yugoslav military, economic, and cultural interests in the Adriatic Sea. By the 1930s, the organisation had more than 500 branches in the country and abroad, and consisted of approximately 180,000 members. Jadranska straža's founding president was Juraj Biankini, who was succeeded by Ivo Tartaglia. The bulk of the organisation's financing was secured through membership fees.

Even though Jadranska straža was a non-governmental organisation, it had a close relationship with the state, supporting the official state ideology of integral Yugoslavism and "national oneness". The Jadranska straža's adherence to the state ideology allowed it to remain active even after introduction of the 6 January Dictatorship in 1929. The organisation welcomed the dictatorship, expecting King Alexander I of Yugoslavia to endorse the Jadranska straža's goals. The organisation had a particularly close relationship with the Ministry of the Army and Navy. In 1925, Jadranska straža started a drive to collect donations for the purchase of Jadran training ship. Members from Dalmatia expected the state to pursue strong development of the region. By the mid-1930s, the government's disinterest in developing Dalmatia caused disappointment and resentment among the Jadranska straža's leaders and members. They gradually shifted to criticising the government while placing a greater emphasis on Dalmatian and Croatian aspects of Adriatic orientation than on pan-Yugoslav themes. Jadranska straža was suppressed and ceased operation during World War II, shortly after the 1941 Invasion of Yugoslavia.

Jadranska straža had significant publishing activity. The organisation's official monthly publication, Jadranska straža – Glasnik udruženja Jadranska straža was published from January 1923 until April 1941. The journal printed maritime-related material, including literary texts, scientific papers, current events, and coverage of topics related to fishing and tourism. The journal published sport news and became Yugoslavia's official rowing journal. The organisation's publications included guide books for various parts of the Adriatic shore and islands. The guide books were also published in German and Czech.

== Background ==
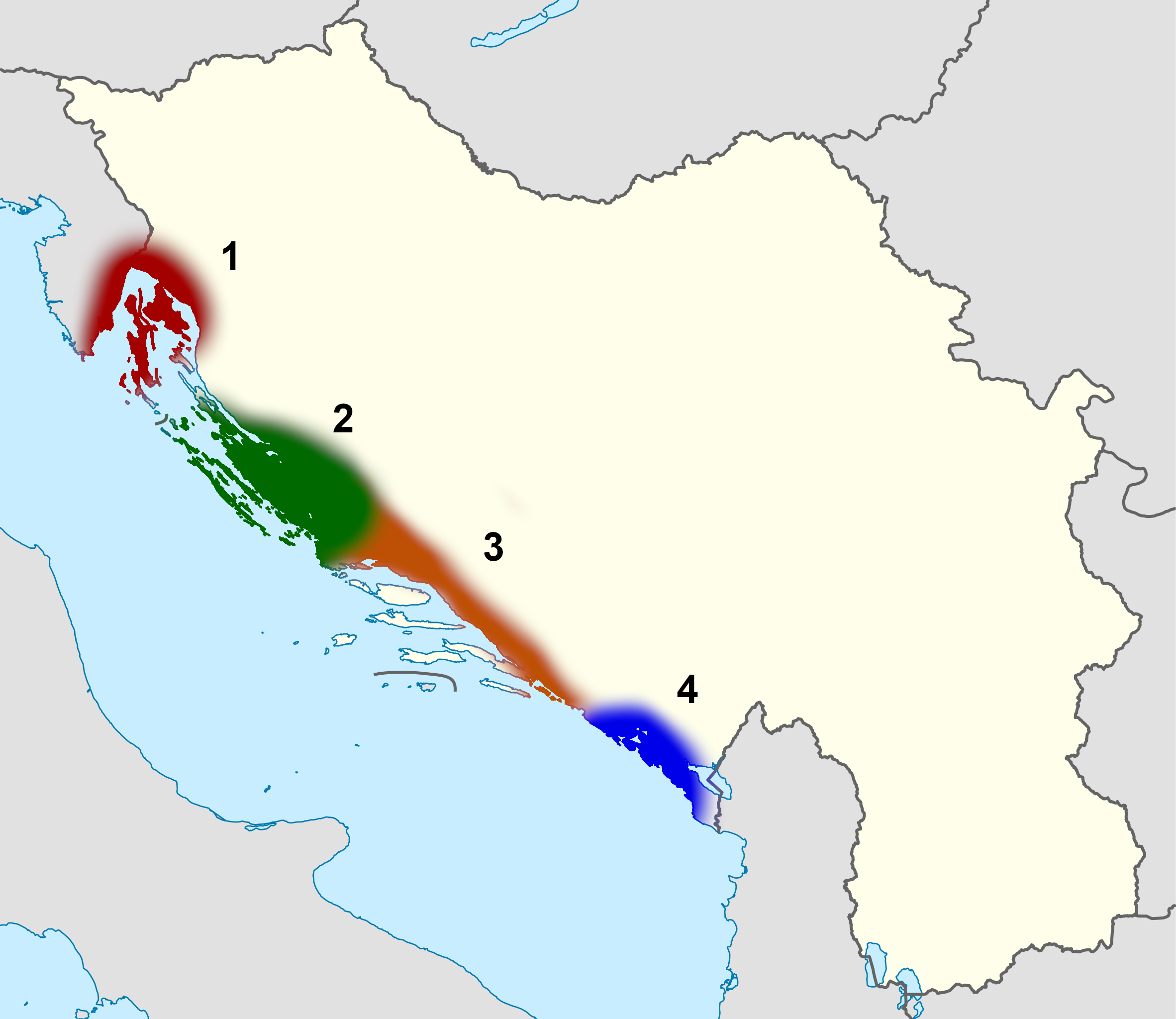
Allied occupation of the eastern Adriatic: 1 British 2 Italian 3 American 4 French zones

In 1915, the Kingdom of Italy entered World War I on the side of the Entente, following the signing of the Treaty of London, which promised Italy territorial gains at the expense of Austria-Hungary. The treaty was opposed by representatives of the South Slavs living in Austria-Hungary, who were organised as the Yugoslav Committee. Following the 1918 Armistice of Villa Giusti and the Austro-Hungarian surrender, Italian troops moved to occupy parts of the Eastern Adriatic shore promised to Italy under the Treaty of London, ahead of the Paris Peace Conference. The Kingdom of Serbs, Croats and Slovenes (later renamed Yugoslavia), established shortly after the war, laid a competing claim to the eastern Adriatic to counter the Italian demands. The problem of establishing the border between Italy and Yugoslavia—known as the Adriatic question—and the future status of Rijeka became major points of dispute at the Paris Peace Conference.

During the Allied occupation of the eastern Adriatic coast, Italy deployed troops not only to its designated zone, but also to other areas. In the British zone, Italian troops captured the city Rijeka and its area, becoming the dominant power in the zone. Most of the area was seized by Gabriele D'Annunzio in late 1919 and ruled as the Italian Regency of Carnaro for the next fifteen months, until Italian recapture of the area. The US forces on the eastern Adriatic shores were tasked with promoting President Woodrow Wilson's policy of self-determination, and the US Navy protected and assisted the provincial government. The French favoured Kingdom of Serbs, Croats and Slovenes control of the coast in their zone of occupation and deployed troops against Italian interests in Montenegro. Civil unrest persisted during the allied occupation. The border was ultimately determined through the 1920 Treaty of Rapallo. Regardless of the treaty, Yugoslavs still felt threatened by the potential Italian territorial expansion in the eastern Adriatic because Italian fascists and irredentists still supposed the claims. The occupation of Yugoslav territories on the eastern Adriatic coast ended in 1921.

== Establishment and leadership ==
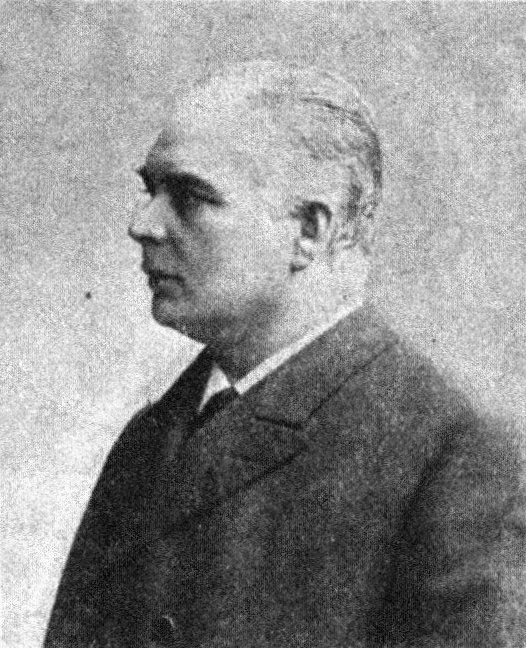
Juraj Biankini, founding president of Jadranska straža

Jadranska straža was established in Split at a public rally held at the present-day Prokurative square on 19 February 1922. The organisation's stated objectives were the promotion of military, commercial and cultural interests of Yugoslavia in the Adriatic Sea and along its shores. Its activities, including publishing periodicals, tourist guide books and support for scientific research, were aimed at fostering love for the Adriatic Sea. Ultimately, Jadranska straža intended to influence public opinion, promoting the perspective that the Adriatic Sea was essential to the country and defining the nation's identity and attempting to align the objectives with the ideology of integral Yugoslavism. Through pursuit of those objectives, Jadranska straža aimed to support economic and cultural development of the Adriatic region and work towards reclaiming the territories awarded to Italy through the Treaty of Rapallo. Historian Branko Petranović held that Jadranska straža was a fascist organisation. It was a typical European Interwar period association drawing on militarism and patriotism.

The organisation was founded by:

- Juraj Biankini, journalist and politician
- Silvije Alfirević, principal of Classical Gymnasium in Split
- Glauko Prebanda, ship-of-the-line lieutenant
- Otokar Lahman, writer
- Ivo Tartaglia, Mayor of Split

It was led by the 12-member central office, which met annually in Split. Biankini served as the association's president from 1922 to 1928. Tartaglia held the position of the vice-president until he succeeded Biankini and then served as president until 1941. King Alexander was the organisation's honorary president. The organisation's seal, inspired by the legend of Prince Marko, was a mace thrown into water flanked by letters "J" and "S".

== Structure and membership ==
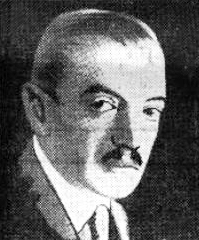
Ivo Tartaglia succeeded Biankini as the president of Jadranska straža.

The organisation had established three main councils in Osijek, Skopje, and Ljubljana by the end of 1922. Within two years, district councils were established in Dubrovnik, Sarajevo, Novi Sad, Zagreb, Belgrade, Kragujevac, Sušak, Niš, Kruševac, Zemun, Veliki Bečkerek, Valjevo, and Karlovac as well as numerous local councils. Jadranska straža intended to establish a branch in every town in the country. It never achieved that objective, but it established 265 branches by 1927, and 507 branches by 1931. Jadranska straža also established ten branches abroad in Europe and in the United States. The organisation established cooperation with other organisations in the country such as the Yugoslav Sokol, Circle of Serbian Sisters, Chetnik organisations, and the Narodna Odbrana. When the terrorist Organization of Yugoslav Nationalists was established in Split in late 1922, its quickly established cooperation with Jadranska straža.

The organisation's reached 40,000 members in 1927, 70,000 in 1931, and 180,000 members in 1939. Jadranska straža relied on membership fees and private donations for the bulk of its income, but some revenue was generated through the sale of the association's publications. The membership fee varied as discounted rates were charged to different groups of members such as workers, peasants, soldiers, children, etc. Only a fraction of the revenue was sent to the central office. Jadranska straža relied on its members' volunteer work or administrative services needed to run the association. The organisation established the Daksa Foundation to support families of mariners who died while at sea. Jadranska straža also established the Maritime Museum in Split, as well as a library and an archive collecting maritime-related publications and Adriatic-related promotional material.

== Relationship with the state ==
=== Initial support ===
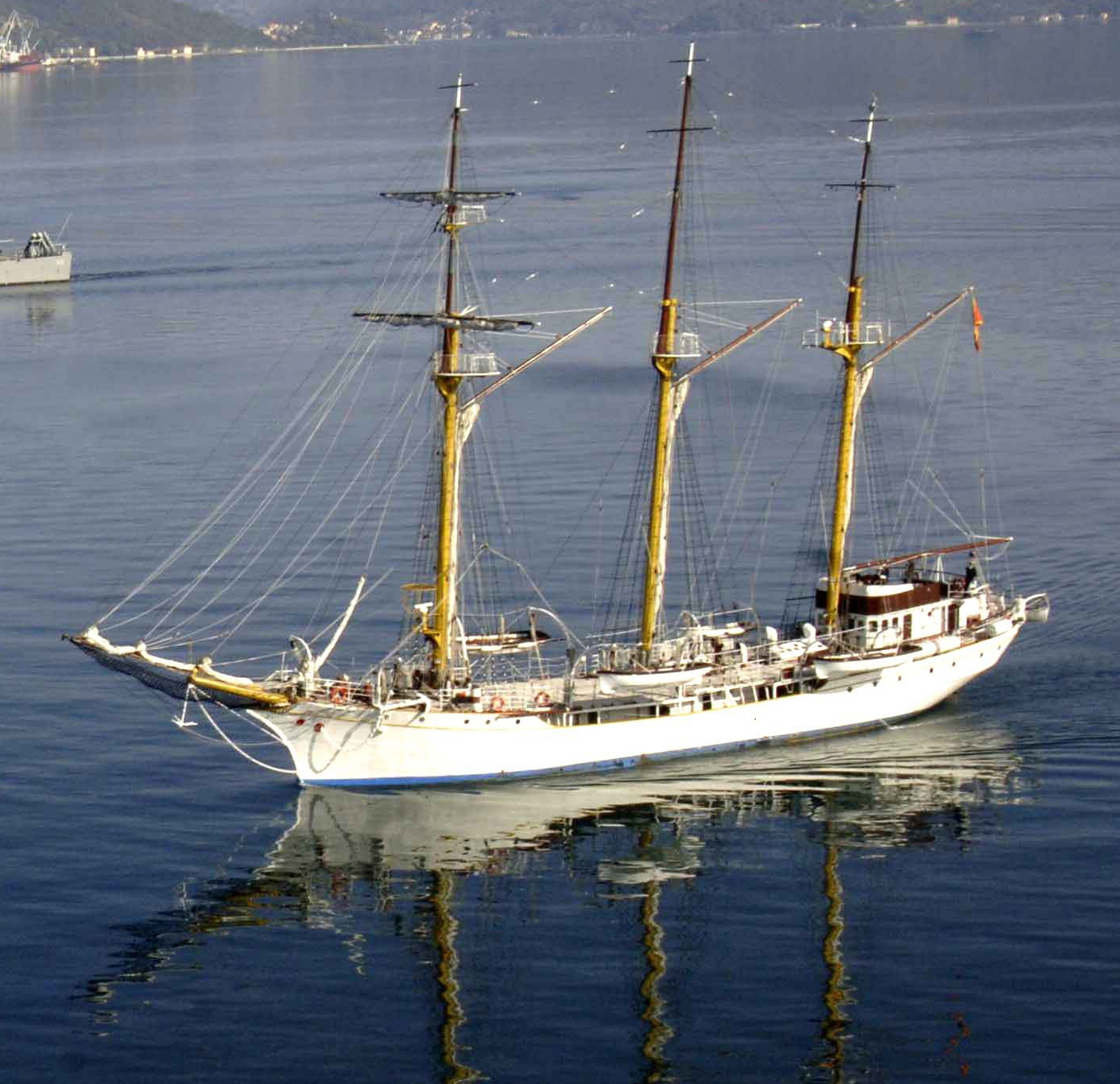
Jadranska straža launched a donations drive for the purchase of Jadran training ship.

Even though Jadranska straža was a non-governmental organisation, it had a close relationship with the state. It did not consider itself a political organisation. Following its establishment, the organisation supported the official state ideology of integral Yugoslavism and "national oneness". Different interpretations of the concept of the "national oneness" caused internal conflicts within the organisation. Namely, the prevailing view among the Split membership was that Croats, Serbs, and Slovenes are tribes of a common nation yet to fully coalesce into a centralised state, but the prevailing view of the Belgrade branch was aligned with that of the People's Radical Party—that Yugoslavia was the Greater Serbia. The conflict was emphasised in mid-1920s, when the Belgrade branch, led by Ljubomir Jovanović, unsuccessfully tried to relocate organisation's headquarters to Belgrade. Regardless of the conflict, the organisation's adherence to the state ideology made it possible for the organisation to remain active even after introduction of dictatorship in 1929. The organisation welcomed the dictatorship and expected the king to finally fully endorse the Jadranska straža's goals.

Jadranska straža enjoyed a particularly close relationship with the Ministry of the Army and Navy and its membership included generals and admirals. The organisation viewed Regia Marina as a threat to Dalmatia and urged development of the Royal Yugoslav Navy, aiming to mimic the German Navy League in this respect. In 1925, Jadranska straža called for donations to purchase a training ship. The organisation collected only an eighth of the required funds, but the Ministry of the Army and Navy funded the remainder through loans and German World War I reparations. The Jadran training ship was ordered.

=== Growing criticism ===
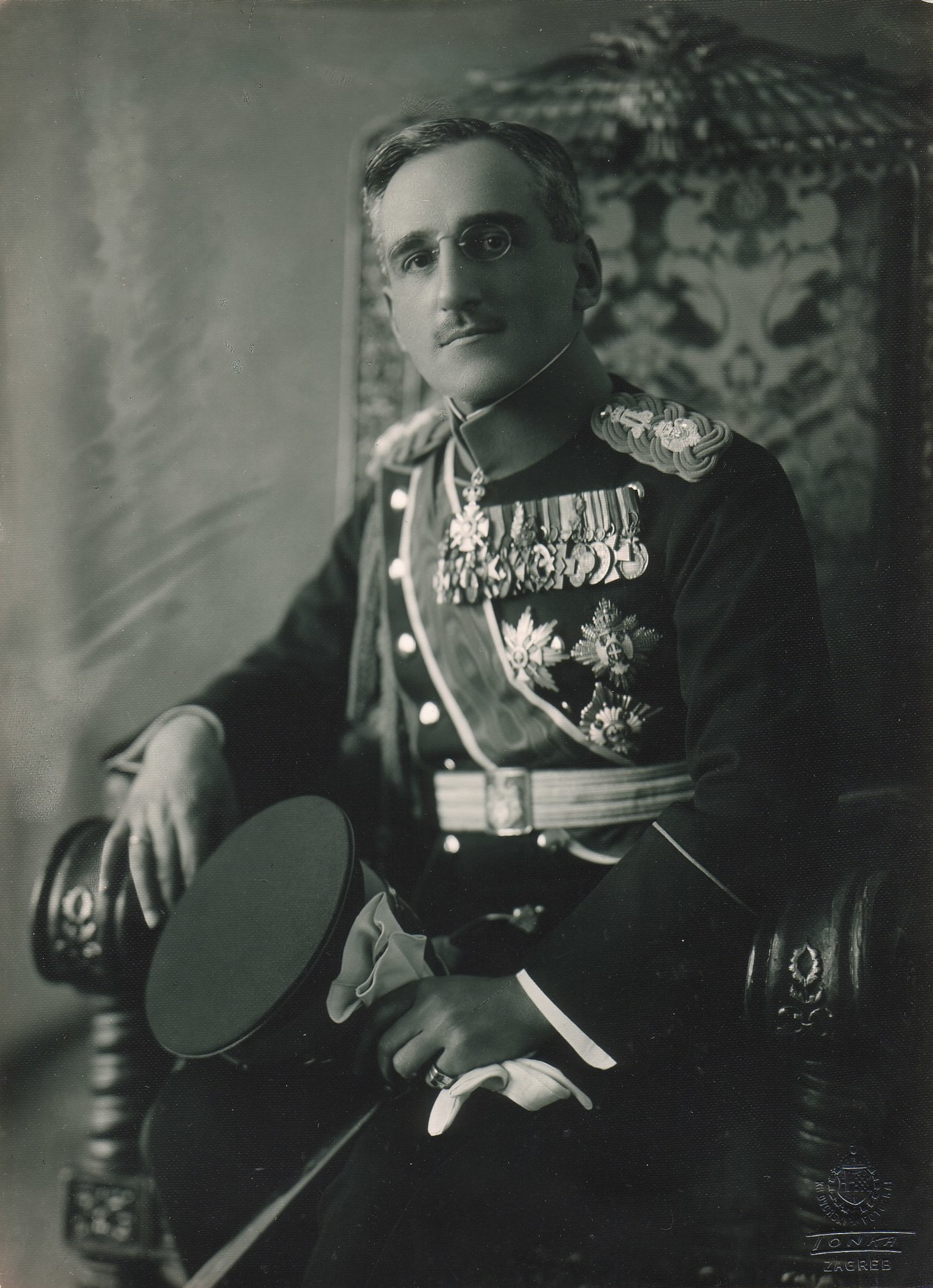
King Alexander I of Yugoslavia was the honorary president of Jadranska straža.

Members of the organisation living in Dalmatia expected the state to pursue vigorous economic development of the region and the entire Adriatic coast. Despite Jadranska straža's lobbying efforts, the national government continued to prioritise routes of transportation oriented to the Port of Thessaloniki in Greece. This was at least in part due to lack of rail connections between Dalmatia and the rest of the country and the challenging terrain in the coastal hinterland. The Lika Railway connecting Split to Zagreb opened only in 1925, and construction of the Una Railway advocated by Jadranska straža did not start until 1936. The Belgrade government's disinterest in developing Dalmatia caused disappointment and resentment among the organisation's leaders and members. In the process, the organisation moved from full support of the national government to sharp criticism by 1933. In the 1930s, the branches set up in the east of the country (in areas of pre-World War I Serbia and Montenegro) became less active.

Beginning in 1934, the central office directed its branches to organise activities, placing a greater emphasis on Dalmatian and Croatian aspects of Adriatic orientation than on pan-Yugoslav themes, and Tartaglia endorsed the 1934 Zagreb Memorandum crtiticising the central government for neglecting Croatian political and cultural demands. In November 1934, Tartaglia resigned from the office, only to be reelected president in 1935. In the following period, Split and Belgrade-based offices of Jadranska straža diverged ideologically as the Split-based part of the organisation started to depart from integral towards federal Yugoslavism. In late 1937 or early 1938, Tartaglia, accompanied by fellow-member sculptor Ivan Meštrović, visited Vladko Maček, the leader of the Croatian Peasant Party (HSS, the most influential Croatian political party in the interwar period). Tartaglia and Meštrović asked Maček to urge HSS members to join Jadranska straža in order to help fight against the pressure to move the organisation's headquarters to Belgrade.

=== Closer ties with the HSS ===
Following the 1939 Cvetković–Maček Agreement and establishment of Banovina of Croatia, the Croatian Seafaring Society Janko Vuković Podkapelski (Hrvatsko društvo za pomorstvo Janko Vuković Podkapelski) was established in Zagreb under the HSS patronage. At least a part of the declared intended activities of the society overlapped with those of Jadranska straža. This prompted Tartaglia to meet with the head of Banovina of Croatia, Ivan Šubašić, to discuss adjusting Jadranska straža's activities to the positions and policies of the HSS. This included closer ties between Jadranska straža and paramilitary wing of the HSS, the Croatian Peasant Defence. There was a view held by a part of the HSS that Jadranska straža would contribute a maritime component to the paramilitary force.

Subsequently, the organisation was touting the Adriatic orientation not to connect all Yugoslavs, but as a cohesive element to unite Croats. At the same time, Jadranska straža gave full support to establishment of Banovina of Croatia as a vehicle for realising Croatian political demands. In 1940, Maček himself joined Jadranska straža, abandoning his caution in supporting Jadranska straža expressed in 1938. Jadranska straža's branches based outside Banovina of Croatia condemned the shift in policy towards the HSS and the organisation was internally divided on further course of action. The debate was interrupted by the 1941 Invasion of Yugoslavia.

=== Dissolution ===
In April 1941, the Axis powers established the puppet state of the Independent State of Croatia (NDH) which promised to cede a portion of the Adriatic coast to Italy. In response, Zagreb chapter of Jadranska straža decided to cease active operations, except office work, until the situation cleared up. It also instructed all local organisations of Jadranska straža to refer to the organisation as Hrvatska Jadranska straža (lit. 'Croatian Adriatic Guard'). In July, the NDH authorities appointed an administrator of Jadranska straža pending its liquidation on 30 May 1942. The NDH authorities established the Hrvatski Jadran (lit. 'Croatian Adriatic') society and intended it to take over assets of Jadranska straža. The procedure was postponed because the organisation's most valuable assets were in Split, which the NDH ceded to Italy under the Treaties of Rome. Namely, the organisation's charter specified that its assets were to be transferred to the Royal Yugoslav Navy in case of dissolution, but the navy's assets were being transferred to Italy under the terms of the Yugoslav surrender. In response, the NDH halted the procedure and Jadranska straža was dissolved only after the Second World War.

== Publishing activity ==
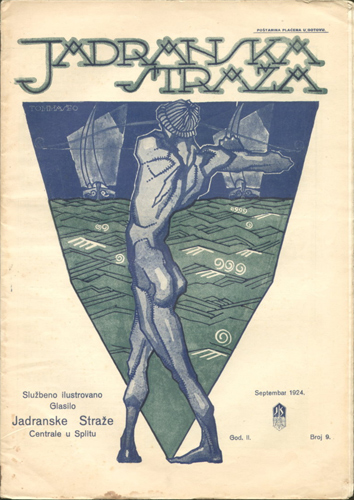
Jadranska straža published an eponymous journal from 1923 to 1941.

Jadranska straža had significant publishing activity. In addition to a journal, it printed leaflets, posters, brochures and other ephemera. The official publication of the organisation, Jadranska straža – Glasnik udruženja Jadranska straža (lit. 'Adriatic Guard – Gazette of Adriatic Guard Association'), commonly referred to as Jadranska straža, was published from January 1923 until April 1941. It was normally published once a month (except twice as bi-monthly issues in 1925 and 1938) in Split. Until 1929, the journal's sole editor was Alfirević. He was joined by Niko Bartulović and Lahman as co-editors in 1929 and 1930. Živko Vekarić and Jakša Ravlić joined the editing board in 1930 for a year. They and Alfirević quit the role in 1931. Ravlić edited the journal from 1936 until its final issue. The journal was published predominantly in Croatian, and the remainder was in Serbian or, rarely, in Slovene. A part of the journal was printed in the Latin and a part in the Cyrillic script, with the cover alternating between the two scripts every month. Mimicking the practice of other Yugoslav unitarist journals, it was common to apply the ekavian "pronunciation" to the Latin script texts, and the ijekavian to the Cyrillic script materials.

The journal published all maritime-related material, including literary texts and scientific papers. It also covered current events, as well as topics related to fishing and tourism. The journal published sport news, particularly related to the Gusar Rowing Club and became the official journal of rowing in Yugoslavia. Style and rhetoric of the journal mimicked those of early Italian fascist organisations. The circulation of Jadranska straža reached 20,000.

Jadranska straža's Belgrade council published the Almanah Jadranske straže (lit. 'Adriatic Guard's Almanac') annually in 1925–1927 and in 1929, with more than 500 pages of text in each issue. The organisation's Zagreb council published monthly journal Naše more (lit. 'Our Sea') from 1935–1939 and monthly More (lit. 'Sea') in 1940–1941 as the journal of Jadranska straža of Banovina of Croatia. In various periods, Jadranska straža also published several youth magazines and calendars. The organisation's publications included guide books for Dubrovnik, the Bay of Kotor, Split, Trogir, Hvar and Vis, and the northern Adriatic. The guide books had two bilingual editions, one in German and the other in Czech.

== Legacy ==
After the Second World War, the Socialist Federative Republic of Yugoslavia proclaimed the Adriatic orientation one of its strategic objectives, echoing the calls of prewar Jadranska straža. However, the proclaimed objective was not fully achieved. The Adriatic orientation became a necessity following a conflict with the Soviet Union and the Tito–Stalin split in 1948 accompanied by the loss of the Eastern Bloc export markets. There was an unsuccessful attempt to reestablish Jadranska straža in Rijeka in 1954. Following the breakup of Yugoslavia and the independence of Croatia, the Adriatic orientation once again became a proclaimed objective—in Croatia. The idea gained momentum in the geopolitical context of the Three Seas Initiative.

== Sources ==
- "Jadranska straža". Croatian Encyclopedia (in Croatian). Zagreb: Miroslav Krleža Institute of Lexicography.
- Banac, Ivo (1984). The National Question in Yugoslavia: Origins, History, Politics. Ithaca: Cornell University Press. ISBN 0-8014-1675-2.
- Bartulović, Željko (2013). "Talijanska okupacija Sušaka 1918. – 1923." [Italian Occupation of Sušak 1918–1923] (PDF). In Jurković, Ivan (ed.). Bertošin zbornik: Zbornik u čast Miroslava Bertoše [Bertoša's Proceedings: Proceedings in Honour of Miroslav Bertoša] (PDF) (in Croatian). Vol. 3. Pula: Juraj Dobrila University of Pula. pp. 159–178. ISBN 978-953-7498-69-6.
- Becherelli, Alberto (2016). "Montenegro betrayed: The Yugoslav unification and the controversial inter-allied occupation". Balkan Studies (51). Thessaloniki: Institute for Balkan Studies: 69–104. ISSN 2241-1674.
- Crkvenac, Mato (1993). "Economic Policy and Adriatic Maritime Orientation of Croatia". Acta Turistica. 5 (1). Faculty of Economics and Business, University of Zagreb: 5–16. ISSN 0353-4316. JSTOR 23232294.
- Cukrov, Mladen (2013). "Admiral Philip Andrews u Splitu" [Allied Peacekeeping Mission in Split After the First World War and the Role of the U.S. Admiral Philip Andrews]. Kulturna baština (in Croatian). 39 (1). Split: Društvo prijatelja kulturne baštine: 97–112. ISSN 0351-0557.
- Davidonis, Anthony C. (1943). The American Naval Mission in the Adriatic, 1918–1921 (PDF). Washington, DC: United States Department of the Navy. OCLC 1112737551.
- Đurašković, Stevo (2011). "Ideologija Organizacije jugoslovenskih nacionalista (Orjuna)" [The Ideology of the Organization of Yugoslav Nationalists (Orjuna)]. Časopis za suvremenu povijest (in Croatian). 43 (1). Zagreb: Croatian Institute of History: 225–247. ISSN 0590-9597.
- Freivogel, Zvonimir (2020). Warships of the Royal Yugoslav Navy 1918–1945. Zagreb: Despot Infinitus. ISBN 978-953-8218-72-9.
- Gabriel, Ralph H. (1944). "American Experience with Military Government". The American Historical Review. 49 (4). Oxford: Oxford University Press: 630–643. doi:10.2307/1850219. ISSN 0002-8762. JSTOR 1850219.
- Karaula, Željko (2022). "Politička ideologija Jadranske straže (1922. – 1941.)" [Political Ideology of the Adriatic Guard (1922–1941)]. In Radić, Danka (ed.). Naše more "mare nostrum" (1069. – 2019.): prigodom 950. obljetnice prvog spomena Jadrana "našim morem" [Our Sea "Mare Nostrum" (1069–2019): On the Occasion of the 950th Anniversary of the First Mention of the Adriatic as "Our Sea"] (in Croatian). Split: Croatian Maritime Museum. pp. 391–414. ISBN 9789537742232.
- Knox, MacGregor (2007). To the Threshold of Power, 1922/33: Origins and Dynamics of the Fascist and Nationalist Socialist Dictatorships. Vol. I. Cambridge: Cambridge University Press. ISBN 978-0-521-87860-9.
- Krstulović, Vicko (1968). "Jadranska orijentacija" [Adriatic Orientation]. Naše more (in Croatian). 15 (3–4). University of Dubrovnik: 178–181. ISSN 0469-6255.
- Lovrić, Mirja (2009). "Prilog poznavanju izdavačke djelatnosti Jadranske straže iz fonda knjižnice Hrvatskoga pomorskog muzeja u Splitu" [Publishing Activities of Jadranska straža as Referred to in the Library Holdings of Maritime Museum in Split]. Kulturna baština (in Croatian) (35). Split: Društvo prijatelja kulturne baštine Split: 355–380. ISSN 0351-0557.
- Lozančić, Marinko; Zdilar, Slaven; Fuerst-Bjeliš, Borna (2020). "Geostrategic Aspect of the Danubian-Adriatic Orientation of the Croatian Geographical Space". Geoadria. 25 (2). University of Zadar: 111–150. doi:10.15291/geoadria.3038. ISSN 1331-2294.
- Machiedo-Mladinić, Norka (1992). "Izgradnja Splita u desetogodišnjem periodu (1918.–1928.)" [The Building of Split During the Decade 1918–1928]. Časopis za suvremenu povijest (in Croatian). 24 (2). Zagreb: Croatian Institute of History: 115–123. ISSN 0590-9597.
- MacMillan, Margaret (2002). Paris 1919: Six Months That Changed the World. New York City: Random House Publishing Group. ISBN 9780375760525.
- Merlicco, Giordano (2021). "Between old Austria and new foes: Italy and the Yugoslav project (1917-1918)" (PDF). Istorijski Zapisi. XCIV (1–2). Podgorica: Istorijski institut Crne Gore: 115–138. ISSN 0021-2652.
- Newman, John Paul (2015). Yugoslavia in the Shadow of War: Veterans and the Limits of State Building, 1903–1945. Cambridge: Cambridge University Press. ISBN 978-1-107-07076-9.
- Nielsen, Christian Axboe (2014). Making Yugoslavs: Identity in King Aleksandar's Yugoslavia. Toronto: University of Toronto Press. ISBN 9781442627505.
- Pavlowitch, Kosta St. (2003). "The First World War and Unification of Yugoslavia". In Djokic, Dejan (ed.). Yugoslavism: Histories of a Failed Idea, 1918–1992. London: C. Hurst & Co. pp. 27–41. ISBN 1-85065-663-0.
- Pizzi, Katia (2001). A City in Search of an Author. London: Sheffield Academic Press. ISBN 9780567244970.
- Ramet, Sabrina P. (2006). The Three Yugoslavias: State-building and Legitimation, 1918–2005. Bloomington: Indiana University Press. ISBN 9780253346568.
- Rudolf, Davorin (2008). "Granice s Italijom u mirovnim ugovorima nakon Prvoga i Drugog svjetskog rata" [Borders With Italy in Peace Treaties Following World War I and World War II]. Adrias: Zbornik radova Zavoda za znanstveni i umjetnički rad Hrvatske akademije znanosti i umjetnosti u Splitu (in Croatian) (15). Zagreb: Croatian Academy of Sciences and Arts: 61–80. ISSN 0352-9924.
- Tchoukarine, Igor (2011). "The Contested Adriatic Sea: The Adriatic Guard and Identity Politics in Interwar Yugoslavia". Austrian History Yearbook. 42 (42). Cambridge: Cambridge University Press: 33–51. doi:10.1017/S0067237811000038. ISSN 0067-2378.
- Tchoukarine, Igor (2019). "To serve the King, the State and the people: the Adriatic Guard's ambiguous position in interwar Yugoslavia". European Review of History. 26 (1). Abingdon-on-Thames: Taylor & Francis: 121–140. doi:10.1080/13507486.2018.1468737. ISSN 1350-7486.
