= Juraj Jezerinac =

Croatian Roman Catholic prelate (born 1939)

- Ordinary Emeritus of Military Ordinariate of Croatia
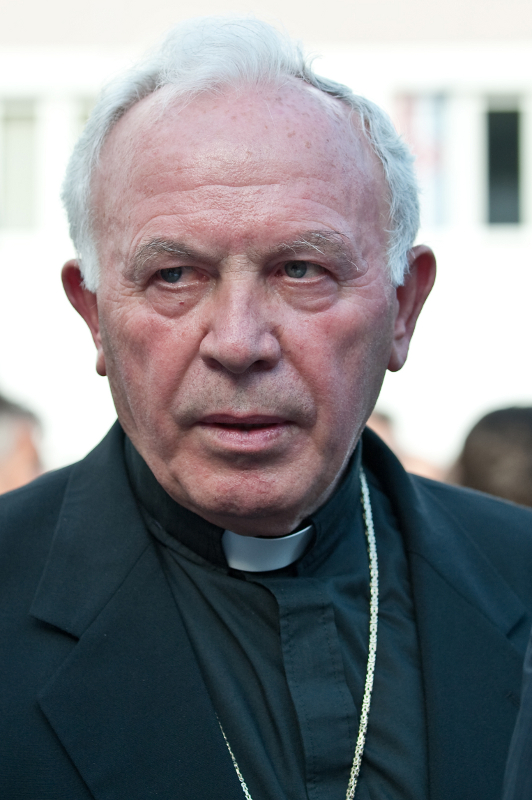
- Church: Roman Catholic Church
- Appointed: 25 April 1997
- Term ended: 30 November 2015
- Predecessor: New creation
- Successor: Jure Bogdan
- Other posts: Titular Bishop of Strumnitza and Auxiliary Bishop of Archdiocese of Zagreb (1991–1997)

Orders
- Ordination: 26 June 1966 (Priest)
- Consecration: 8 June 1991 (Bishop) by Cardinal Franjo Kuharić

Personal details
- Born: Juraj Jezerinac; 23 April 1939 (age 87) Jezerine, Kingdom of Yugoslavia (modern Croatia)
- Education: University of Zagreb

Bishop Juraj Jezerinac (born 23 April 1939) is a Croatian Roman Catholic prelate who served as a Titular Bishop of Strumnitza and Auxiliary Bishop of Archdiocese of Zagreb from 11 April 1991 until 25 April 1997 and the first Ordinary of the new created Military Ordinariate of Croatia since 25 April 1997 until his retirement on 30 November 2015.

== Education ==
Bishop Jezerinac was born into a Croatian Roman Catholic family of Mijo and Barica (née Bradica) near Krašić in the Central Croatia.

After graduating from a classical gymnasium in Šalata, Zagreb, he consequently joined the Theological Faculty at the University of Zagreb, and was ordained as a priest on 26 June 1966 to his native the Roman Catholic Archdiocese of Zagreb, after completing his philosophical and theological studies.

== Pastoral work ==
From 1967 to 1969, Fr. Jezerinac served as chaplain in Nova Gradiška, and from 1969 to 1971 he was the parish priest in Završje. From 1971 to 1980 he served as parish priest in the newly established parish of the Heart of Mary in Sesvetski Kraljevec. He then went to Canada where he performed the following services: from 1980 to 1985 he was chaplain of the Croatian parish of Our Lady the Queen of Croats in Toronto; from 1985 to 1986 parish administrator in Oakville, and from 1986 to 1988 chaplain in Hamilton. From 1988 to 1991 he was parish priest of the Croatian parish in Oakville.

On 11 April 1991, he was appointed by Pope John Paul II as an Auxiliary Bishop of the Archdiocese of Zagreb. On 8 June 1991, he was consecrated as bishop by Cardinal Franjo Kuharić and other prelates of the Roman Catholic Church in the Cathedral of Assumption of Blessed Virgin Mary and St. Stephen of Hungary in Zagreb. Six years later, on 25 April 1997, he became the first Ordinary of the new created Military Ordinariate of Croatia.

He retired on 30 November 2015, after reaching the age limit of 75 years.

Catholic Church titles
Preceded by Jesús Emilio Jaramillo Monsalve	Titular Bishop of Strumnitza; 1991–1997	Succeeded by Method Kilaini
New title	Ordinary of Military Ordinariate of Croatia; 1997–2015	Succeeded by Jure Bogdan
