= List of Catholic dioceses in Croatia =

The Roman Catholic Church in Croatia is composed of four ecclesiastical provinces, 12 suffragan dioceses, one military ordinariate and one diocese immediately subject to the Holy See .

== List of Dioceses ==
=== Ecclesiastical Province of Rijeka ===
- Archdiocese of Rijeka
  - Diocese of Gospić–Senj
  - Diocese of Krk
  - Diocese of Poreč i Pula

=== Ecclesiastical Province of Đakovo-Osijek ===
- Archdiocese of Đakovo-Osijek
  - Diocese of Požega
  - Diocese of Syrmia (Serbia)

=== Ecclesiastical Province of Split-Makarska ===
- Archdiocese of Split-Makarska
  - Diocese of Dubrovnik
  - Diocese of Hvar
  - Diocese of Šibenik
  - Diocese of Kotor (Montenegro)

=== Ecclesiastical Province of Zagreb ===
- Archdiocese of Zagreb
  - Diocese of Bjelovar-Križevci
  - Diocese of Sisak
  - Diocese of Varaždin
  - Eparchy of Križevci (Byzantine rite)

=== Immediately subject to the Holy See ===
- Archdiocese of Zadar

=== Sui iuris Jurisdictions ===
- Military Ordinariate of Croatia
