= Ante Biankini =

Croatian politician and physician (1860 – 1934)

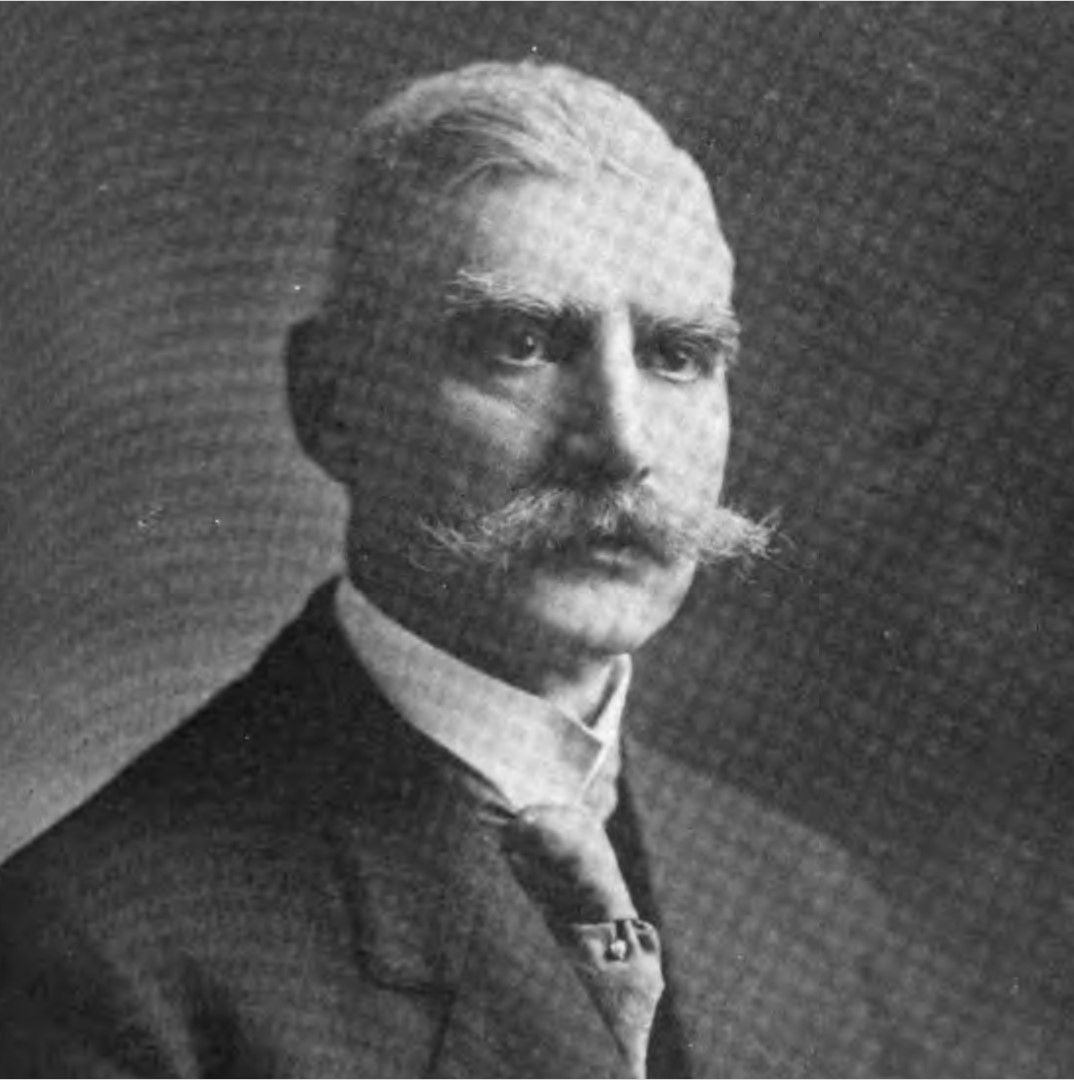
- Born: 31 August 1860; Stari Grad, Kingdom of Dalmatia, Austrian Empire (now Croatia)
- Died: 9 February 1934 (aged 73)b Chicago, United States
- Education: University of Vienna
- Occupations: Politician, physician
- Relatives: Juraj Biankini (brother); Petar Luka Bianchini (brother)

Ante Biankini (Stari Grad, Hvar. 31 August 1860 – Chicago, 9 February 1934) was a physician, author, criminologist, publisher and Croatian and Yugoslavian politician. He studied medicine at the University of Vienna and graduated in 1886. Biankini worked as a physician in Vienna and native Stari Grad before marrying concert pianist Zlata Albrecht, daughter of Croatian Lithographer and Printer Carl Dragutin Albrecht, and moving to Chicago.

In the United States, he worked with surgeon John Benjamin Murphy at the Chicago Mercy Hospital in 1898–1916 as well as at the Columbus Hospital in New York in 1904–1906. Biankini taught at the Northwestern University in 1900–1915. Biankini was a member of the Croatian Fraternal Union. He became engaged in advocacy of political unity of the South Slavs through the Hrvatska zastava (lit. Croatian Flag) and the Jugoslavenska zastava (lit. Yugoslav Flag) journals he funded in 1914–1916 and 1917–1918 respectively.

At the First Yugoslav Congress held in Chicago in 1915, Biankini was elected the president of the Yugoslav National Committee in the United States. The following year, he took part in the initiative to raise volunteer troops for the Allies of World War I, specifically for the Salonica front and joined the Yugoslav Committee—an ad-hoc group of politicians and activists advocating unification of the South Slavs living in Austria-Hungary and the Kingdom of Serbia. Biankini discussed the issue of unification of the South Slavs and the need to defend their interests within the framework of the Adriatic question with the President of the United States Woodrow Wilson. Biankini's brother Juraj was the editor of the Zadar-based Narodni list, and a member of the Austro-Hungarian Imperial Council—a signatory of the 1917 May Declaration authored by the Yugoslav Club of the South Slavic council members.

He published works on Croatian political and cultural themes in the following newspapers:

Hrvatski trgovac (1899), Hrvatska domovina (1900), Obzor (1900, 1911), Banovac (1904), Hrvatski narodni glas (1904), Osvit (1904, 1907), Narodni list (Zadar 1905, 1906, 1908, 1911–1914), Agramer Tagblatt (1910), Sloboda (Beograd 1915), Narod (1918), Hrvatski sokolski koledar (Chicago 1919), Jugoslavenska država (1919), Riječ Srba, Hrvata, Slovenaca (1919), Novo doba (Split 1920, 1928), Srpski narodni kalendar (1920), Nova Evropa (1927), Slobodna tribuna (Zagreb 1931).

== Selected works ==
- Kriminalna Sociologija: Smrtna kazna-znanstveno umorstvo-euthanasia [en. Criminal sociology](1909)
- 19 slučajeva "Railway Spine" (1906)
- Amerikanski način uzgoja i školstva (1910)
- Amerika za Jugoslaviju (1926)
- Upoznavanje samoga sebe (1913)
