= Juraj Biankini =

Croatian politician and journalist (1847–1928)

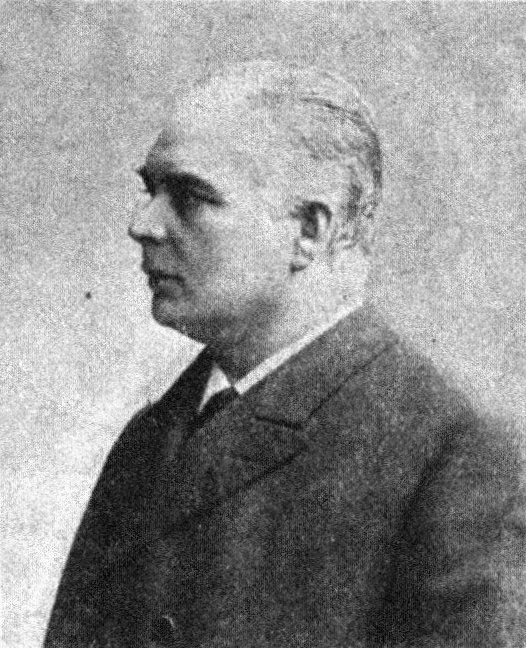
- Juraj Biankini
- Born: 30 August 1847; Stari Grad, Kingdom of Dalmatia, Austrian Empire (now Croatia)
- Died: 27 March 1928 (aged 80); Split; Kingdom of Serbs, Croats and Slovenes (now Croatia)
- Occupations: Politician, journalist
- Political party: People's Party; Party of Rights; Democratic Party
- Relatives: Ante Biankini (brother); Petar Luka Biankini (brother)

Juraj Biankini (30 August 1847 in Stari Grad – 27 March 1928 in Split) was a journalist and Croatian and Yugoslavian politician. He moved to Zadar to attend high school and theological seminary (a part of the present-day University of Zadar). In 1871, Biankini became the editor of the Zadar-based Narodni list at urging of Mihovil Pavlinović, the leader of the Croatian National Revival in Dalmatia. He retained the position until 1918 (when Zadar was captured by the Kingdom of Italy enforcing the Treaty of London). Biankini's work helped the newspaper attain a leading position in the region.

Biankini was elected a member of the Diet of Dalmatia (1881–1887 and 1889–1918), and a member of the Imperial Council (1892–1918). Initially, he was a member of the People's Party, but he left its ranks in disagreement with the party's opportunistic policies—together with fellow Imperial Council members Josip Virgil Perić, Vjekoslav Spinčić, Nikola Dapar, and Matko Laginja. He subsequently co-founded the Party of Rights chapter in the Austro-Hungarian crown land of Dalmatia. In 1903, Biankini signed a petition protesting against the repressive rule of the Ban of Croatia Károly Khuen-Héderváry, and started to work on reconciliation of the People's Party and the Party of Rights—resulting in fusion of the two parties in 1905. The same year, Biankini accepted and signed the Rijeka Resolution, adopting the New Course Policy promoting cooperation between Croat and Croatian Serb political parties. In the Imperial Council, Biankini was a part of the Yugoslav Club which adopted the May Declaration advocating a reform of Austria-Hungary allowing its South Slavic population to unite in a single polity within the empire in 1917.

Following establishment of the Kingdom of Serbs, Croats and Slovenes in 1918, Biankini was appointed a member of the Temporary National Representation, the provisional legislative body of the new state. In the period, he adopted the integral Yugoslavism as his political stance, subsequently favouring a lesser degree of centralisation of the multinational state. In the period after the World War I, Biankini joined the Democratic Party and he was appointed the deputy prime minister in the government of Ljubomir Davidović. Biankini was the first president of Jadranska straža association from 1923 to 1928 and he contributed to the eponymous journal published by the association. His Brother Ante was a member of the Yugoslav Committee, an ad-hoc group of politicians and activists advocating unification of the South Slavs living in Austria-Hungary with the Kingdom of Serbia.
