= Ivo Tartaglia =

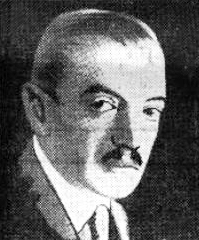

Mayor of Split
- In office 2 November 1918 – 25 November 1928
- Preceded by: Josip Smodlaka
- Succeeded by: Petar Bonetti

1st Ban of Littoral Banovina
- In office 9 October 1929 – 5 July 1932
- Preceded by: Position established
- Succeeded by: Josip Jablanović

Personal details
- Born: 6 February 1880 Split, Dalmatia, Austria-Hungary
- Died: 3 April 1949 (aged 69) Lepoglava, PR Croatia, FPR Yugoslavia

Dr. Ivo Tartaglia (Croatian pronunciation: [ǐːʋo tartâʎa]; 5 February 1880 – 3 April 1949) was "a committed anti-fascist", a former ban (governor) of the province of Littoral Banovina (Croatian/Serbo-Croat: Primorska banovina), and the 32nd mayor of Split, Yugoslavia (in what is today known as Croatia).

== Biography ==
Tartaglia was born in Split in 1880. He grew up in a noble family with Dalmatian Italian roots.

He was known as a patron, art lover, bibliophile, and collector. On 29 May 1928, the Split Town Hall decided to form the Gallery of Fine Arts, but due to a lack of funds, the Gallery did not open until 1 December 1931 (as the Gallery of Fine Arts of the Coastal Province). Tartaglia's bequest added more than 300 works to the Gallery's holdings.

Following the death of Juraj Biankini, Tartaglia became the president of Jadranska straža.

In June 1948, Tartaglia was put on trial in Split, along with others, on charges of having expressed pro-Mussolini sentiments and otherwise undermining the government of the Socialist Federal Republic of Yugoslavia. (Tartaglia had opposed Mussolini during World War II.) He was sentenced to seven years at hard labor, plus the loss of his civic rights for two years after that, as well as having all of his property confiscated.

Tartaglia died in 1949 at the Lepoglava prison.

== Mayor of Split ==
He was responsible for building the Ličke railways in 1925, which connected peninsular Split to the mainland. At the time, Yugoslavia would not finance the construction of railways. Tartaglia enlisted entrepreneurs and savings banks to support the project. During his incumbency, the zoo opened, airports were expanded and modernized, and a meteorological station was built.

== Ban of Littoral Banovina ==
Tartaglia was the ban of Littoral Banovina from 9 October 1929 to June 1932.

The ban started a series of projects in Littoral Banovina, building hospitals in Biograd, draining wetlands and the improvement of agriculture, among other projects.

Between 1929 and 1932, during Tartaglia's tenure, the ban of Littoral Banovina was based in Split.

Political offices
Preceded by Josip Smodlaka	Mayor of Split; 1918 – 1928	Succeeded by Petar Bonetti
Preceded by post created	Ban of Littoral Banovina; 1929 – 1932	Succeeded by Josip Jablanović
