= Jadranska straža (magazine) =

Journal of Jadranska straža organisation

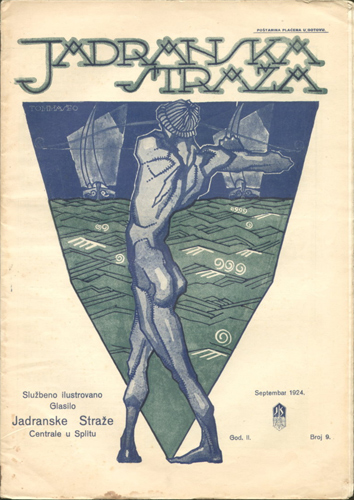
- September 1924 cover
- Frequency: Monthly
- Publisher: Jadranska straža
- First issue: January 1923; 103 years ago
- Final issue: April 1941; 84 years ago
- Country: Kingdom of Yugoslavia
- Language: Serbian, Croatian, Slovenian
- ISSN: 1331-6699

Jadranska straža (lit. 'Adriatic Guard' or 'Adriatic Sentinel') was the official publication of the Jadranska straža organisation. The publication's full title was Jadranska straža – Glasnik udruženja Jadranska straža (lit. 'Adriatic Guard – Courier of Adriatic Guard Association'), but it was commonly referred to using the abbreviated title. The first issue was published under the title Jadranska straža – Službeno ilustrovano glasilo Jadranske straže – Centrale u Splitu (lit. 'Adriatic Guard – Official Illustrated Courier of the Adriatic Guard – Split Central Office').

The journal was published from 1923 until 1941 in Split, to promote strategic orientation of the Kingdom of Yugoslavia to the Adriatic Sea region. Jadranska straža published news, popular science, and literary texts on a variety of subjects. The journal employed rhetoric resembling the style of Italian fascist publications and promoted the country's official ideology of integral Yugoslavism. The journal praised the House of Karađorđević and especially King Alexander, hoping the king would ensure fulfilment of the objectives of the Jadranska straža organisation. The journal remained supportive of the king's role in the national politics even though it would criticise his government at times. In that vein, the journal welcomed king's 1929 proclamation of the 6 January Dictatorship. Ultimately, the association's leadership and the journal became disillusioned and gradually shifted their support to the Croatian Peasant Party. In its final years the publisher and the journal gradually shifted their focus from pan-Yugoslav to regional, Dalmatian and Croatian topics.

== Publisher ==
Jadranska straža journal was published by the Jadranska straža association. It was an association established in Split, then in the Kingdom of Serbs, Croats and Slovenes (later renamed Yugoslavia, present-day Croatia). The organisation's objective was promotion of strategic orientation of the country to the Adriatic Sea area in terms of defence, trade and cultural activities. Jadranska straža intended to form public opinion on the Adriatic Sea as it was essential to the country and defining the nation's identity—attempting to align the objectives with the country's official ideology of integral Yugoslavism. Proponents of the integral Yugoslavism denied the existence of separate ethnic groups of South Slavs living in the country or sought to supersede them by the introduction of a single Yugoslav nation. Since the mid-1930s, the central office of the organisation started shifting its orientation from a pan-Yugoslav one to giving greater emphasis on regional, Dalmatian and Croatian aspects within the organization's purview.

== Editors and style ==
Jadranska straža was published from January 1923 until April 1941. It was normally published once a month (except twice as bi-monthly issues in 1925 and 1938) in Split. Until 1929, the journal's sole editor was Silvije Alfirević. He was joined by Niko Bartulović and Otokar Lahman as co-editors in 1929 and 1930. Živko Vekarić and Jakša Ravlić joined the editing board in 1930 for a year. Both of them and Alfirević quit the role in 1931. Ravlić edited the journal from 1936 until its final issue.

Style and rhetoric of the journal mimicked those of early Italian fascist organisations. While the journal covered national politics, this was normally done in a way meant to glorify the king and the ruling house. The journal paid less attention to actions of the government. While Jadranska straža regularly praised king's political actions, it was critical of the government moves at times. The association leadership and journal editors were split in support to the People's Radical Party and the Democratic Party. While both supported the policy of high centralisation of the state, the former saw the new country as a Greater Serbia. The Democratic Party initially attracted substantial portion of Croat population in the coastal areas, especially in Dalmatia, hoping for king's support to rapid development of the region advocated by Jadranska straža. The failure to fulfil that objective led to a disappointment among many Croats, including the leadership of Jadranska straža. This led the journal to welcome the king's proclamation of the 6 January Dictatorship, viewing abolition of the parliamentary rule as an opportunity to reoirent the country's development to align with the journal's stated objectives. Within few years, Jadranska straža and its publishers were disillusioned regarding the king's intention to reorient the national development strategies regarding the Adriatic and the journal gradually shifted its support to the Croatian Peasant Party. Regardless, the issue published one month following the king's assassination in Marseille in October 1934 was full of articles and poems written in memory of the king.

The journal had the format of 24 by 34 centimetres (9.4 in × 13.4 in). Jadranska straža was sold through subscription. Its circulation was up to 20,000. The journal was published predominantly in Croatian, and the remainder was in Serbian or rarely in Slovene language. Part of the journal was printed in Latin and another part was in the Cyrillic script. The cover alternated between the two scripts every month. Mimicking the practice of other Yugoslav unitarist journals, it was common to apply the ekavian orthography to the Latin script texts, and the ijekavian to the Cyrillic script materials.

== Contents ==
The journal published maritime-related material, including literary texts and scientific papers. It also covered current events, as well as topics related to fishing and tourism. In the first three years of the publication, a significant portion of the journal consisted of reports on establishment of Jadranska straža branches, listing names of organisation's members and donors. The journal had illustrated sections covering diverse maritime-related topics, including a section dedicated to news on the Royal Yugoslav Navy as well as foreign navies. Jadranska straža advocated investments in the Royal Yugoslav Navy, ascribing the navy the key importance for prosperity of the country, equally important to economic development of the littoral. The journal saw the navy as the means of protection against the Italian irredentist territorial claims against the eastern coast of the Adriatic Sea.

Jadranska straža also published book reviews and, following its fourth issue, a section on aeronautical topics. From 1926 to 1928, the journal had a section on maritime traditions, life in coastal areas and the historical development of ships. In the same period, reports on coastal towns and regions started to be published, as well as popular science texts on marine biology, meteorology, and navigation instruments. The journal launched a tourism section following a tourism conference held in Split in January 1927. The section was subtitled Glasnik Saveza za unapređenje turizma Sušak-Split-Dubrovnik (lit. 'Courier of the Alliance for Promotion of Tourism Sušak-Split-Dubrovnik'). The journal published sport news, particularly related to the Gusar Rowing Club, and became the official journal of the rowing sport in Yugoslavia.

In 1928, the journal started to give more space to the publishing of maritime-themed literary works and art. The journal still paid considerable attention to the Royal Yugoslav Navy and the merchant navy, and published articles on the history of coastal towns, especially Split, Dubrovnik, Pelješac Peninsula and the Bay of Kotor. In 1929, additional attention was given to tourism, and an entire issue was dedicated to relations with Czechoslovakia. It covered the issues of trade and tourism, and published several literary works from Czechoslovak authors. Jadranska straža occasionally had a section analysing events in Italy that the editors considered potentially threatening as examples of Italian irredentism. Following the 1930 shipwreck of steamship Daksa, the journal started a section on shipwrecks and maritime accidents. In the early 1930s, the journal expanded the scope of articles on coastal towns to foreign ports written by merchant navy captains. In the same period, the literary section was expanded, often publishing works of Viktor Car Emin, while historian Grga Novak contributed works on Croatian rulers of the coastal areas. In the final years of its publication, as World War II started, the journal included reports on sinking of passenger steamships by the Kriegsmarine, on E-boats, and on the Royal Navy.

== Sources ==
- Lovrić, Mirja (2009). "Prilog poznavanju izdavačke djelatnosti Jadranske straže iz fonda knjižnice Hrvatskoga pomorskog muzeja u Splitu" [Publishing Activities of Jadranska straža as Referred to in the Library Holdings of Maritime Museum in Split]. Kulturna baština (in Croatian) (35). Split: Društvo prijatelja kulturne baštine Split: 355–380. ISSN 0351-0557.
- Machiedo-Mladinić, Norka (1992). "Izgradnja Splita u desetogodišnjem periodu (1918.–1928.)" [The Building of Split During the Decade 1918–1928]. Časopis za suvremenu povijest (in Croatian). 24 (2). Zagreb: Croatian Institute of History: 115–123. ISSN 0590-9597.
- Nielsen, Christian Axboe (2014). Making Yugoslavs: Identity in King Aleksandar's Yugoslavia. Toronto: University of Toronto Press. ISBN 9781442627505.
- Rusinow, Dennison (2003). "The Yugoslav Idea before Yugoslavia". In Djokić, Dejan (ed.). Yugoslavism: Histories of a Failed Idea, 1918-1992. London: C. Hurst & Co. pp. 11–26. ISBN 1-85065-663-0.
- Tchoukarine, Igor (2011). "The Contested Adriatic Sea: The Adriatic Guard and Identity Politics in Interwar Yugoslavia". Austrian History Yearbook. 42. Cambridge: Cambridge University Press: 33–51. doi:10.1017/S0067237811000038. ISSN 1558-5255.
- Tchoukarine, Igor (2019). "To serve the King, the State and the people: the Adriatic Guard's ambiguous position in interwar Yugoslavia". European Review of History. 26 (1). Abingdon-on-Thames: Taylor & Francis: 121–140. doi:10.1080/13507486.2018.1468737. ISSN 1350-7486.
