= European Review of History =

Scholarly journal

The European Review of History (French: Revue européenne d'histoire) is a peer-reviewed history journal. It covers all disciplines, geographic regions, and chronological periods of history, with a focus on the history of the European continent. It is published six times a year.

The journal consists of three parts: Part I is for articles based on original research, part II for historiographical articles, and part III, 'New Horizons', allows more essayist pieces, covering broader questions in current historiography, as well as scholarly dialogues, discussion pieces etc. The Review also allows for a large number of book reviews to be published.

The journal was established in 1993 by the European Association of Young Historians, which was founded by the Association des Jeunes Historiens in France. It originally had two yearly issues.

== See also ==
- List of history journals
