= Donji Dolac =

Coordinates: 43°31′14″N 16°41′58″E

Donji Dolac is a village near Omiš, Croatia. In the 2011 census, it had 373 inhabitants.
