= History of Split =

The city of Split was founded as the Greek colony of Aspálathos (Aσπάλαθος) in the 3rd or 2nd century BC. It became a prominent settlement around 650 CE when it succeeded the ancient capital of the Roman province of Dalmatia, Salona. After the Sack of Salona by the Avars and Slavs, the fortified Palace of Diocletian was settled by the Roman refugees. Split became a Byzantine city, to later gradually drift into the sphere of the Republic of Venice and the Kingdom of Croatia, with the Byzantines retaining nominal suzerainty. For much of the High and Late Middle Ages, Split enjoyed autonomy as a free city, caught in the middle of a struggle between Venice and the King of Hungary for control over the Dalmatian city-states.

Venice eventually prevailed and during the early modern period Split remained a Venetian city, a heavily fortified outpost surrounded by Ottoman territory. Its hinterland was won from the Ottomans in the Morean War of 1699, and in 1797, as Venice fell to Napoleon, the Treaty of Campo Formio rendered the city to the Habsburg monarchy. In 1805, the Peace of Pressburg added it to the Napoleonic Kingdom of Italy and in 1806 it was included in the French Empire, becoming part of the Illyrian Provinces in 1809. After being occupied in 1813, it was eventually granted to the Austrian Empire following the Congress of Vienna, where the city remained a part of the Austrian Kingdom of Dalmatia until the fall of Austria-Hungary in 1918 and the formation of Yugoslavia. In World War II, the city was annexed by Italy, then liberated by the Partisans after the Italian capitulation in 1943. It was then re-occupied by Germany, which granted it to its puppet Independent State of Croatia. The city was liberated again by the Partisans in 1944, and was included in the post-war Socialist Yugoslavia, as part of its republic of Croatia. In 1991, Croatia seceded from Yugoslavia amid the Croatian War of Independence.

== Name ==
The name Aspálathos or Spálathos may come from the spiny broom (Calicotome spinosa, ἀσπάλαθος in Greek), although it is the related Spanish broom (Spartium junceum, σπάρτος) that is common in the area.

After the Roman conquest, the name became Spalatum or Aspalatum in Latin, which in the Middle Ages evolved into Aspalathum, Spalathum, Spalatrum and Spalatro in the Dalmatian language of the city's Romance population. The Venetian name, Spalato, became official under Venetian era, in international usage by the Early Modern Period and is still the name of the city in Italian. From the 10th century onwards, the local use was Spaleto, from where, through a stage *Spəlētu- to *Splětъ, came the South Slavic forms: the ekavian Splet, ijekavian Spljet and ikavian Split. In the 19th century, following the Illyrian movement and its official recognition by the Habsburg Monarchy, the Croatian names Split and Spljet became increasingly prominent, before Split officially replaced Spljet in 1910, by decision of the city council.

== Antiquity ==
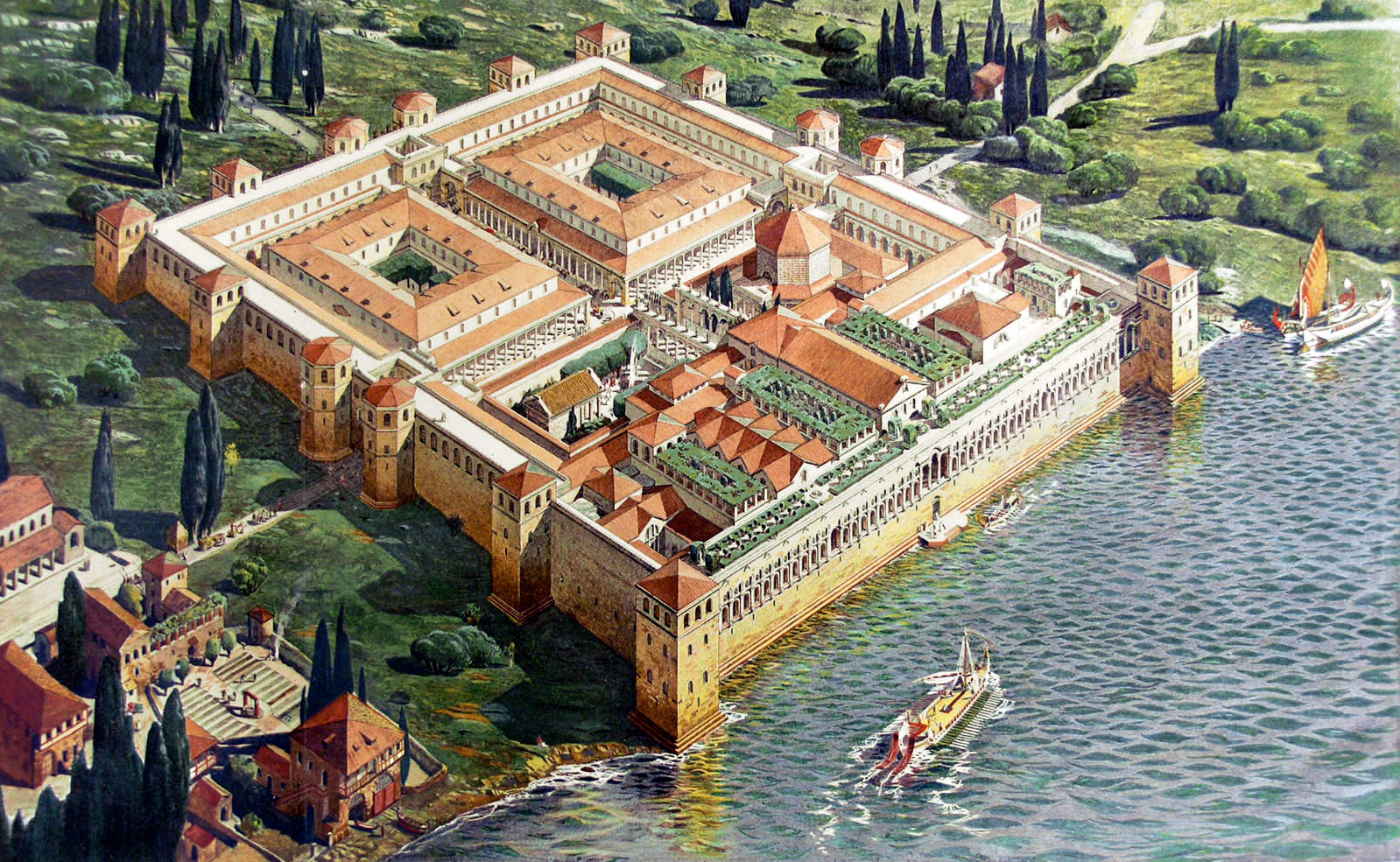
Reconstruction of the Palace of the Roman Emperor Diocletian in its original appearance upon completion in 305 CE, by Ernest Hébrard

Although the beginnings of Split are traditionally associated with the construction of Diocletian's Palace in 305 CE, the city was founded several centuries earlier as the Greek colony of Aspálathos, or Spálathos. It was a colony of the polis of Issa (inhabited by Dorian Greeks), the modern-day town of Vis on the island of the same name. Issa, itself a colony of the Sicilian city of Syracuse, had acquired sovereignty and started founding its own colonies in 367 BCE, after the death of Dionysius the Elder. The exact year the city was founded is not known, but it's estimated to have been in the 3rd or 2nd century BCE.

The Greek settlement lived off trade with the surrounding Illyrian tribes, mostly the Delmatae. In time, the Roman Republic became the dominant power in the region, conquering the Illyrians in the Illyrian Wars of 229 and 219 BCE. Upon establishing permanent rule, the Romans founded the Province of Dalmatia. The city of Salona, only a short distance from Spálathos, became the capital of the province and evolved into a significant city in the Roman state. The history of Spálathos becomes obscure for a while at this point, being overshadowed by that of nearby Salona, to which it would later become successor.

The Roman Emperor Diocletian (ruled 284 to 305 CE) reformed the government in the late Roman Empire and established the Tetrarchy. This new system presupposed that Diocletian himself would retire at some point in favor of Galerius. Thus, in 293 CE, he began the construction of an opulent and heavily fortified palace near his home town of Salona, selecting the site of Spálathos (or Spalatum in Latin). The palace was built directly fronting the sea, so as to allow its occupant to escape by that means if necessary (in an era plagued by civil wars). The site was most likely chosen due to being near to Salona, but also with a secure port and a more immediate access to the open sea in the case of an attack. Following a bout of illness in 303 CE, Diocletian announced he would retire as soon as his Palace, scheduled for completion in 305 CE, was ready.

The Palace was built as a massive structure, much like a Roman military fortress. It faces the sea on its south side, with its walls 170 to 200 metres (570 to 700 ft) long, and 15 to 20 metres (50 to 70 ft) high, enclosing an area of 38,000 m^{2} (9½ acres, or about 5.5 football pitches). The palace water supply was substantial, fed by an aqueduct from the Jadro Spring (9 km away from the city), which supplies the city to this day. The palace and the city of Spalatum which formed its surroundings were at times inhabited by a population as large as 8,000 to 10,000 people. Diocletian established Marjan hill as a recreational area for the residents, a tradition which persists to this day. The palace was finished on schedule in AD 305. Diocletian accordingly retired, becoming the first Roman Emperor to voluntarily remove himself from office. After Diocletian's death, the palace became state property and was used for various purposes. For a period one part of it seems to have been the site of a textile manufactory where Salonitan women worked.

The Palace was to have one further significant occupant, however: Flavius Julius Nepos, the last legitimate Emperor of the Western Roman Empire. By the late 5th century CE, the Western provinces of the Empire fell under the control of various Germanic confederations. Dalmatia (which had been considered a Western province since the reign of Theodosius I) eventually remained the only exception in that regard. From 468 CE, the Province was ruled by Julius Nepos, who was appointed Western Emperor in 473 CE by Leo I of the Eastern Court. He attempted to establish himself in the Western capital of Ravenna (right across the Adriatic from Salona), but was deposed within two years by his Germanic Magister militum, Orestes. He returned to Salona in 475 and took Diocletian's Palace for his residence. Orestes installed his young son Romulus Augustulus as the Emperor in the West, but was murdered within a year (476 CE) by Odoacer and his son deposed. Thereupon Odoacer did not establish his own puppet emperor, but instead returned the Imperial regalia of the West to the Emperor in the East (that now being Emperor Zeno), effectively abolishing the Western Imperial throne. The Eastern Court in Constantinople, however, still recognized Julius Nepos as legitimate Western Emperor. From AD 475, Nepos therefore ruled from Diocletian's Palace as effective "Emperor of Dalmatia". He was however murdered in the Palace by local political enemies in 480 CE, whereupon the two thrones of the Roman Empire were formally united under the Eastern emperors in Constantinople, who now became the sole Roman emperors. The Empire itself is henceforward more commonly referred to in historiography as the Byzantine Empire. In 493 CE Salona, along with most of Dalmatia, was lost to the Ostrogothic Kingdom. However, by 535 CE the Emperor Justinian the Great was ready to attempt a reconquest of Roman lands held by the Ostrogoths. By July of the same year, the Roman general Mundus had quickly overrun Dalmatia and captured Salona. But a large Gothic army arrived to reclaim the province, and though he inflicted a heavy defeat upon them, Mundus himself was mortally wounded. As a result, the Roman army withdrew, and all of Dalmatia, with the exception of Salona, was abandoned to the Goths. Salona was then taken by the Gothic general Gripas. Justinian dispatched a new general, Constantianus, to recover Dalmatia, which he accomplished speedily. Gripas was forced to abandon Salona because of the ruined state of its fortifications and the pro-Roman stance of its citizens. Constantinianus then occupied the city and rebuilt its walls. Seven days later, the Gothic army departed for Italy, so that by late June 536 CE Dalmatia was again in Roman hands.

== Sack of Salona ==
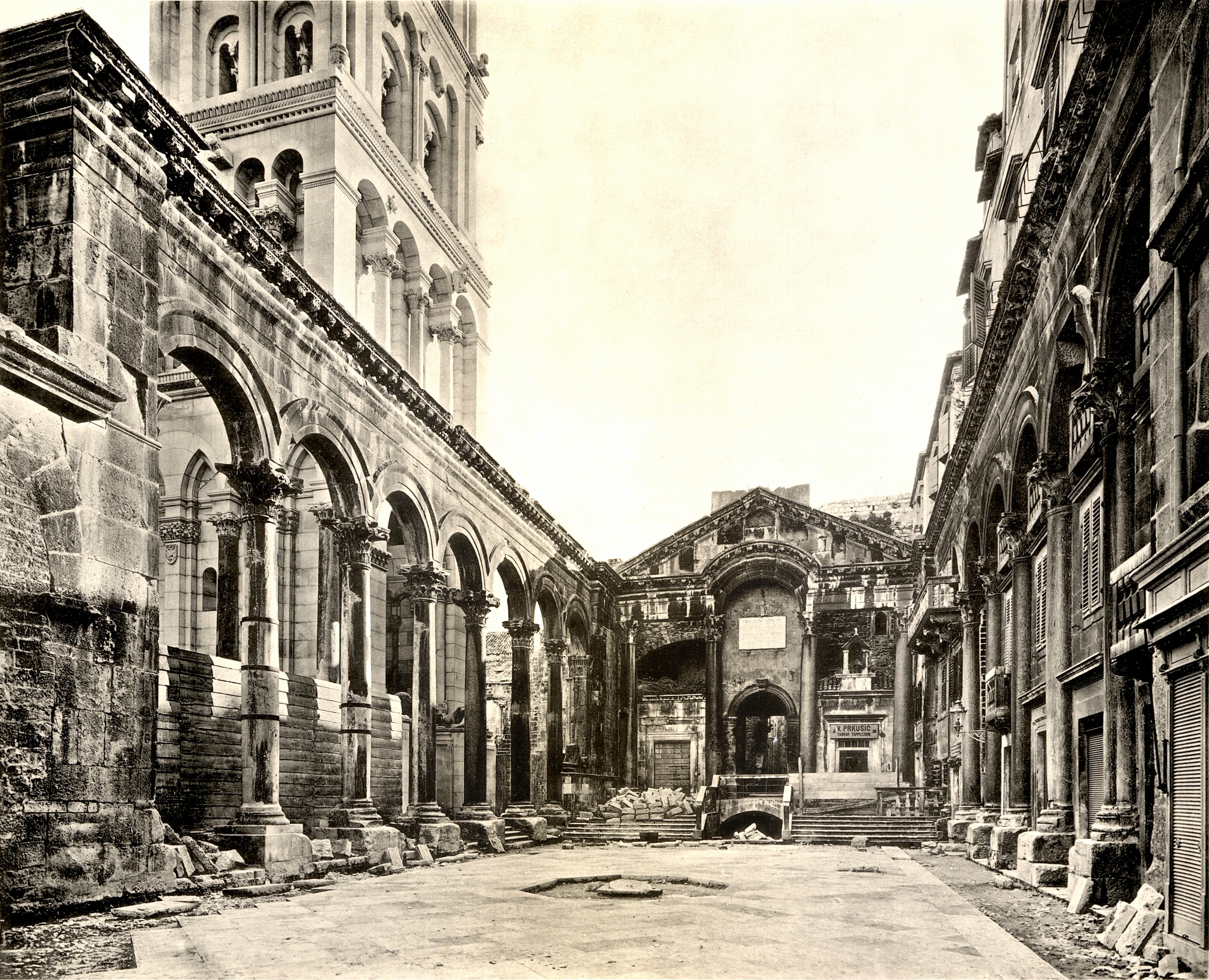
The Peristyle of Diocletian's Palace, collotype (1909).

The history of Split as a significant city, in its own right, begins with the Sack of Salona by the Avars in 639 CE. Conflicting versions of the event are in existence, and it is unknown whether the city was taken by treachery, by ruse, or whether the defense was simply abandoned by the terrified populace. In either case, the city (in spite of its newly rebuilt circuit of walls) fell with little or no resistance, and was thoroughly sacked and destroyed, "so that nothing but the theatre remained standing". The Romans of Salona fled by sea to the nearby Adriatic islands of Solentia (Šolta), Bretia (Brač), Pharia (Hvar), Issa (Vis), and Corcyra Nigra (Korčula). The Avars had ravaged the entire region and expelled or killed most of the Roman population. The Dalmatian region and its shores were at this time settled by tribes of Croats, a South Slavic people subservient to the Avar khagans (the Avars themselves, i.e. the Avar Khaganate, occupied the more fertile land of the Pannonian Basin).

For the following decade, the Salonitans lived in huts on the islands, suffering from a lack of drinking water (the islands themselves appear to have been mostly deserted by that time). The younger men equipped some light ships and raided Croat settlements on the mainland "so that none of the Slavs dared to go down to the sea". At this point there emerged a leader among the exiles, known only as Severus the Great ("whose house had stood next to the columns of the Palace by the sea"). He persuaded the vast majority of the remaining Salonitans to return to the mainland. They could not return to the ruins of Salona, which were entirely indefensible and closer to the Slavic tribes of the interior, but chose instead to occupy the 300-year-old Palace of Diocletian. They intended to stay in the Palace until such a time as Salona might be reoccupied, but this never became possible. The strong fortifications of the palace, along with its placement directly upon the sea, meant that it could not be effectively besieged by the Slavic tribes of the mainland.

The Salonitans occupied the Palace around the year 650 CE. Their numbers were so reduced by this point that the fortress-like structure, which was not built to serve as a city, was sufficient for their needs. Contrary to their expectations of retaking Salona, the citizens were hard-pressed to maintain themselves even in the Palace. Upon hearing of their return, the Croats destroyed their crops and confined them within the gates. The Emperor Constans II intervened at this point, and granted them an Imperial mandate to establish themselves in the Palace as the City of Spalatum, which imposed upon the Slavs a cessation of further hostilities through diplomatic arrangements. The Empire itself at this time was hard-pressed to defend itself against the Caliphate and the Lombards in Italy, but was at the time in fact allied with the Croatian Slavs against the Avars.

The citizens of Spalatum now purged the Temple of Jupiter in Diocletian's Palace and rededicated it to the Virgin Mary. They undertook a dangerous expedition to the overgrown ruins of Salona to recover the remains of the popular Saint Domnius, a one-time Bishop of Salona of Syrian ancestry, executed by order of Emperor Diocletian. They brought the remains to Spalatum in great haste, fearing attack by Slavs, and so brought the remains of the wrong saint. A second expedition was more successful, and the Cathedral of Saint Domnius could now be established with the necessary conditions of sanctity (some have later argued, however, that the remains interred in the cathedral were not in fact those of Saint Domnius). The new see was invested by the Pope with all the authority of the ancient archiepiscopal see of Salona. The Archbishop of Salona retained his status as metropolitan of all Dalmatia, continuing on to be referred to for centuries by the name of the ruined ancient city. In 1100, the bell tower which became the main symbol of the city was constructed and dedicated to Saint Domnius, by then regarded as the patron saint of the city.

== Byzantine period ==
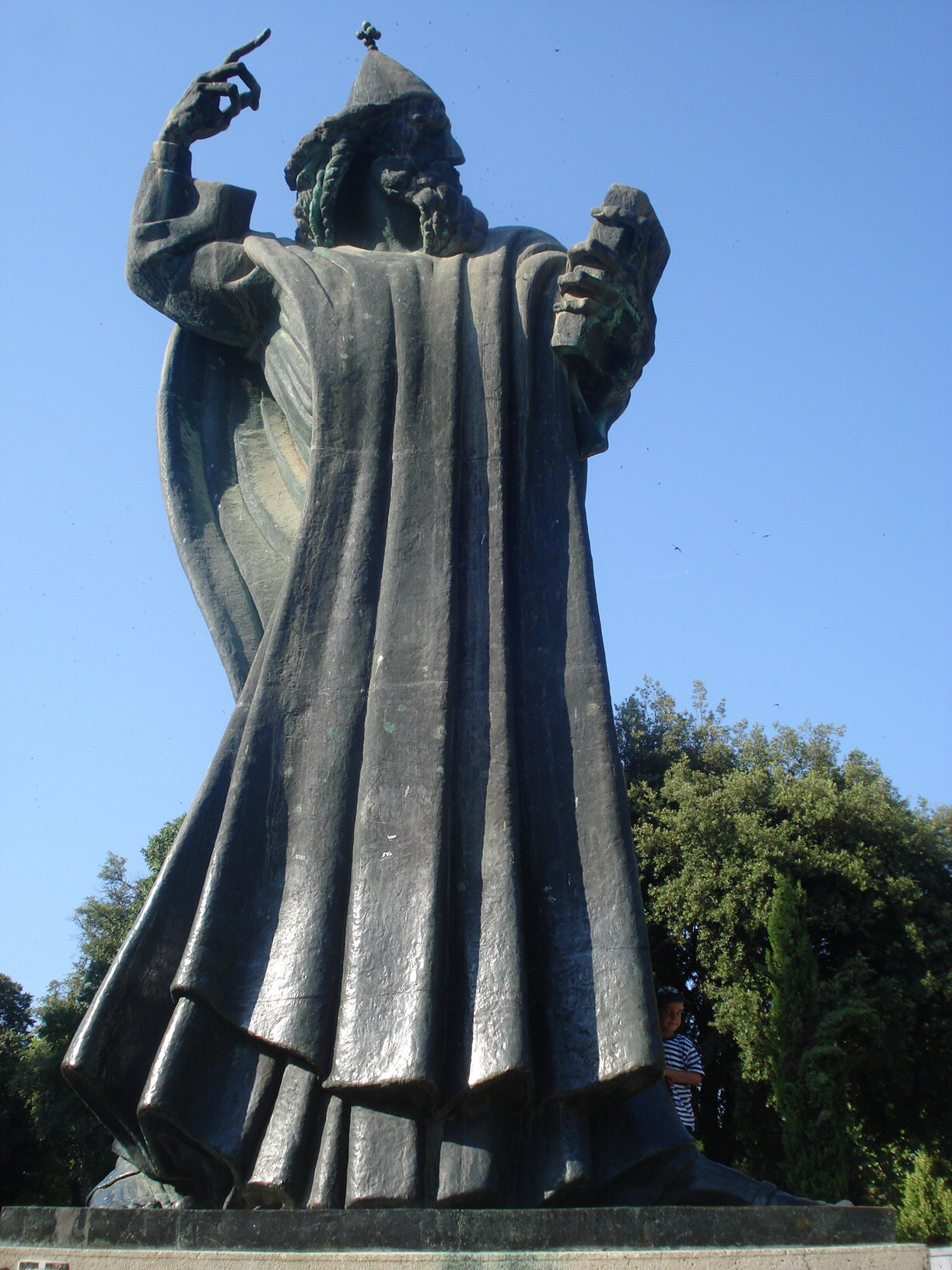
Statue of bishop Gregory of Nin, in the Giardin Park

Throughout the following centuries, effectively until the Fourth Crusade and the Sack of Constantinople, Split remained a de jure possession of the Byzantine Empire. Its hinterland, however, ravaged and desolated by the Avar invasion (from which it never fully recovered), was lost to the Empire beyond much hope of recovery. The region was now home to the Duchy of the Croats. In this period, an independent Dalmatian language developed from Latin, with a distinct local dialect: to its inhabitants, the city became known as Spalatrum or Spalatro.

Dalmatia, or rather the cities, islands, and the immediate coastline, was organized as a Byzantine duchy, administered by the Exarchate of Ravenna. After the final fall of Ravenna to the Lombards in 751, the prefects and fleet fled from Ravenna to the port of Jadera (Zadar), and the Duchy of Dalmatia began to be administered from there. The cities along the coast, however, enjoyed significant privileges and in practice ran their own affairs independently.

In 925, in the hinterland of Spalatro, Tomislav, Duke of the Croats, conquered the Duchy of Pannonia to the north, and the Kingdom of Croatia now emerged in the hinterland of the city. He was an ally of the Byzantine Empire against their common enemy, Simeon I of Bulgaria, and relations with the Empire were cordial. However, contrary to some claims originating in the 19th century, the notion that the King received from the Emperor any powers (the position of Strategos) over Spalatro or other Dalmatian cities, or exercised any authority there, is not supported by historical sources. He did receive from the Emperor Romanus I Lecapenus the title of "proconsul", but this was an honorific with no function attached to it.

Tomislav had his seat at Nin, on the northern Dalmatian coast (relatively near to Zadar), and the bishops of Nin (also known as "bishops of the Croats") gained jurisdiction and influence over the Church in Croatian territories, at the expense of the Archbishopric in Spalatro. The Bishopric of Nin, headed by Bishop Gregory, attempted to institute the "Slavonic" or "Slavic language" as the language of religious service in the Croatian realm. In response to these developments, in 925 a significant synod was held in Split, at which it was decreed that "no one should presume to celebrate the divine mysteries in the Slavonic language, but only in Latin and Greek, and that no one of that tongue should be advanced to the holy orders". Further, the Archbishop of Spalatum was reaffirmed as having jurisdiction over Croatian lands.

Medieval overlords
of Split, 998–1420

| Hungary |
| Venice |
| Byzantium |
| Bosnia |
| Counts of Bribir |

Throughout the 9th and 10th centuries, the waters of the Adriatic were the theatre of a naval struggle between the Narentines (a South Slavic confederation recognizing the King of Croatia as their sovereign) and the Venetian Republic, with the Narentines long holding the upper hand and at one point raiding Venice itself. Split was constantly subjected to raids from both the Narentines on the sea, and by the Croats in its immediate hinterland. Therefore, the city offered its allegiance to Venice in exchange for the Doge establishing security. In 998 the Venetian Doge Pietro II Orseolo, led a large naval expedition along the eastern shores of the Adriatic. He arrived in Split and was welcomed by the population, with the city immediately allying itself to him and providing naval assistance. He defeated the Narentines the same year, and the cities of Dalmatia offered to pledge their allegiance to the Doge and his successors. After obtaining permission from Emperor Basil II in Constantinople, Orseolo proclaimed himself Duke of Dalmatia.

In 1014 the First Bulgarian Empire was destroyed by Basil II, and in 1019 the Byzantine Empire restored direct control over Dalmatia. The title "Duke of Dalmatia" seems to have been dropped at this point by the Venetian doges. In 1069 Peter Krešimir IV, King of Croatia, gained control over Dalmatian islands and cities, including Split, and stretched his rule south to Neretva. The coastal cities retained autonomous administration and were still nominally under Byzantine Empire, but were now subjects of the Croatian king. By 1084 Imperial influence was waning again. Emperor Alexius I Comnenus conferred once more the title of "Duke of Dalmatia" to the Venetian Doge (his nominal vassal). The Venetians had rendered invaluable naval assistance to the Empire in the Byzantine–Norman wars, while the last King of Croatia, Demetrius Zvonimir, had offended the Emperor by seeking investiture from the Pope and not the Patriarch of Constantinople (as was the case with his immediate predecessors). However, it was merely a title since Dalmatian coastal cities remained under control of King Zvonimir.

After the death of Croatian King Stephen II in 1091, a period of succession crisis followed in Croatia, with King Ladislaus I of Hungary interfering in it. Byzantine Emperor Alexius took advantage of this and joined the old Theme of Dalmatia to the Empire. In 1096 Emperor Alexius, at the time engaged in the First Crusade, granted the administration of Dalmatia to the Doge of Venice.

== Struggle for Dalmatia ==
Split was now a subject of the Venetian Doge, and was, along with Trogir and Zadar, one of the three (major) cities of Dalmatia. At this time the Kingdom of Hungary arrived on the scene. King Coloman had by 1097 conquered the Kingdom of Croatia in the Dalmatian hinterland, and after a failed Croat rebellion in 1102, crowned himself "King of Croatia and Dalmatia" at Biograd, the coastal town that served as the traditional seat of the Croatian monarchy. The neutrality of Venice in these events was acquired by assurances that the Hungarian kings would respect Venetian rule in Split and the other coastal cities. Hungarians and the Venetians now sailed against the Duchy of Apulia in a joint expedition to end Norman incursions into the Adriatic, in which they were successful. After this, however, it was no longer in Coloman's interest to maintain his Venetian alliance, and, in 1105, when the Venetians under Doge Ordelafo Faliero de Doni were engaged in Syria and Acre, Coloman laid siege to Zadar and took it by assault, whereupon he advanced on Split. The citizens of Split, seeing the appearance of "an army of unknown race" were "disposed to fight", but "finding that the men were Christians and that the King was disposed to deal liberally with them", they surrendered upon guarantee of their ancient privileges. Nearby Trogir (at that time the primary rival of Split), did the same.

The rights granted to the city (and reaffirmed by new charters) were substantial. Split was to pay no tribute, it was to choose its own count and archbishop whom the king would confirm, it preserved its old Roman laws, and appointed its own judge. Dues from trade (which were substantial in the period), were divided between the count, the archbishop, and the king, and no foreigner was to live within the walls of the city against the will of the citizens. These rights were generally upheld by Hungarian kings, but there were inevitable incidents of violation. The new Hungarian Archbishop of Split, Manasses, attempted to take control of the city with the aid of the Hungarian garrison (whose presence was in itself a violation of privilege). Headed by Adriano de Treviso, the Count of Split, the citizens rose up, and, with the help of a contingent from Trogir, massacred the garrison and expelled the Archbishop. Some years later, one Reles, referred to as the Duke of Croatia, attempted to gain control over the city by inducing the citizens to elect him their Count, but the citizens refused "out of detestation of being ruled by a Slav". When Reles ravaged their lands the citizens defeated him in battle and killed him.

King Coloman died in 1116, ten years after his conquest, while the Doge Ordelafo Faliero had in the meantime returned from Outremer. In a comprehensive campaign along the coast, the Doge retook all the Dalmatian cities, and also, for the first time, the Croatian cities of coast such as Biograd and Šibenik. In 1117, however, he was defeated and killed in renewed battle with the Hungarians under Stephen II of Hungary, and Split again acknowledged Hungarian rule. But the new Doge, Domenico Michele, quickly defeated the Hungarians again and restored Venetian authority by 1118. In 1124, while the Doge was engaged against the Byzantine Empire (now hostile to Venice), Stephen II recovered Split and Trogir without resistance. Upon Michele's return in 1127, however, the Doge yet again expelled the Hungarians from the two cities and utterly destroyed Biograd, the favored seat of the Croatian Kings that the Hungarians were attempting to establish as a rival to the Venetian Zadar.

The cities remained in Venetian hands without contest during the reign of Béla II. But in 1141, his successor, King Géza II of Hungary, having conquered Bosnian lands, marched to Split and Trogir, both voluntarily accepting him as overlord. This turned out to be a definitive conquest, as Venetian rule was not to return to Split for another 186 years. His son Stephen III then retook Šibenik, which had become a large and wealthy town due to the influx of refugees from the ruined Biograd. Šibenik was at this time chartered by the King and became counted among the "Dalmatian" cities. In 1145 the episcopal see of Zadar became raised to metropolitan rank by Pope Anastasius IV, to avoid submission to the now-Hungarian Archbishopric of Salona at Split (a distinction which remains to this day, with the Archdiocese of Zadar being subject directly to the Holy See).

In that period, however, Split was to see one brief (and final) restoration of Imperial power in Dalmatia. The Byzantine Emperor Manuel I Comnenus began his campaigns against the Kingdom of Hungary in 1151, and by 1164, had secured the submission of the Dalmatian cities back under Imperial rule. Having won a decisive victory against Hungary in 1167 at the Battle of Sirmium, consolidating his gains, the Emperor suddenly broke with Venice as well, and sent a fleet of 150 ships to the Adriatic. Split was to remain in Byzantine hands until Manuel's death in 1180, when Béla III of Hungary moved to restore Hungarian power in Dalmatia. The city remained loyal to the Empire, resisting the re-establishment of Hungarian rule, and consequently, upon its inevitable submission, was punished with the King's refusal to renew its ancient privileges. In that year Rainiero, the Archbishop of Split, attempted to regain Church farmlands on Mount Massarus (Mosor) from Croats who occupied them, and was stoned to death by the locals.

During the 20-year Hungarian civil war between King Sigismund and the Capetian House of Anjou of the Kingdom of Naples, the losing contender, Ladislaus of Naples, sold his disputed rights on Dalmatia to the Venetian Republic for 100,000 ducats. Acting on the pretext, the Republic took over in the city by the year 1420.

== Venetian period ==
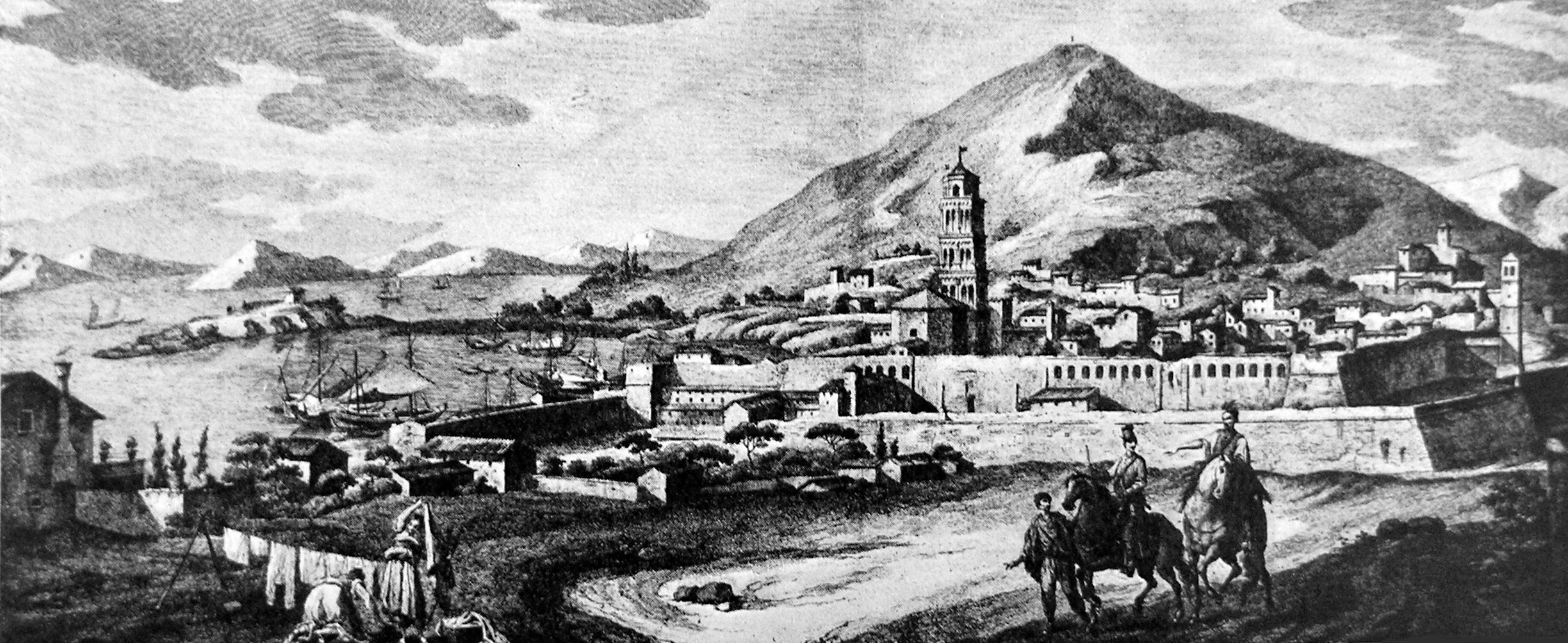
Overall view of Split in the Early modern period (1764), an engraving by Scottish architect Robert Adam. Marjan hill is visible in the background.

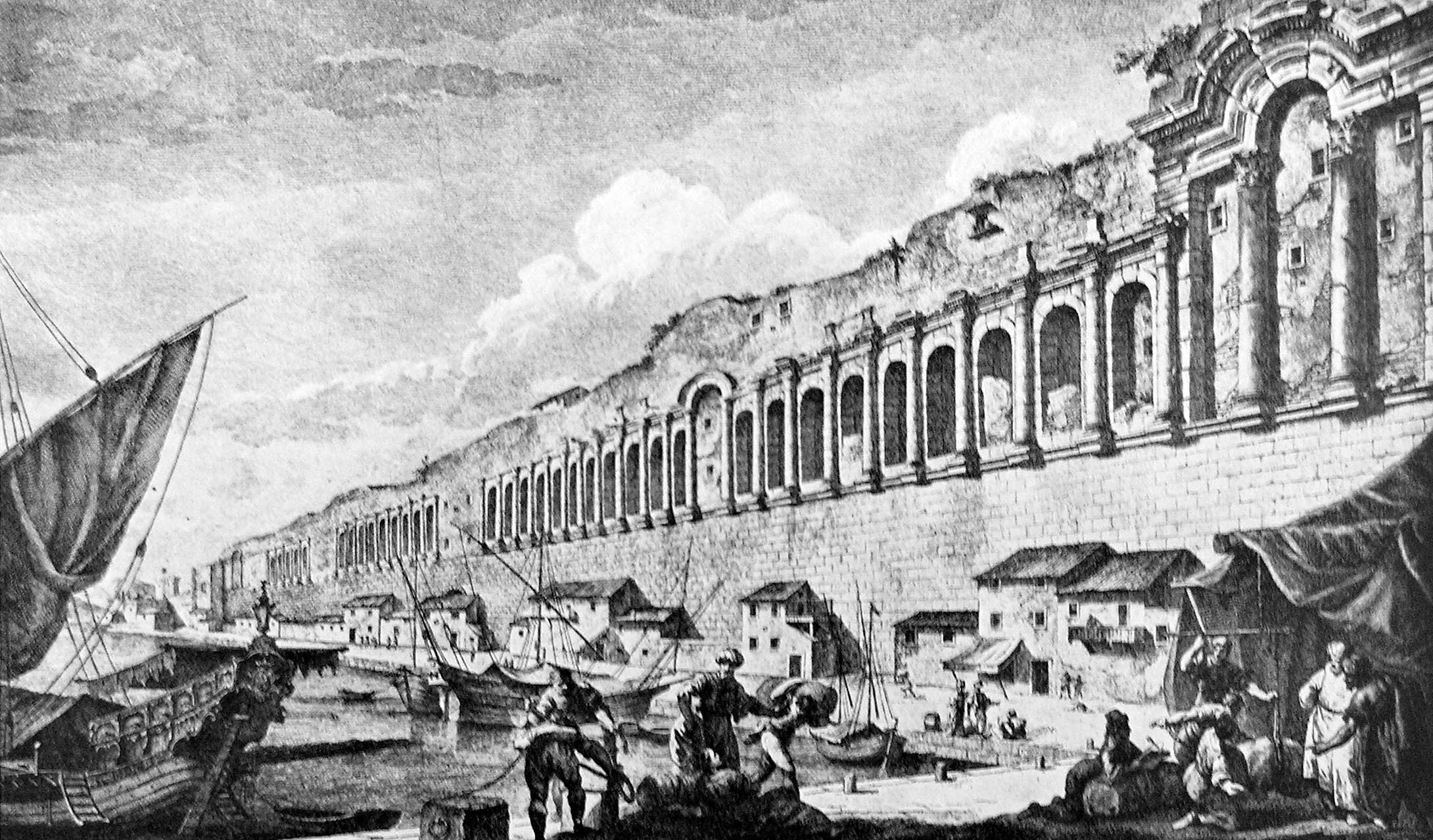
The city's seaward walls in 1764, an engraving by Robert Adam.

By this time the population was largely Croatian, while Romance Dalmatian names were not as common, according to the medieval city archives. The common language was Croatian, but Italian (a mixture of Tuscan and Venetian dialects) was also spoken due to Italian notaries, school teachers and merchants. The city's autonomy was greatly reduced: the highest authority was a prince and captain (conte e capitanio), assigned by Venice.

Split eventually developed into a significant port-city, with important trade routes to the Ottoman-held interior through the nearby Klis pass. Culture flourished as well, Split being the hometown of Marko Marulić, a classic Croatian author. Marulić's most acclaimed work, Judita (1501), was an epic poem about Judith and Holfernes, widely held to be the first modern work of Croatian literature. It was written in Split and printed in Venice in 1521. The advances and achievements were reserved mostly for the aristocracy: the illiteracy rate was extremely high, mostly because Venetian rule showed little interest in educational and medical facilities.

In the latter half of the 16th century, Daniel Rodriga, a Jewish merchant, worked tirelessly to persuade Venetian authorities to establish Split as a key point on a new trade route connecting Venice with the Ottoman Empire. After securing approval in 1581, he moved to Split to oversee the construction of a "scala," or stopover complex, but due to financial difficulties and the death of his stonemason, the project stalled. Ultimately, the Venetian government resumed the project, re-engaging with Rodriga, and completed it in 1592, transforming it into a state-owned venture critical to regional trade.

In 1797 Split was ceded to the Habsburg monarchy by the Treaty of Campo Formio, ending 377 years of Venetian rule in the city.

== Napoleonic wars ==
Split became part of the Napoleonic Kingdom of Italy in 1805, after the defeat of the Third Coalition at the Battle of Austerlitz and the consequent Treaty of Pressburg. It was included directly in the French Empire in 1806. The same year, Vincenzo Dandolo was named provveditore generale and general Auguste de Marmont was named military commander of Dalmatia.

In 1809, after a brief war with France, Austria ceded Carinthia, Carniola, Croatia west of the Sava River, Gorizia and Trieste to France. These territories, along with Dalmatia, formed the Illyrian Provinces. During this period, large investments were undertaken in the city, new streets were built and parts of the ancient fortifications were removed.

In late 1813 Austrian forces moved into Illyrian Provinces, they were supported by Royal Naval frigate squadrons led by Rear-Admiral Thomas Fremantle, who at the same made a sweep against the Dalmatian coast. At Split, Captain William Hoste in HMS Bacchante coordinated with Austrian ground troops and the 35th Regiment of Foot which took the city in November against little resistance from the French. The capture allowed Hoste and his forces to seize the nearby islands of Hvar and Brač. Following the Congress of Vienna in 1815, the city was officially ceded to Austria.

== Under Habsburg rule ==
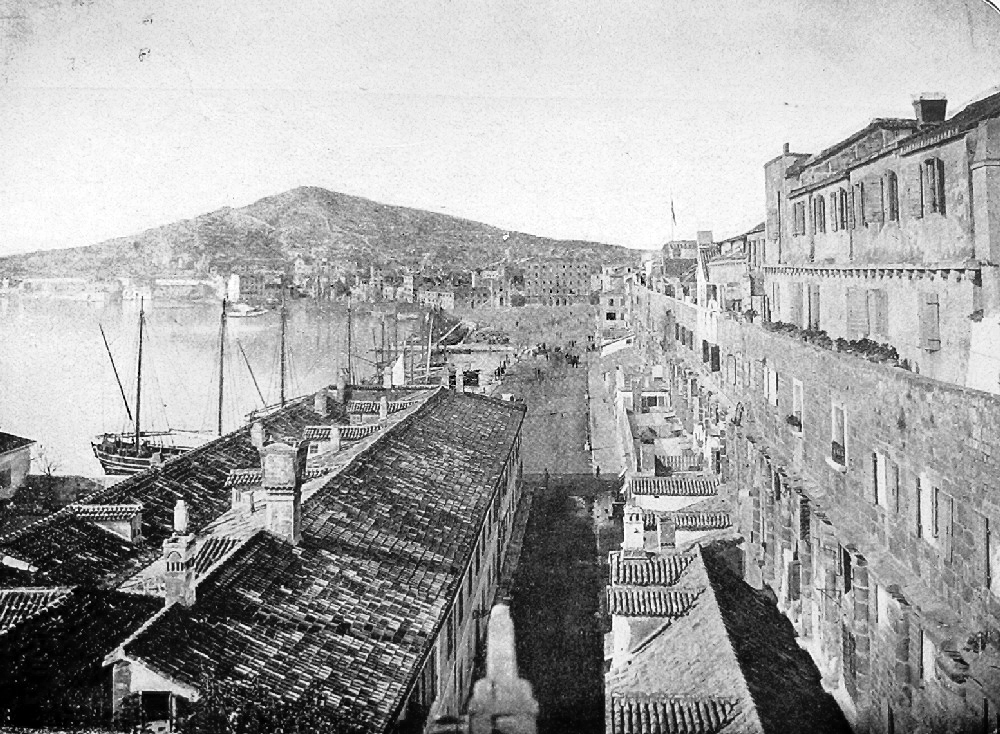
The Riva of Split in the 19th century, with Marjan hill in the background.

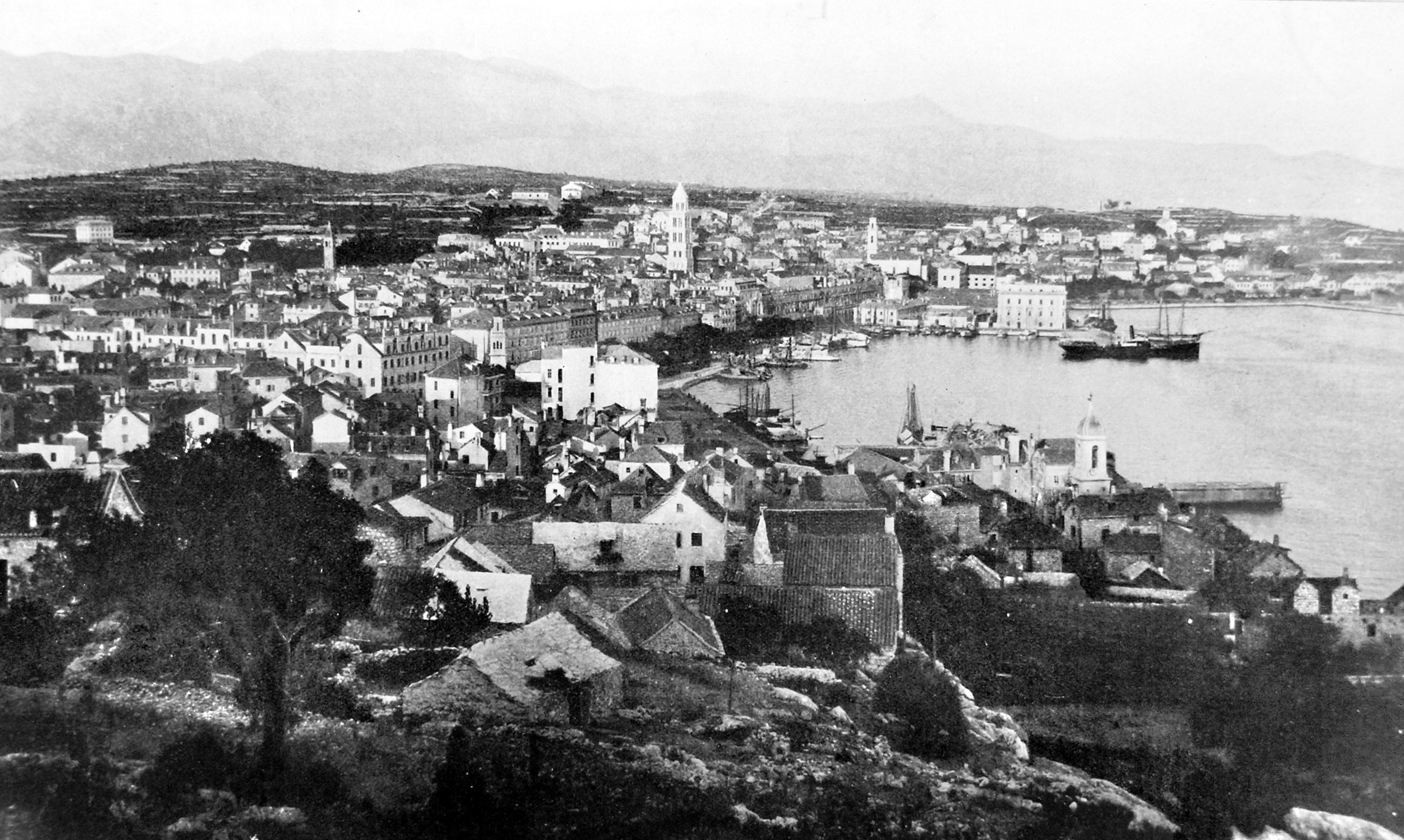
City center and the Riva promenade from the slopes of Marjan in 1910.

The Split region became part of the Kingdom of Dalmatia, a separate administrative unit. After the revolutions of 1848 as a result of the romantic nationalism, two factions appeared. One was the pro-Croatian Unionist faction (later called the "Puntari", "Pointers"), led by the People's Party and, to a lesser extent, the Party of Rights, both of which advocated the union of Dalmatia with the Kingdom of Croatia-Slavonia which was under Hungarian administration. This faction was strongest in Split, and used it as its headquarters. The other faction was the pro-Italian Autonomist faction (also known as the "Irredentist" faction), whose political goals varied from autonomy within the Austro-Hungarian Empire, to a political union with the Kingdom of Italy.

The political alliances in Split shifted over time. At first, the Unionists and Autonomists were allied against the centralism of Vienna. After a while, when the national question came to prominence, they separated. Under Austria, however, Split can generally be said to have stagnated. The great upheavals in Europe in 1848 gained no ground in Split, and the city did not rebel.

Antonio Bajamonti became Mayor of Split in 1860 and – except for a brief interruption during the period 1864–65 – held the post for over two decades until 1880. Bajamonti was also a member of the Dalmatian Sabor (1861–91) and the Austrian Chamber of Deputies (1867–70 and 1873–79). In 1882 the Bajamonti's party lost the elections and Dujam Rendić-Miočević, a prominent city lawyer, was elected to the post.

== As part of Yugoslavia ==
=== Kingdom of Yugoslavia ===
After the end of World War I and the dissolution of Austria-Hungary, the province of Dalmatia, along with Split, became a part of the Kingdom of Serbs, Croats and Slovenes. Split was the site of a series of incidents between 1918 and 1920.

Since Rijeka, Trieste and Zadar, the three other large cities on the eastern Adriatic coast, were annexed by Italy, Split became the most important port in the Kingdom. The Lika railway, connecting Split to the rest of the country, was completed in 1925.

The country changed its name to the Kingdom of Yugoslavia in 1929, and the Port of Split became the seat of new administrative unit, Littoral Banovina. After the Cvetković-Maček agreement, Split became the part of new administrative unit (merging of Sava and Littoral Banovina plus some Croat populated areas), Banovina of Croatia in the Kingdom of Yugoslavia.

=== World War II ===
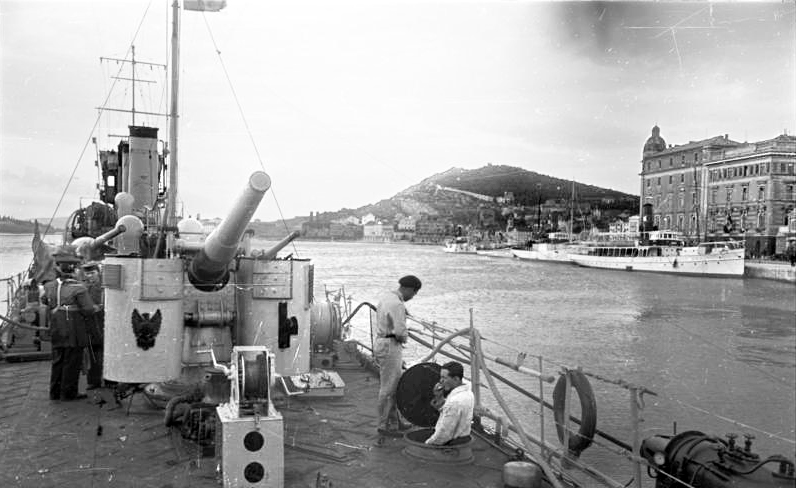
Italian warship in the City Harbour after the annexation into Italy in 1941.

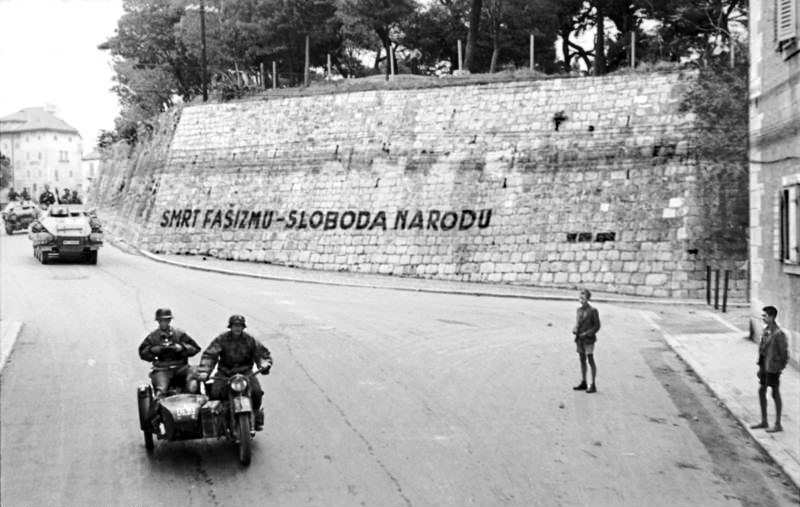
German vehicles in the city streets. The sign reads "Death to fascism – freedom to the people".

In April 1941, following the invasion of Yugoslavia by Nazi Germany, Split was occupied by Italy. Although Split formally became part of the Independent State of Croatia, the Ustaše were not able to establish and strengthen their rule in Split, as Italians assumed all power in Dalmatia. One month later on 18 May 1941, when the Treaties of Rome were signed, Italy formally annexed Split, which was included in the province of Spalato, and large parts of Dalmatia down to Kotor. The Italian Governatorate of Dalmatia hosted 390,000 inhabitants, of which 280,000 Croats, 90,000 Serbs and 5,000 Dalmatian Italians. Italian rule met heavy opposition from the Croat population as Split became a centre of anti-fascist sentiment in Yugoslavia. The first armed resistance group was organized on 7 May 1941; the 63 member strong 1st Strike Detachment (Prvi udarni odred) served as the basis for future formations, including the 1st Split Partisan Detachment. Between September and October 1941 alone, ten officials of the Italian fascist occupation were assassinated by the citizens. On 12 June 1942, a fascist mob attacked the city's synagogue, and destroyed its library and archive. Worshipers were beaten as they left the synagogue and Jewish-owned shops were targeted the following day. The local football clubs refused to compete in the Italian championship; HNK Hajduk and RNK Split suspended their activities and both joined the Partisans along with their entire staff after the Italian capitulation provided the opportunity. Soon after Hajduk became the official football club of the Partisan movement.

In September 1943, following the capitulation of Italy, the city was temporarily controlled by Tito's brigades with thousands of people volunteering to join the Partisans of Marshal Josip Broz Tito (a third of the total population, according to some sources). 8,000 Italian soldiers from the 15th Infantry Division Bergamo prepared to fight alongside the Yugoslav Partisans against the Waffen SS Prinz Eugen. The Italian General Becuzzi handed over to the Partisans 11 soldiers which they considered as "war criminals; the Partisans also executed up to 41 members of the Italian Police forces, later found in mass graves.

A few weeks later, however, the Partisans were forced into retreat as the Wehrmacht placed the city under the authority of the Independent State of Croatia. The Germans decimated the Italian soldiers as traitors, including three Generals (Policardi, Pelligra and Cigala Fulgosi) and 48 officials (Trelj massacre). In this period the last remaining symbols of Italian heritage in Split, including several Venetian Lions of St.Mark, were erased from the town.

In a tragic turn of events, besides being bombed by axis forces, the city was also bombed by the Allies, causing hundreds of deaths. Partisans finally captured the city on 26 October 1944 and instituted it as the provisional capital of Croatia. On 10 November the formal surrender of German forces in the Split area was hosted aboard the British cruiser Delhi. Three months later the Kriegsmarine conducted a daring raid on the Split harbour, damaging Delhi.

After the war the remaining members of Dalmatian Italians of Split left Yugoslavia towards Italy (Istrian-Dalmatian exodus).

Second Occupation
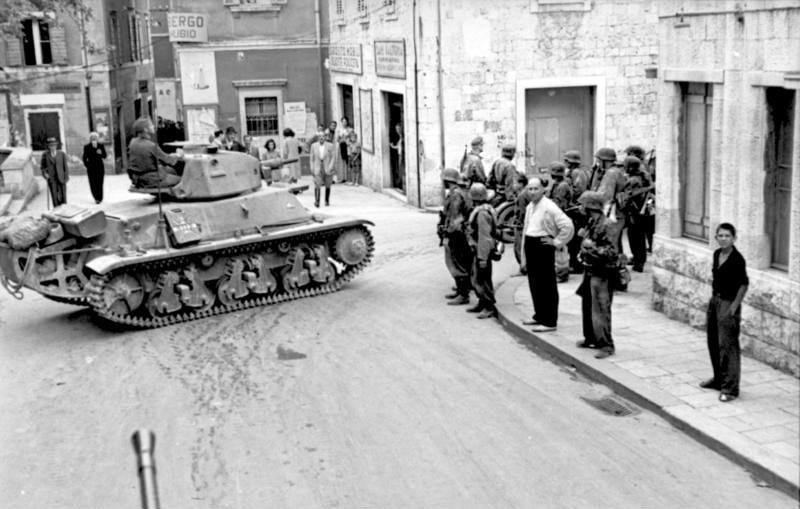
A French-built Hotchkiss H38 tank (captured by the Germans after 1940), passes through the streets of the city center.

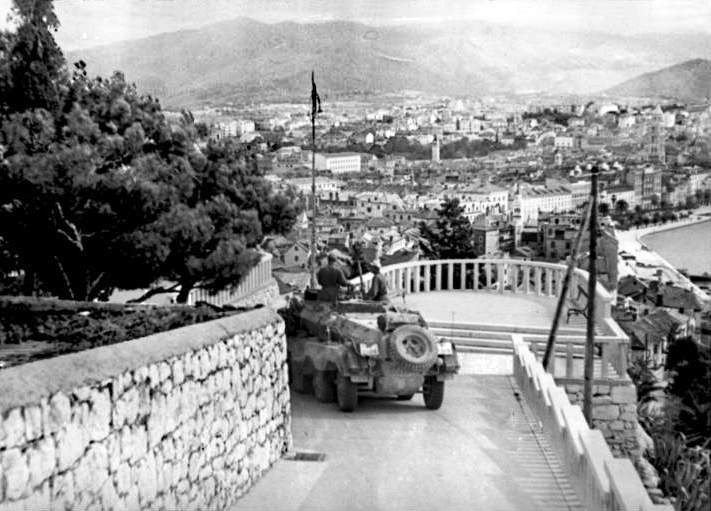
German Panzerspähwagen Sd.Kfz. 231 armoured car descending from Marjan Hill, with the city in the background.

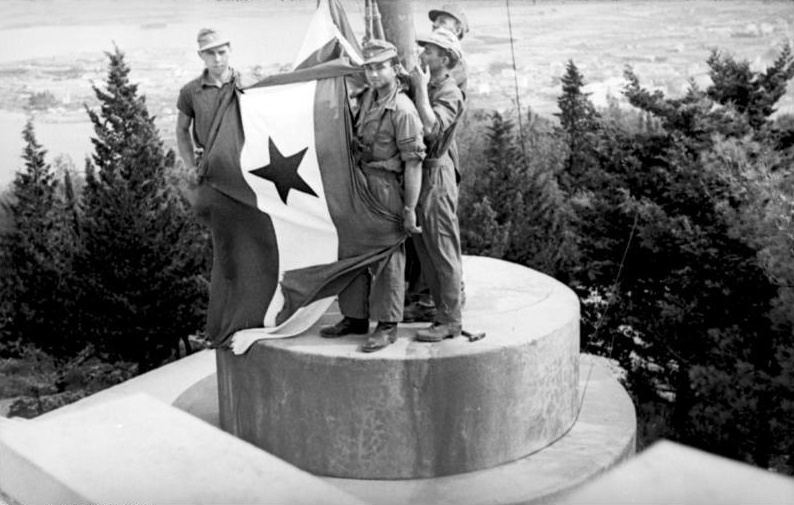
German troops lowering the Yugoslav flag from Marjan

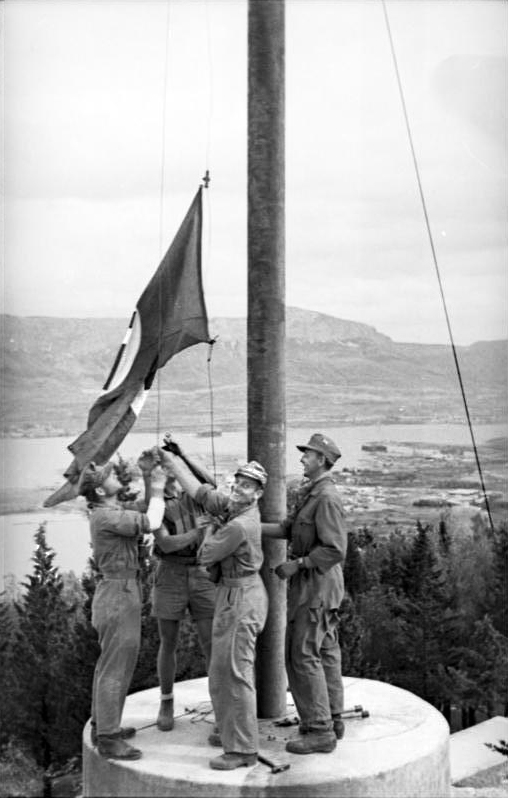
Germans raising the flag of Nazi Germany over Split

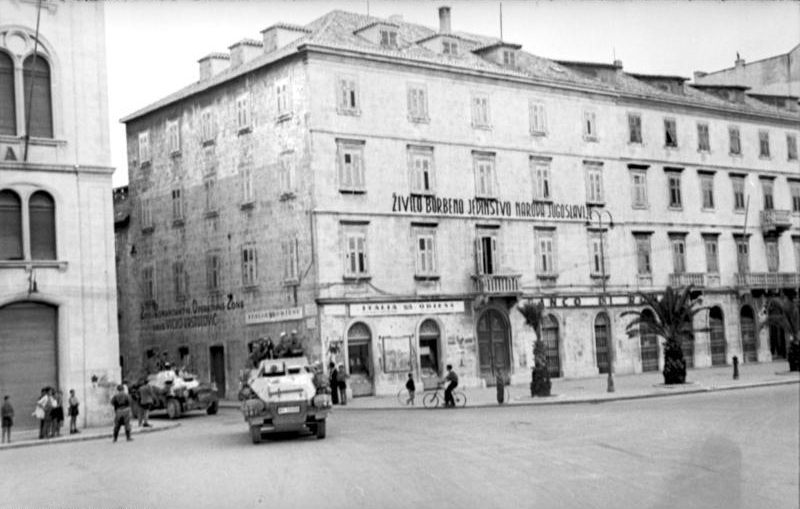
German troops on the Riva promenade. The signs read "Long live the IV. Operational Zone Commander, Comrade Vicko Krstulović", and "Long live the fighting unity of the Yugoslav nations"

=== Federal Yugoslavia ===
The Yugoslav-era Coat of arms of Split. Introduced in 1967, it was based on the Medieval rectangular arms, dating at least from the 14th century (and likely much earlier).

After World War II, Split became a part of the Socialist Republic of Croatia, itself a constituent sovereign republic of the Socialist Federal Republic of Yugoslavia. During the period the city experienced its largest economic and demographic boom. Dozens of new factories and companies were founded with the city population tripling during the period. The city became the economic centre of an area exceeding the borders of Croatia and was flooded by waves of rural migrants from the undeveloped hinterland who found employment in the newly established industry, as part of large-scale industrialization and investment by the Yugoslav Federal Government.

The shipbuilding industry was particularly successful and Yugoslavia, with its Croatian shipyards, became one of the world's top nations in the field. Many recreational facilities were also constructed with federal funding, especially for the 1979 Mediterranean Games, such as the Poljud Stadium. The city also became the largest passenger and military port in Yugoslavia, housing the headquarters of the Yugoslav Navy (Jugoslavenska ratna mornarica, JRM) and the Army's Coastal Military District (equivalent of a field army). In the period between 1945 and 1990, the city was transformed and expanded, taking up the vast majority of the Split peninsula. In the same period it achieved an as yet unsurpassed GDP and employment level, still above the present day's, growing into a significant Yugoslav city.

== Since independence ==
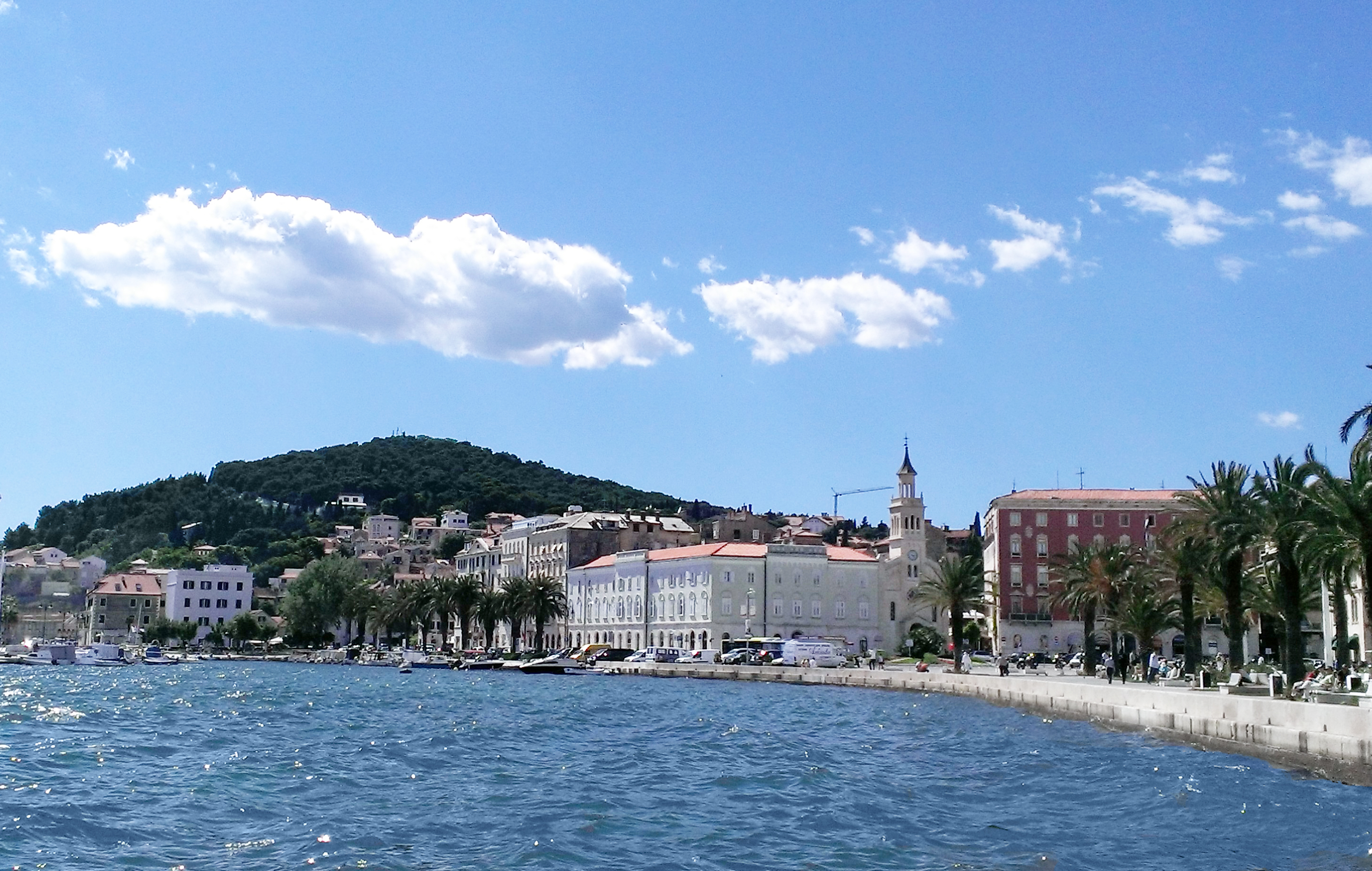
Marjan hill as seen from the Riva Promenade, 2013.

When Croatia declared its independence again in 1991, Split had a large garrison of JNA troops (drafted from all over Yugoslavia), as well as the headquarters and facilities of the Yugoslav War Navy (JRM). This led to a tense months-long stand-off between the JNA and Croatian National Guard and police forces, occasionally flaring up in various incidents. The most tragic such incident occurred on 15 November 1991, when the JRM light frigate Split fired a small number of shells at the city and its surroundings. At least two civilians employed by Jadrolinija were killed in the JNA attack on Split, with six other people injured. Three general locations were bombarded: the old city center, the city airport and an uninhabited part of the hills above Kaštela, between the airport and Split. JRM Sailors who had refused to attack Croat civilians, most of them Croats themselves, were left in the vessel's brig. The JNA and JRM evacuated all of its facilities in Split during January 1992. The 1990s economic recession soon followed.

In the years following 2000, Split finally gained momentum and started to develop again, with a focus on tourism. From being just a transition centre, Split is now a major Croatian tourist destination. Many new hotels are being built, as well as new apartment and office buildings. Many large development projects are revived, and new infrastructure is being built. An example of the latest large city projects is the Spaladium Arena, built in 2009.

== See also ==
- Timeline of Split
- History of Dalmatia
- History of Croatia
