= Timeline of Split =

Coordinates: 43°30′N 16°26′E

The following is a timeline of the history of the city of Split, Croatia.

== Prior to the 19th century ==
Medieval overlords
of Split, 998-1420

Hungary and Croatia
Venice
Byzantium
Croatia
Bosnia
Counts of Bribir

- 3rd or 2nd C. BCE – Split founded as a colony of Issa
- 78 BCE – Salona taken by Romans.
- 310 CE – Diocletian's Palace built near Salona.
- 4th C. CE – Diocletianus Aqueduct constructed.
- 639 – Salona sacked by Avars; refugees settle at nearby Spalatum.
- 998 – Venetian Doge Pietro Orseolo is granted the title of "Duke of Dalmatia" by the Emperor Basil II (Venice is a nominal vassal of the Byzantine Emperors).
- 1019 – First Bulgarian Empire destroyed, direct Byzantine rule restored to Split by Basil II (Venice stops using the title "Duke of Dalmatia").
- 1069 – Split acknowledges nominal suzerainty of Croatian King Peter Krešimir IV.
- 1084 – The title of "Duke of Dalmatia" granted once more to Venetian doges by Emperor Alexius I Comnenus, but the town remains under overlordship of King Demetrius Zvonimir.
- 1091 – Byzantine Emperor Alexius joins the old Theme of Dalmatia to the Empire.
- 1096 – Emperor Alexius grants the administration of Dalmatia to the Doge of Venice.
- 1100 – Bell tower of the Cathedral of Saint Domnius constructed.
- 1105 – Split surrenders to King Coloman of Hungary.
- 1116 – Venetian Doge Ordelafo Faliero de Doni retakes the city from Hungary.
- 1117 – Ordelafo Faliero is defeated and falls in battle with the Hungarians, city submits to Hungary.
- 1118 – Doge Domenico Michele defeats Stephen II of Hungary and re-establishes Venetian sovereignty
- 1124 – While Domenico Michele is engaged in battle with Byzantium, Stephen II retakes Split and the other Dalmatian cities.
- 1125 – Doge Domenico Michele returns and retakes Split and the Dalmatian cities.
- 1141 – Géza II of Hungary conquers Bosnian lands and re-establishes Hungarian rule in the city.
- 1171 – Emperor Manuel I Comnenus of the Byzantine Empire restores Imperial control in Split for the last time.
- 1180 – Death of Manuel I, Hungary re-assumes sovereignty.
- 1241 – City unsuccessfully besieged by Tartar forces.
- 1244 – King Bela IV transfers the election of Dalmatian city governors, that were previously done by cities themselves, to the Ban of Croatia.
- 1327 – Venice reclaims the city.
- 1357 – Venetian forces expelled from Split, Hungary back in power.
- 1390 – Tvrtko I of Bosnia in power.
- 1391 – Death of Tvrtko I, Split returns to Hungarian overlordship.
- 1420 – City becomes a possession of Venice, and remains under Venetian rule for the following 377 years.
- 1432 – Loggia built.
- 1481 – Hrvoja Tower built.
- 1670 – An outer ring of modern walls is built.
- 1797 – Split ceded to the Habsburg monarchy by the Treaty of Campo Formio.

== 19th century ==
- 1805 – After the defeat of the Third Coalition and the consequent Treaty of Pressburg, Split becomes part of the Kingdom of Italy.
- 1806 – Split becomes part of the French Empire.
- 1809 – Illyrian Provinces established.
- 1813 – Split occupied by Austria.
- 1815 – Split officially ceded to Austria following the Congress of Vienna.
- 1820 Split Archaeological Museum, oldest museum in Croatia, established by a decree of the Dalmatian government.
- 1830 – Catholic diocese of Spalato-Macarsca established.
- 1851 – Population: 10,787.
- 1860 – Antonio Bajamonti of the Autonomist Party becomes mayor.
- 1864 – Bajamonti relieved of duties due to his opposition to Austrian centralism, Frano Lanza appointed mayor.
- 1865 – Bajamonti reelected for mayor.
- 1880 – Split county council dissolved, Aleksandar Nallini appointed commissary of Split.
- 1882 – People's Party wins elections for the first time, Dujam Rendić-Miočević becomes mayor.
- 1885 – Gajo Bulat becomes mayor.
- 1893 – Split Municipal Theatre opens.
- 1900 – Population: 27,198.
- 1922- New building of Split Archaeological Museum opened to public.

== 20th century ==
- 1911 – HNK Hajduk Split football team formed.
- 1918 – Ivo Tartaglia becomes mayor.
- 1924 – Museum of Natural History founded.
- 1925 – Zagreb-Split railway constructed.
- 1929 – Split becomes seat of the Littoral Banovina administrative region of Yugoslavia.
- 1931 – Gallery of Fine Arts founded.
- 1941 – Split annexed by Italy, becomes part of the Governorate of Dalmatia and capital of the province of Spalato.
- 1943
  - Split liberated by Yugoslav Partisans following the capitulation of Italy, later retaken by Nazi Germany
  - Slobodna Dalmacija newspaper begins publication.
- 1944 – Split liberated for the second and final time, becomes part of the Federal State of Croatia of Yugoslavia.
- 1954 – Split Summer Festival founded.
- 1960 – Split Festival of music begins.
- 1966 – Split Airport opens in Kaštela.
- 1971 - Population: 152,905.
- 1974 – University of Split established.
- 1976 – Museum of Croatian Archaeological Monuments opens.
- 1979 – Poljud Stadium built.
- 1990 – City hosts 1990 European Athletics Championships.
- 1991
  - 6 May: Protest against Yugoslav People's Army.
  - 14–16 November: Battle of the Dalmatian Channels occurs near city.
  - Population: 200,459.
- 1993
  - Split-Dalmatia County assembly begins meeting.
  - Sister city relationship established with Los Angeles, USA.
- 1995 – Radio Dalmacija begins broadcasting.
- 1997 - Croatian Maritime Museum established.
- 1998 – Croatia Boat Show begins.
- 1999 – Splitska Televizija (television station) founded.

== 21st century ==
- 2001 – February: Political protest.
- 2005 – A1 motorway (Zagreb-Split) constructed.
- 2006 – Split Suburban Railway begins operating.
- 2008 – Spaladium Arena opens.
- 2009 – 24 July: Train derailment at Rudine, near Split.
- 2011
  - Split Pride begins.
  - Population: 178,192; metro 349,314.
- 2013 - 1 July: Croatia becomes part of the European Union.

== See also ==
- History of Split
- List of mayors of Split
- Timelines of other cities in Croatia: Rijeka, Zagreb

== Bibliography ==
published in 18th-19th centuries

- Ruins of the palace of the Emperor Diocletian at Spalatro in Dalmatia. London: Robert Adam. 1764.
- John Gardner Wilkinson (1848), "(Spalato)", Dalmatia and Montenegro, London: J. Murray
- Andrew A. Paton (1849). "(Spalato)". Highlands and Islands of the Adriatic: Including Dalmatia, Croatia, and the Southern Provinces of the Austrian Empire. Vol. 1. Chapman and Hall. p. 232+.
- Emily Anne Beaufort Smythe Strangford (1864), "Dalmatia (Spalato)", The eastern shores of the Adriatic in 1863, London: R. Bentley, OCLC 1475159
- Edward Augustus Freeman (1881), "Spalato", Sketches from the subject and neighbour lands of Venice, London: Macmillan and Co., OCLC 679333
- Thomas Graham Jackson (1887), "Spalato", Dalmatia, Oxford: Clarendon Press
- R. Lambert Playfair (1892). "Spalato". Handbook to the Mediterranean (3rd ed.). London: J. Murray.

published in 20th century

- "Spalato". Austria-Hungary, Including Dalmatia and Bosnia. Leipzig: Karl Baedeker. 1905. OCLC 344268.
- F. Hamilton Jackson (1908), "Spalato", Shores of the Adriatic, New York: E.P. Dutton, OCLC 7584841
- F.K. Hutchinson (1909). "Spalato". Motoring in the Balkans. Chicago: McClurg & Co. OCLC 8647011.
- "Spalato" . Encyclopædia Britannica. Vol. 25 (11th ed.). 1910. pp. 591–592.
- Arthur L. Frothingham (1910). "Spalato". Roman Cities in Italy and Dalmatia. New York: Sturgis & Walton Company.
- Novak, Grga (1957). Povijest Splita. Vol. I. Split: Matica Hrvatska.
- Novak, Grga (1961). Povijest Splita. Vol. II. Split: Matica Hrvatska.
- Novak, Grga (1965). Povijest Splita. Vol. III. Split: Matica Hrvatska.
- Trudy Ring, ed. (1996). "Split". Southern Europe. Vol. 3. Fitzroy Dearborn. OCLC 31045650.

published in 21st century

- Novak, Grga (2004a). Prošlost Dalmacije. Vol. I. Split: Marjan Tisak. ISBN 953-214-181-2.
- Novak, Grga (2004b). Prošlost Dalmacije. Vol. II. Split: Marjan Tisak. ISBN 953-214-182-0.
- Šišić, Ferdo. Povijest Hrvata; pregled povijesti hrvatskog naroda 600. - 1918. Zagreb.
