= Temple of Jupiter, Split =

Temple of Jupiter
- Jupiterov hram (in Croatian)
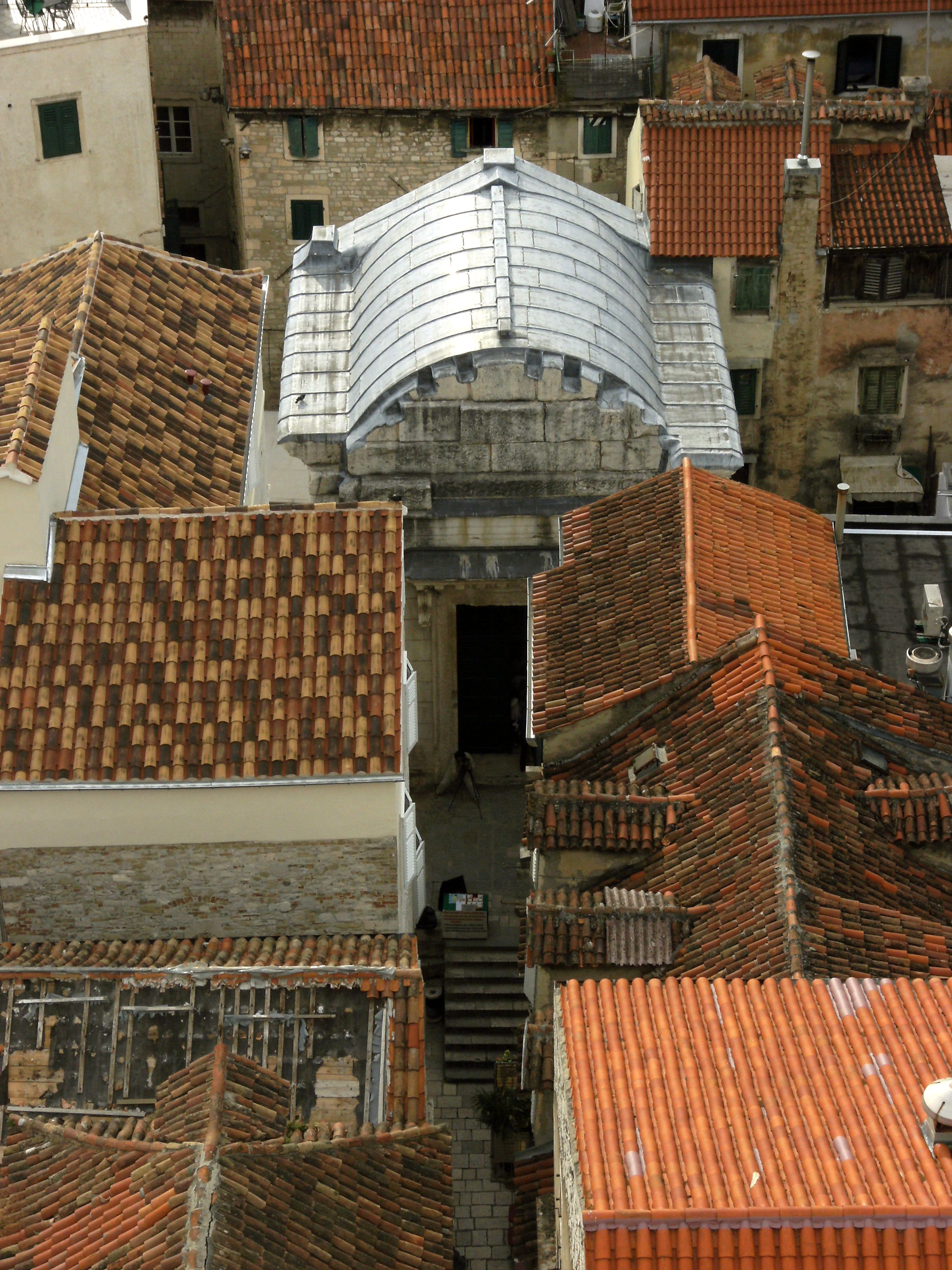
- Interactive map of the Temple of Jupiter area

General information
- Location: Split, Croatia
- Coordinates: 43.508341°N 16.439568°E
- Construction started: 295 AD
- Completed: 305 AD
- Client: Emperor Diocletian

The Temple of Jupiter (Croatian: Jupiterov hram) is a temple in Split, Croatia dedicated to the Ancient Roman god Jupiter. It is located in the western part of Diocletian's Palace near the Peristyle, the central square of the imperial complex. It was built between 295 and 305, during the construction of the Palace, and was probably turned into a Baptistery of St. John the Baptist in the 6th century, at the same time when the crypt dedicated to St. Thomas was built. Before the entrance to the Temple is one of the twelve sphinxes brought from Egypt by Emperor Diocletian. Scottish architect Robert Adam considered this temple to be one of Europe's most beautiful monuments.

== Description ==
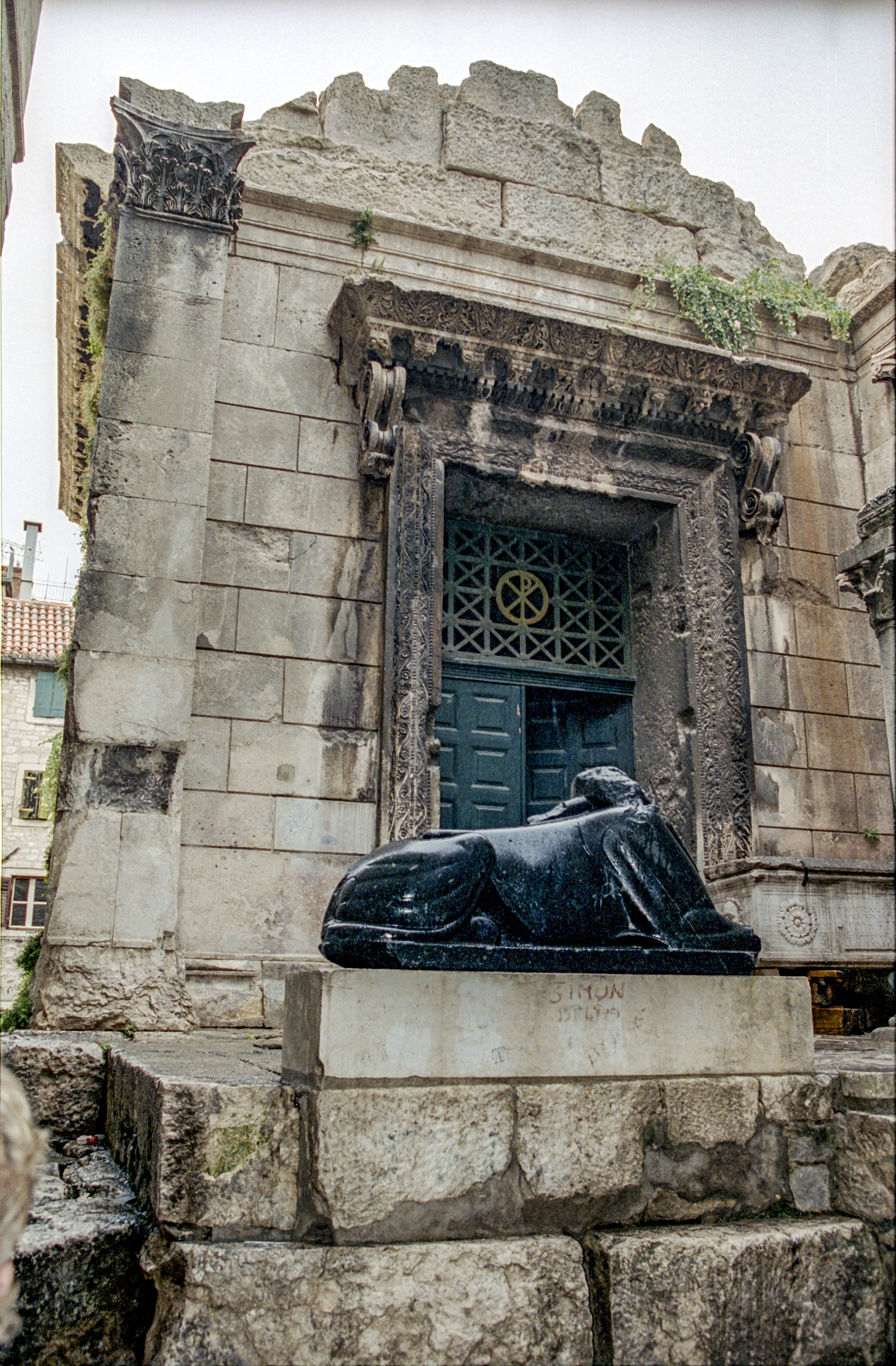
Headless sphinx in front of the entrance to the ancient Roman temple, today the Christian chapel.

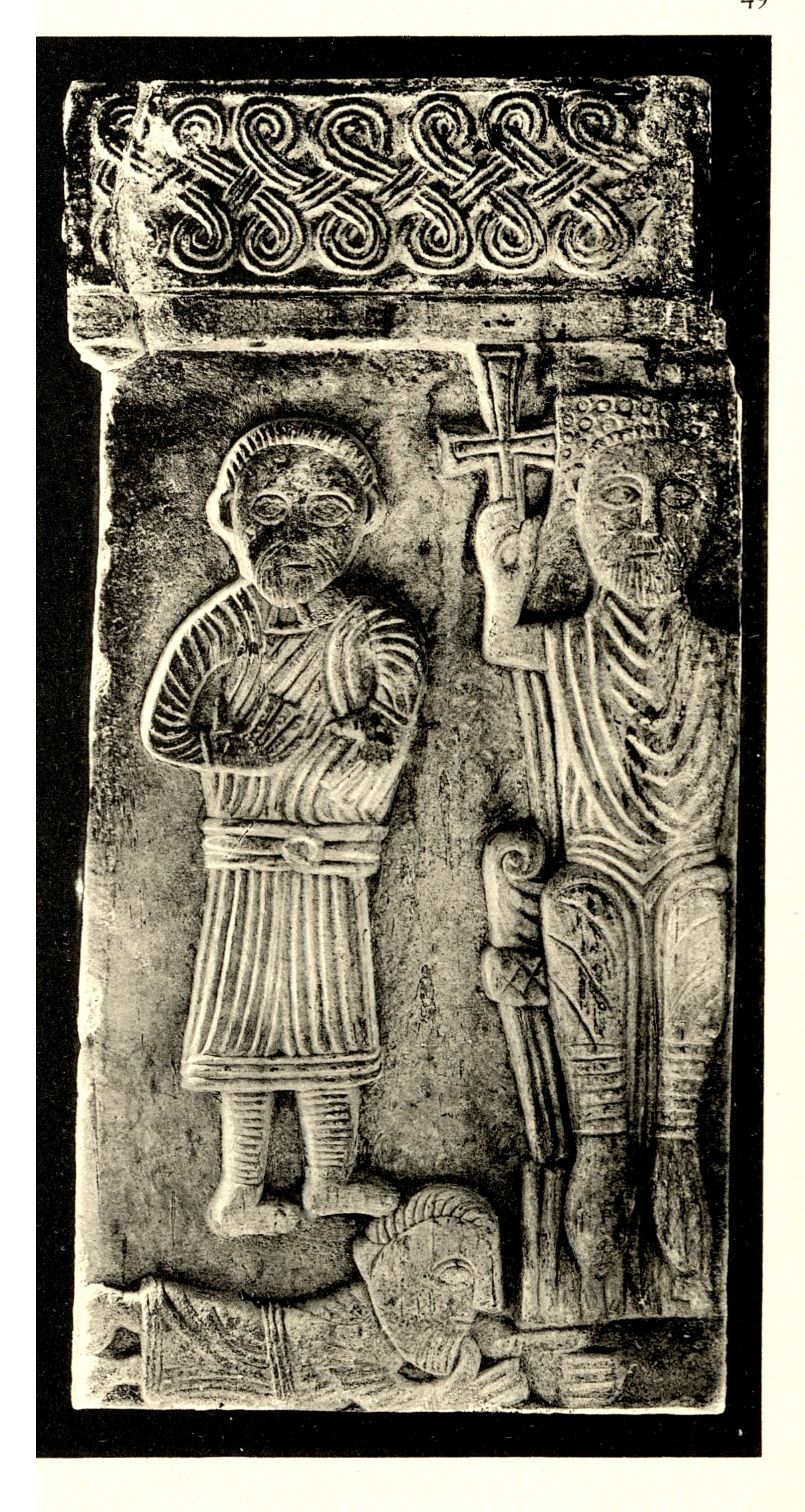
Pre-Romanesque marble tablet depicting the Croatian king.

The Temple of Jupiter was constructed between 295 and 305 as part of Diocletian's Palace. It was dedicated to the supreme Roman god and Diocletian's "divine father", Jupiter. The temple is located in the western, religious part of the palace. Since the Emperor unexpectedly abdicated the throne in 305 and arrived at the palace from Nicomedia earlier, finishing work on the construction of the Palace was stopped so parts of the Temple remained unfinished.

Reliefs depicting gods and various heroes, such as Victoria, Triton, Helios, Hercules, Jupiter and Apollo, are placed in front of the Temple, above the entrance. Doorways are richly decorated, especially the impressive Temple's barrel coffered vault.

Sarcophagi, containing the remains of two Archbishops of Split, Ivan of Ravenna (died c. 1059) and Lovre (died c. 1099), are placed inside the Temple. In addition, there is a large bronze statue of St. John the Baptist made by Ivan Meštrović. A Renaissance sarcophagus of Jakov Selembrije from the 16th century is placed in front of the baptistery.

In the 11th century, a Romanesque style bell tower was built above the vault. It is similar to one in the Church of Our Lady of the Tower above Iron Gate of Diocletian's palace, which was demolished around 1840 in accordance with the then classicist aspirations which argued for purification of ancient monuments and buildings.

During late Antiquity and the Middle Ages, the Temple was converted into a baptistery dedicated to St. John the Baptist, while the crypt was dedicated to St. Thomas.

In the 13th century, the baptismal font made of parts of the altar partition from the 11th century which was originally located in the cathedral was placed within the baptismal font. The oldest representation of Croatian king Peter Krešimir IV or Demetrius Zvonimir with their subjects is engraved on one of the marble rood screens. The second rood screen is decorated with pentagram with flowers and birds inside a star that is surrounded by a wreath which represents the Holy Trinity and the two natures of Jesus Christ - the divine and the human. A third rood screen is decorated with motifs of Croatian interlace in various forms.

The Temple's barrel coffered vault influenced Dalmatian early Renaissance art which is best seen in the example of Andrea Alessi's baptistery and Chapel of blessed John in Trogir.

In 1907, a few houses on the west and south side of the Temple were demolished, so the Temple was freed of fittings, except those in the northwest corner that are still leaning against it.

== See also ==
- Diocletian's Palace
- List of Roman domes
- List of Ancient Roman temples
- Roman architecture

== Gallery ==
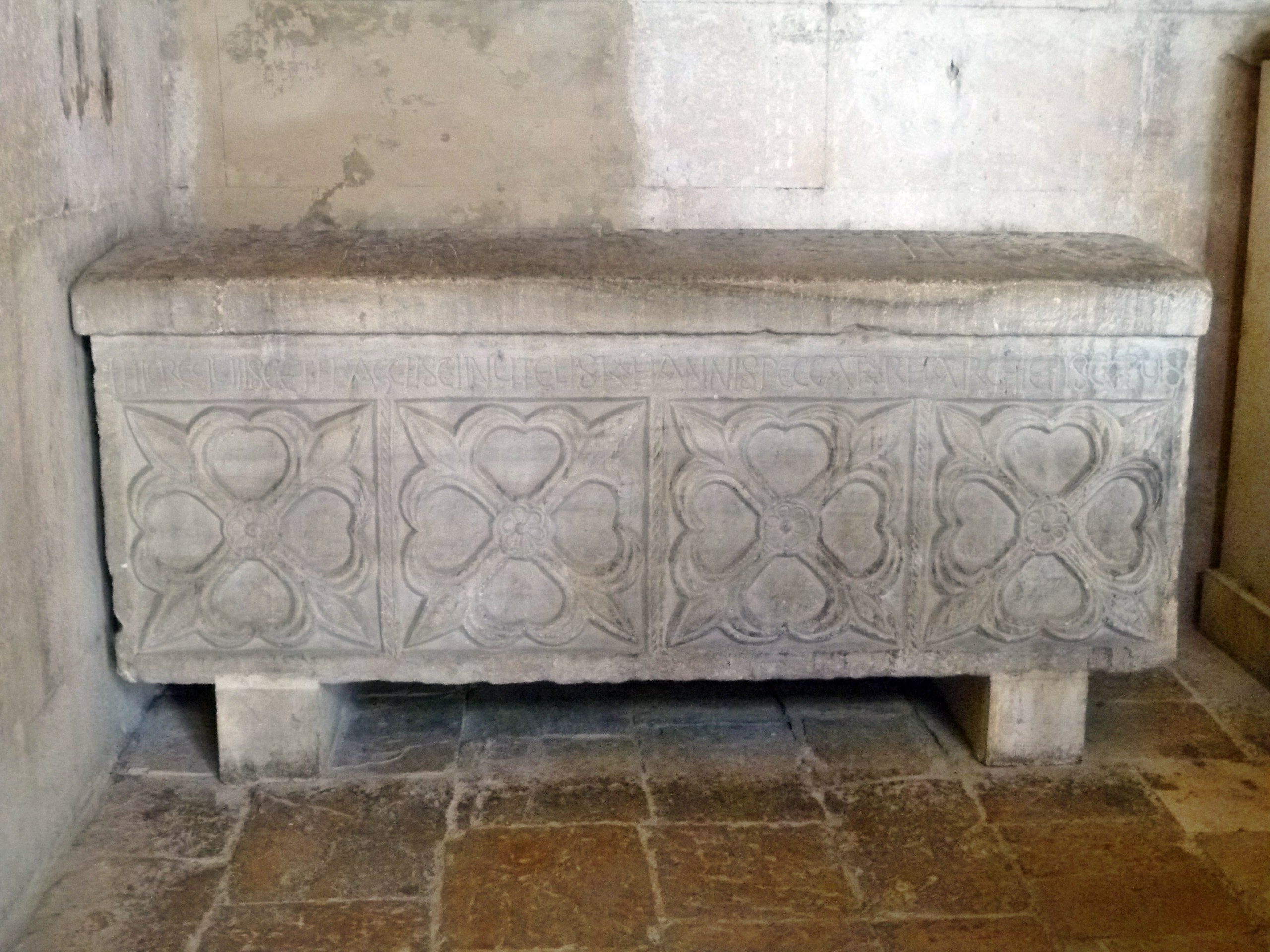
Lovren's sarcophagus.

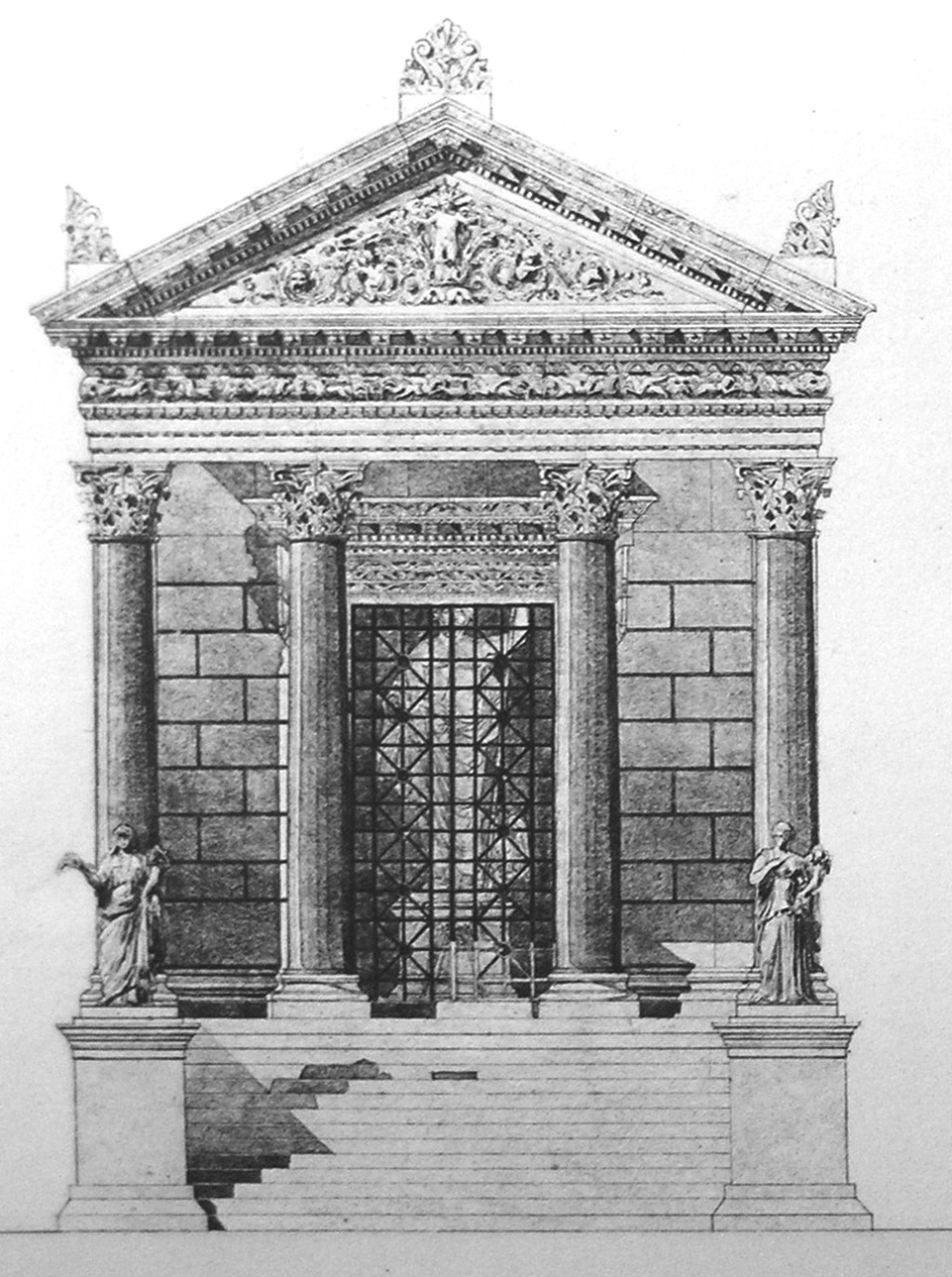
The supposed view of the temple in antiquity. Drawing from 1912.

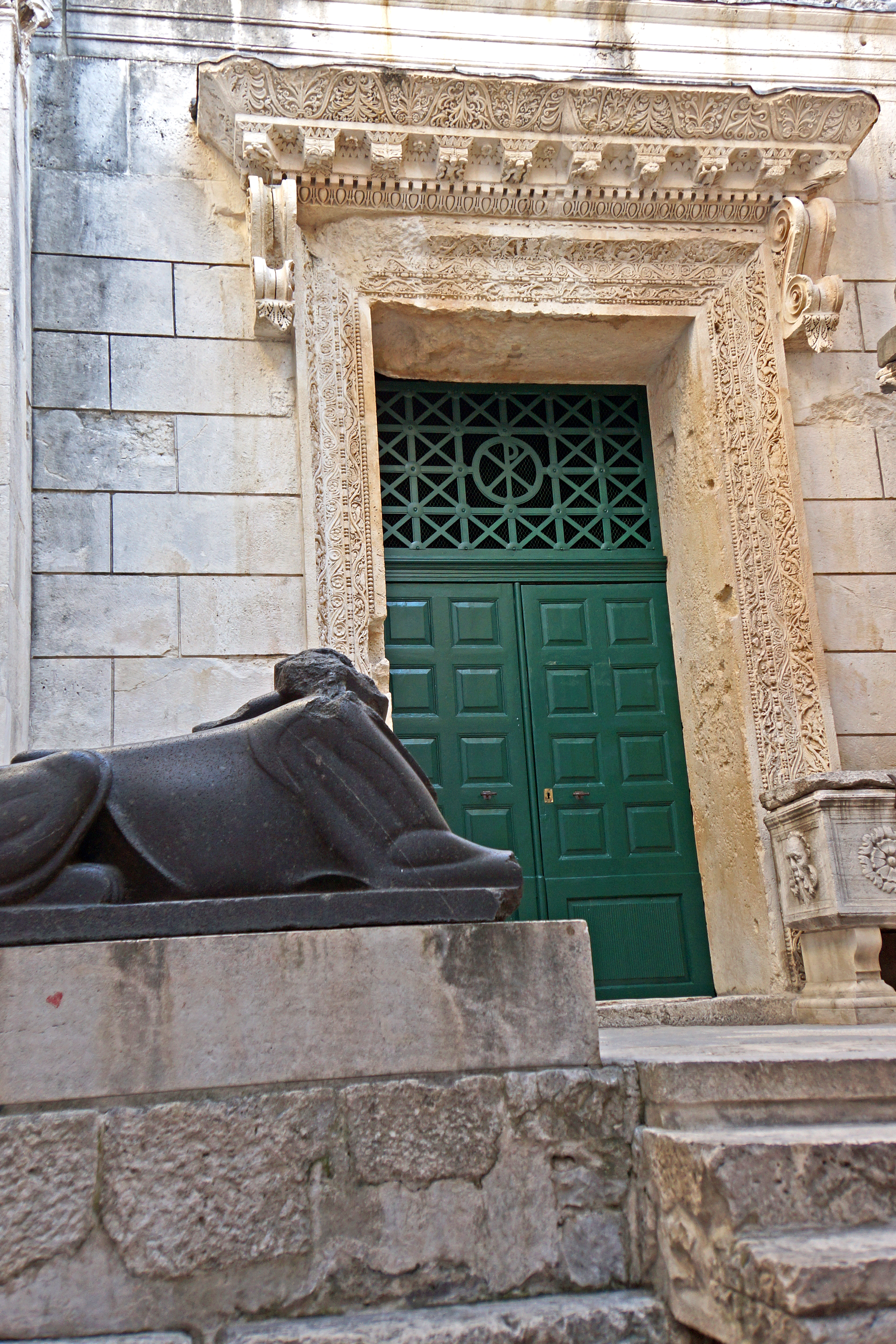
The sphinx in front of the entrance.

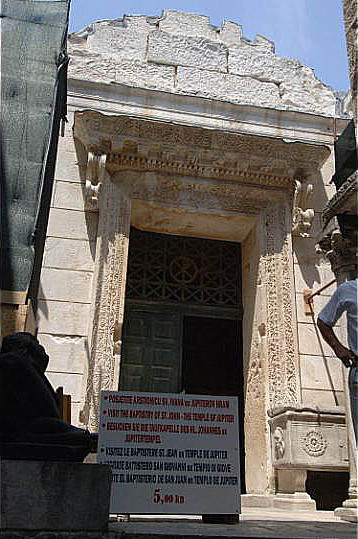
Entrance to the temple.

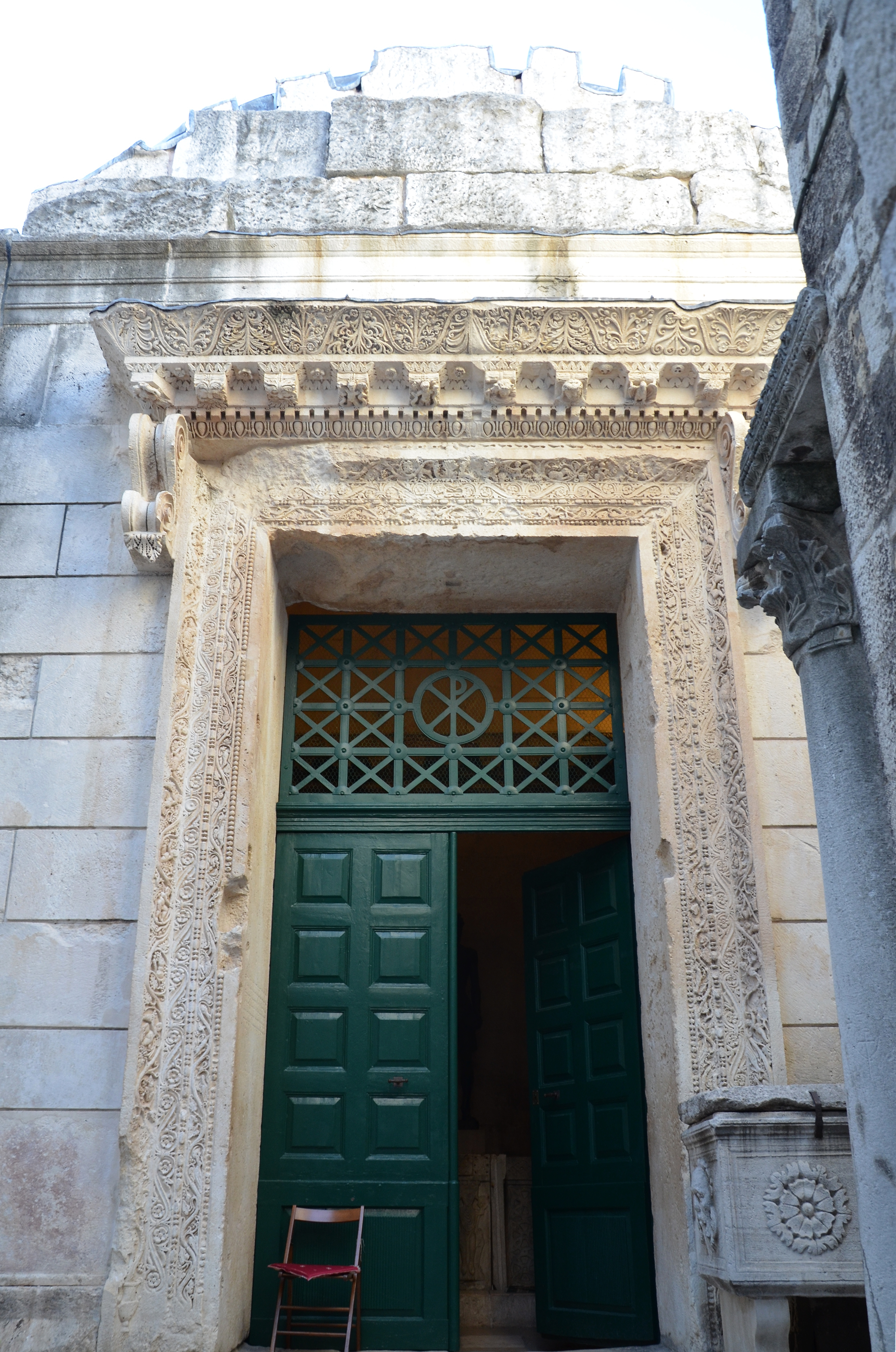
Temple of Jupiter.

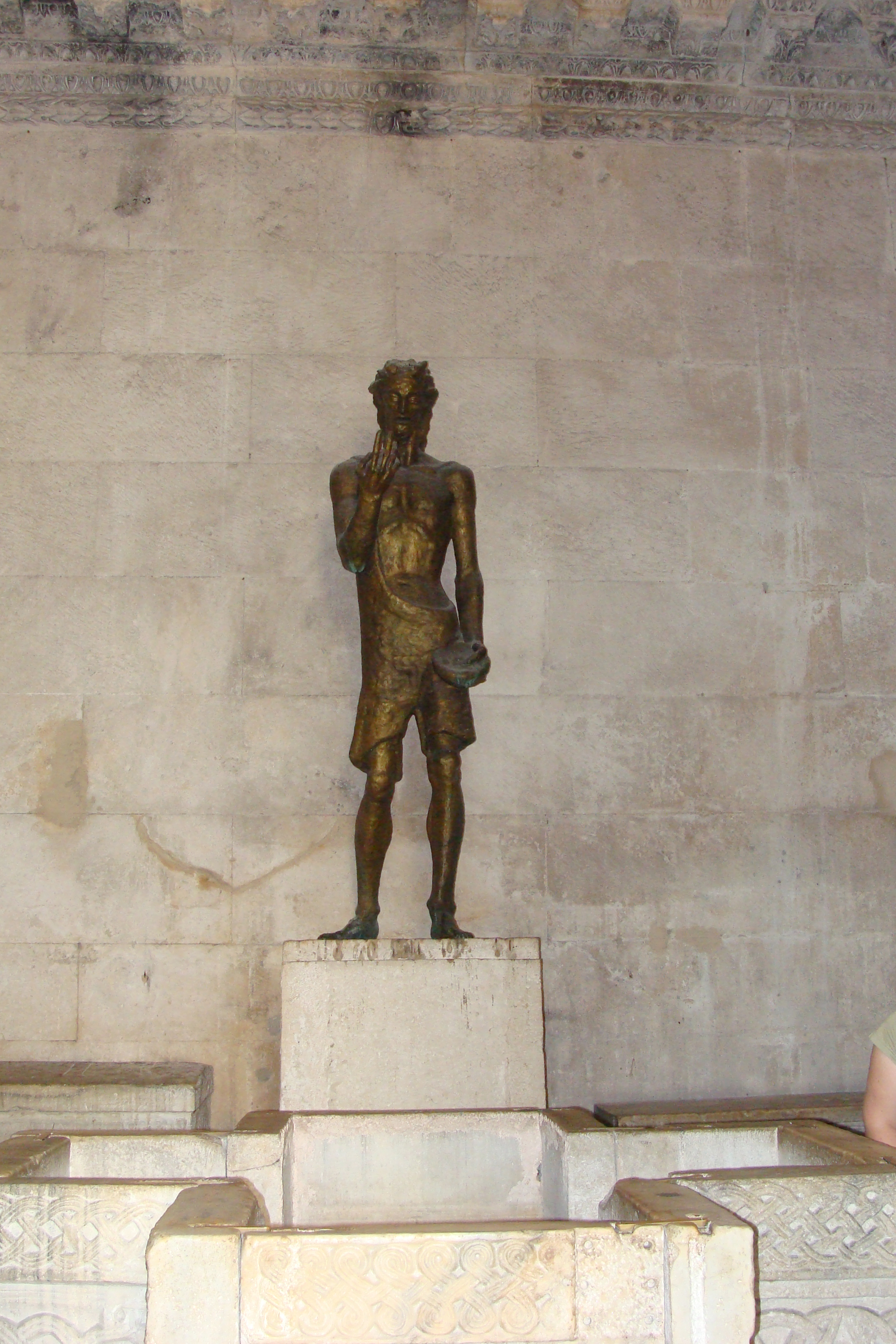
Bronze statue of St. John.

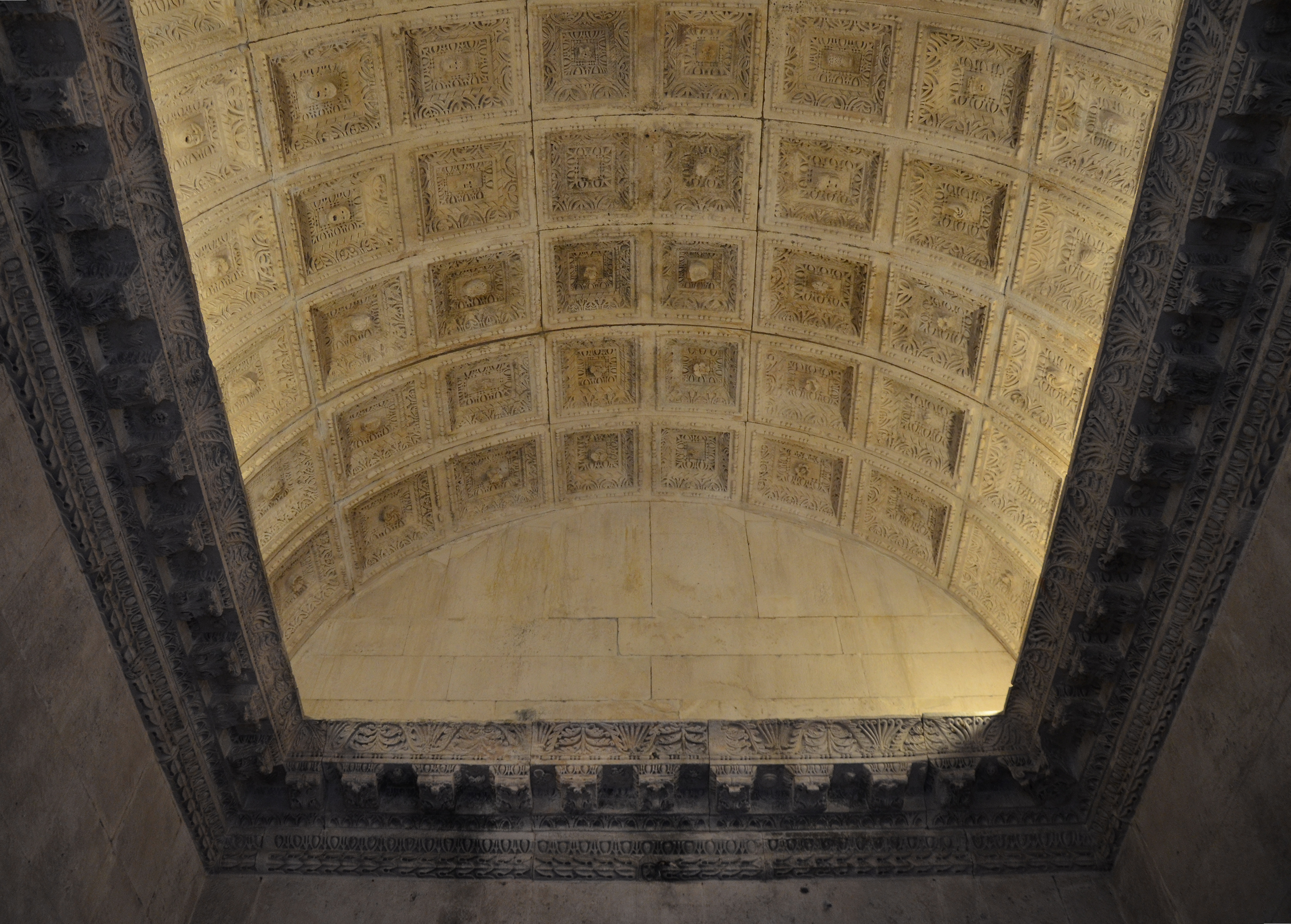
Coffered celling.
