= List of elections in 1883 =

The following elections occurred in the year 1883.

== Africa ==
- 1883 Liberian general election

== Europe ==
- 1883 Croatian parliamentary by-election
- 1883 Dalmatian parliamentary election
- 1883 Dutch general election
- 1883 Faroese general election
- 1883 Serbian parliamentary election

== North America ==
=== Canada ===
- 1883 Manitoba general election
- 1883 Ontario general election

=== United States ===
- 1883 New York state election

==== United States Senate ====
- 1882 and 1883 United States Senate elections
- 1883 United States Senate election in Massachusetts

==== United States House of Representatives ====
- 1883 United States House of Representatives elections
- 1883 Alabama's 8th congressional district special election

==== United States lieutenant gubernatorial ====
- 1883 Minnesota lieutenant gubernatorial election

==== United States gubernatorial ====
- 1883 Georgia gubernatorial special election
- 1883 Iowa gubernatorial election
- 1883 Kentucky gubernatorial election
- 1883 Maryland gubernatorial election
- 1883 Massachusetts gubernatorial election
- 1883 Minnesota gubernatorial election
- 1883 New Jersey gubernatorial election
- 1883 Ohio gubernatorial election
- 1883 Rhode Island gubernatorial election

==== United States mayoral elections ====
- 1883 Boston mayoral election
- 1883 Chicago mayoral election

== See also ==
- Category:1883 elections
