= Siege of Zara (1813) =

Napoleonic war event

Siege of Zara Siege of Zadar
- Part of the Adriatic Campaign of the Napoleonic Wars
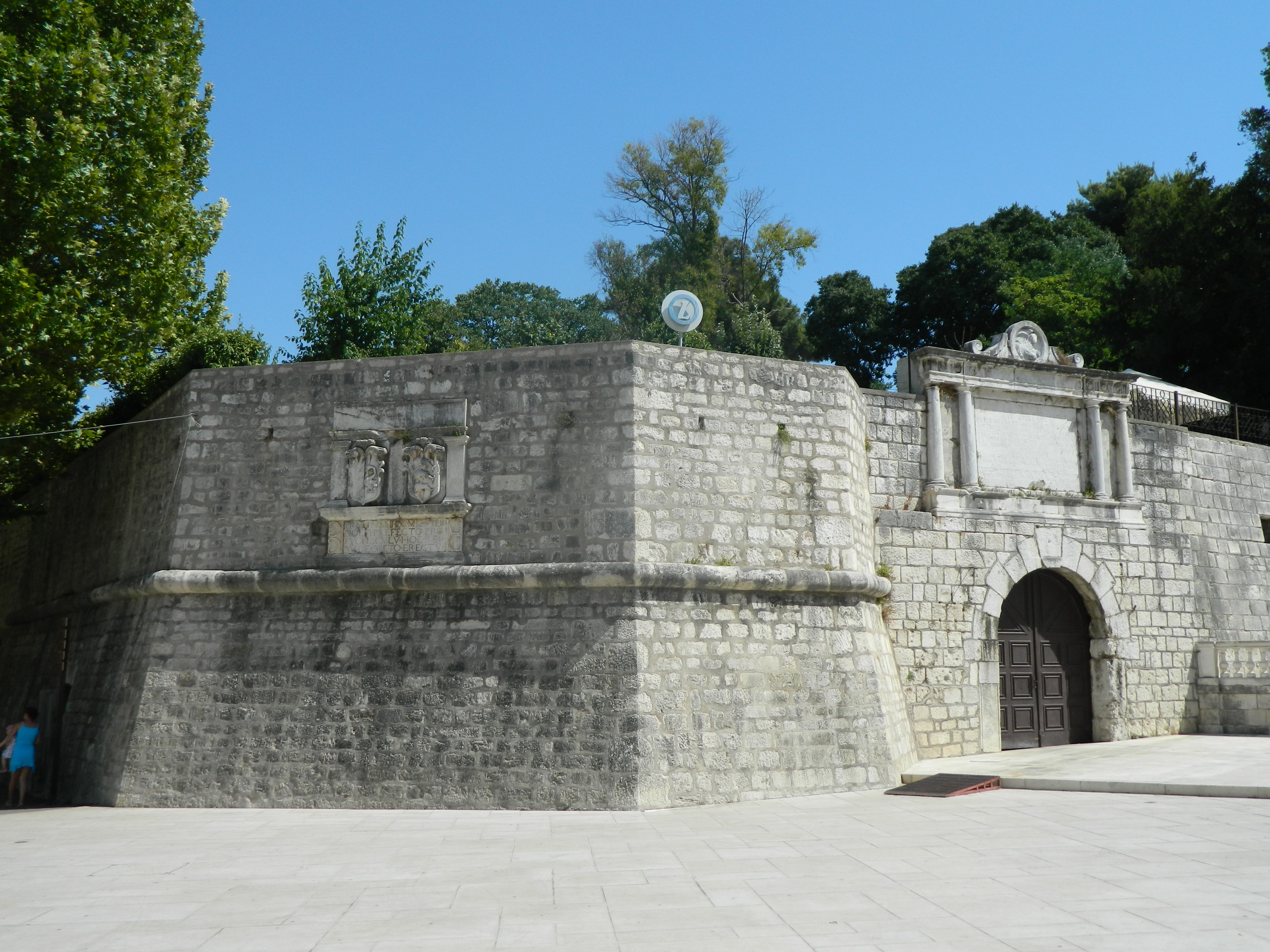
- Part of Zara's (present day Zadar) fortification system
Date	22 November–5 December 1813
Location	Zara, Illyrian Provinces, French Empire (now Zadar, Croatia) 44.11667°N 15.21667°E
Result	Anglo-Austrian victory

Belligerents
United Kingdom; Austria	(France) French Empire; Italy

Commanders and leaders
(United Kingdom) George Cadogan (Austrian Empire) Franjo Ksaver Tomašić	(France) Claude Roize (surrendered)

Strength
2,900; 2 frigates	2,000; 12 gunboats

Casualties and losses
Low	600 captured 238 cannons captured 12 gunboats sunk (later salvaged)

The siege of Zara or siege of Zadar, also known as the blockade of Zara, was a military event that took place between 22 November and 5 December 1813, during the Adriatic Campaign of the Napoleonic Wars. During the siege, an Anglo-Austrian force under command of George Cadogan in HMS Havannah blockaded and bombarded Zara (modern day Zadar) which was then held by a French garrison. Within two weeks, the garrison surrendered to the attackers.

== Background ==
The Treaty of Schönbrunn with the Austrian Empire in 1809 had solidified French influence in the Adriatic by formalising their control of the Illyrian Provinces on the Eastern shore. After the Battle of Vis (Ital.:Lissa) in March 1811 however, the Royal Navy had achieved dominance over the French in the Adriatic Sea. Austria declared war on France in August 1813 and working in conjunction with the Austrian armies now invading the Illyrian Provinces and Northern Italy, Rear Admiral Thomas Fremantle's ships were able to rapidly transport British and Austrian troops from one point to another, forcing the surrender of the strategic ports.

In November 1813, HMS Havannah was attached to Thomas Fremantles squadron that had successfully blockaded and besieged Trieste. She was then detached to take the port of Zadar with the assistance of Weazel. Zadar was a regular fortification with 110 pieces of brass cannon, seven mortars and eleven mounted howitzers manned by a garrison of 2,000 troops, nearly half of them Croatian commanded by an experienced French general, Baron Roize.

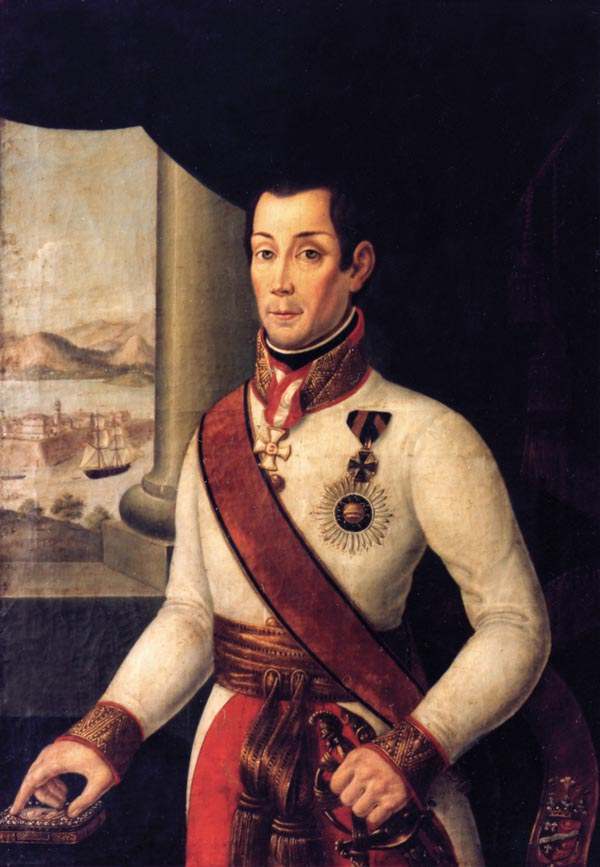
General Franjo Ksaver Tomašić, Croat in the Habsburg Army service

== Siege ==
When the Anglo-Austrian troops arrived on 22 November they found that the fortress was well supplied and ready to stand a long siege, so Cadogan determined to blockade and to eventually attack the place. Cadogan intended to use the ships' guns to establish batteries on the shore with British seaman and Royal Marines to make up the force to arm them. They were to combine with the land blockading Austrian force which numbered 1,500 men (many of them were Croats) under Baron Franjo Ksaver Tomašić who had contributed two howitzers. Lieutenant William Hamley with a force of sixty men were given the job of setting up batteries. Assisting him were two lieutenants and a master's mates of Havannah. With two 32-pounder carronades, eight eighteen pounder guns and seven long twelve pounder guns, together with all the necessary powder and ammunition, were landed from Havannah and Weazel. They dragged them on sledges across swamps and ditches at night, a distance of about three miles before establishment. The Union Jack was hoisted on each of three batteries on 23 November and they started a bombardment in almost incessant rain.

Twelve gunboats, each carrying a long 24-pounder and one smaller gun were moored under the walls. The French fire from these inflicted some damage on the British and Austrian defences at first and sandbags were continually needed to fill the few entrenchments. On 1 December one long 18-pounder and the carronades were redirected to deal with the French gunboats and, after an hour and a half, not one remained afloat.

In the garrison a mutiny broke out amongst the Croat battalions in Roize's force. This was put down by Roize but instead they escaped the fortress and gave themselves up to the Austrians and British troops waiting outside. This number constituted nearly two thirds of Rosie's garrison leaving just 800 men left.

On 6 December, after thirteen days and nights of bombardment in when the batteries had only one round of shot left, Roize sent out a flag of truce and capitulated.

== Aftermath ==
Cadogan and general Tomašić laid out the terms to Roize; the French would be allowed to return to Italy but not to engage in combat unless they were exchanged. Once the surrender terms were agreed the French marched out and the British and Austrians entered Zadar.

In all, the British and Austrians had captured 110 guns and 18 howitzers, 350 men as well as 100 dismounted guns and twelve salvageable gunboats. As they were about to leave for Trieste Cadogan was later instructed to hand over all prizes and spoils of war to the Austrians. (This order cost the crews of Havannah and Weazel an estimated £300,000 in prize money.) The Emperor of Austria, Francis II however, awarded Lieutenant William Hamley the Imperial Austrian Order of Leopold for his services at Zadar.

Soon after, one by one most towns in the Illyrian Provinces fell to Anglo-Austrian forces. Cattaro fell the same month and in January 1814 Ragusa fell. By the end of March 1814 all towns and cities had surrendered to the British or the allied rebels that had risen in revolt, leaving the Adriatic in complete allied control with the exception of Corfu. Zadar was restored to the Habsburg monarchy of the Austrian Empire by the Congress of Vienna.
