= 1889 Dalmatian parliamentary election =

Parliamentary elections were held in the Kingdom of Dalmatia in 1889.

== Results ==
According to one source,the results were:

Party	Seats	+/–
People's Party	27	1
Serb People's Party	8	0
Autonomist Party	6	0
Total	41	0
