= 1867 Dalmatian parliamentary election =

Parliamentary elections were held in the Kingdom of Dalmatia in 1867. The Autonomists claimed victory for the third straight time, while the opposition People's Party narrowed the gap.

== Results ==
Party	Seats	+/–
Autonomist Party	26	–6
People's Party	15	+6
Total	41	0
