= 1864 Dalmatian parliamentary election =

Parliamentary elections were held in the Kingdom of Dalmatia (then a region of the Austrian Empire and now part of Croatia and Montenegro) in 1864. The Autonomists claimed their second in a run of three victories.

== Results ==
Party	Seats	+/–
Autonomist Party	32	+3
People's Party	9	–3
Total	41	0
