= 1883 Dalmatian parliamentary election =

Parliamentary elections were held in the Kingdom of Dalmatia in 1883. The elections marked the first time that a party other than People's Party or Autonomist Party won seats in the Diet of Dalmatia.

== Results ==
Party	Seats	+/–
People's Party	26	–4
Serb People's Party	8	New
Autonomist Party	7	–4
Total	41	0
Source: Diklić

== Bibliography ==
- Diklić, Marjan (2001). "Don Ivo Prodan u Dalmatinskom saboru" (PDF). Radovi Zavoda za povijesne znanosti HAZU u Zadru (in Croatian) (43): 389–457.
