= Franjo Tomašić =

Baron Franjo Ksaver Tomašić
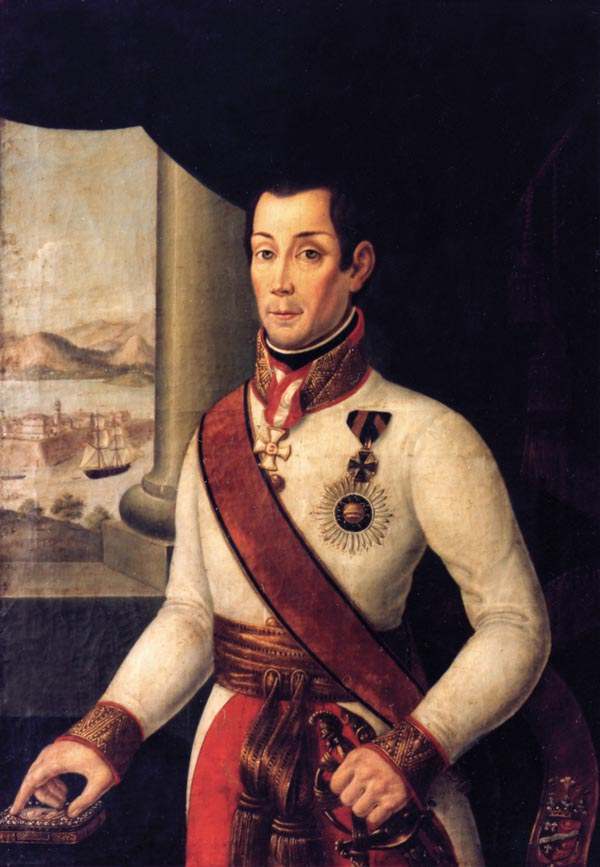

1st Governor of Kingdom of Dalmatia
- In office 26 December 1813 – 12 August 1831
- Appointed by: Emperor Francis II
- Preceded by: Office established
- Succeeded by: Wenzeslau Lilienberg Water

Personal details
- Born: 2 October 1761 Rijeka, Kingdom of Croatia, Austrian Empire (now Croatia)
- Died: 12 August 1831 (aged 69) Zadar, Kingdom of Dalmatia, Austrian Empire (now Croatia)
- Resting place: City Cemetery of Zadar
- Education: Theresian Military Academy
- Profession: Soldier
- Awards: Military Order of Maria Theresa, Order of Leopold (Knight), Order of the Iron Crown (Knight First Class)

Military service
- Allegiance: Austrian Empire
- Years of service: 1776–1831
- Rank: Lieutenant field marshal
- Battles/wars: French Revolutionary Wars; Napoleonic Wars

Franjo Ksaver Tomašić (2 October 1761 – 12 August 1831) was a Croatian baron and a lieutenant field marshal of the Austrian Empire's Army who served as a First Governor of Kingdom of Dalmatia between 1815 and 1831.

== Early life and education ==
Baron Franjo Ksaver Tomašić was born in the port-town of Rijeka on 2 October 1761, to a noble Croatian family that was connected to the famous Mogorović family. At the age of 15, he entered the Vienna Army Academy of Engineering, from which he graduated as one of the most capable cadets. At the age of 20, Tomašić became a cadet at the Men's Choir. He soon became an officer and expressed his diligence in the construction of the Josefov Fortress in present-day Czech Republic.

== Career ==
Tomašić's first military experience was a war defending Le Quesnoy Fortress in 1793, in which he participated as a captain of the Engineering Corps. During the conflict, Tomašić was captured by French who condemned him to death by a guillotine. He eventually survived thanks to the end of Reign of Terror and help by the Fortress commander, Colonel Beck, who praised him before the emperor Francis II for his courage and merit.

In 1797, he was promoted to the rank of major in the Engineering Corps and was, as a sign of special Emperors' confidence, appointed associate of the Austrian ambassador to the court of Russian Emperor Paul I and thus moved to Petrograd. However, he did not stay long in this position, as he was given the command to join General Alexander Suvorovs' units that Russia sent to Italy to assist France during the French Revolutionary Wars. Tomašić was assigned to the corps of General Franz Seraph of Orsini-Rosenberg, and participated in all the events of the conflict.

In the 1800s, fought at Fayle Hill. On 11 April, in an attack on the Italian fortress Bochetto, Tomašić, in order to encourage his troops, stood at their fore and skillfully and bravely led them to the attack. However, he was almost mortally wounded through his chest. His wound was hard to heal and he suffered the consequences for the rest of his life. On 30 April 1802, he was awarded the Military Order of Maria Theresa on the 68th promotion, and was promoted to the rank of lieutenant colonel, and afterwards colonel. On 29 July 1808, he was given a title of the baron, which was also transferred to his younger brother Nikola, who was at the time an army Major, and later became a Colonel.

During the Napoleonic Wars, at the 1809 Siege of Palmanova, Tomašić was assigned to the main Austrian army headquarters and promoted to the rank of Major General on 22 August. After France occupied parts of the Austrian Empire, from which they created the Kingdom of Illyria, he was named commander of Leopoldstadt, and became a member of a commission, led by General Baron Knežević, that set new borders between France and Austria within the Croatian territory. After that, Tomašić became the commander of Zagreb which was at the time an important border point between Austrian and French territories.

During the 1813-14 War of the Sixth Coalition, Tomašić was given the task of reclaiming Dalmatia. He had very few people and resources available. In October 1813, he started his campaign with 2,900 soldiers. On the night of 29–30 October, he occupied the lower part of the town of Knin with one of the battalions composed of men from Lika under the command of Colonel Popović, and called for the French soldiers that had barracked themselves in the Knin Fortress to surrender. The fortress was surrendered on 31 October and all soldiers in French service were allowed to leave freely. On 3 November, he came with his units to the city of Zadar, the capital of Dalmatia, which was defended by French General César Antoine Roize. After weeks of fighting, General Roize proclaimed capitulation on 6 December. For the occasion of his entrance to the town on 11 November 1813, Girolamo (Jerolim) Alesani composed a serenata to the libretto by Giovanni Kreglianovich Albinoni. Such celebration was notable, because serenatas of this kind were normally composed and performed only for the anniversaries of the emperor and empress. On 15 December, Tomašić sent his adjutant, General Bogdan Milutinović with two battalions and one additional troop to reclaim Kotor, Dubrovnik and Fort Norin. The campaign was successful. He eventually expelled all the French troops led by three generals from Dalmatia and sent them as prisoners of war to Italy.

On 26 December 1813, Tomašić was awarded the Order of Leopold, promoted to the rank of Lieutenant Field Marshal, and appointed provisional governor of Dalmatia, which then included Dubrovnik, the Bay of Kotor and parts of Albania. In 1816, the Emperor named him the second owner of the 22nd Infantry Regiment of Prince Leopold Sicilian.

Baron Tomašić died in Zadar on 12 August 1831, before he could receive his last recognition from the Emperor, who awarded him the Order of the Iron Crown shortly before his death.
