= Zdenko Vinski =

Croatian archaeologist

- Born: 3 May 1913; Zagreb, Austro-Hungarian Empire, (now Croatia)
- Died: 13 October 1996 (aged 83); Zagreb, Croatia
- Education: University of Vienna
- Occupation: Archaeologist
- Parent(s): Oton Vinski; Štefanija Alexander
- Relatives: Samuel David Alexander (great-granduncle); Šandor Alexander (great-granduncle); Oskar Alexander (great-granduncle); Viktor Alexander (great-granduncle)

Zdenko Vinski (3 May 1913 – 13 October 1996) was a notable Croatian archaeologist.

Vinski was born to a Jewish family on 3 May 1913 in Zagreb where he finished elementary and high school. His father was Oton Vinski, an influential Croatian banker, and his mother was Štefanija Alexander, who came from the Zagreb Alexander family. Vinski graduated from the Faculty of Philosophy at the University of Vienna. In 1937, he received his postgraduate diploma which he translated in 1938 at the Faculty of Humanities and Social Sciences, University of Zagreb. Vinski was a lecturer at the department of General and National Medieval Archeology at the University of Zagreb. His works are considered essential in establishing the post-World War II apparatus for Croatia's archaeology. It was Vinski who dated the Bijelo Brdo culture ("White Hill") site 1 on the River Drava east of Osijek as 7th Century.
