= Viktor Alexander =

- Born: 1 May 1865; Zagreb, Austro-Hungarian Empire, (now Croatia)
- Died: 26 March 1934 (aged 68); Zagreb, Kingdom of Yugoslavia
- Education: University of Zagreb
- Occupation: Prosecutor
- Relatives: Oskar Alexander (stepbrother); Samuel David Alexander (cousin); Šandor Alexander (cousin)

Viktor Alexander (May 1, 1865 – March 26, 1934) was a well-known Croatian lawyer and public prosecutor in Zagreb, the capital of Croatia.

== Background and family ==
Alexander was born in Zagreb on May 1, 1865, to a wealthy and prominent Jewish family Alexander. His father, Ljudevit Alexander, was from Güssing, Austria and his mother Leonora (née Weiss) Alexander was from Veszprém, Hungary, the daughter of a wealthy merchant Wolf (Volf) and Johanna (born Stern) Weiss. He was raised with his brother Erich, and half-siblings Artur, Oskar Arthur, Robert Milan, Gizela Grünwald, and Olga Eisner, all from his father's second marriage. Alexander's mother died when he was three years old, and his father married Ida (née Weiss) Alexander in 1870. Alexander's stepmother was not related to his mother, even though she had the same maiden name. Alexander finished elementary school in Zagreb, and high school in Senj, a town in Croatia. He attended and graduated from the Faculty of Law at the University of Zagreb. Alexander married twice, his first wife was Osijek born Olga (née Weiss), sister of a notable Zagreb banker Oton Vinski (born Otto Weiss). Alexander separated from his first wife in 1904, and married Ivana (née Erben) from Petrinja, daughter of Franjo and Milka Erben. Alexander meet his second wife through his stepsister Olga.

== Career ==
Alexander was a member of the Freemasonry Jewish Lodge Zagreb. He was a board member of the colliery "Mirna", owned by his cousin Samuel David Alexander. At the beginning of his career, Alexander was junior barrister in the district court of Vukovar. Later he was the public prosecutor in Osijek. When he returned to Zagreb, at first, he was the deputy public prosecutor and later he was appointed as the public prosecutor. Before and during World War I, Alexander was one of the most influential people in Croatia, thanks to his friendship with Ban Iván Skerlecz. After World War I, he was decorated with Order of St. Sava and Order of the Yugoslav Crown.

In 1917, Alexander played an important role in liberating loyal and wrongly charged people from accusations of high treason. He travelled to Vienna, to have an audience with Charles I of Austria, to whom he submitted a report which showed that the accusations of the Austro-Hungarian central administration in Serbia against many distinguished citizens and political leaders such as Dr. Ivo Frank, Dr. Aleksandar Horvat, Dr. Vladimir Sachs-Petrović, almost all the Croatian population in the Kingdom of Croatia-Slavonia, Military Frontier and Kingdom of Dalmatia, were based upon forged documents about supposed secret espionage in favour of the Kingdom of Serbia.

== Death ==
Alexander died on March 26, 1934, in Zagreb and was buried at the Mirogoj Cemetery.

== See also ==
- Samuel David Alexander
- Šandor Alexander
- Oskar Alexander

== Bibliography ==
- Ivan Mirnik, Željko Holjevac (2012). 1918. u hrvatskoj povijesti; Referat Dr. Viktora Alexandra Caru Karlu. Zagreb: Matica hrvatska, Zagreb.
