= Vinski (disambiguation) =

Vinski is a village in Estonia. Vinski may also refer to:

== People ==
- Oton Vinski (1877–1942), Croatian banker
- Zdenko Vinski (1913–1996), Croatian archaeologist

== Other uses ==
- Vinski Vrh, Ormož, settlement in Slovenia
- Vinski Vrh pri Šmarju, settlement in Slovenia
