= Trialism in Austria-Hungary =

Political movement in Austria-Hungary

Austria-Hungary ca. 1911, showing ethnicities and internal political boundaries (dotted lines)

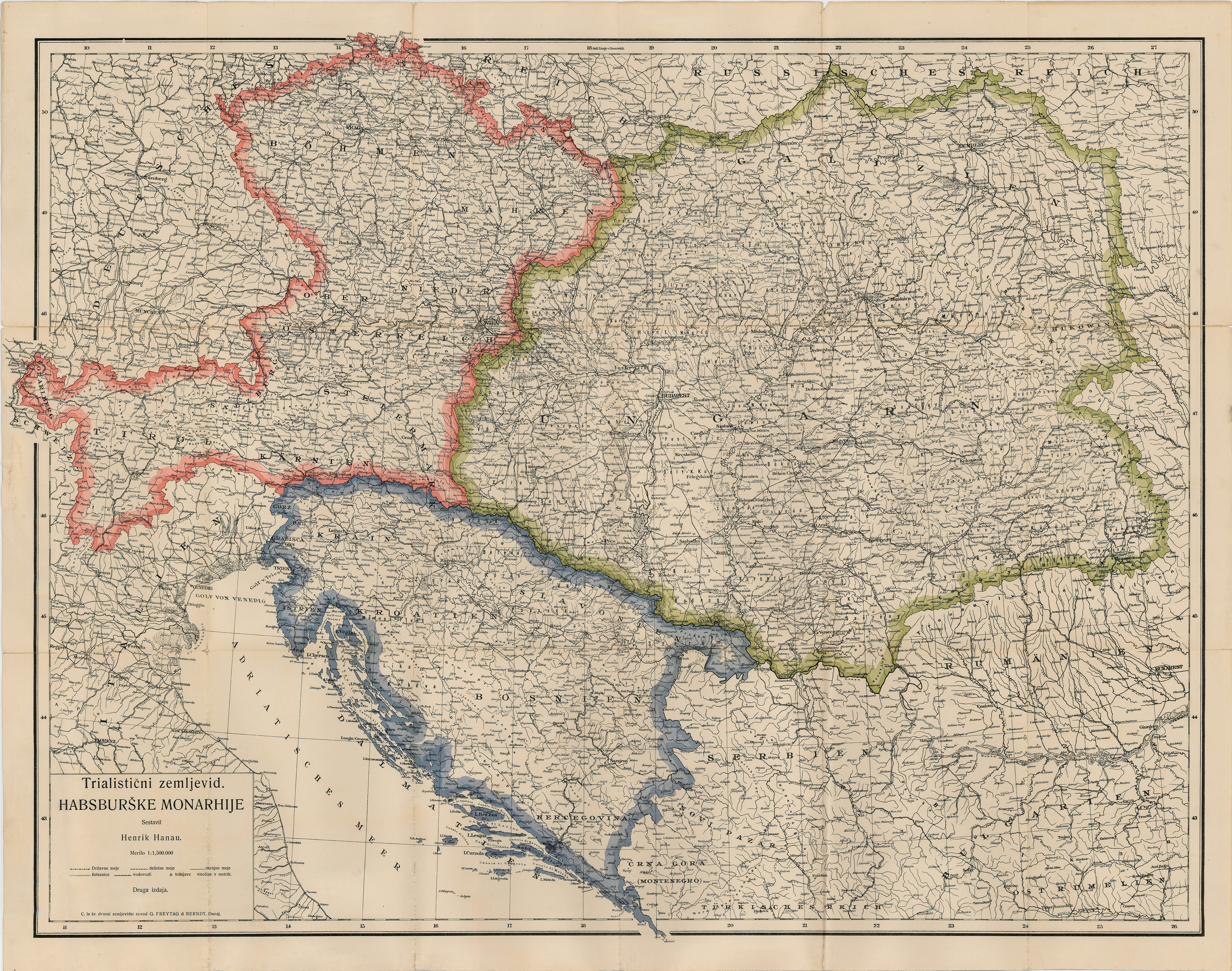
Trialist proposal from 1905. Henrik Hanau, Vienna

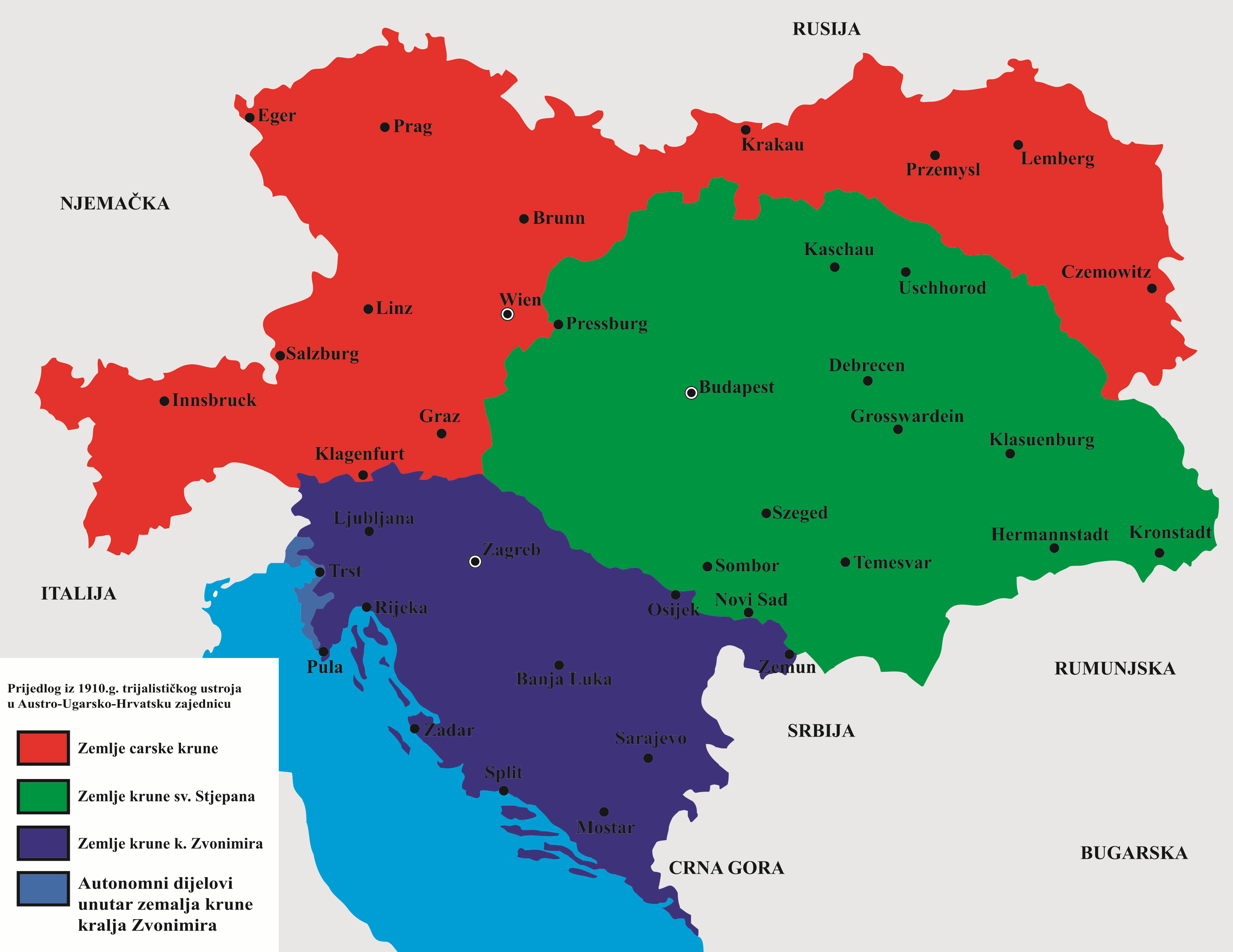
The most common trialist proposal, dr. Nikola Zvonimir Bjelovučić 1910

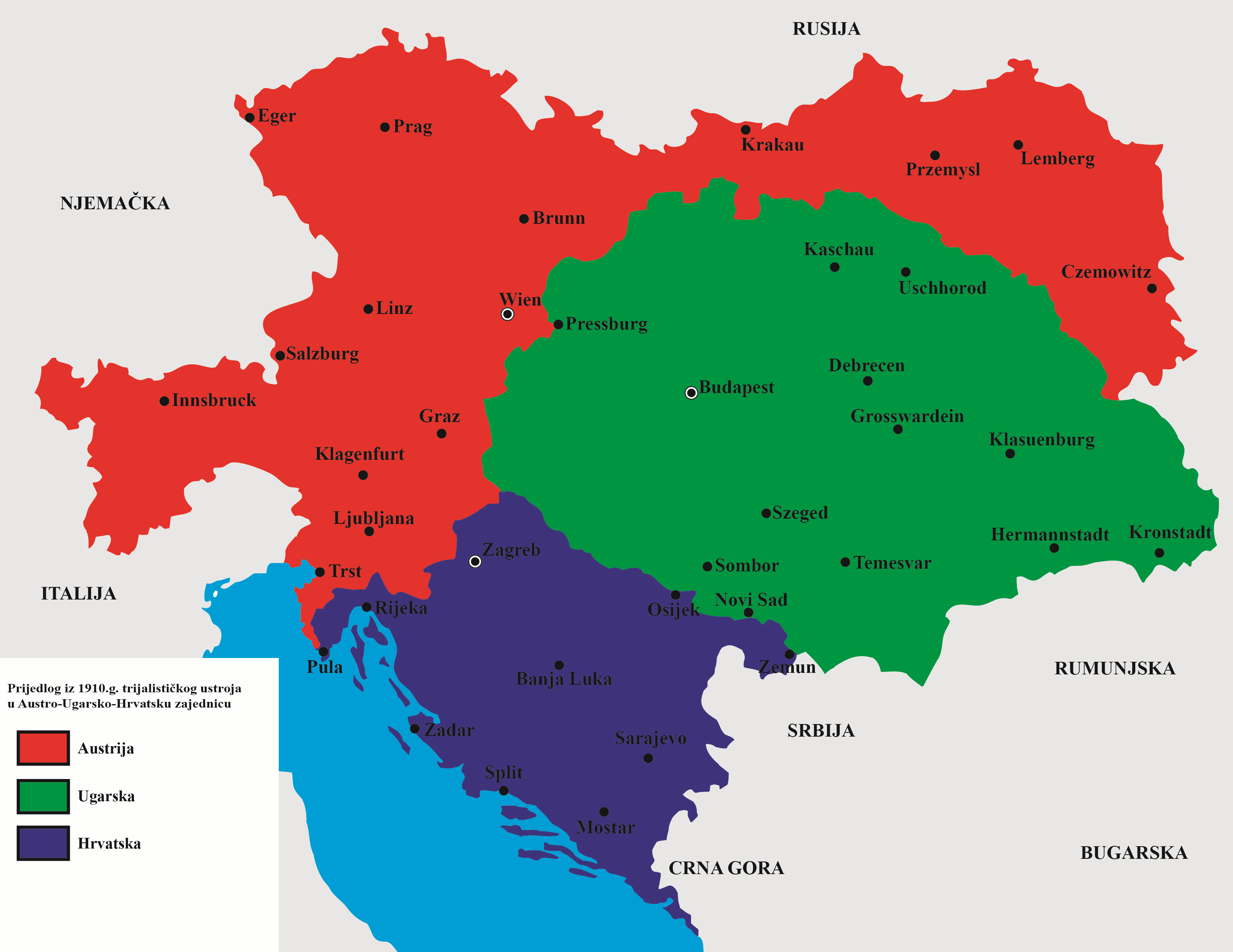
Trialist proposal of uniting only Croatian crown lands, dr. Ivo Pilar 1910

In the history of Austria-Hungary, trialism was the political movement that aimed to reorganize the bipartite Empire into a tripartite one, creating a Slavic state equal in status to Austria and Hungary. Franz Ferdinand promoted trialism before his assassination in 1914 to prevent the Empire from being ripped apart by Slavic dissent. The Empire would be restructured three ways instead of two, with the Slavic element given representation at the highest levels equivalent to what Austria and Hungary had at the time. Serbians saw this as a threat to their dream of a new state of Yugoslavia. Hungarian leaders had a predominant voice in imperial circles and strongly rejected Trialism because it would liberate many of their minorities from Hungarian rule they considered oppressive.

At the end of World War I, its advocates obtained support for a trialist manifesto, but the monarchy as a whole crumbled shortly thereafter.

== History ==
The movement originated in the 1880s in aristocratic and clerical circles of the Empire as a reaction to Hungarian nationalism and must be contrasted to the revolutionary, secessionist Yugoslavism, as Trialism worked within the Habsburg state apparatus with support from Croat politicians and Austrian officials, including the Archduke Franz Ferdinand. The hope of trialist Austrian imperialists was that Serbia might eventually join the great Croatia that was to be created, while putting pressure on the Hungarians and allowing Vienna to continue to dominate the Empire as a whole.

In the early and mid-19th century the movement was Pan-Slavic and demanded that, in addition to the Austrian and Hungarian crowns, a third Slavic crown be established (North Slavs and the South Slavs separately), to allow the empire to resist claims from other Slavic countries and nations (Russia and Serbia).

With the collapse of the early pan-Slavic (Czech-Slovak and Croatian-Slovene-Serb) movements, the new concept of trialism was strictly relegated to Croatia. After the Austro-Hungarian Compromise of 1867 and the Croatian-Hungarian Compromise of 1868 there was great dissatisfaction among the Croatian population that was divided between the two crowns of the empire (Croats in Istria and Dalmatia under the Austrian crown, Croats in Croatia and Slavonia under the Hungarian, and Bosnia-Herzegovina divided between them.) Strong pressure for the reorganization of the empire arose mainly from Croatia-Slavonia and Bosnia-Herzegovina, who since the 1848-49 defeat of the Hungarians had resented their association with them. There were many trialist propositions proposed but the common idea was that the monarchy would be composed of empire of Austria, kingdom of Hungary and kingdom of Croatia.

In Croatia the most prominent advocates of the idea were Dr. Nikola Zvonimir Bjelovučić, author of the book Trialism and the Croatian state, Dr. Ivo Pilar, historian, politician and K.u.K. officer who advocated the idea of trialism in his book The South Slav Question, Dr. Aleksandar Horvat, leader of the pro-monarchy Pure Party of Rights and Croatian delegate at the signing of the trialist treaty in Vienna and Budapest 1918. Other proponents of the idea included General Stjepan Sarkotić, Field marshal Svetozar Borojević, Ivo Prodan, archbishop Josip Štadler, generals Luka Šnjarić and Mihael Mihaljević. Nikola Zvonimir Bjelovučić's proposed trialist monarchy (1911) would be named Austro-Hungaro-Croatian monarchy, and every emperor and king would have to be separately crowned in Austria, Hungary and Croatia. Common affairs in Austro-Hungaro-Croatia would include a ministry of navy headquartered in Pula; an independent army for every state in the monarchy with its own language and officer cadre; a foreign affairs ministry equally staffed and financed by each of the states; and a parliament equally representing each state.

According to Bjelovučić the Croatian kingdom would comprise the Slovene Lands, Istria, Rijeka, Croatia-Slavonia, Dalmatia, Bosnia and Herzegovina. Trieste with western Istria would form an autonomous region in the kingdom. In that region the Italians would be in a political sense equal to Croats. In the Croatian kingdom Croats and Serbs (with Muslims) would enjoy national freedom especially in the local administration. Special provisions would be made for languages, education and religions in the Croatian kingdom. According to Bjelovučić's proposal, Croatia would host a total of six 'Royal Croatian' government ministries.

Among the Habsburg family the supporters of reorganizing the empire from a dualist to a trialist one included Archduke Leopold Salvator who served as an artillery officer in Zagreb 1894–1900, Crown Prince Rudolf who supported federalization of the monarchy, and Archduke Franz Ferdinand, who was the most prominent trialist supporter which made him a great threat to the Serbian nationalists and led to the assassination in Sarajevo. During his short reign Emperor and King Karl I & IV supported the trialist concept and advocated the reorganization of the monarchy.

== World War I ==
Croatian delegations attempted to attain trialism throughout the entire World War I, but even though they had support from emperor Karl I (IV), they were always declined and vetoed by both the Austrian and Hungarian side.

Emperor Karl's manifest of 16 October 1918 was rejected by the declaration of the National Council in Zagreb.

President of the Croatian pro-monarchy political party Pure Party of Rights Dr. Aleksandar Horvat, with parliament members Ivo Frank and Josip Pazman, and generals Luka Šnjarić and Mihael Mihaljević, went to visit king Karl I (IV) on 21 October 1918 in Bad Ischl. Since the king was favorable to the earlier Croatian trialist proposals from 1917, the king agreed and signed the trialist manifest under the proposed terms set by the delegation, on the condition that the Hungarian part does the same since he swore an oath on the integrity of the Hungarian crown. The delegation went the next day to Budapest where it met Count Istvan Tisza and presented the manifest on 22 October 1918 to the Hungarian Council of Ministers led by Hungarian prime minister Sándor Wekerle, who released the king from his oath, and signed the manifest on the creation and unification of all Croatian lands into a single state. After the signing of the manifest, in Zagreb Fran Milobar got a telegram to prepare a public proclamation of the creation of "Zvonimir's kingdom".

According to the Croatian delegation in Budapest after the signing the trialist manifest Count Istva Tisza stated "Ich sehe ein, dass wir gegenüber Kroatien grosse Fehler begangen haben" (I realized that we have made some great mistakes towards Croatia).

After the signing, two parades were held in Zagreb, one for the ending of the dual monarchy, which was held in front of the Croatian National Theater, and another one for saving the trialist monarchy.

The last vote for the support of the trialist reorganization of the empire was, however, too late, as the very next day, on 23 October 1918, the Hungarian prime minister Alexander Wekerle resigned and the council of ministers was deposed.

On 29 October 1918, the Croatian Sabor (parliament), on the basis of a complete right of self-determination which was recognized by all the warring authorities, declared the end of the union and all ties between Hungary and Croatia, and also united all Croatian lands and entered the State of Slovenes, Croats and Serbs.

No act of Sabor dethroned King Karl I, nor did it acknowledge the entering in a state union with Serbia, which is today mentioned in the preamble of the Constitution of Croatia.

== See also ==
- Austro-Slavism
- Czechoslovakia–Yugoslavia relations
- Ethnic federalism
- State of Slovenes, Croats and Serbs
- Triune Kingdom
- Union of Hungary and Romania
- United States of Greater Austria

== Sources ==
- Matijević, Zlatko (2008). "Stranka prava (frankovci) u doba vladavine Narodnoga vijeća Slovenaca, Hrvata i Srba (listopad - prosinac 1918.)". Journal of Contemporary History (in Croatian). 40 (3). Zagreb: Croatian Institute of History.
