= Aleksandar Horvat =

Croatian politician and lawyer (1875 – 1928)

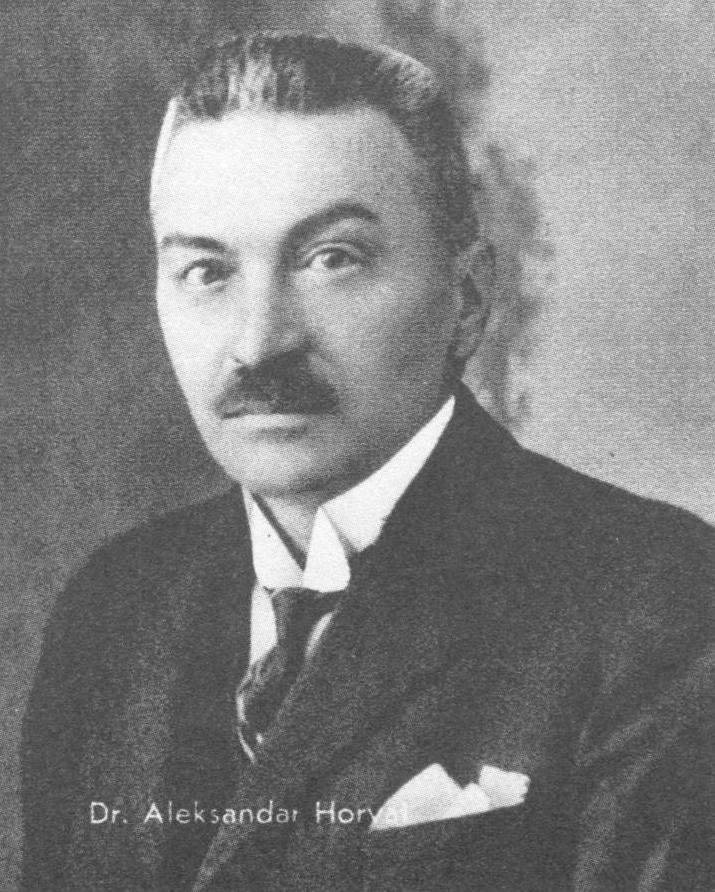
- Born: 6 December 1875; Sutinske Toplice, Kingdom of Croatia-Slavonia, Austria-Hungary
- Died: 8 May 1928 (aged 52); Zagreb, Kingdom of Serbs, Croats, and Slovenes
- Education: University of Vienna
- Occupations: Politician; lawyer
- Political party: Party of Rights; Frankists
- Relatives: Anka Horvat-Gottlieb (wife)

Aleksandar Horvat (6 December 1875 – 8 May 1928) was a Croatian politician and lawyer. During Emperor Franz Joseph's 1895 visit to Zagreb, Horvat took part as a student in a protest in which the Hungarian flag was burned. He joined the Party of Rights, supporting its Frankist wing, successfully running for a seat in the Sabor in multiple parliamentary elections in the Kingdom of Croatia-Slavonia, which was then a part of Austria-Hungary. In addition to politics, Horvat pursued a career in law. He was employed by the law office of Josip Frank, the leader of the Frankists, before becoming an independent lawyer.

Horvat succeeded Frank as the head of the Frankists, becoming a leading figure in the Croatian politics of the early 20th century. Under his leadership, the Frankists hoped to achieve unification of Croatia-Slavonia and Croat-populated lands within Austria-Hungary with support of the military. In that context, Horvat discussed the possibility of the introduction of military rule in those territories. This idea created a conflict between the ruling Croat-Serb Coalition and the Frankists. Horvat submitted an interpellation to the Sabor asking the ruling coalition to respond to reports of violence against captured ethnic-Croatian troops in the Russian Empire, who were pressured to join the Serbs, Croats, and Slovenes Volunteer Corps stationed in the Russian Empire. Horvat briefly left politics in 1918 as a prerequisite for Frankists's inclusion in the National Council of Slovenes, Croats and Serbs, a representative body of Croats, Serbs, and Slovenes living in Austria-Hungary in the context of creation of Yugoslavia as a common state of the South Slavs. Horvat pursued politics again in 1920s, supporting the Croatian Bloc until the Frankists were ejected from the bloc after they started direct negotiations with the Yugoslav government. During the same decade, he unsuccessfully ran in a number of parliamentary elections in the Kingdom of Serbs, Croats, and Slovenes.

== Early life ==
Aleksandar Horvat was born in the village of Sutinske Toplice. He studed law at the University of Zagreb for two years before he was arrested for participation in a Hungarian flag burning on the occasion of the 1895 visit by Emperor Franz Joseph to Zagreb as a member of the Party of Rights youth. Horvat was expelled from the university as well as convicted for the protest and imprisoned for two months in Bjelovar. He continued his study of law at the University of Vienna, and earned his doctorate in law in Zagreb in 1898. Upon graduation, Horvat was employed as a trainee lawyer in Zagreb, in the law office of Josip Frank – the leader of the Pure Party of Rights commonly referred to as the Frankists after the head of the party. In 1903, Horvat became an independent lawyer. (Note: In 1915–1918, Aleksandar Horvat employed Ante Pavelić as his law office clerk.) He married singer Anka Horvat-Gottlieb (née Pisačić).

== Political career ==
=== Leader of the Frankists ===
Horvat joined the Frankists and became a member of the party's executive committee, tasked with drafting the party programme. In 1908, a Frankist faction led by Mile Starčević and Ante Pavelić (elder) split off as an independent party known as the Milinovci. (Note: Formally the Milinovci were called the Starčević's Party of Rights (Starčevićeva stranka prava), but the historiography refers to the party as the Milinovci, eponymously after the first name of its founder.) In 1910, Horvat replaced the ailing Frank as party president.

The Frankists and the Milinovci reconciled and formed a single party named the Party of Rights. (Note: In 1910, the Party of Rights mainstream (also known as Domovinaši), from which the Frankists had split in 1895, merged with the Croatian Progressive Party to form the Croatian United Independent Party, abandoning the name of the Party of Rights.) The party, led by Starčević as the president and Horvat as his deputy, ran in the 1911 parliamentary election, winning 27 seats out of 84. The unification was undertaken with the intention of engaging the ruling Croat-Serb Coalition (HSK) as a potential ally against Hungarian overreach while enlisting the help of the Greater Austrian Circle. (Note: The Greater Austrian Circle of Archduke Franz Ferdinand of Austria achieved influence through appointments of its members: Alois Lexa von Aehrenthal was the Austro-Hungarian foreign minister, Feldmarschall Franz Conrad von Hötzendorf became the chief of the general staff, and Franz Xaver von Schönaich and Moritz von Auffenberg were the ministers of war. Founder of the Frankists, Josip Frank established personal contacts with von Auffenberg.) Cooperation with the HSK ended in 1913 when the coalition reached an agreement with the Hungarian government of István Tisza, and the Frankist and Milinovci factions of the Party of Rights split once more. After the breakup, the Horvat-led Frankists continued to advocate a reform of Austria-Hungary as a federation, while the Milinovci accepted Yugoslavism and supported unification of the South Slavs outside the Habsburg monarchy.

=== Advocation of military rule ===
The 1914 Assassination of Archduke Franz Ferdinand and outbreak of the First World War provided new political prospects for the Frankists. Hoping for postwar rewards, the Frankists supported Austria-Hungary by organising anti-Serbian protests in Croatia. They offered support to both Austria and Hungary as a barrier against potential treason in Croatia. The Frankists designated the HSK as traitors and partially to blame for the assassination. They offered the Tisza government their services and hoped for the introduction of military rule in Croatia that might allow unification of the Croatian lands. (Note: In the context of the Habsburg Monarchy, the term Croatian lands normally refers to the kingdoms of Croatia-Slavonia and Dalmatia, as well as Istria, the city of Rijeka, and Međimurje. These areas largely corresponded to the so-called Triune Kingdom. Founders of the Party of Rights defined the Croatian lands in vague terms since the 1860s. Eugen Kvaternik described it as the area bounded by the Alps, the Danube and Drina rivers, and Albania. Ante Starčević spoke of an even wider area, extending beyond Drina – to the Timok River. In 1918, Ivo Pilar formulated the view accepted by Croat nationalists in the interwar period, defining the Croatian lands as consisting of the Central Croatia, Slavonia, Dalmatia, Istria, and Bosnia and Herzegovina.) This expectation was based on personal relations between Josip Frank's son Ivo and Horvat on one side, and a range of Austro-Hungarian officers on the other. To achieve this, the Frankists secretly urged Tisza to disband the HSK-dominated Sabor.

On 16 July 1914, shortly before the outbreak of the First World War, Horvat and Ivo Frank met with Feldmarschall Franz Conrad von Hötzendorf in Zagreb to discuss the possibility of military rule in the Slavic-inhabited part of the empire. Horvat and other Frankists hoped to achieve unification of the Croatian lands under the military administration. In 1915, the HSK publicly accused Horvat and Ivo Frank of plotting to facilitate the military rule. The accusations were made on the basis of documents found by the police search of an apartment of prominent Frankist politician Vladimir Sachs-Petrović, Horvat and Ivo Frank claimed their signatures found on the incriminating documents were forged. Horvat and von Hötzendorf met once again in late 1915 to discuss helping the Frankists come to power in Croatia-Slavonia. In late October 1918, Horvat, accompanied by Ivo Frank and Josip Pazman, met Emperor Charles I of Austria and the new Hungarian prime minister Sándor Wekerle to obtain their support for an independent and unified Croatia within the Empire. While the emperor and Wekerle gave support to the idea, the dissolution of Austria-Hungary made it irrelevant.

=== Sabor interpellaton ===
On 6 July 1918, Horvat submitted an interpellation to the Sabor concerning events in the Serbs, Croats, and Slovenes Volunteer Corps stationed in the Russian Empire. The force was the result of an initiative of the Yugoslav Committee, and ad-hoc group claiming to represent South Slavs living in Austria-Hungary. The committee advocated Yugoslavism and establishment of a "Yugoslav" armed force, distinct from, but within the structure of the Royal Serbian Army. The proposal specified that it should consist of volunteers recruited among the Austro-Hungarian prisoners of war in Russia. Most non-Serb troops were forcibly conscripted. Contemporary sources reported widespread beatings and death threats used to coerce the prisoners into service. According to historian Ivo Banac, the Royal Serbian Army officers treated the corps as an integral part of Serbian armed forces and threatened death penalty for anyone who espoused Yugoslavism instead of pledging loyalty to the Kingdom of Serbia. The interpellation inquired about the HSK's position about the violence including a documented case of summary execution of 13 ethnic-Croatian troops in Odesa. In his interpellation, Horvat spoke of tens of thousands of Croatian soldiers killed in Odesa.

=== Retirement ===
In October 1918, as the idea of creation of Yugoslavia as a common state of South Slavs gained momentum in the course of First World War defeat and dissolution of Austria-Hungary, most political parties representing Croats, Serbs, and Slovenes living in Austria-Hungary established the National Council of Slovenes, Croats and Serbs as a representative body seeking independence from the Empire. The council was led by Slovene People's Party leader Anton Korošec, Serb Independent Party leader Svetozar Pribićević, and Pavelić (elder). The Frankists disagreed with the majority of the National Council, but wished to join regardless. The National Council's negotiators required the Frankists to commit their support to unification with Serbia as well as to expel Horvat—prompting him to announce retirement from politics. Leadership of the Frankists was succeeded by Vladimir Prebeg. Days after the creation of Yugoslavia, Horvat was arrested and held in custody without trial for six months following the 1918 protest in Zagreb.

Horvat came out of his political retirement in 1921 to support the Stjepan Radić led Croatian Bloc coalition. In 1924, he was a signatory, along with Prebeg and Slavko Kvaternik, of a memorandum addressed to the Yugoslav government of Nikola Pašić. The memorandum proposed granting of a degree of autonomy to Croatia within the framework of the Kingdom of Serbs, Croats, and Slovenes as well as the separate crowning of Alexander I of Yugoslavia as king of Croatia in Zagreb. The negotiations taken on the basis of the memorandum prompted Radić to eject the Frankists from the coalition. Even though the negotiations were previously confirmed to the press by Horvat, he subequently published a statement to deny that the talks took place. Horvat unsuccessfully ran in 1923, 1925, and 1927 Yugoslav parliamentary elections.

== Sources ==
- Banac, Ivo (1984). The National Question in Yugoslavia: Origins, History, Politics. Ithaca, New York: Cornell University Press. ISBN 0-8014-1675-2.
- Bartulin, Nevenko (2012). "From Independence to Trialism: The Croatian Party of Right and the Project for a Liberal "Greater Croatia" within the Habsburg Empire, 1861–1914". In Fitzpatrick, Matthew P. (ed.). Liberal Imperialism in Europe. London: Palgrave Macmillan. pp. 115–140. ISBN 978-1-349-43739-9.
- Bellamy, Alex J. (2003). The Formation of Croatian National Identity: A Centuries-old Dream. Manchester: Manchester University Press. ISBN 9780719065026.
- Biondich, Mark (2000). Stjepan Radić, the Croat Peasant Party, and the Politics of Mass Mobilization, 1904-1928. Toronto: University of Toronto Press. ISBN 0-8020-4727-0.
- Dizdar, Zdravko; Grčić, Marko; Ravlić, Slaven; Stuparić, Darko, eds. (1997). Tko je tko u NDH [Who Is Who in the NDH] (in Croatian). Zagreb: Minerva. ISBN 978-953-6377-03-9.
- Duančić, Vedran (2020). Geography and Nationalist Visions of Interwar Yugoslavia. London: Palgrave Macmillan. ISBN 9783030502584.
- Fuerst-Bjeliš, Borna; Glamuzina, Nikola (2021). The Historical Geography of Croatia; Territorial Change and Cultural Landscapes. Cham: Springer. ISBN 978-3-030-68432-7.
- Gabelica, Mislav (2014). "Između Scile i Haribde: političko djelovanje Stranke prava (frankovaca) početkom Prvoga svjetskog rata (od srpnja 1914. do konca 1915. godine)" [Between Scylla and Charybdis: The Political Activity of the Party of Rights (Frankists) at the Beginning of World War I (from July 1914 to the End of 1915)]. Pilar : časopis za društvene i humanističke studije (in Croatian). IX (17–18). Zagreb: Ivo Pilar Institute of Social Sciences: 9–41. ISSN 1846-3010.
- Hoare, Marko Attila (2024). Serbia: A Modern History. London: Hurst Publishers. ISBN 9781805261575.
- Knez, Luka (2017). "Odessa – san ili stvarnost izgubljenih Hrvata" [Odesa – Dream or Reality of Lost Croats]. Rostra : Časopis studenata povijesti Sveučilišta u Zadru (in Croatian). 8 (8). Zadar: University of Zadar: 163–181. ISSN 2459-7716.
- Matijević, Zlatko (2008a). "Stranka prava (frankovci) u doba vladavine Narodnoga vijeća Slovenaca, Hrvata i Srba (listopad – prosinac 1918.)" [The Party of Right (Frankists) During the Rule of the National Council of the Slovenes, Croats, and Serbs (October – December 1918)]. Časopis za suvremenu povijest (in Croatian). 40 (3). Zagreb: Croatian Institute of History: 1105–1118. ISSN 0590-9597.
- Matijević, Zlatko (2008b). "The National Council of Slovenes, Croats and Serbs in Zagreb (1918/1919)". Review of Croatian History. 4 (1). Zagreb: Hrvatski institut za povijest: 51–84. ISSN 1845-4380.
- Matković, Hrvoje (1962). "Veze između frankovaca i radikala od 1922–1925" [Links between the Frankists and the Radicals, 1922–1925]. Historijski zbornik (in Croatian). 15 (1–4). Zagreb: Društvo za hrvatsku povjesnicu: 41–59. ISSN 0351-2193.
- Matković, Hrvoje (2000). "Stjepan Radić i Hrvatski blok" [Stjepan Radić and the Croatian Block]. Radovi Zavoda za hrvatsku povijest Filozofskoga fakulteta Sveučilišta u Zagrebu: Radovi Zavoda za hrvatsku povijest Filozofskoga fakulteta Sveučilišta u Zagrebu (in Croatian). 32–33 (1). Zagreb: University of Zagreb: 267–276. ISSN 0353-295X.
- Matković, Stjepan (2008). "Prilozi za politički životopis Ive Franka i evoluciju pravaštva" [Contributions for a Political Biography of Ivo Frank and Evolution of the Party of Right's Ideology]. Časopis za suvremenu povijest (in Croatian). 40 (3). Zagreb: Hrvatski institut za povijest: 1067–1086. ISSN 0590-9597.
- Newman, John Paul (2015). Yugoslavia in the Shadow of War: Veterans and the Limits of State Building, 1903–1945. Cambridge: Cambridge University Press. ISBN 978-1-107-07076-9.
- Ramet, Sabrina P. (2006). The Three Yugoslavias: State-Building and Legitimation, 1918–2005. Bloomington: Indiana University Press. ISBN 978-0-253-34656-8.
- Švab, Mladen; Matković, Stjepan (2002). "Horvat, Aleksandar". Croatian Biographical Lexicon (in Croatian). Miroslav Krleža Institute of Lexicography.
- Veselinović, Velimir (2018). "Pregled razvoja pravaške ideologije i politike" [An Overview of the Development of Rightist Ideology and Politics]. Časopis za suvremenu povijest (in Croatian). 50 (3). Zagreb: Croatian Institute of History: 583–620. ISSN 0590-9597.
