= Croatian Committee =

Croatian revolutionary organisation created in 1920

Croatian Committee Hrvatski komitet
- Leader: Ivo Frank
- Founded: May 1919
- Dissolved: 1920
- Split from: Pure Party of Rights
- Headquarters: Graz (1919); Vienna (1919–March 1920); Budapest (March 1920)
- Ideology: Croatian nationalism Anti-Serb sentiment

The Croatian Committee (Croatian: Hrvatski komitet) (Note: Croatian sources refer to the Croatian Committee using various names including Hrvatski komitet, Hrvatski emigrantski komitet (lit. 'Croatian Émigré Committee'), Hrvatski emigrantski odbor (lit. 'Croatian Émigré Board'), Hrvatski emigrantski revolucionarni komitet (lit. 'Croatian Émigré Revolutionary Committee'), Hrvatski oslobodilački pokret (lit. 'Croatian Liberation Movement'), and emigrantska Frankovačka stranka (lit. 'Émigré Frankist Party')) was a Croatian political organization, formed in the summer of 1919, by émigré Frankist politicians and members of the former Austro-Hungarian Army. The organization opposed the creation of the Kingdom of Serbs, Croats and Slovenes (later renamed Yugoslavia) and aimed to achieve Croatia's independence. The Croatian Committee was established in Graz, Austria, before its headquarters were moved to Vienna and then to Budapest, Hungary. It was led by Ivo Frank.

Frank received aid from the Kingdom of Italy seeking to destabilize Yugoslavia before the Paris Peace Conference and bilateral negotiations regarding their mutual border. The issue was contentious because Italian territorial claims, largely based on the Treaty of London, conflicted with Yugoslavia's interests, which relied on the right of self-determination. The Croatian Committee concluded a number of agreements with Gabriele D'Annunzio who had seized the city of Rijeka (Fiume), attempting to resolve the Fiume question in favour of Italy. Furthermore, the Croatian Committee established cooperation with other groups fighting to destabilize Yugoslavia such as the Internal Macedonian Revolutionary Organization. The Croatian Committee established the Croatian Legion, estimated at 100 to 300 troops, as its armed wing headquartered in Hungary.

The Croatian Committee was dissolved in 1920, after the Yugoslav authorities learned of the group's activities and sent letters to Austrian and Hungarian governments protesting further Committee activities on their soil. This was enough to force the group to cease its operations. Italy also cut its support to the Croatian Committee after signing the Treaty of Rapallo the same year, defining the Italian–Yugoslav border. Several people, including Milan Šufflay and Ivo Pilar, were tried on charges of treason in Yugoslavia because of contacts with the Croatian Committee.

After the dissolution of the Croatian Committee, Frank and later leader of the fascist Ustaše Ante Pavelić jointly wrote a letter to Benito Mussolini seeking support for Croatian independence. Two years later, Frank's influence among the Croatian political émigrés was eclipsed by the rise of the Ustaše. Before founding the Ustaše, Pavelić first consulted a number of former Croatian Committee members, but not Frank. He initially endorsed the Ustaše, but distanced himself from Pavelić following the 1934 Marseilles assassination of king Alexander I of Yugoslavia.

== Background ==
In 1915, the Kingdom of Italy entered World War I on the side of the Entente, following the signing of the Treaty of London, which promised Italy territorial gains at the expense of Austria-Hungary. Representatives of the South Slavs living in Austria-Hungary, who were organized as the Yugoslav Committee, opposed the treaty. Following the 3 November 1918 Armistice of Villa Giusti between the Entente and Austria-Hungary, Italian troops moved to occupy parts of the eastern Adriatic shore promised to Italy under the Treaty of London, ahead of the Paris Peace Conference. The State of Slovenes, Croats and Serbs, carved from areas of Austria-Hungary populated by the southern Slavs (encompassing the Slovene lands, Croatia-Slavonia, Dalmatia, and Bosnia and Herzegovina), authorized the Yugoslav Committee to represent it abroad. The short-lived state laid a competing claim to the eastern Adriatic to counter the Italian demands. This claim, relying on the principle of self-determination, was supported by deployment of the Royal Serbian Army to the area. The creation of the Kingdom of Serbs, Croats and Slovenes (later renamed Yugoslavia) was formally announced on 1 December. The proclamation of a unified state encompassing the State of Slovenes, Croats and Serbs and the Kingdom of Serbia was made by Prince Regent Alexander of Serbia following a meeting with a delegation of the State of Slovenes, Croats and Serbs. The delegation was instructed to ask for unification in a federal state, but it disregarded the instructions and nothing was said of the system of government in the meeting or the announcement of the unification.

== Finzi's plan ==
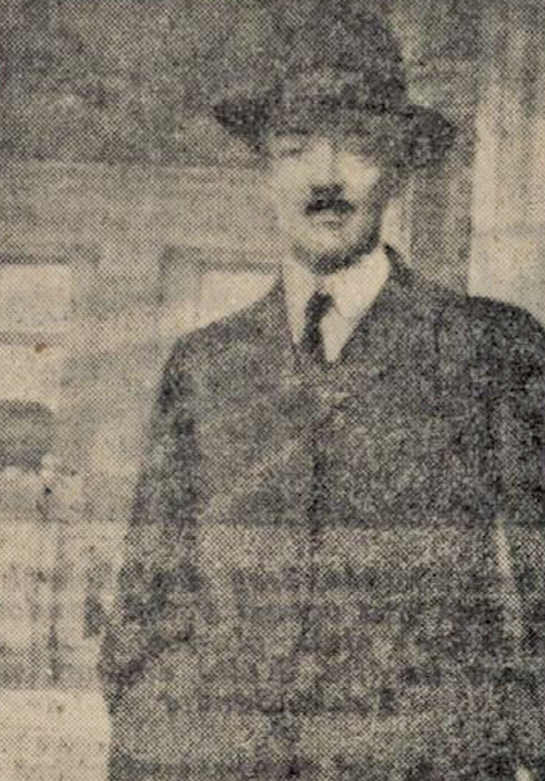
Ivo Frank (photographed in 1934)

In late November 1918, General Pietro Badoglio received a plan for propaganda activities designed to hinder the consolidation of Yugoslavia. The plan was devised by Lieutenant Colonel Cesare Pettorelli Lalatta Finzi, the chief of the Information Office in the Occupied Territories (Italian: Informazioni Territori Occupati, ITO) in Trieste. Finzi's plan envisaged stoking anti-Serbian sentiment in Croatia, Slovenia, Bosnia and Herzegovina, Montenegro, and Vardar Macedonia to promote separatist ideas. The plan provided for a substantial budget and 200 agents. Badoglio submitted the plan for approval, which Foreign Minister Sydney Sonnino, Prime Minister Vittorio Emanuele Orlando and chief of staff Marshal Armando Diaz granted on 9 December.

Finzi founded a secret unit in Budapest to establish and maintain contacts with and support opponents of Yugoslavia. Finzi first came into contact with Stjepan Radić, the leader of the Croatian Peasant Party (Croatian: Hrvatska seljačka stranka, HSS). Sonnino planned to bring Radić to the Paris Peace Conference to advocate Croatian interests, but Yugoslav authorities arrested the entire HSS leadership. Acting on Radić's urging, Sonnino unsuccessfully lobbied the United Kingdom, France, and the United States in support of Croatia's greater independence.

Finzi also contacted Ivo Frank, who requested Italian assistance in pursuit of his political objectives, promising in return to recognize Italian territorial claims under the Treaty of London. Frank, as well as a number of members of the Frankist faction of the Party of Rights, (Note: The Frankists were named after Josip Frank, Ivo's father, who founded the Pure Party of Rights after his faction of the Party of Rights splintered from the main part of the party of Ante Starčević in 1895.) had been previously briefly arrested in relation to the protest of Croatian Home Guard soldiers in Zagreb. Frankists were excluded from participation in the Temporary National Representation (the interim parliament) in February 1919. Faction leaders Vladimir Prebeg and Josip Pazman were arrested for sending the Frankists' political programme advocating for an independent Croatia to the Paris Peace Conference.

== Establishment ==
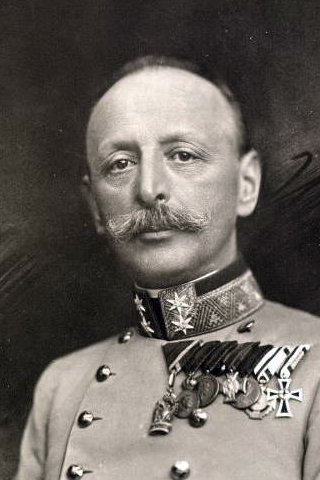
Stjepan Sarkotić led an informal group within the Croatian Committee.

Frank and a number of other Frankists (including a member of Party of Rights leadership, Vladimir Sachs-Petrović) went into exile in Italy, Hungary, or Austria. Historian Jozo Tomasevich described Frank as the only person of significant standing in Croatian political emigration in the aftermath of World War I. In May 1919, they formed the nationalist Croatian Committee in Graz, Austria, joined by a number of former Austro-Hungarian Army officers, NCOs, and police officers including Generaloberst Stjepan Sarkotić, Lieutenant Colonel Stephan Duić, Emanuel Gagliardi, Niko Petričević, Major Vilim Stipetić, and Beno Klobučarić. Historian John Paul Newman stated that Gagliardi, Stipetić, and Klobučarić first formed the Croatian Committee. Italian authors Pino Adriano and Giorgio Cingolani indicated that the founders were Frank, Sachs-Petrović, Duić, and Gagliardi.

Frank led the Croatian Committee whose objective was to obtain independence of Croatia from Yugoslavia. For this purpose, it intended to gather support in Croatia by spreading and amplifying anti-Serbian sentiment relying on discontent with the conditions of creating Yugoslavia. The organization's headquarters were first moved to Vienna and then, after Miklós Horthy's rule was established in Hungary, the Committee moved to Budapest.

== International collaboration ==
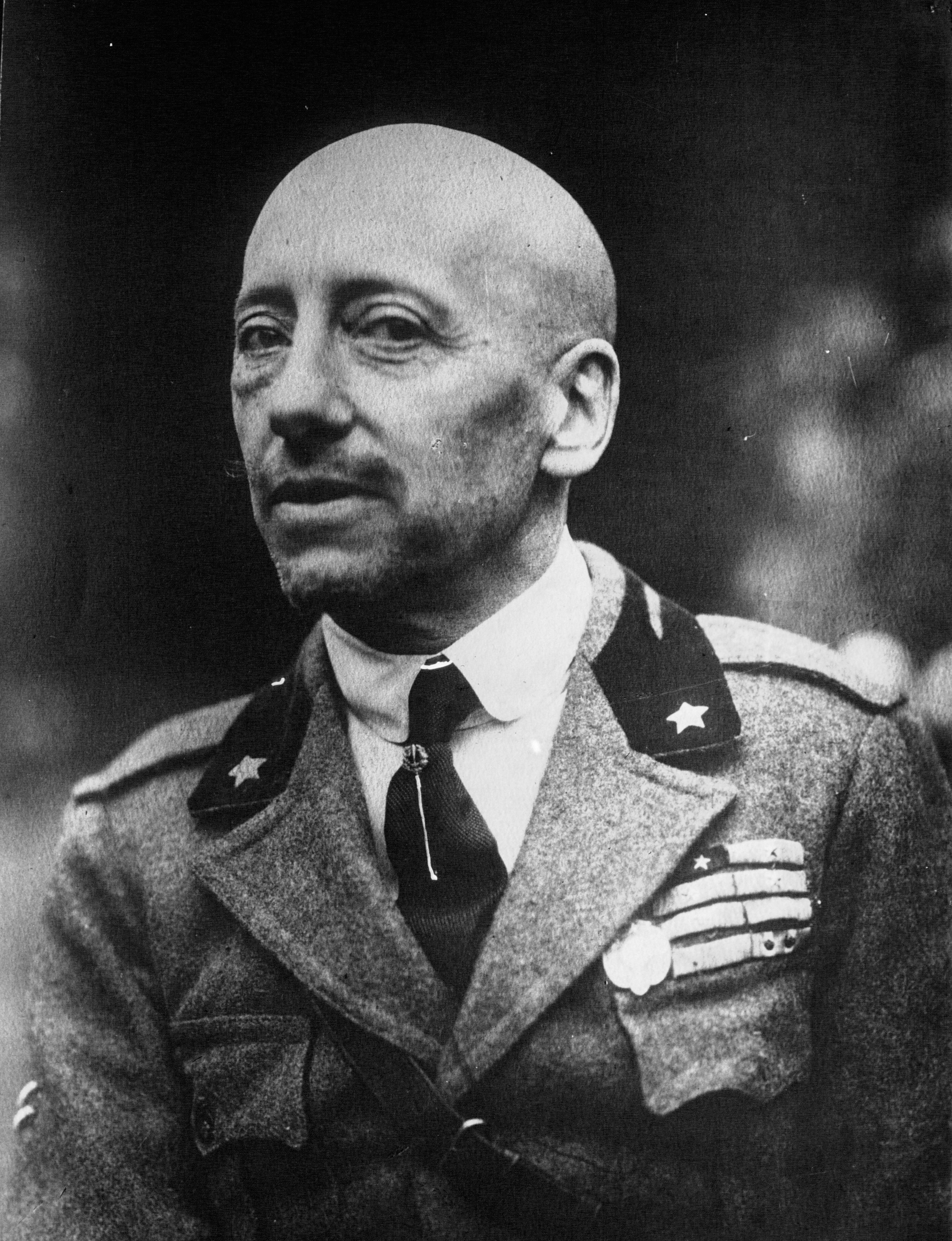
Gabrielle D'Annunzio (pictured) and Ivo Frank concluded political alliance in 1920.

Frank sought support from Gabriele D'Annunzio who had seized the city of Rijeka (Italian: Fiume) attempting to impose a solution of the so-called Fiume question. Frank also contacted Italian fascists regarding potential alliances. Cooperation with D'Annunzio was first formalized on 5 July 1920, when Frank and Gagliardi met with D'Annunzio's representatives, Giovanni Host-Venturi and Giovanni Giuriati, in Venice and signed two agreements. The first promised money and arms to Croatian émigrés. The second agreement dealt with the borders of the future Croatian republic, which was envisioned as generally corresponding to the former Kingdom of Croatia-Slavonia. The agreement defined Italian territorial gains around Rijeka and some Adriatic islands. The largest Dalmatian cities were to become politically autonomous free ports. Namely, Zadar, Šibenik, Trogir, Split, and Dubrovnik were to form an independent, loose federation or a "maritime alliance". The rest of Dalmatia would be organized as a separate republic. The Dalmatian republic was to decide on joining the Croatian republic in a plebiscite. According to American historian Jozo Tomasevich, D'Annunzio was acting as a proxy of Italy. At the time, Italy supported multiple organisations opposing the Yugoslav state. These included the Croatian Committee, as well as Albanian Kachak Movement, Montenegrin pro-independence Greens and the Internal Macedonian Revolutionary Organization (IMRO). When D'Annunzio organized a meeting in Rijeka in 1920 aimed at establishing an alternative League of Nations for politically oppressed peoples, Frank attended and signed an alliance agreement with D'Annunzio.

The Croatian Committee drew inspiration from D'Annunzio's actions and planned to replicate the flight over Vienna in Zagreb. It also maintained contacts with the former emperor, Charles I of Austria who was in Switzerland at the time, and contacts established with Albanian anti-Yugoslav forces. Yugoslav military intelligence accused Frank and the Croatian Committee of conspiring with unknown Hungarians to secure Hungarian takeover of Bačka, Banat, and Baranya regions in return for renunciation of Hungarian claims regarding Međimurje.

== Croatian Legion ==
The Croatian Committee established a small, volunteer military wing in Hungary named the Croatian Legion. It was meant to deploy to Croatia in case of an invasion or a revolution. Members were largely recruited from Italian prisoner-of-war camps by Duić, whose visits to the camps were permitted by Italian authorities. Furthermore, the Croatian Legion was supplied with arms through the Italian ambassador to Austria. The force was based in Hungary, initially in the town of Kőszeg, and later in Zalaegerszeg. The Croatian Committee announced the existence of its military wing in November 1919, claiming it was 300,000 members. Yugoslav intelligence estimated their true number to be 300, while Sachs-Petrović indicated there were about a hundred in the ranks of the Croatian Legion. The force was initially commanded by Major Gojkomir Glogovac and then by Captain Josip Metzger.

== Dissolution ==
The Croatian Committee's activities ended in 1920 after Yugoslav authorities learned of the group's contacts abroad. Yugoslavia sent letters of protest to Austria and Hungary that caused the Austrian and Hungarian authorities to shut down the group's operations. Similarly, Italian support for the Croatian Committee ended after the Treaty of Rapallo, which defined the Italian-Yugoslav border, concluded in late 1920.

Gagliardi provided Yugoslav authorities information on Croatian Committee members and returned to Yugoslavia in 1922. He published a paper on the Croatian Committee, paid by Yugoslav interior minister Svetozar Pribićević. According to Frank's wife Aglaja, Gagliardi was constantly supplying information on the Croatian Committee and its foreign contacts to the Yugoslav authorities.

A group of Frankists was arrested in Zagreb on charges of treason, suspected of maintaining contacts with the Croatian Committee. The most prominent among them were Ivo Pilar and Milan Šufflay. They were tried in 1921, in what became a Croatian cause célèbre with defence led by another Frankist, lawyer Ante Pavelić. Šufflay was convicted and imprisoned for three years; Pilar was also convicted, but he received a two-month suspended prison sentence.

== Legacy ==
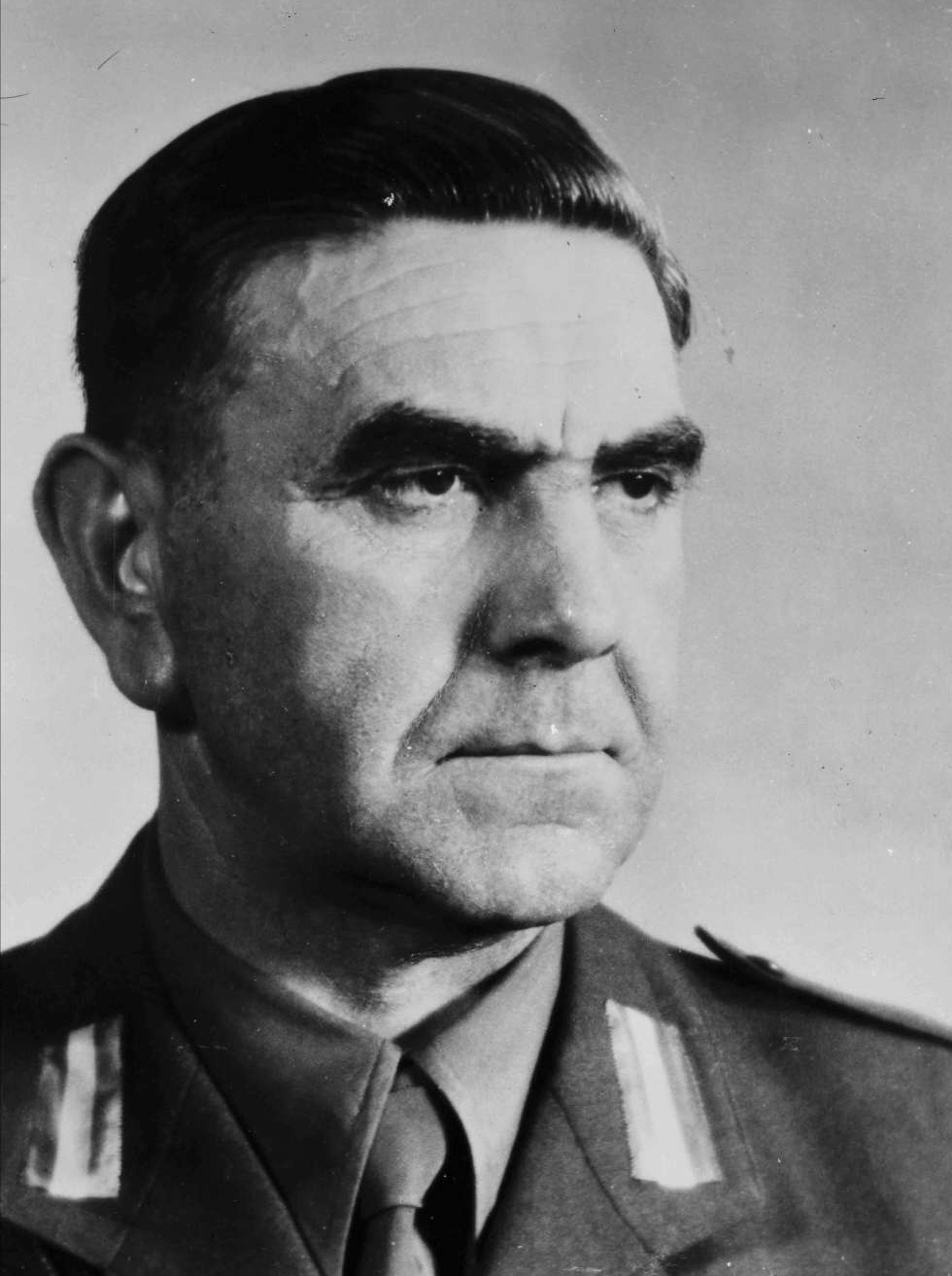
Ante Pavelić was the defence lawyer for the Frankists charged with treason in 1921.

The Croatian Committee never posed a real threat to Yugoslavia. Its former members continued to cooperate with the armed groups once supported by Italy against Yugoslavia. In one such instance, former members of the then defunct Croatian Legion conspired with the IMRO to assassinate king Alexander I of Yugoslavia in 1922 during his wedding celebration. The plot was abandoned after Yugoslav authorities learned about the conspiracy.

The group's failure contributed to the concept of the "Croatian culture of defeat". This was the result of portraying the creation of Yugoslavia as a defeat and betrayal of wartime sacrifice perpetrated by Croat members of the National Council of Slovenes, Croats and Serbs, the central organ of the short-lived State of Slovenes, Croats and Serbs. The "Croatian culture of defeat" was later used by Pavelić to develop a radical programme to avenge the perceived defeat and betrayal of 1918, i.e. the creation of Yugoslavia. Frank and Pavelić jointly wrote a letter to Benito Mussolini in 1927 seeking Italian support for Croatian independence while promising Croatia would be within the Italian sphere of influence. The influence Frank had among the Croatian political émigrés was eclipsed by the rise of the Pavelić-led fascist Ustaše in 1929. In the early 1930s, Frank endorsed the Ustaše, but distanced himself from them in 1934. This was because Frank resented Pavelić's decision to include Frank's nephew Dido Kvaternik in organisation of the 1934 Marseilles assassination of king Alexander.

Sarkotić and Duić, together with Lieutenant Colonel Ivan Perčević von Odavna formed the core an informal "Sarkotić Group". The group continued to informally meet in the 1920s to pursue politics, maintaining communication with Pavelić and Radić. According to Gagliardi, the split with Frank came about when Duić accused Frank and Sachs-Petrović of misappropriation of the Croatian Committee's funds. When Pavelić left Yugoslavia in 1929, shortly before establishing the Ustaše, he first visited the Sarkotić Group in Vienna. Gagliardi was among the first to join the Ustaše. He was summarily executed by the Ustaše in 1942.

== Sources ==
- Adriano, Pino; Cingolani, Giorgio (2018). Nationalism and Terror: Ante Pavelić and Ustasha Terrorism from Fascism to the Cold War. Budapest: Central European University Press. ISBN 9789633862063.
- Banac, Ivo (1984). The National Question in Yugoslavia: Origins, History, Politics. Ithaca: Cornell University Press. ISBN 0-8014-1675-2.
- Gabelica, Mislav (2022). "Društvo odlikovanih ratnika Hrvata 1914-1918. Prilog istraživanju odnosa Nezavisne Države Hrvatske prema Prvom svjetskom ratu" [Society of Decorated Croat Warriors 1914-1918. An addition to the research on the attitude of the Independent State of Croatia to the First World War]. Historijski zbornik (in Croatian). 75 (2). Zagreb: Društvo za hrvatsku povjesnicu: 241–262. ISSN 0351-2193.
- Gagliardi, Emanuel (1922). "Istina o hrvatskom emigrantskom revolucionarnom komiteu 1919–21" [Truth About the Croatian Emigre Revolutionary Committee 1919–1921] (in Croatian).
- Ivašković, Igor (2020). "Polemike o statusu države i kraljevine SHS" [Debate on the Status of the State of the Slovenes, Croats and Serbs and the Kingdom of Serbs, Croats and Slovenes]. Pravni vjesnik (in Croatian). 36 (3–4). Osijek: University of Osijek: 269–288. ISSN 0352-5317.
- Jonjić, Tomislav (2007). "Dr. Ivo Pilar — odvjetnik u Tuzli (1905.-1920.)" [Dr. Ivo Pilar – A Lawyer in Tuzla (1905–1920)]. Pilar: časopis za društvene i humanističke studije (in Croatian). II (3). Zagreb: Institut društvenih znanosti Ivo Pilar: 11–44. ISSN 1846-3010.
- Kolstø, Pål (2005). Myths and Boundaries in South-eastern Europe. London: Hurst & Company. ISBN 978-1-85065-772-9.
- van der Kiste, John (2003). Crowns in a Changing World: The British and European Monarchies, 1901-36. Cheltenham: The History Press. ISBN 978-0-7524-9927-7.
- Matijević, Zlatko (2008). "The National Council of Slovenes, Croats and Serbs in Zagreb (1918/1919)". Review of Croatian History. 4 (1). Zagreb: Hrvatski institut za povijest: 51–84. ISSN 1845-4380.
- Matković, Stjepan (2008). "Prilozi za politički životopis Ive Franka i evoluciju pravaštva" [Contributions for a Political Biography of Ivo Frank and Evolution of the Party of Right's Ideology]. Časopis za suvremenu povijest (in Croatian). 40 (3). Zagreb: Croatian Institute of History: 1067–1086. ISSN 0590-9597.
- Newman, John Paul (2012). "The Origins, Attributes, and Legacies of Paramilitary Violence in the Balkans". In Gerwarth, Robert; Horne, John (eds.). War in Peace: Paramilitary Violence in Europe After the Great War. ACLS Humanities E-Book. Oxford: Oxford University Press. ISBN 978-0-19-965491-8.
- Newman, John Paul (2015). Yugoslavia in the Shadow of War: Veterans and the Limits of State Building, 1903–1945. Cambridge: Cambridge University Press. ISBN 978-1-107-07076-9.
- Pavlowitch, Kosta St. (2003). "The First World War and Unification of Yugoslavia". In Djokic, Dejan (ed.). Yugoslavism: Histories of a Failed Idea, 1918–1992. London: C. Hurst & Co. pp. 27–41. ISBN 1-85065-663-0.
- Ramet, Sabrina P. (2006). The Three Yugoslavias: State-building and Legitimation, 1918–2005. Bloomington: Indiana University Press. ISBN 9780253346568.
- Tomas, Domagoj; Njari, Denis (2022). "Ivo Frank i revizija Trianonskoga ugovora" [Ivo Frank and the Revision of the Treaty of Trianon]. Časopis za suvremenu povijest (in Croatian). 54 (2). Zagreb: Hrvatski institut za povijest: 421–443. doi:10.22586/csp.v54i2.21227. ISSN 0590-9597.
- Tomasevich, Jozo (2002). War and Revolution in Yugoslavia, 1941–1945: Occupation and Collaboration. Stanford, California: Stanford University Press. ISBN 978-0-8047-0857-9.
