= Mile Starčević =

Mile Starčević may refer to:

- Mile Starčević (politician, born 1862), Croatian politician
- Mile Starčević (politician, born 1904), Croatian politician
