= Vladimir Sachs-Petrović =

Croatian politician and lawyer (born 1879)

- Born: 5 July 1879; Zagreb, Kingdom of Croatia-Slavonia, Austria-Hungary (now Croatia)
- Died: in 1941–1945 in one of concentration camps in the Independent State of Croatia
- Education: University of Zagreb
- Occupation: Politician
- Political party: Party of Rights

Vladimir Sachs-Petrović (5 July 1879 – 1941–1945) was a Jewish-Croatian politician and lawyer. Sachs-Petrović obtained doctoral degree from the Faculty of Law, University of Zagreb in 1905. He was a prominent member of the Party of Rights.

Born in Zagreb to a family of Jewish origin, despite that Sachs-Petrović publicly argued that "Jews are not a nation, but Croats of Moses' faith". Sachs-Petrović was arrested on the day of the 1918 protest in Zagreb, as a leading figure of the Frankist faction of the Party of Rights. In early 1919, after establishment of the Kingdom of Serbs, Croats and Slovenes (KSCS), he was arrested as a Croatian nationalist and briefly imprisoned. By 1920, Sachs-Petrović moved to Italy where he established a law firm. While in Italy, he joined the Croatian Committee. The organisation aimed at destruction of the KSCS was led by Ivo Frank and, at the time, included Generaloberst Stjepan Sarkotić, Lieutenant Colonel Stephan Duić, Emanuel Gagliardi, Niko Petričević, Vilim Stipetić, and Beno Klobučarić.

Sachs-Petrović, along with Frank, was the co-signatory of an agreement with Gabriele D'Annunzio, offering to turn over territory along Dalmatian coast of the Adriatic Sea to Italy in return for assistance in seizing power in Croatia. In 1922–1923, Sachs-Petrović was in the United States lobbying officials and private donors to support Montenegrin rebels. In 1924, Sachs-Petrović and Frank signed the Balkan Federation agreement with representatives of the Internal Macedonian Revolutionary Organization, Montenegrin and Kosovo rebels in Vienna. The signing was hosted by Dimitar Vlahov and supported by the Soviet Union. Sachs-Petrović was accused of embezzling the money received from D'Annunzio and funding Ante Pavelić after he emigrated from the KSCS in 1929, as well as of working for the KSCS police. After establishment of the Banovina of Croatia within the KSCS in 1939, Sachs-Petrović returned to Zagreb. Following Axis Invasion of Yugoslavia in April 1941, and establishment of the puppet Independent State of Croatia, Sachs-Petrović requested the authorities to exempt him and his wife Elza from wearing the yellow badge on account of his prior work for the Croatian cause. His request was granted in May when he was awarded the honorary Aryan status. Nonetheless, before the end of the war in 1945, both he and his wife were taken away, presumably to one of concentration camps in the Independent State of Croatia and killed.
