= Alexander family =

- Family
- Current region: Zagreb, Croatia
- Origin: Güssing, Austria
- Members: Samuel Alexander; Julija Alexander (née Rubin alias Fittel Neumann); Zora Marić (born Alexander); Gjuro (Đuro/Duka) Alexander; Otto Alexander; Zlata/Aurelija Breyer (born Alexander); Ilka Alexander
- Many members of the family perished during the Holocaust; some descendants still bear the surname Alexander.

The Alexander family was a prominent Croatian Jewish family from Zagreb. Alexander family ancestors moved to Zagreb from Güssing in Austria. For a century, the family played an important role in the economic and social life of Zagreb. Until 1941 and the establishment of the Independent State of Croatia the Alexanders were a large clan.

The great-grandparents of the Zagreb Alexanders were Samuel and Julija (née Rubin alias Fittel Neumann) Alexander, who had five sons and several daughters. Counting all of their deceased and still living members, including also the descendants of the female line, there were 224 Alexanders in seven generations. Many members of the family perished during the Holocaust. Today a few descendants bear the surname Alexander.

The members of the family who were murdered during the Holocaust:

Zora Marić born Alexander (1895-1944 Auschwitz), and her husband Artur Marić (born Mayer; Zagreb, 1889 – Petrinja, 1941); Gjuro (Đuro/Duka) Alexander (1895-1941), his wife Ines born Altstätter (1896-1941) and their son Miljenko (1924-1941); Otto Alexander (1883-1944) and his mother-in-law Frieda Weiss (-1944); Zlata/Aurelija Breyer born Alexander (1875-1942) and her husband Žiga (=Sigismund) Breyer (b. in Križevci, Croatia; 1866–1942); Stanko Kreč (-1941);Ella Boran-Plachte born Marić (1893-1943) and her second husband Dr. Filip Boran (Bornstein; -1943); Ilka Alexander (1869-1942 Jasenovac concentration camp) and Otto Vinski (1877-1942 Jasenovac concentration camp).

== Members ==
- Samuel David Alexander (1862–1943)
- Šandor Alexander (1866–1929)
- Viktor Alexander (1865–1934)
- Oskar Alexander (1876-1953)
- Oton Vinski (1877–1942)
- Zdenko Vinski (1913–1989)
- Ezel Alexander (1994–)

== See also ==
- Aleksander (Hasidic dynasty)

== Bibliography ==
- Dobrovšak, Ljiljana Žebec; Šilj, Ivana (31 December 2020). "The Alexander Family Chronicle". Colloquia Humanistica (9): 255–272. doi:10.11649/ch.2020.015. S2CID 234465520.
- Mirnik, Ivan (2002). "The Alexanders or the History of a Zagreb Family in Past Perfect.". Jasminka DOMAŠ ed. Family. Mešpaha. Eisenstadt. pp. 37–53.
- Mirnik, Ivan (2012). "Referat Dr. Viktora Alexandra Caru Karlu". In Željko Holjevac (ed.). 1918. u hrvatskoj povijesti (in Croatian). Zagreb: Matica hrvatska.
