= Samuel David Alexander =

Croatian Jewish industrialist

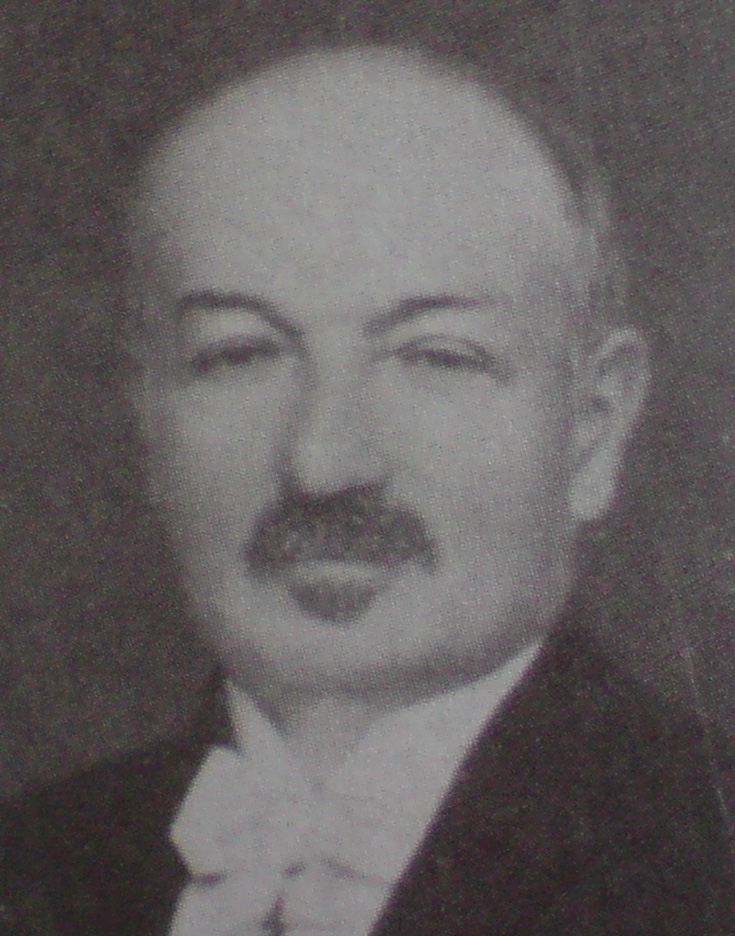
- Born: 13 July 1862; Zagreb, Austrian Empire (now Croatia)
- Died: 8 March 1943 (aged 80); Zagreb, Independent State of Croatia
- Spouse: Emma (née Neumann) Alexander
- Children: Vera (b. ?); Gizela (b. 189?); Mira (b. 1902); Ivo (b. 1898); Božidar (b. 1900); Branko (b. 1902); Dragutin (b. 1904)
- Relatives: Šandor Alexander (brother); Oskar Alexander (cousin); Viktor Alexander (cousin)
- Family: Alexander

Samuel "Sami" David Alexander (13 July 1862 – 8 March 1943) was a Croatian Jewish industrialist, doyen of Croatian industrialists, a philanthropist and a member of the Zagreb prominent Alexander family.

== Background and family ==
Alexander, known as Der Gescheite (The Smart One), was born in Zagreb to a Jewish family. His father, Jonas Alexander, was a merchant who came to Zagreb from Güssing, Austria and his mother Roza (née Stern) was from an old influential Jewish family from Zagreb. Alexander's father was councillor at the "Croatian commercial artisan chamber". Alexander had a younger brother, Šandor, and two sisters, Gizela and Ilka. He attended elementary and high school in Zagreb, and a business academy in Vienna. Around 1860 his father opened a grain store in Zagreb. After his education, Alexander returned to Zagreb and started to work with his father. In 1880 he moved to Sisak where he opened another grain store for his family business. There he was introduced to his future wife, Emma (née Neumann), the daughter of Varaždin businessman Wolf Neumann. With his wife Alexander had three daughters, Vera (died as a child), Gizela and Mira, and four sons, Ivo, Božidar, Branko and Dragutin. All his children were born in Sisak. Alexander was an active member of the Israelites of Zagreb community. Since 1885 he was the president of the choral society "Danica". In 1915 he moved back to Zagreb with his family. Alexander was member of the society "Narodni rad - društvo židovskih asimilanata i anticionista u Hrvatskoj" (Peoples work - Society of Jewish assimilates and anti Zionists in Croatia).

== Business career ==
Cement factory "Croatia" in Zagreb

He was known as an organizational genius. In 1893, Alexander bought a brewery in Sisak, "Sisačka pivovara". In Sisak he was elected as the representative in the city assembly and was vice president of the savings cooperatives for Sisak and surrounding areas. Alexander owned the ceramic factory "Titanit", chemical factory "Danica", cement factory "Croatia", colliery "Mirna", cooking oil factory "Zagreb" (now "Zvijezda") and was major shareholder of Zagrebačka pivovara. Alexander co-founded the "Zagreb Stock Exchange for the goods and values" (now "Zagreb Stock Exchange") and was co-founder of "Zagreb assembly" (now "Zagreb Fair"). He was also the elected president of "Industrialists Union" in 1919, and board member of the "Commercial Chamber". Alexander also owned several residential buildings in Zagreb. In the "Industrialists Union" he promoted and protected Croatian industry against Hungary and its economic policy in the Austro-Hungarian Empire. Under his leadership all of Croatia and Slavonia industry was assembled under the "Industrialists Union". Alexander donated a great deal of his profits to charity.

== Later life ==
Alexander was a great philanthropist who often aided the city of Zagreb, the poor and those in need. In 1941, during World War II, with the NDH regime in power, Alexander and his wife found refuge at the sanatorium in Klaićeva street. In 1942, Alexander and his wife moved to the sanatorium of Dr. Đuro Vranešić, known for saving 80 Jews, in Zelengaj street 57. He died there relatively peacefully at the age of 80 in 1943. Alexander was buried at the Mirogoj Cemetery. In an attempt to save themselves from the Ustaše and Nazi persecution, his family was scattered all over the world. Some of them temporarily stayed in Perugia, Italy. His wife and children survived the Holocaust. Many members of Alexander family perished during the Holocaust. His sister Ilka was killed at the Jasenovac concentration camp in 1942 together with her son-in-law Oton Vinski, his niece Zora was killed in 1944 at Auschwitz.

== Bibliography ==
- Snješka Knežević, Aleksander Laslo (2011). Židovski Zagreb. Zagreb: AGM, Židovska općina Zagreb. ISBN 978-953-174-393-8.
- Goldstein, Ivo (2005). Židovi u Zagrebu 1918 - 1941. Zagreb: Novi Liber. ISBN 953-6045-23-0.
- Kraus, Ognjen (1998). Dva stoljeća povijesti i kulture Židova u Zagrebu i Hrvatskoj. Zagreb: Židovska općina Zagreb. ISBN 953-96836-2-9.
- Domaš Nalbantić, Jasminka (1996). Obitelj. Zagreb: Kulturno društvo «Miroslav Šalom Freiberger» - Novi Liber. ISBN 953-6045-11-7.
- Banac, Ivo (1988). The National Question in Yugoslavia: Origins, History, Politics. Ithaca, New York: Cornell University Press. ISBN 978-080-149-493-2.
- Schwarz, Gavro (1939). Povijest Zagrebačke židovske općine od osnutka do 50-tih godina 19. vijeka. Zagreb: Gaj.
- Goldstein, Ivo (2001). Holokaust u Zagrebu. Zagreb: Novi Liber. ISBN 953-6045-19-2.
- Imenik Dostojanstvenika, činovnika I Javnih Službenika Kraljevine Hrvatske I Slavonije. Zagreb. 1911.
- Imenik Dostojanstvenika, činovnika I Javnih Službenika Kraljevine Hrvatske I Slavonije. Zagreb. 1894.
- Imenik Dostojanstvenika, činovnika I Javnih Službenika Kraljevine Hrvatske I Slavonije. Zagreb. 1908.
- Svijet. Zagreb. 1929.
