= Ivo Frank =

Croatian lawyer and politician (1877–1939)

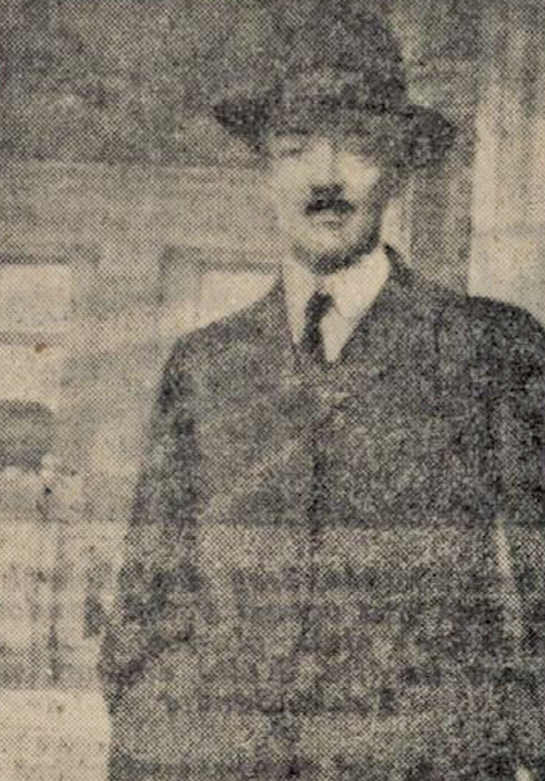
- Ivo Frank in 1934
- Born: 17 December 1877; Zagreb, Kingdom of Croatia-Slavonia, Austria-Hungary (now Croatia)
- Died: 19 December 1939 (aged 62); Budapest, Hungary
- Resting place: Mirogoj Cemetery, Zagreb
- Education: University of Zagreb
- Occupations: Politician, lawyer
- Political party: Party of Rights; Pure Party of Rights
- Relatives: Josip Frank (father); Dido Kvaternik (nephew)

Ivo Frank (17 December 1877 – 19 December 1939) was a Croatian politician and lawyer, and member of the Party of Rights. Frank gained prominence as a member of the group that tore down a Hungarian flag to protest the 1895 visit by Emperor Franz Joseph to Zagreb. He was elected a member of the Kingdom of Croatia-Slavonia's parliament (called the Sabor) in the final decade of the Austro-Hungarian Empire. Before the dissolution of Austria-Hungary, Frank advocated for trialist reform of the empire as a means of protection against the Magyarisation and Serbian irredentism. Following the establishment of the Kingdom of Serbs, Croats and Slovenes in 1918, Frank left the country to lead the émigré Croatian Committee, which advocated for Croatian independence.

Frank sought a political alliance with Gabriele D'Annunzio, who had seized the city of Rijeka (Fiume) in the immediate aftermath of World War I for the Italians. He reached agreements with D'Annunzio on Italian support in return for territorial concessions in Dalmatia, but the Kingdom of Italy withdrew its support following the Treaty of Rapallo and ended negotiations with the Kingdom of Serbs, Croats and Slovenes in 1920. Subsequently, Frank focused on gaining Hungarian support by advocating for a revised version of the Treaty of Trianon, which partitioned the Kingdom of Hungary after the war. He further proposed a political partnership between Hungary and Croatia against Pan-Slavism, Eastern Orthodoxy, and Pan-Germanism. In 1927, Frank again sought Italian support for Croatian independence, promising Italian dominance in the Adriatic Sea and territorial concessions. He, together with Ante Pavelić, appealed to Benito Mussolini. Frank's leading standing among the Croatian political émigrés began to wane in 1929 with the rise of Pavelić-led fascist Ustaše. Frank endorsed Ustaše in the early 1930s, but he appeared to distance himself from them in 1934.

== Early life ==
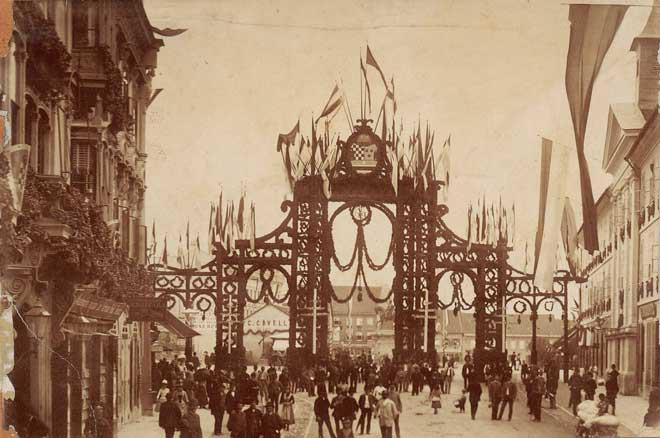
The triumphal arch, erected for the occasion of the 1895 visit by Emperor Franz Joseph to Zagreb

Ivo Frank, sometimes also referred to as Ivan or Ivica, was born in Zagreb in 1877 to politician Josip Frank and his wife Olga (née Rojčević). He took part in taking down a flag of Hungary from a triumphal arch at the Zagreb Glavni kolodvor railway station, as part of a way to protest the 1895 visit by Emperor Franz Joseph to Zagreb. Frank was arrested and convicted for the action and sentenced to four months in prison. In 1905, Frank obtained a doctoral degree in law from the Faculty of Law, University of Zagreb. According to Frank's wife Aglaja, he spoke German, English, and French fluently, and had a basic command of Italian. In the 1930s, Frank also learned Hungarian.

== Career as an elected politician ==
=== Election to the Sabor ===
Frank ran unsuccessfully for a seat in the Sabor, the legislative body of the Kingdom of Croatia-Slavonia (a part of the Austria-Hungary at the time) in the 1906 and 1908 elections on the Party of Rights ticket before switching electoral districts to Vojni Križ, where his father was the incumbent, for the 1911 Croatian parliamentary election. Frank's father led a faction of the Party of Rights known as the Frankists, named for Josip Frank himself, which advocated for protecting Croatian autonomy against Magyarisation and Serbian irredentism through a trialist reform of Austria-Hungary.

Frank was elected to the Sabor in 1911, and he kept the seat until the dissolution of Austria-Hungary in 1918. Following the assassination of Archduke Franz Ferdinand in Sarajevo in 1914, Frank verbally attacked members of the ruling Croat-Serb Coalition, accusing them of treason because he deemed their response to the assassination inadequate. In his speech at the Ban Jelačić Square in Zagreb on 30 June 1914, shortly after the anti-Serb riots in Sarajevo, Frank condemned the Serbs for the assassination and for undermining Austria-Hungary, sparking anti-Serb demonstrations in Zagreb. Some sources erroneously describe Frank as the president of the Party of Rights, although he was only a member.

=== World War I ===
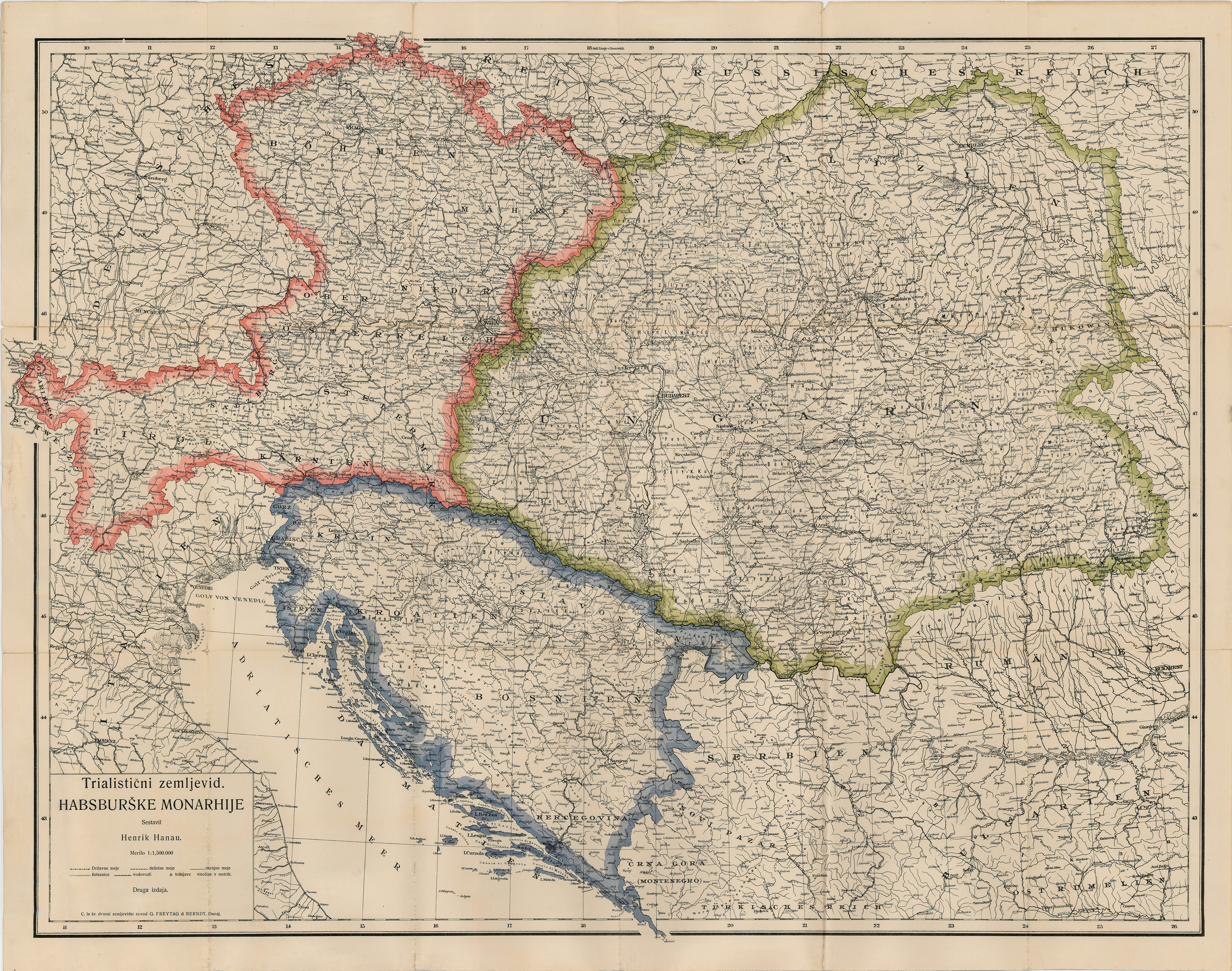
A trialist proposal for reform of Austria-Hungary from 1905

Following the outbreak of World War I, Frank was drafted in as an artillery lieutenant and deployed in June 1915 to Bukovina until restoration of the Sabor, when Frank returned to Zagreb. In this period, Frank advocated for political reform of Austria-Hungary to save the empire. Frank was a part of the delegation also comprising Frankist leaders Aleksandar Horvat and Josip Pazman to Emperor Charles I of Austria and prime minister István Tisza in the final year of the war. They unsuccessfully tried to persuade the emperor to reform Austria-Hungary according to trialist ideas, which would give Croats greater political autonomy within the empire. The move made Frank unpopular in Croatian media at the time. As Austria-Hungary disintegrated, and its South-Slavic population largely became ruled by the newly established Kingdom of Serbs, Croats and Slovenes (later renamed Yugoslavia), Frank came into conflict with the new authorities as an opponent of Yugoslavist ideas. Frank was arrested in relation to the protest of Croatian Home Guard soldiers in Zagreb in December 1918. However, Frank was not associated with the protest and he was soon released.

== Political emigration ==
=== Croatian Committee ===
Frank moved to Graz, Republic of German-Austria in 1919 where he became a prominent figure among Croatian political émigrés, largely consisting of former Austro-Hungarian Army officers. He chaired the Croatian Committee, established in 1919, which operated in Budapest, Vienna, and Graz to promote Croatian independence. Historian Jozo Tomasevich described Frank as the only person of significant standing in Croatian political emigration in the aftermath of World War I. After Frank left the country, the government revoked his licence to practice law in May 1920 and the University of Zagreb cancelled Frank's doctoral degree two months later.

=== Venice Agreements ===
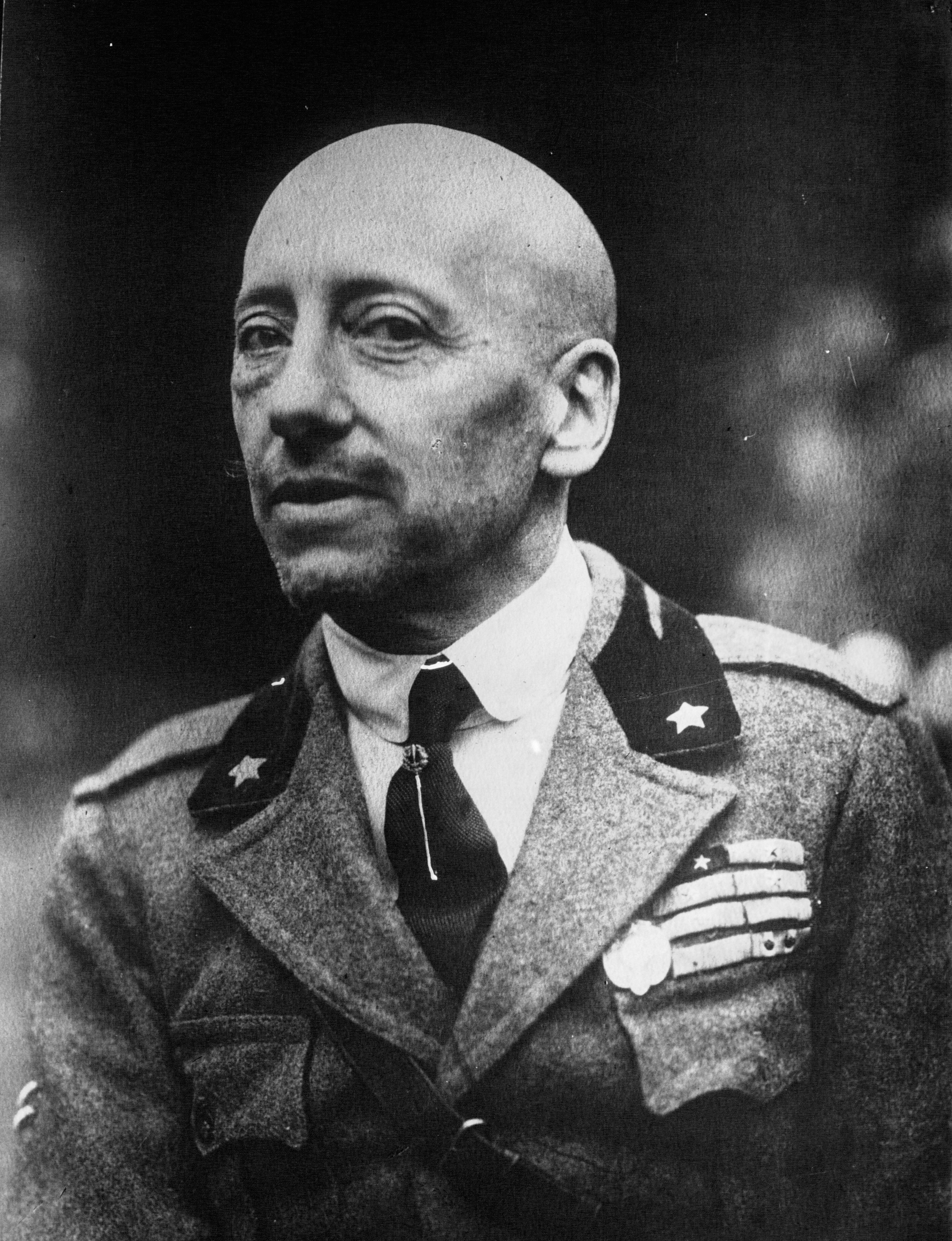
Gabrielle D'Annunzio (pictured) and Frank concluded political alliance in 1920.

Frank sought support from Gabriele D'Annunzio who had seized the city of Rijeka (Fiume) in the immediate aftermath of World War I and established the Italian Regency of Carnaro. He also contacted Italian fascists regarding potential alliances. Cooperation with D'Annunzio was first formalised on 5 July 1920, when Frank and his associate Emanuel Gagliardi met with D'Annunzio's representatives, Giovanni Host-Venturi and Giovanni Giuriati, in Venice and signed two agreements. The first agreement promised D'Annunzio's support of Croatian, as well as Albanian and Montenegrin, émigrés in the form of supplying money and arms for the struggle against the Kingdom of Serbs, Croats and Slovenes. The second agreement dealt with the borders of the future Croatian republic, which was envisioned as generally corresponding to the former Kingdom of Croatia-Slavonia. The agreement defined Italian territorial gains around Rijeka and some Adriatic islands. Main Dalmatian cities were to become politically autonomous free ports. Namely, Zadar, Šibenik, Trogir, Split, and Dubrovnik were to form an independent, loose federation or a "maritime alliance". The rest of Dalmatia would be organised as a separate republic. The Dalmatian republic was to decide on joining the Croatian republic in a plebiscite. Some sources claim that D'Annunzio was acting on behalf of Italy. When D'Annunzio organised a meeting in Rijeka in 1920 aimed at establishing an alternative League of Nations for politically oppressed peoples, Frank attended and signed an alliance agreement with D'Annunzio.

=== Opposition to the Treaty of Trianon ===
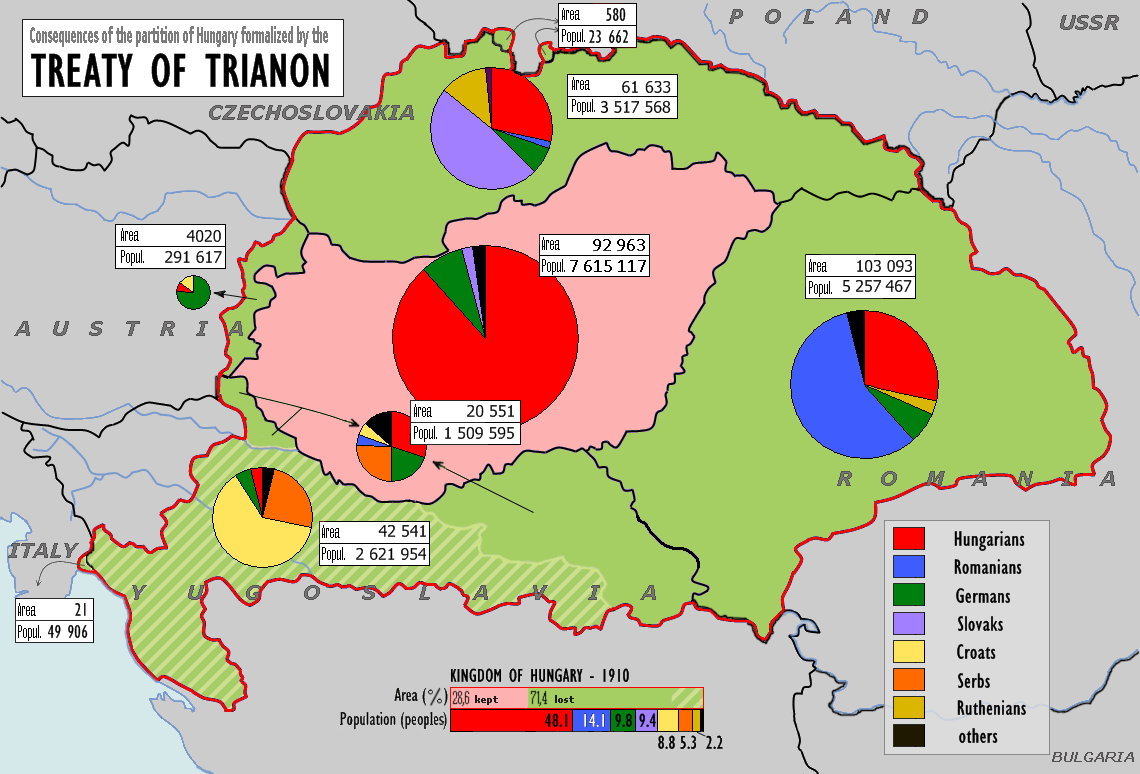
The territories Hungary lost in the Treaty of Trianon (green); the charts represent ethnic composition (red is for Hungarians)

The Treaty of Rapallo ended Frank's efforts to forge a political alliance with the Kingdom of Italy against the Kingdom of Serbs, Croats and Slovenes. After this, the Croatian Committee became divided, with Frank leading its Budapest-based faction, and permanently moving to Budapest. Frank and his faction then started advocating for a revision of the Treaty of Trianon, which partitioned Hungary after the war. He promoted the return of the southern Baranya, Bačka, and Banat regions to Hungary, which would in return accept the transfer of Međimurje to Croatia (which had not been under Hungarian control since the 1918 occupation of the region). In this respect, Frank cooperated with the Hungarian Revisionist League Party of György Lukács. Frank advocated for the linking of the Croatian struggle for independence with Hungarian demands for revision of the Treaty of Trianon. He further proposed a political partnership between Hungary, Croatia, and other states to resist Pan-Slavism, Eastern Orthodoxy, and Pan-Germanism. Frank presented these ideas in a 1933 lecture and accompanying brochure called "A revízió és a Horvátság".

=== Relationship with Ustaše ===
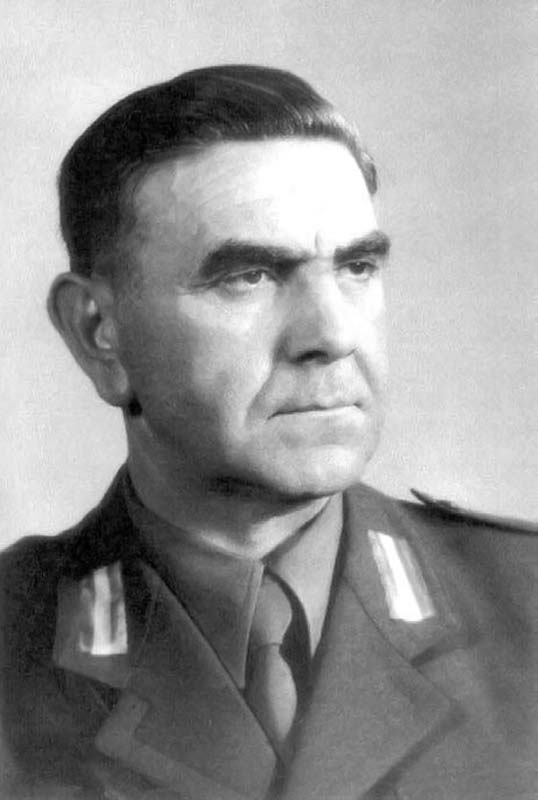
Ante Pavelić (pictured) and Frank offered Benito Mussolini alliance in 1927.

After Benito Mussolini came to power in Italy, Frank sent him a letter seeking Italian support for Croatian independence while promising Croatia would be within an Italian sphere of influence and accept Italian "political and military domination" on the Adriatic Sea. The letter, authored jointly with Ante Pavelić in 1927, also promised to cede to Italy the Bay of Kotor and parts of Dalmatia that were of strategic importance to Italy. Frank and Pavelić met in Budapest in 1927. They both sent copies of the memorandum to Mussolini. Frank handed his copy to the Italian ambassador to Hungary, while Pavelić passed his to Roberto Forges Davanzati when he visited Rome that year. The influence Frank had among the Croatian political émigrés was eclipsed by the rise of the Pavelić-led fascist Ustaše in 1929. Subsequently, in the early 1930s, Frank endorsed Ustaše. In 1934, he appeared to distance himself from them, cautioning his nephew and later Ustaše General-Lieutenant Dido Kvaternik to abandon fascism. Historian Bogdan Krizman claims that the change came about because Pavelić involved Kvaternik in planning the assassination of King Alexander I of Yugoslavia in Marseille that year, which Frank resented.

=== Final years ===
Frank left politics and worked as a gardener and a florist in Budapest, where he died in 1939. In 2007, his remains were moved from Budapest to Zagreb's Mirogoj Cemetery.

== Sources ==
- "Frank, Ivo (Ivan, Ivica)". Židovski biografski leksikon (in Croatian). Miroslav Krleža Institute of Lexicography.
- Banac, Ivo (1984). The National Question in Yugoslavia: Origins, History, Politics. Ithaca, New York: Cornell University Press. ISBN 0-8014-1675-2.
- Matković, Stjepan (2008). "Prilozi za politički životopis Ive Franka i evoluciju pravaštva" [Contributions for a Political Biography of Ivo Frank and Evolution of the Party of Right's Ideology]. Časopis za suvremenu povijest (in Croatian). 40 (3). Zagreb: Hrvatski institut za povijest: 1067–1086. ISSN 0590-9597.
- Tomas, Domagoj; Njari, Denis (2022). "Ivo Frank i revizija Trianonskoga ugovora" [Ivo Frank and the Revision of the Treaty of Trianon]. Časopis za suvremenu povijest (in Croatian). 54 (2). Zagreb: Hrvatski institut za povijest: 421–444. doi:10.22586/csp.v54i2.21227. ISSN 0590-9597.
- Tomasevich, Jozo (2002). War and Revolution in Yugoslavia, 1941–1945: Occupation and Collaboration. Stanford, California: Stanford University Press. ISBN 978-0-8047-0857-9.
- Veselinović, Velimir (2018). "Pregled razvoja pravaške ideologije i politike" [An Overview of the Development of Rightist Ideology and Politics]. Časopis za suvremenu povijest (in Croatian). 50 (3). Zagreb: Croatian Institute of History: 583–620. ISSN 0590-9597.
