= Šandor Alexander =

Croatian nobleman, industrialist and philanthropist

Šandor Alexander pl. Sesvetski
- Born: 5 April 1866; Zagreb, Austrian Empire, (now Croatia)
- Died: 17 December 1929 (aged 63); Belgrade, Kingdom of Yugoslavia, (now Serbia)
- Resting place: Mirogoj Cemetery
- Citizenship: Croatia
- Spouse: Karolina Dragojla (née Ebenspanger) Alexander
- Children: Zora (b. 1895)
- Relatives: Samuel David Alexander (brother); Oskar Alexander (cousin); Viktor Alexander (cousin)

Šandor Alexander pl. Sesvetski (April 5, 1866 – December 17, 1929) was a Croatian nobleman, industrialist, philanthropist, younger brother of Samuel David Alexander and member of the Zagreb prominent Alexander family.

== Background and family ==
Alexander, known as Der Berühmte (The Notable One), was born in Zagreb to a Croatian Jewish family. His father, Jonas Alexander, was a merchant who came to Zagreb from Güssing, Austria, and his mother Roza (née Stern) was from Zagreb old influential Jewish family. Alexander had an older brother, Samuel David, and two sisters, Gizela and Ilka. Alexander attended elementary and high school in Zagreb. He was married to Karolina Dragojla (née Ebenspanger) Alexander, who was from Varaždin. Together they had only child, daughter Zora who was born on September 18, 1895, in Zagreb. Alexander wife died in Zagreb, on September 18, 1925. His daughter was married to Croatian Jewish industrialist and merchant, Artur Marić (born Mayer). In 1944, during World War II, Alexander daughter was killed by Nazis in Auschwitz.

== Business and political career ==
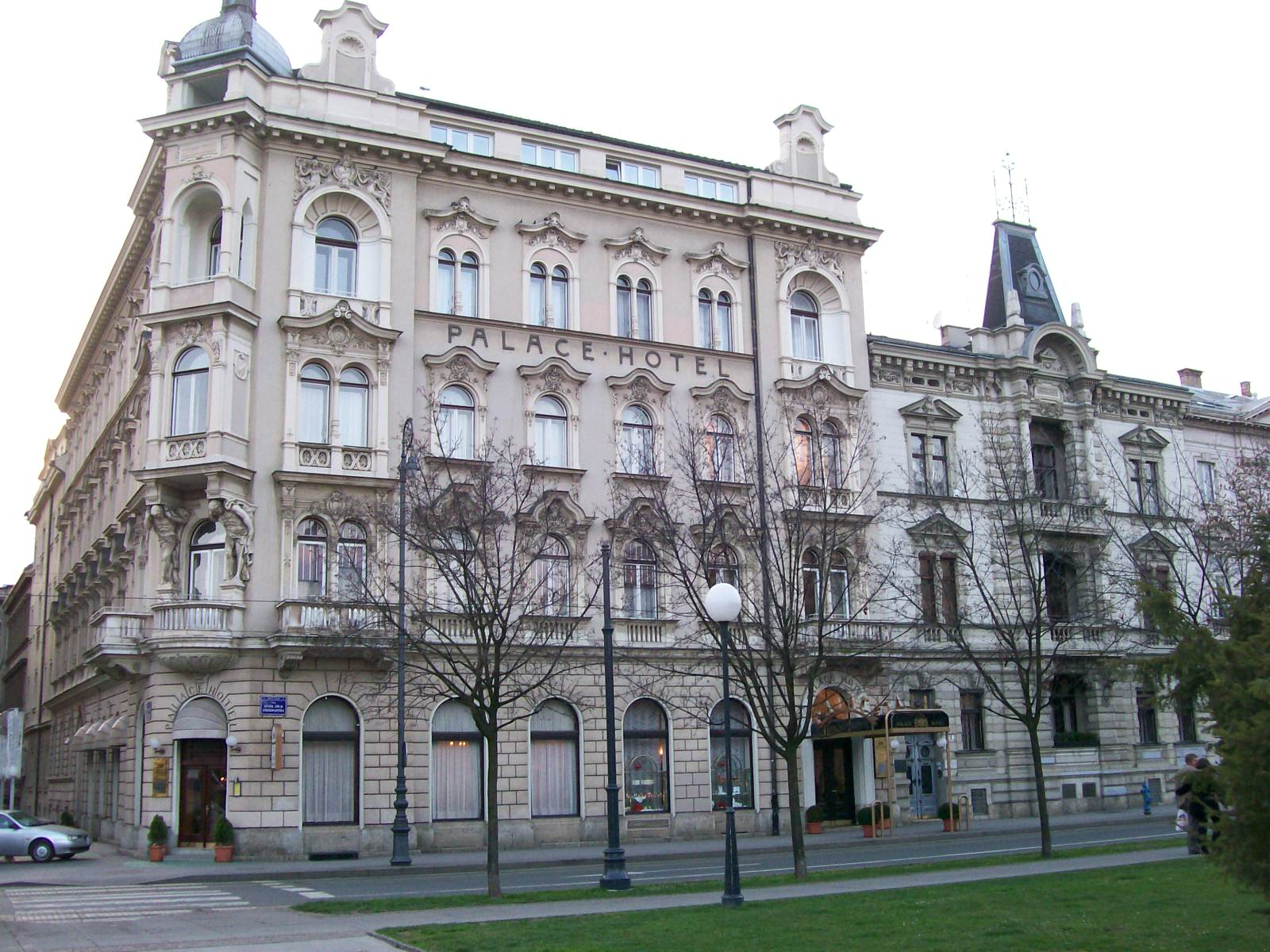
Hotel Palace in Zagreb, originally called Schlesinger Palace (1891), once owned by Alexander

After his education, Alexander worked for 3 years at the "Paromlin" in Zagreb. Alexander gained his commercial training as a partner of his father, at their family grain wholesale. He was a remarkable economic expert who published the noted article in the "Bankarstvo" magazine, 1924. Between 1905 and 1910, Alexander was the city representative in the Zagreb City Assembly. In 1909 he became the adviser of Franz Joseph I of Austria. Alexander worked and was a member in more than 60 association in Croatia. He was the councillor, vice president and honorary president of the "Commercial Chamber". He also worked as treasurer and later as a vice president of the "Commercial Home" in Zagreb, and as an honorary vice president of the "Association of traders for Croatia and Slavonija". Alexander was also the vice president of the "Bank for commerce and industry d.d.", and board member of the "Croatian trust bank d.d." and "Croatian commercial bank d.d.". Since 1885, at "Croatian commercial association Merkur", Alexander was at first vice president, since 1892 the president and in 1910, he was honored as a lifetime president. Within "Merkur", he advocated the development of vocational education. Alexander was major stockholder of the "First Croatian machinery factory and iron foundry" in Zagreb. He also encouraged the development of tourism in Croatia, and as so he was the major shareholder of "Schlesinger Palace" (now "Hotel Palace, Zagreb") in Zagreb. Alexander was member of the society "Narodni rad - društvo židovskih asimilanata i anticionista u Hrvatskoj" (Peoples work - Society of Jewish assimilates and anti Zionists in Croatia).

== Philanthropy ==
Alexander was a great philanthropist, just like his brother, who donated the most of his wealth to charity. Around 1908, Alexander founded the society for feeding poor school children in Zagreb, where he was also the treasurer. He also managed the Croatian academic society, which supported and funded the poor academic citizens. Every society which had the fortune to have Alexander as a treasurer, never had problems with finances. During World War I, Alexander organized and largely financed the "Council for helping the unemployed and disabled employees of trading, industrial and financial institutions", which he also chaired as the president. His greatest merit was when he, fall of 1914, established a public kitchen for the poor citizens and families of those who fought on the battlefield during the war. Alexander founded the charity "Prehrana". At 1925, "Prehrana" was estimated at 25 million dinars. "Prehrana" distributed millions of meals, according to some estimates over 15 million. At the beginning of the World War I, Alexander donated 1 million florins as an irreversible war loan to the state. For that, on August 13, 1918, Alexander was knighted by Charles I of Austria and awarded with the title pl. (plemeniti (in Croatian) = noble ) Sesvetski.

== Death ==
On December 17, 1929, while attending the Royal Guard ball in Belgrade, Alexander suddenly fell ill. He died from a heart attack in the night from the 17th to the 18th of December 1929. All major newspapers reported in detail and with great sadness about Alexanders death and funeral. Alexander was buried at the Mirogoj Cemetery with a huge crowd attending the funeral.

== See also ==
- Samuel David Alexander
- Oskar Alexander
- Viktor Alexander

== Bibliography ==
- Snješka Knežević, Aleksander Laslo (2011). Židovski Zagreb. Zagreb: AGM, Židovska općina Zagreb. ISBN 978-953-174-393-8.
- Goldstein, Ivo (2005). Židovi u Zagrebu 1918 - 1941. Zagreb: Novi Liber. ISBN 953-6045-23-0.
- Kraus, Ognjen (1998). Dva stoljeća povijesti i kulture Židova u Zagrebu i Hrvatskoj. Zagreb: Židovska općina Zagreb. ISBN 953-96836-2-9.
- Schwarz, Gavro (1939). Povijest Zagrebačke židovske općine od osnutka do 50-tih godina 19. vijeka. Zagreb: Gaj.
- Banac, Ivo (1988). The National Question in Yugoslavia: Origins, History, Politics. Ithaca, New York: Cornell University Press. ISBN 978-080-149-493-2.
