= Emanuel Gagliardi =

- Born: 29 April 1885; Zagreb, Croatia-Slavonia, Austria-Hungary (now Croatia)
- Died: 25 March 1942 (aged 56); Stara Gradiška, Independent State of Croatia (now Croatia)
- Education: University of Zagreb
- Occupation: Politician
- Political party: Croatian Party of Rights; People's Radical Party (1925)

Emanuel Gagliardi (29 April 1885 – 25 March 1942) was a Croatian and Yugoslavian politician.

Emanuel Gagliardi, sometimes also referred to as Manco or Manko Gagliardi graduated law and received a doctoral degree from the Faculty of Law, University of Zagreb in 1911. Before the outbreak of the World War I, Gagliardi was a member of the Croatian Party of Rights (Frankists) in the Kingdom of Croatia-Slavonia, then a part of Austria-Hungary. In December 1918, following the dissolution of Austria-Hungary and establishment of the Kingdom of Serbs, Croats and Slovenes (renamed Yugoslavia in 1929), Gagliardi moved to Graz, Republic of German-Austria. There he helped establish and participated in work of the émigré organisation of the Croatian Committee. The organisation, led by Ivo Frank advocated Croatian independence from the Kingdom of Serbs, Croats and Slovenes. Gagliardi returned to the Kingdom of Serbs, Croats and Slovenes in 1923, and was briefly arrested in Zagreb. In 1925, Gagliardi joined the pro-regime People's Radical Party and unsuccessfully tried to establish the Croatian People's Radical Party. He moved abroad again in the 1930s. After the Axis Invasion of Yugoslavia and establishment of the puppet state of the Independent State of Croatia (NDH), Gagliardi returned to Zagreb and tried to establish close ties with the Ustaše who ruled in the NDH. He was arrested along with other suspected free masons and imprisoned in the Stara Gradiška concentration camp. Gagliardi was summarily executed there in 1942.
