= Giovanni Host-Venturi =

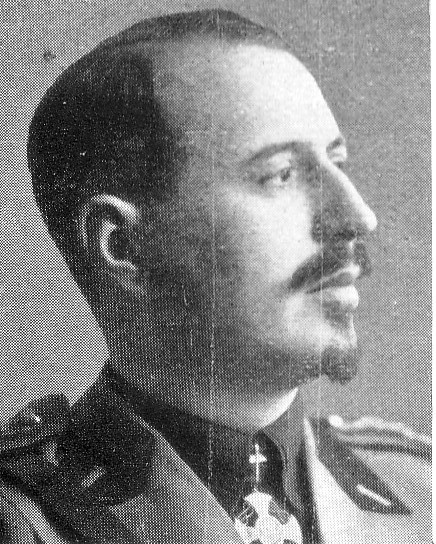

Minister of Communications
- In office 31 October 1939 – 6 February 1943
- Prime Minister: Benito Mussolini
- Preceded by: Antonio Stefano Benni
- Succeeded by: Vittorio Cini

Member of the Chamber of Deputies
- In office 28 April 1934 – 2 March 1939

Member of the Chamber of Fasces and Corporations
- In office 23 March 1939 – 5 August 1943

Personal details
- Born: Giovanni Host-Ivessich; 24 June 1892 Fiume
- Died: 29 April 1980 (aged 87) Buenos Aires, Argentina
- Party: National Fascist Party
- Military career
- Allegiance: Kingdom of Italy
- Branch: Italian Royal Army
- Service years: 1915–1918; 1942–1943
- Rank: Captain
- Unit: Alpini
- Conflicts: World War I Bloody Christmas (1920); Second Italo-Ethiopian War; World War II

Giovanni Host-Venturi, also known as "Nino" Host-Venturi (born Giovanni Host-Ivessich; 24 June 1892 – 29 April 1980) was an Italian fascist politician and historian.

== Italian irredentist ==
Born as Giovanni Host-Ivessich in Fiume, then Austria-Hungary, Nino Host obtained a license to middle school, and specialized as a dentistry technician. In the eve of World War I, he enrolled the Sursum Corda. An Italian irredentist, he defected to the Italians and participated as a volunteer, with the new nom de guerre "Venturi" earning thrice a Silver Medal of Military Valor and the rank of captain of the Alpini and then the Arditi.

In November 1918 he arrived in Fiume with the Italian occupation troops, and immediately was co-opted in the Italian National Council of Fiume. In Fiume in April 1919, Giovanni Venturi created the "Legion of Fiume", consisting of a core of volunteers officially to defend the city from the French army contingent in the city, who took a pro-Yugoslav stance. In May 1919, Host-Venturi went to Milan to meet Benito Mussolini, from which he obtained promises of support, and immediately after, under the auspices of Giovanni Giuriati he arranged several meetings in Rome with Gabriele D'Annunzio and was instrumental in organising his Impresa di Fiume.

Between June and July 1920, Host-Venturi also opened a series of secret meetings with Croat (specifically the Croatian Committee), Montenegrin and Albanian separatists to explore the possibility of a concerted campaign that aimed to "prevent the consolidation of the so-called Yugoslavia".

== Fascist leader ==
As a Fascist exponent, Host-Venturi was among the advocates of forced assimilation of non-native populations present in Venezia Giulia. In a speech held on 23 May 1925 at the Congress of Istrian Fascists, he denounced the use of the Slavic language by local Slovenes and Croats during their church attendance. In 1927, at a conference that took place in Trieste, Host-Venturi with Bruno Coceani, Joseph Cobolli and other leaders from Venezia Giulia, outlined the guidelines for a complete Italianization to the "alloglot" minority in Friuli, Venezia Giulia and Zara.

Host-Venturi become secretary of the Fascist Federation of Fiume from 15 November 1925 to 24 May 1928, and was a special commissioner to Pola from 1 April to 24 May 1926. He was the head of the Fascist Party (PNF), and 1934–1935 member of the Corporation of insurance and credit. From January 1935 to October 1939, Host-Venturi was secretary to the Merchant Marine. As Secretary of the Merchant Marine, Host-Venturi was among those who contributed most to the consolidation of the Finmare, the Italian state shipping financial holding company which covered the maritime sector within Istituto per la Ricostruzione Industriale (IRI).

== Minister of Communications ==
On 31 October 1939 Mussolini asked him to substitute Benni the guidance of the Ministry of Communications. It was a ministerial reshuffle which served to alienate Mussolini "technocrats" who until then had in hand the most important economic ministries. The decision was made in the climate of controversy so-called "anti-bourgeois" and was not foreign to the approach of Mussolini's decision to war. A leading such sensitive areas he wanted to call people to PNF trusted men of the "fascist revolution", and Host-Venturi was certainly one of these. As war approached Italian territory Giovanni Host Venturi created a special anti guerrilla unit the "Nucleo paracadutisti dalmati" to support the dalmatian Chetniks against Tito's partisans.

Host-Venturi remained at the Ministry of Communications until 6 February 1943, when he was replaced by Senator Vittorio Cini, this time following a massive government reshuffle which saw the removal of fascist authority following the heavy military defeats and the approaching invasion of national territory by the Allies. Five months before the fall of fascism, for reasons that are not known to us, Host-Venturi was ousted from the government by Mussolini as a result of a deep reshuffling of the government operated by the "Duce."

He joined the Italian Social Republic, although not holding office or senior positions.

== After the war ==
At the end of the war chose to leave Italy. He moved to Argentina in 1948.

Franco Venturi, his son, was born in Rome in 1937, and emigrated at an early age in Argentina together with his father and family, where he became a painter and cartoonist. Franco Venturi was seized in Mar del Plata on 24 February 1976 and was considered as a desaparecido in the 1980s.

Nino Host-Venturi died in 1980 by committing suicide in Buenos Aires.

== Works ==
- La passione di Fiume, Fiume 1928;
- Raffaele Rubattino, in Celebrazioni liguri, parte I, Urbino 1939, pp. 243–274;
- L'impresa fiumana, Roma 1976.
