= Oskar Alexander =

Croatian academic, painter and professor

- Born: 20 February 1876; Zagreb, Austro-Hungarian Empire, (now Croatia)
- Died: 16 April 1953 (aged 77); Samobor, SFR Yugoslavia, (now Croatia)
- Education: Academy of Fine Arts Vienna
- Occupation: Painter
- Spouse: Gerda (née Schneefuss) Alexander
- Children: Liselotte (b. 1922)
- Relatives: Viktor Alexander (stepbrother); Samuel David Alexander (cousin); Šandor Alexander (cousin)

Oskar Artur Alexander (February 20, 1876 – April 16, 1953) was a Croatian academic painter and professor.

== Background and family ==
Alexander was born in Zagreb to a prominent Jewish family Alexander. His father, Ljudevit Alexander, was from Güssing, Austria and his mother was Ida (née Weiss) Alexander, daughter of Maksimilijan Weiss from Karlovac, who served under Ban of Croatia Josip Jelačić. Alexander had stepbrothers Viktor and Erich, brothers, Artur and Robert Milan, and two sisters, Gizela and Olga. He was the cousin of two known Croatian industrialists, Samuel David and Šandor Alexander.

Alexander was married to Sudeten German Gerda (née Schneefuss) Alexander, from Vienna. Together they had a daughter Liselotte, born on January 25, 1922. Alexander resided between Zagreb, Samobor and Vienna. In Vienna his first neighbour was Hugo von Hofmannsthal.

== Education and career ==
Oskar Alexander self-portrait around 1896

From 1894 to 1899, Alexander studied at the Academy of Fine Arts in Vienna under Franz Rumpler and Franz von Matsch. He also studied at the Académie Julian in Paris, under Eugène Carrière and James Abbott McNeill Whistler. Although generally with no money, Alexander lived an interesting life in Paris. Initially he slept in the corner of the drawing hall. While in Paris, Alexander meet Émile Zola, whom he portrayed in some Parisian cafe. Alexander also portrayed Oscar Wilde.

In Paris, he also socialized with Antun Gustav Matoš, who shared a room with Alexander. With Vlaho Bukovac, Viktor Kovačić and others, he co-founded the "Association of Croatian Artists". In 1900 he presented his work in Paris and Munich. From 1908, Alexander was an active member of Hagenbund. In 1912, the Kingdom of Croatia-Slavonia provincial government named him Professor of Fine Arts. Alexander was friends with Croatian politician and royal commissioner Slavko Cuvaj.

During World War I, Alexander was a war painter, outlining compositions on the battlefield which he later transferred to canvas. Because of that he received the medal from Franz Joseph I of Austria. Among many, Alexander portrayed Engelbert Dollfuss, Vladko Maček and Josip Broz Tito while he visited his sister in Samobor, 1948. On May 12, 1937, in Vienna Glaspalast, Alexander presented 138 paintings, while Alexander Löhr opened the exhibition.

== Death ==
Alexander died on April 16, 1953, in Samobor heartbroken by the Holocaust, which he barely survived, and events during the World War II. He was deeply disappointed in the people who he had helped, among them Ljubo Babić. Alexander wrote; "Yet in the world it has never happened, to one who has shown so much patriotism, that he is not acknowledged in his homeland, as it happened to me...".

== See also ==
- Samuel David Alexander
- Šandor Alexander
- Viktor Alexander

== Bibliography ==
- Snješka Knežević, Aleksander Laslo (2011). Židovski Zagreb. Zagreb: AGM, Židovska općina Zagreb. ISBN 978-953-174-393-8.
- Goldstein, Ivo (2005). Židovi u Zagrebu 1918 - 1941. Zagreb: Novi Liber. ISBN 953-6045-23-0.
