= Mile Starčević (politician, born 1904) =

Politician in WWII Nazi-puppet Independent State Croatia

- Born: 15 September 1904; Gospić, Croatia-Slavonia, Austria-Hungary
- Died: 9 March 1953 (aged 48); Buenos Aires, Argentina
- Education: University of Zagreb
- Occupation: Politician
- Political party: Croatian Federalist Peasant Party (in the Interwar period)

Mile Starčević (15 September 1904 – 9 March 1953) was a politician born in Gospić, Kingdom of Croatia-Slavonia, Austria-Hungary. He studied philosophy, graduating and attaining a PhD from the University of Zagreb in 1932. During the study, he was convicted and imprisoned for opposing the regime in 1930. In late 1930s, Starčević was the administrator of the Zagreb City Library and the economic secretary of the Matica hrvatska, and a member of the Croatian Federalist Peasant Party (a splinter group from the Croatian Peasant Party (HSS)). After the April 1941 Invasion of Yugoslavia during the World War II and establishment of the Independent State of Croatia (NDH) as a puppet state collaborating with the occupying Axis powers, Starčević became the general secretary of Matica hrvatska in August 1941 and a head of a department of the Ministry of Education in February 1942. He became the minister of the same ministry in October 1942, and held the position for a year – resigning the post after Nikola Mandić became the prime minister. In 1943, acting on instructions of the NDH leader Ante Pavelić, Starčević unsuccessfully negotiated with representatives of the HSS aimed at gaining the party's political support for Pavelić's regime. In 1945, after the defeat of the NDH, Starčević fled to Austria and then Italy where he remained in a refugee camp until 1947 before moving to Argentina.
