= Oton Vinski =

- Oton Vinski with his dog
- Born: 20 March 1877; Osijek, Austro-Hungarian Empire, (now Croatia)
- Died: 1942 (aged 65); Jasenovac concentration camp
- Cause of death: Murdered in Holocaust
- Occupation: Banker
- Spouse: Štefanija Vinski (née Alexander)
- Children: Zdenko Vinski; Ivo Vinski
- Parent(s): Franjo and Berta Weiss

Oton Vinski (born Otto Weiss; 20 March 1877 – 1942) was an influential Croatian banker who was killed during the Holocaust.

Vinski was born in Osijek on 20 March 1877, as Otto Weiss, to a Jewish family of Franjo and Berta Weiss. Vinski was married to Štefanija (née Alexander) Vinski, of the notable Zagreb Jewish family, Alexander. Together they had two sons: Zdenko and Ivo. In 1918, Vinski changed his name and surname. He was employed as a procurator and chief executive of the Croatian Discount Bank in Zagreb. During World War II, Vinski was arrested and deported to Jasenovac concentration camp together with his mother in law Ilka Alexander, where they were both killed in 1942. When his wife returned home, nobody was left. By mere chance Vinski's wife and sons had survived the Holocaust. His wife died in Zagreb in 1959.

== Bibliography ==
- Goldstein, Ivo (2005). Židovi u Zagrebu 1918 - 1941. Zagreb: Novi Liber. ISBN 953-6045-23-0.
