= Croatian Institute of History =

Nonprofit organization in Zagreb, Croatia

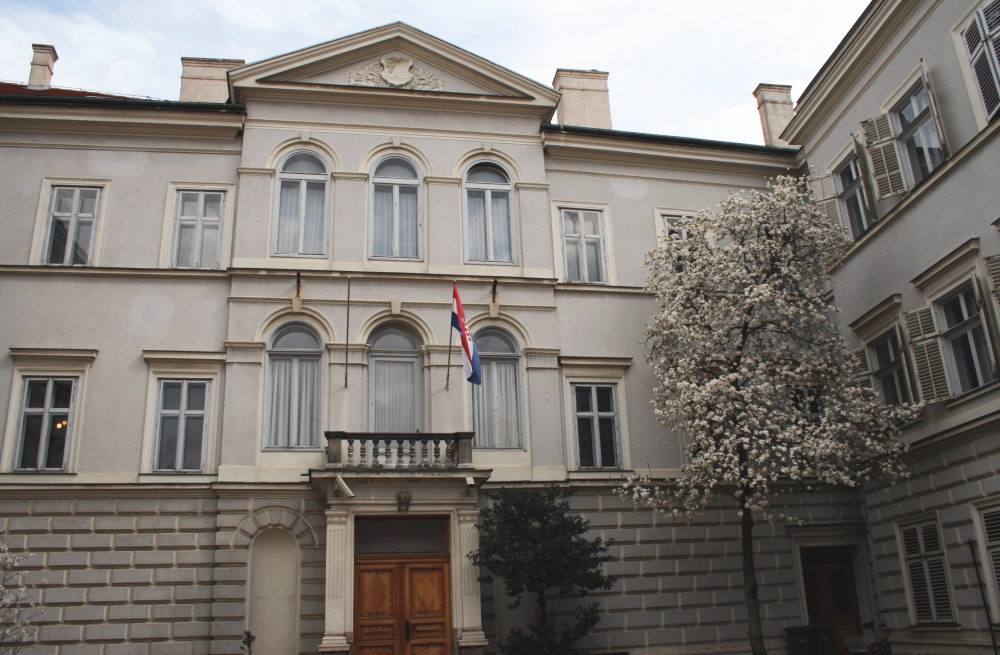
- Other name: Croatian: Hrvatski institut za povijest
- Established: 1 October 1961; 64 years ago
- Focus: History of Croatia
- Formerly called: Institute for the History of the Workers' Movement in Croatia (1961–1990); Institute for Contemporary History (1990–1996)
- Address: Opatička 10, Zagreb, Croatia
- Coordinates: 45°49′02″N 15°58′31″E
- Interactive map of Croatian Institute of History
- Website: www.isp.hr

The Croatian Institute of History (Croatian: Hrvatski institut za povijest), abbreviated as HIP, is a public, non-profit scientific research institute in the field of history of Croatia. The institute was established in 1961 under the name of the Institute for the History of the Workers' Movement in Croatia. The institute is located in Zagreb with one regional branch in Slavonski Brod.

The first director of the institute, in the period between 1961 and 1967, was Franjo Tuđman, who would later become the first president of Croatia.

The institute publishes four scholarly journals: Časopis za suvremenu povijest (Journal of Contemporary History), Povijesni prilozi (Historical Contributions) and Scrinia Slavonica in Croatian and Review of Croatian History in English language. The institute employs approximately 70 researchers at its main location in Zagreb, with an additional 20 staff members working at its branch in Slavonski Brod.

== History ==
Current logo of the Croatian Institute of History

The establishment of communist rule after World War II had a dual impact on Croatian historiography, politicizing historical writing with Marxist interpretations while also spurring the growth of new institutions and increasing the number of historians, contributing to the discipline's development. The Institute for the History of Croatian Workers' Movement was established in 1961. It incorporated the Archive for the History of the Workers' Movement, which originated from the archival department of the Central Committee of the Communist Party of Croatia in 1949.

Between 1964 and 1967, the institute published Putovi revolucije (Paths of the Revolution), a journal focusing on revolutionary history, which ceased publication after nine issues.

The 1990s in Croatia were marked by significant politicization of historiography, influenced by the nationalist agenda of the newly independent state which at the time was engaged in the Croatian War of Independence. Prominent political figures, including the first president, Franjo Tuđman, played a central role in intertwining history and politics. Tuđman, himself a historian and former director of the institute, was celebrated in academia following his election as president. His bibliography was published in the Journal of Contemporary History.

The institution was named Institute for Contemporary History (Institut za suvremenu povijest) between 1990 and 1996. A branch was established in Slavonski Brod in 1996, focusing on the history of Slavonia, Syrmia and Baranya. Between 1961 and 1991, there was an institute of history in Slavonski Brod, initially named the Centre for the Research of the Workers' Movement and the People's Liberation Movement. During second Yugoslavia, analogous historical institutes were created elsewhere, such as the Institute for the History of the Workers' Movement in Dalmatia or the Institute for the History of the Workers' Movement in Belgrade.

== See also ==
- Croatian historiography
