= Milan Heimerl =

Croatian politician and lawyer (1876–1917)

- Born: 15 August 1876; Križevci, Kingdom of Croatia-Slavonia, Austria-Hungary (now Croatia)
- Died: 10 July 1917 (aged 40); Križevci
- Education: University of Zagreb; Charles University
- Occupations: Politician, lawyer and publicist
- Political party: Croatian Party of Rights; Croatian Progressive Party; Croatian Independent Party; Croat-Serb Coalition

Milan Heimerl (15 August 1876 – 10 July 1917) was a Croatian politician and lawyer. During Emperor Franz Joseph's 1895 visit to Zagreb, Heimerl took part as a student in a protest in which the Hungarian flag was burnt. He joined the Progressive Youth movement and pursued careers in law and politics, unsuccessfully running for a seat in the Sabor in three parliamentary elections in the Kingdom of Croatia-Slavonia, which was then a part of Austria-Hungary. He served in the Croatian Party of Rights and co-founded the Croatian Progressive Party, and was a newspaper editor. Throughout his political career, Heimerl advocated cooperation between Croats and Serbs to further South Slavic interests in Austria-Hungary. Heimerl was most active in politics and journalism, editing and publishing journals and newspapers affiliated with the parties he supported, between 1902 and early 1910s when his focus shifted to practising law.

== Student years ==
Heimerl studied at the Faculty of Law, University of Zagreb. However, he engaged alongside other students in the burning of the Hungarian flag during the 1895 visit to Zagreb by Emperor Franz Joseph, and this led to his expulsion. On the final day of the emperor's visit, Vladimir Vidrić led 70 to 80 students in marching from the university to Ban Jelačić Square, where they burnt the tricolour flag. Stjepan Radić devised the protest; he had previously been expelled from Zagreb University for political activities. The students said the protest was a response to violations of the Croatian–Hungarian Settlement, which restricted Croatian political autonomy to internal affairs.

In Hungary, despite the guarantees regarding Croatian autonomy, many Croats saw the Settlement as an attempt by the Hungarian state to fully integrate Croatia, and the Hungarian government's policies threatened Croatian autonomy. Heimerl was convicted for his role in the protest and sentenced to two months in prison. He studied thereafter in Vienna and then Prague. In Prague, he was a co-editor of the journal Hrvatska misao in 1897. In that period, he joined the Croatian Progressive Youth movement, which held liberal and Pan-Slavist views and sought separation of church and state.

== Political career ==
After returning to Zagreb as a member of the Progressive Youth, Heimerl sought to consolidate various political parties in Croatia. In 1902, the Independent People's Party and the Party of Rights merged under the name the Croatian Opposition (Croatian: Hrvatska opozicija), with Aleksandar Bresztyenszky as party leader. The following year, several Progressive Youth members who had returned to Croatia formed the Croatian Party of Rights (HSP) and joined the bloc. Heimerl was one of these members, along with Stjepan Radić, Milivoj Dežman, Milan Marjanović, and Milutin Cihlar Nehajev. Heimerl served on the HSP's executive committee.

In 1903, a minority of the opposition, including the Progressive Youth, launched a series of public assemblies to rally supporters to strengthen Croatia-Slavonia's constitutional position within Austria-Hungary. This movement became known as the Croatian National Movement of 1903. By May, the movement saw violent protests in multiple cities, leading to the imprisonment of Progressive Youth figures. Heimerl organised rallies against the policies of the Ban of Croatia, Károly Khuen-Héderváry. He was charged with inciting a protest on 24 April 1903 in his native Križevci. The protest opposed the prohibition of rallies and led to a violent confrontation with police, resulting in 24 arrests. Milan Heimerl, Lav Mazzura, and Josip Pasarić were convicted and sentenced to two months in prison.

Between 1901 and 1904, Heimerl edited the Obzor, the gazette of the Party of Rights. In December 1904, he co-founded the Croatian Progressive Party, and he published and edited the new party's newspaper Pokret. The party, led by Ivan Lorković, sought financial independence of Croatia from Hungary. To achieve that goal, it was willing to cooperate politically with the Croatian Serbs. Heimerl himself believed Croats needed to cooperate with Serbs. He ran several times unsuccessfully as a candidate for the Sabor, first in the 1906 Croatian parliamentary election in the Garčin district and then in the 1908 Croatian parliamentary election in the Križevci and Čazma districts. In 1908, he became a member of the central committee of the Croatian Independent Party, a merger of the HSP and the Croatian People's Progressive Party. He ran once more in the Križevci district in the 1913 Croatian parliamentary election, as a candidate for the Croat-Serb Coalition.

== Legal career ==
After graduating from university, Heimerl worked for two years in Bohemian judiciary, from 1900 to 1902. From around 1910, he began to focus more on politics and journalism. He moved to Križevci and worked with his brother as a clerk in a law office before receiving a licence to practise law independently. During the First World War, authorities kept him under surveillance. Heimerl died in Križevci on 10 July 1917.

== Sources ==
- Banac, Ivo (1984). The National Question in Yugoslavia: Origins, History, Politics. Ithaca, New York: Cornell University Press. ISBN 0-8014-1675-2.
- Gabelica, Mislav (2024). "Pravaštvo u Križevcima koncem 19. i početkom 20. stoljeća: prilog političkoj povijesti Križevaca" [The Party of Rights in Križevci in the Late 19th and the Early 20th Century: A Contribution to the Political History of Križevci]. Cris: Časopis Povijesnog društva Križevci (in Croatian). 26 (1). Križevci: Povijesno društvo Križevci: 101–120. ISSN 1332-2567.
- Kent, Sarah A. (2009). "State Ritual and Ritual Parody: Croatian Student Protest and the Limits of Loyalty at the End of the Nineteenth Century". In Cole, Laurence; Unowsky, Daniel (eds.). The Limits of Loyalty: Imperial Symbolism, Popular Allegiances, and State Patriotism in the Late Habsburg Monarchy. New York: Berghahn Books. pp. 162–177. ISBN 978-1-84545-202-5.
- Kolar-Dimitrijević, Mira (2003). "Stjepan Radić i Kunovečka buna 1903. godine" [Stjepan Radić and Kunovec Rebellion in 1903]. Podravina: časopis za multidisciplinarna istraživanja (in Croatian). 2 (4). Koprivnica: Sveučilište Sjever: 57–74. ISSN 1333-5286.
- Matković, Stjepan (2002). "Heimerl, Milan". Croatian Biographical Lexicon (in Croatian). Miroslav Krleža Institute of Lexicography.
- Miller, Nicholas J. (2010). Between Nation and State: Serbian Politics in Croatia Before the First World War. University of Pittsburgh Press. ISBN 978-0-8229-7722-3.
- Šenoa, Zdenko (1989). "Bresztyenszky, Aleksandar". Croatian Biographical Lexicon (in Croatian). Miroslav Krleža Institute of Lexicography.
