= 1895 visit by Emperor Franz Joseph to Zagreb =

Visit by the Austrian Emperor to Croatia marked by local protests

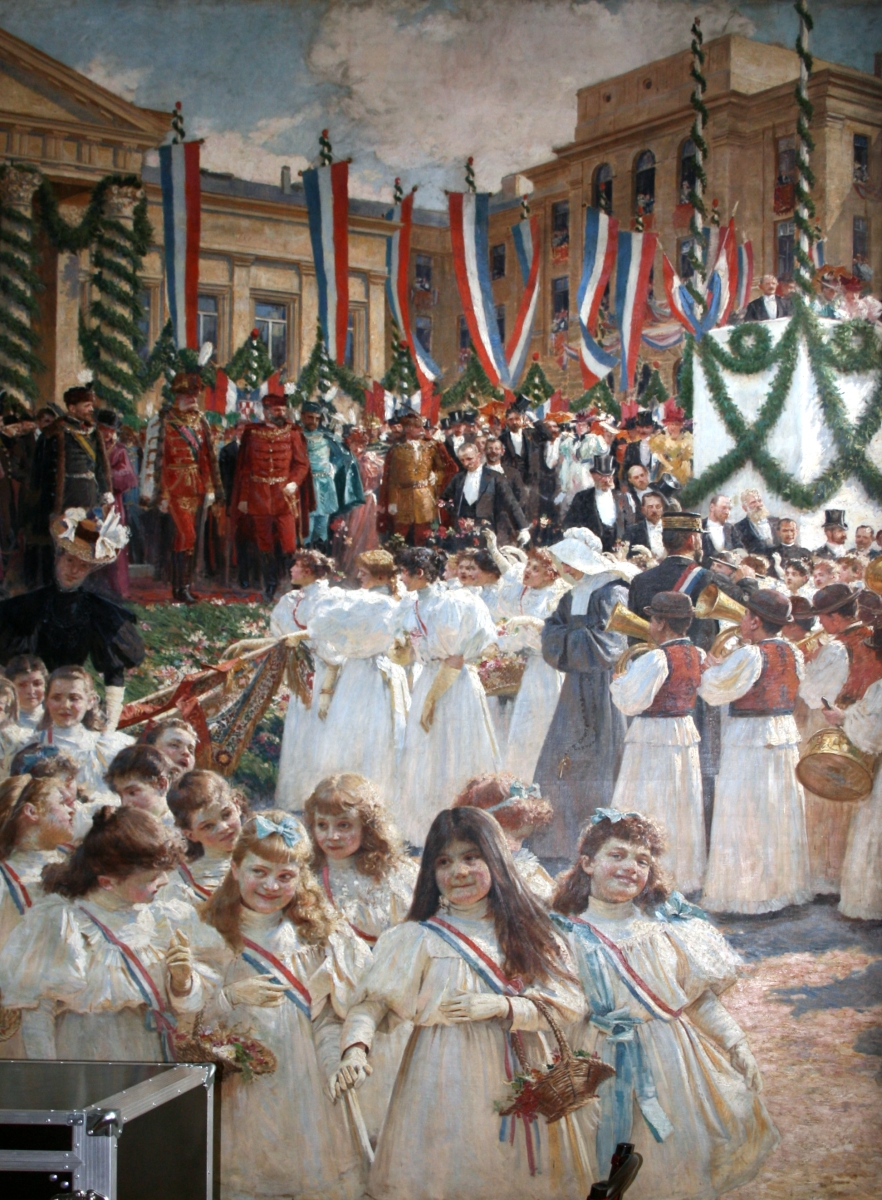
Painting by Vlaho Bukovac commemorating the visit

On the initiative of Croatian ban Károly Khuen-Héderváry, in mid-October 1895 Austro-Hungarian Emperor Franz Joseph visited Zagreb, at the time the capital of the Kingdom of Croatia–Slavonia, in order to attend the opening of the Croatian National Theatre. A group of Croatian students used the visit to protest the rule of the Hungarian Khuen-Héderváry as Croatian ban. They were led by Stjepan Radić, who would later form the influential Croatian People's Peasant Party.

== Events ==
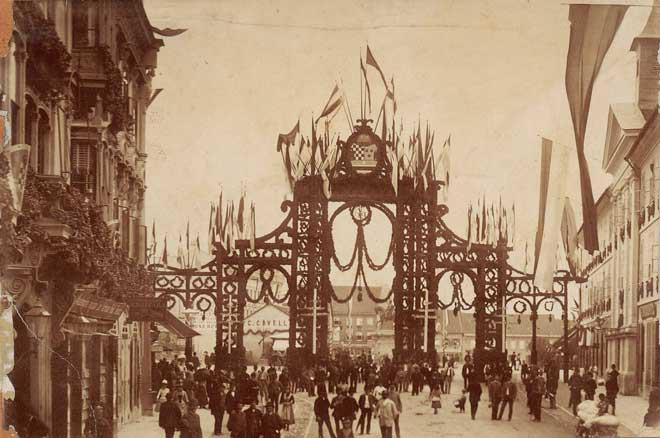
The main triumphal arch, erected for the occasion, was decorated with a Hungarian flag, which was widely resented among the Croatian opposition.

The emperor arrived in Zagreb by train on October 14, 1895. Upon his arrival a group of students chanted "Slava Jelačiću" ("Glory to Jelačić"), in reference to the former Croatian ban Josip Jelačić who had risen up against the Hungarians in the Revolutions of 1848. That day the emperor attended the unveiling ceremonial completion of the Croatian National Theatre. Music by Ivan Zajc was subsequently performed inside the theatre.

The following day, the emperor attended an honorary dance at the Kolo building. On this day a group of students led by Stjepan Radić, then a 24-year-old student of the Faculty of Law, planned a burning of the Hungarian tricolour.

On October 16, the final day of the imperial visit, the students marched to Ban Jelačić Square where they chanted "Živio hrvatski kralj Franjo Josip I" ("Long live Croatian king Franz Joseph I"), "Slava Jelačiću" and "Abzug Magjari" ("Away with Hungarians"). They doused the Hungarian tricolour in brandy and set it on fire. They then marched towards the University of Zagreb. The city police soon informed ban Khuen-Héderváry of the act, and he ordered that the students be arrested. By the end of the following day, 24 were arrested, Radić among them.

== Aftermath ==
The students were subsequently charged for the incident. Stjepan Radić was sentenced to six months in jail, Gjuro Balaško to five, and Milan Dorwald, Osman Hadžić, Vladimir Vidrić, Josip Šikutrić, Vladimir Frank and Ivo Frank to four months, while others (including Milan Heimerl, Živko Bertić, and Gjuro Červar) were mostly sentenced to two months. The students were all barred from the University of Zagreb while Stjepan Radić was barred from all universities in the empire. This led him to continue his studies abroad in Paris. The other students went to the Charles University in Prague and the University of Vienna.

These students would form the basis of the Croatian Moderna and the Progressive Youth, a cultural and a political movement respectively, active at the turn of the century, characterized by anti-traditionalism, cosmopolitanism, and focus on artistic freedom. In 1897, the Prague group of students began publishing Hrvatska misao, while in 1898 the Vienna students began publishing Mladost.

The flag burning also resulted in a schism within the Party of Rights. Its leader Fran Folnegović distanced himself from the incident, and the dissenters, headed by Ante Starčević and Josip Frank, formed a splinter party, Croatian Pure Party of Rights.

The flag burning incident impacted the coverage of the celebration of the Hungarian Millenium in 1896 in Croatia, but the business community still participated at the exposition in Budapest, which later led to the creation of the Art Pavilion in Zagreb.

== See also ==
- Unveiling of the Gundulić monument (1893)
