= Progressive Youth (Croatia) =

1897–1904 Croatian political organisation

Progressive Youth Napredna omladina
- Leader: Ivan Lorković
- Founders: Stjepan Radić
- Founded: 1897; 129 years ago
- Dissolved: 1904; 122 years ago
- Merged into: Croatian Party of Rights; Croatian Progressive Party; Croat-Serb Coalition
- Ideology: Yugoslavism

The Progressive Youth (Croatian: Napredna omladina) was a political organisation predominantly active in the Kingdom of Croatia-Slavonia, a realm of Austria-Hungary in the late 19th and early 20th centuries. The group, consisting of Zagreb University students initially led by Stjepan Radić, emerged in relation to consequences of a protest against Magyarisation policies of the government held during the 1895 visit by Emperor Franz Joseph to Zagreb. The protesters were briefly imprisoned and expelled from the Zagreb University. Most of them continued their education in Prague. Initially led by Radić, the Progressive Youth announced its advocation of unity of Croats and Serbs on the basis of Yugoslavist ideas in their Hrvatska misao journal. The Prague-based students kept contact with like-minded colleagues in Zagreb.

The Progressive Youth contributed to a realignment of political parties in Croatia-Slavonia at the beginning of the 20th century. This was achieved by supporting the unification of the opposition Party of Rights and the Independent People's Party into the Croatian Party of Rights. After a brief period, the Progressive Youth joined the Croatian Party of Rights. The Progressive Youth figures launched a campaign of public assemblies in protest against Magyarisation in what became known as the Croatian National Movement of 1903. While the campaign struggled to attract support from other Croatian opposition groups, the Serb Independent Party gave the progressives its support. By 1904, Ivan Lorković and other prominent former members of the Progressive Youth had formed the Croatian Progressive Party.

The Croatian Progressive Party supported the 1903 New Course Policy initiative proposed by Dalmatian Party of Rights leaders. The policy proposed supporting Hungarian opposition in its demands for a revision of the Austro-Hungarian Compromise of 1867 favouring greater Hungarian autonomy from the central government while obtaining support for the unification of the Austro-Hungarian realms of Croatia-Slavonia and Dalmatia. The Croatian Progressive Party supported the initiative and successfully lobbied the Croatian Party of Rights and the Serb Independent Party for endorsement of the New Course Policy because it saw the initiative as an opportunity for greater Croat–Serb cooperation. On the basis of this support, the Croat-Serb Coalition was formed in 1905, and following the 1906 Croatian parliamentary election, the coalition became the most powerful political grouping in Croatia-Slavonia until the dissolution of Austria-Hungary in 1918. The coalition adopted the Yugoslavist ideas put forward by the Progressive Youth, such as the concept of national oneness of the Croats and the Serbs.

== Background ==
Austria–Hungary
Kingdoms and countries of Austria–Hungary:
Cisleithania (Empire of Austria): 1. Bohemia, 2. Bukovina, 3. Carinthia, 4. Carniola, 5. Dalmatia, 6. Galicia, 7. Küstenland, 8. Lower Austria, 9. Moravia, 10. Salzburg, 11. Silesia, 12. Styria, 13. Tyrol, 14. Upper Austria, 15. Vorarlberg;
Transleithania (Kingdom of Hungary): 16. Hungary proper 17. Croatia-Slavonia;
Austro-Hungarian condominium: 18. Bosnia and Herzegovina

In the late 19th century, the politics of the Kingdom of Croatia-Slavonia, a realm of Austria-Hungary at the time, were dominated by the outcomes of the Austro-Hungarian Compromise of 1867 and the Croatian–Hungarian Settlement of 1868. The former divided the lands inhabited by significant Croat populations between Austrian- and Hungarian-ruled halves of the empire. Dalmatia and Istria were ruled by Vienna, while Croatia-Slavonia was a part of the Arch-Kingdom of Hungary. The Croatian–Hungarian Settlement upheld but also curbed Croatian political autonomy, restricting it to internal affairs. In Hungary, regardless of the guarantees regarding Croatian autonomy, the Settlement was viewed as a step towards full integration of Croatia into the Hungarian state, and the Hungarian government's policies threatened the Croatian autonomy. As this position became better known, the Croats increasingly opposed the Settlement. The unicameral Sabor was authorised to legislate the matters within the scope of Croatia's autonomy. The Sabor was elected, but the electoral laws limited suffrage by means of property qualification to about 2% of the population. The Ban of Croatia was appointed by the Emperor in consultation with the Prime Minister of Hungary as the head of the executive. The appointment guaranteed Hungarian control over Croatia's autonomous affairs.

Following the 1883 Anti-Hungarian protests in Croatia motivated by gradual infringement against Croatia's autonomy, the Hungarian government imposed martial law in Croatia-Slavonia and shortly afterwards appointed Károly Khuen-Héderváry the Ban of Croatia. Khuen-Héderváry's rule was marked by Magyarisation of Croatia in breach of the proclaimed guarantees offered by the Settlement. (Note: The offending measures included the introduction of bilingual signage on official buildings in Croatian and Hungarian languages, the introduction of Hungarian as the teaching language in civil service schools and in railways in Croatia-Slavonia, the placing of the Hungarian arms on buildings in Croatia-Slavonia, and an order to change place names to conform to Hungarian preferences. A further point of contention rose from the fact that German- or Hungarian-speaking landowners employed Hungarian-speaking estate administrators who brought immigrant labour while the number of Croats moving to the United States was rapidly increasing. The conflict gave rise to the Croatian ethnolinguistic national movement.) Khuen-Héderváry ruled with the support of the Sabor majority, largely consisting of the representatives of the People's Party. The parliamentary majority was assured by gerrymandering and suffrage granted to just 2% of the total population – the wealthiest taxpayers and civil servants. Disciplinary measures were introduced to penalise civil servants who voted against the government, and political suitability was a requirement for appointment of civil servants and public notaries. The supporters were provided with government subsidies for their businesses and promised favours of the Hungarian government. Khuen-Héderváry also had the support of Croatian Serbs who formed the Serbian Club within the People's Party. He sought to use the Serbs to redirect hatred of the Croatian population from the regime to Serbs through political favouritism, including enactment of legislation to legalise use of the Serbian language and the Cyrillic alphabet in Croatia-Slavonia and partially repealing the law secularising education in relation to schools operated by the Patriarchate of Karlovci. (Note: The law enacted in 1874 under Ban Ivan Mažuranić secularised the education in Croatia-Slavonia – placing the state in control of the schools previously controlled by the Catholic Church and the Serbian Orthodox Church. The move was meant to replicate the education system already in place elsewhere in Austria-Hungary.) In turn, the Serbs became prominent exponents of Khuen-Héderváry's rule. He exploited political issues related to the Croatian Serbs with the aim of sowing divisions in order to facilitate his rule. As a result of the Ban's policies, divisions between Croats and Serbs deepened.

The main Croatian parliamentary opposition consisted of the Party of Rights and the Independent People's Party, the latter being formed by dissidents splitting from the People's Party in 1880. The Party of Rights found most of its support among the younger urban intelligentsia, while the Independent People's Party base of support was among the middle-aged urban intelligentsia and the Catholic Church. Both parties suffered from poor organisation and being led by part-time politicians. Even though the two opposition parties concluded an electoral alliance, (Note: The electoral alliance of the Party of Rights and the Independent People's Party existed from 1897 to 1902, and it was known as the Udružena opozicija (lit. 'United Opposition').) they were divided over the possibility of political cooperation with the Croatian Serbs (and the Slovenes as fellow South Slavs living in Austria-Hungary). Both parties were met with mistrust from Croatian Serbs, in a large part due to their advocation of the Croatian state right (Note: Croatian nationalism fought against the Magyarisation of Croatia and Croats by defining Croatia as a political entity not relying on ethnicity. This made Croatian statehood, along with the principle of self-determination, key to the formation of the Croatian nation. The Serbs saw the advocation of Croatian statehood as a denial of the possibility of any autonomous pursuit of politics by the Serbs in Croatia.) and the conflicting views about the fate of Bosnia and Herzegovina following the 1878 Austro-Hungarian occupation. There were concurrent conflicting territorial claims against all of Bosnia and Herzegovina. The Serbs hoped Bosnia and Herzegovina would be attached to the Principality of Serbia following the Herzegovina uprising, and the Croats expected Austria-Hungary to give the territory to Croatia following the 1878 occupation. In the case of the Party of Rights, a particular problem for cooperation with the Serbs was that the party's founder, Ante Starčević, claimed that the Serbs are not a distinct nation but Orthodox Croats. (Note: According to historian Nicholas J. Miller, Starčević was motivated by the opposite claim by Vuk Karadžić that Croats are not a distinct nation but Serbs converted to Catholicism.) Cooperation between the Croatian Serb politicians and the Independent People's Party was difficult to achieve due to the former's suspicions towards the role of the Catholic priests in the party.

== Emergence ==
A wide-ranging youth movement started to take shape in Croatia-Slavonia in 1895. Its two components were the Croatian modernists and the Progressive Youth in the fields of art and politics, respectively. The political movement emerged in relation to a protest by Zagreb University students on the occasion of a visit by Emperor Franz Joseph to Zagreb. During the visit, three protests took place. On the first day of the Imperial visit, a group including Ivo Frank, a son of a prominent member of the Party of Rights, Josip Frank, created a disturbance at the Serbian Orthodox Cathedral, calling for removal of a Serbian tricolour flown at the church building. Then, Ivo's brother Vladimir joined a group unsuccessfully attempting to remove a Hungarian flag placed on a triumphal arch erected for the Imperial visit near the Main Railway Station. In response, a few ethnic Hungarians assaulted the Frank brothers to avenge the attack against the Hungarian flag. On the final day of the Emperor's visit, a group of 70 to 80 students, led by Vladimir Vidrić, marched from the university to the Ban Jelačić Square and burnt a Hungarian tricolour. The flag burning protest, devised by Stjepan Radić, who had already been expelled from the Zagreb University for political activities, was explained by the students as directed against violations of the Settlement.

Fifty-three people were arrested and brought to a trial for participation in the flag burning on charges of disruption of public order. Following a five-day trial, all the defendants except four were convicted and sentenced to imprisonment for two to six months. At the same time, the university expelled them. Croatian members of the Imperial Council elected in Dalmatia and Istria—Juraj Biankini, Matko Laginja, and Vjekoslav Spinčić—issued a declaration of support for the students and a call for donations to allow the expelled students to pursue their studies abroad. In response, a committee to assist the expelled students was established and chaired by Šime Mazzura, one of the Independent People's Party's founders and leaders. Substantial funds were collected. Radić persuaded a part of the group to move to Prague with him and study there, and a student-assistance committee was chaired by Prague city council member and mayor Jan Podlipný. In late 1895, six students belonging to the group were enrolled, with an additional twelve the next year and another 22 by 1898. The group became commonly referred to as the Progressive Youth (Croatian: Napredna omladina) before their return to Croatia-Slavonia.

== Student movement ==
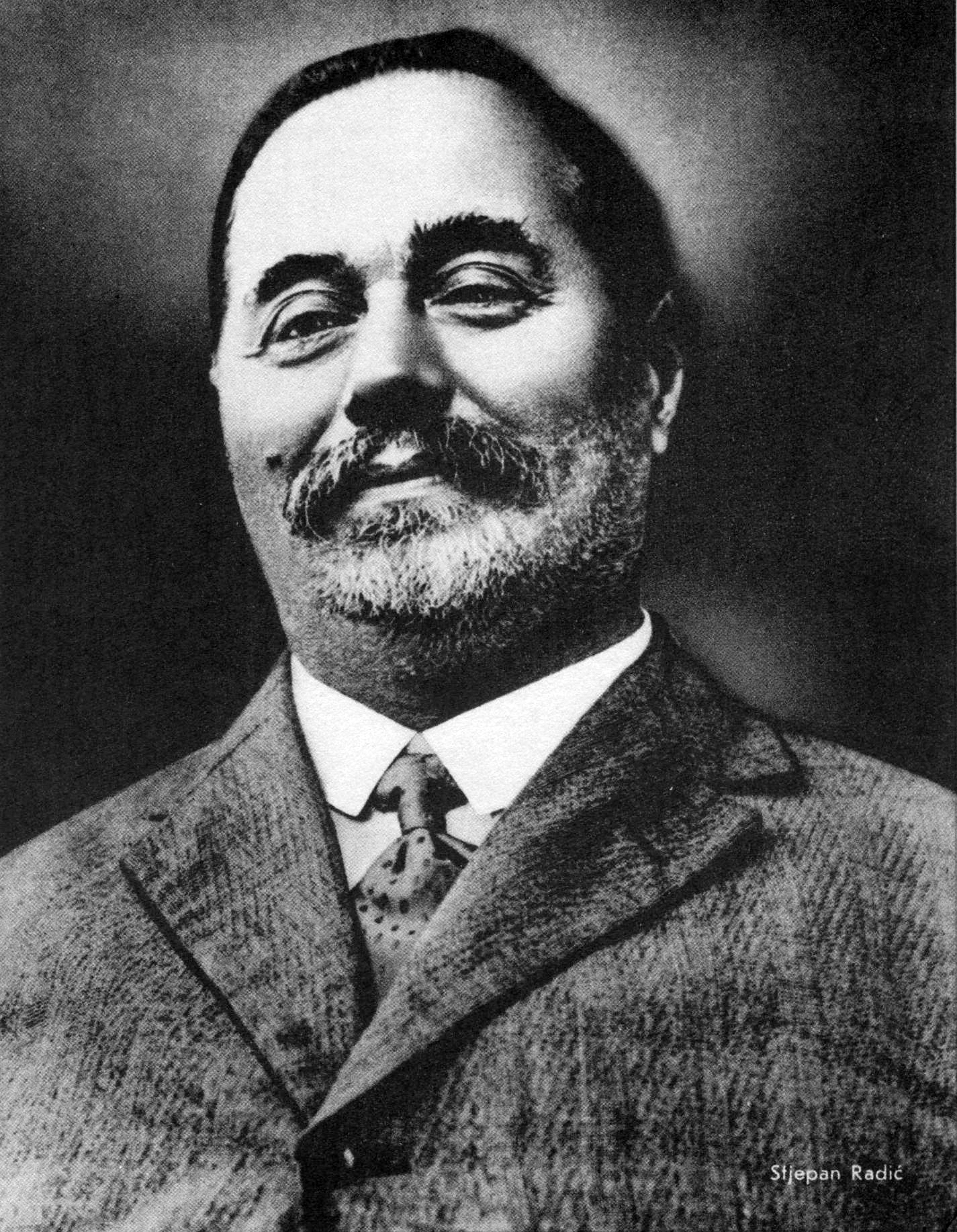
Stjepan Radić was the initial leader of the Progressive Youth.

In Prague, the Progressive Youth became influenced by the ideas of Tomáš Masaryk, especially the concept of realistic "small deeds" in work with the lower social classes and the concept of self-determination. Under these influences, they developed the concept of the national oneness (Croatian: narodno jedinstvo) of the Croats and Serbs that would be central to unitarist Yugoslavism and support the creation of a single independent state in the territory inhabited by the Croats and Serbs. The students based in Prague, inspired and led by Radić, (Note: Radić was expelled from Zagreb and Prague universities for political protests. He moved from Prague to Paris and enrolled in Sciences Po in 1897.) started publication of Hrvatska misao (lit. 'Croatian Thought') journal to promote its political views in January–July 1897. The journal's editorial board and major contributors consisted of František Hlaváček, Radić, Živko Bertić, Milan Heimerl, Svetimir Korporić, Franjo Poljak, and Milan Mihajlo Šarić. In the first issue, Radić published an article explaining the group's positions—advocating unity of Croats and Serbs on the basis of Yugoslavism. According to historian Nikola Tomašegović, the start of the publication of Hrvatska misao represents the establishment of the Progressive Youth. The Prague-based group later also published the Novo doba (lit. 'New Age') and Glas (lit. 'Voice') journals. The final issue of the Glas was published in Vienna in 1900.

The Progressive Youth movement was not limited to Prague alone. There was a Zagreb- and Karlovac-based group organised around Nada and Nova nada journals and another group associated with the Narodna misao (lit. 'National Idea') almanack. The almanack was launched in the spring of 1897 as a publication by the Zagreb-based United Croat and Serb Academic Youth. The groups believed that the joint opposition to the Hungarian rule would bring social and economic benefits to Croatia. Contributors and editors of the Narodna misao were Jovan Banjanin, Milan Kostić, Ivan Lorković, Dušan Mangjer, Lav Mazzura, and Svetozar Pribićević. It contained political articles and letters of public personalities on the topic of the Croat–Serb relations. Pribićević first publicised his idea of national oneness, the notion that the Croats and the Serbs were one people in reality, in the Narodna misao. The United Croat and Serb Academic Youth split along ethnic lines in 1900. According to historian Nicholas J. Miller, the Croat component of the Prague-Zagreb Group became known as the Progressive Youth.

Croatian encyclopedist Mate Ujević described the Progressive Youth as a socio-political, nationalist, and realist component of the Croatian modernist movement. (Note: The majority of sources identify the Croatian modernist movement's artistic, aesthetic and cosmopolitan component as the Vienna Group.) He referred to the Prague-based group as the "realists", the Naša misao group as the "nationalists", and the Nada group as the "progressives". Most sources refer to the three groups jointly, in the context of literature, as the Prague Group or the Prague-Zagreb Group. According to Ujević, the movement was uncoordinated and only became coherent in 1901 when its members, who were still willing to be active politically, returned to Croatia-Slavonia.

== Integration with political parties ==
As the Progressive Youth members were returning to Croatia-Slavonia in the late 1890s, the movement was taking on the role of an opposition movement contributing to a realignment of political parties in the country. In that respect, they urged others to prioritise cooperation of South Slavic peoples over the Croatian state right. In January 1902, the Progressive Youth relaunched Hrvatska misao in Zagreb. The most significant contributors were Radić, Heimerl, Lorković, and Korporić, as well as Milivoj Dežman and Milan Krištof. The same month, following a heavy defeat at the 1901 Croatian parliamentary election, the Independent People's Party and the Party of Rights decided to merge, forming the Croatian Party of Rights (Croatian: Hrvatska stranka prava, HSP). (Note: The party was initially named the Croatian Opposition (Croatian: Hrvatska oporba) and renamed the HSP in September 1902.) The Progressive Youth welcomed the development and promised cooperation but declined to join the new party. The HSP elected Radić the party secretary. The merger followed the 1895 split in the Party of Rights when the Frankists, as hardline advocates of Starčević's political views, left to form the Pure Party of Rights and seven years of fighting between the mainstream and the dissidents.

In August 1902, the Hungarian government arranged the reprinting of the article Serbs and Croats, originally published by Nikola Stojanović in Serbia, to incite ethnic hatred between the Croats and the Serbs. The article, reprinted by the Zagreb-based Srbobran newspaper of the Serb Independent Party (Serbian: Srpska samostalna stranka, SSS), threatened extermination of the Croats through assimilation by the Serbs. In his text, Stojanović welcomed the work of the Progressive Youth, claiming it helped the process of assimilation. The ensuing riots targeting Serb businesses and homes in Zagreb were led by the Frankists and only incited further by the police. While Radić condemned the riots, the Progressive Youth publicly only denounced the article and stayed silent on the riots. This led to a pause in cooperation with the former Serb Academic Youth members. Pribićević and Banjanin, as prominent members of the Serb Academic Youth, had asked the SSS to admit them, only to be rejected by the party. During the riots, Khuen-Héderváry ordered the publication of Srbobran to stop. The party resumed its publishing in December 1902 as the Novi srbobran following a change of its ideology away from cooperation with the Hungarians towards the ideas of the progressives. Pribićević was appointed the party secretary, and he and Banjanin became the newspaper's editors. In January 1903, the Progressive Youth became a part of the HSP.

== Croatian National Movement ==
In March 1903, a minority of the opposition, including the Progressive Youth, launched a series of public assemblies to rally supporters for improvement of Croatia-Slavonia's constitutional position in what became known as the Croatian National Movement of 1903. By May, the movement saw violent protests in multiple cities, and Progressive Youth figures, including Lorković, Lav Mazzura, Franko Potočnjak, and Milan Marjanović, were imprisoned over their involvement. Other opposition leaders did not fully support the protests, except the SSS. It joined the movement in late 1903, supporting a number of popular assemblies and organising some rallies on its own. Even though the movement led to no constitutional changes, it was significant as the beginning of the involvement of the wider public in political life, as the assemblies were attended by a growing number of peasants. The Croatian National Movement also reinforced the appeal of the idea of unifying Croatia, Slavonia, and Dalmatia into the Triune Kingdom. An obstacle to the design was that the two realms belonged to different parts of Austria-Hungary: Hungarian-dominated Transleithania and Austrian-ruled Cisleithania, respectively.

== Legacy ==
Leaders of the Party of Rights operating in Dalmatia, Ante Trumbić and Frano Supilo, saw the then dispute between Austria and Hungary regarding Hungarian demands for partition of the Common Army as an opportunity to challenge the dualist constitution of Austria-Hungary and achieve unification of Croatia-Slavonia and Dalmatia. Trumbić presented his and Supilo's idea in a speech at the Diet of Dalmatia on 7 November 1903, advocating support for Hungary's anti-dualist Party of Independence and '48 in return for Hungarian support for the addition of Dalmatia to Croatia-Slavonia despite the dualist constitution. Trumbić and Supilo named the initiative the New Course Policy (Croatian: Politika novoga kursa).

The initiative was met with scepticism in Croatia-Slavonia, and only the HSP members associated with the Progressive Youth, led by Lorković, endorsed it. Lorković thought the initiative would be a platform for cooperation with Croatian Serb political parties. In order to promote the idea, the group launched the Pokret (lit. 'Movement') journal in April 1904. Pokret was also used to attack Radić politically. Namely, at the general assembly of the Hrvatska poljoprivredna banka, Radić questioned the motives for a commission paid by the bank in a commercial transaction. Since the board of directors of the bank included members of the central committee of the HSP, the party sacked Radić from his post as the party secretary. Some of the former Progressive Youth members, such as Krištof and Korporić, were also dismissed as Radić's allies, but most of the progressives remained in the HSP. In the final year of his tenure as the HSP secretary, Radić had already broken with the former Progressive Youth.

In December 1904, the progressives, led by Lorković, formally established the Croatian Progressive Party, hoping to attract more popular support for the party's programme calling for financial independence of Croatia from Hungary and political cooperation with the Croatian Serbs. By 1905, the New Course Policy was accepted by the SSS and the HSP, and the Croat-Serb Coalition (Croatian: Hrvatsko-srpska koalicija, HSK) was formed on that platform. The Social Democratic Party of Croatia and Slavonia also joined the HSK, largely due to good relations between the party and the Progressive Youth figures.

The HSK stood in the 1906 Croatian parliamentary election. Even though the People's Party won a plurality of seats, the party left the Sabor. The Croatian Progressive Party did not win any seats in the election. The HSK formed the government in agreement with Khuen-Héderváry's successor, Teodor Pejačević. Shortly afterwards, the HSK abandoned the New Course Policy. The HSK remained the strongest political group in Croatia-Slavonia until the dissolution of Austria-Hungary in 1918.

Improved relations of Croats and Serbs were a by-product of actions by the Progressive Youth members. Even though those relations were given less significance by Supilo and Trumbić, the HSK adopted the vaguely defined and variously interpreted Yugoslavist concept of national oneness. The term originated among the Progressive Youth and referred to the unity of the Croats and the Serbs.

Months after being sacked as the secretary of the HSP, Radić founded the Croatian People's Peasant Party (Croatian: Hrvatska pučka seljačka stranka, HPSS). The HPSS became the main political party of the Croats in the Kingdom of Yugoslavia during the interwar period.

== Sources ==
- Agičić, Damir (1998). "Hrvatski studenti na češkom sveučilištu u Pragu 1882.–1918. godine" [Croatian Students at the Czech University in Prague During 1882–1918 Period]. Časopis za suvremenu povijest (in Croatian). 30 (2). Zagreb: Croatian Institute of History: 291–314. ISSN 1848-9079.
- Banac, Ivo (1984). The National Question in Yugoslavia: Origins, History, Politics. Ithaca, New York: Cornell University Press. ISBN 0-8014-1675-2.
- Biondich, Mark (2000). Stjepan Radić, the Croat Peasant Party, and the Politics of Mass Mobilization, 1904–1928. Toronto: University of Toronto Press. ISBN 0-8020-4727-0.
- Gevers, Lieve; Vos, Louis (2004). "Social and National Emancipation (1885–1900)". In Rüegg, Walter (ed.). A History of the University in Europe: Volume 3, Universities in the Nineteenth and Early Twentieth Centuries (1800–1945). Cambridge University Press. pp. 315–324. ISBN 978-1-139-45302-8.
- Glenny, Misha (2012). The Balkans, 1804–2012: Nationalism, War and the Great Powers. Toronto: House of Anansi Press. ISBN 978-1-77089-273-6.
- Headlam, James Wycliffe (1911). "Austria-Hungary" . In Chisholm, Hugh (ed.). Encyclopædia Britannica. Vol. 3 (11th ed.). Cambridge University Press. pp. 2–39.
- Kamusella, Tomasz (2009). The Politics of Language and Nationalism in Modern Central Europe. Palgrave Macmillan. ISBN 978-1-349-36196-0.
- Kent, Sarah A. (2009). "State Ritual and Ritual Parody: Croatian Student Protest and the Limits of Loyalty at the End of the Nineteenth Century". In Cole, Laurence; Unowsky, Daniel (eds.). The Limits of Loyalty: Imperial Symbolism, Popular Allegiances, and State Patriotism in the Late Habsburg Monarchy. New York: Berghahn Books. pp. 162–177. ISBN 978-1-84545-202-5.
- Krizman, Bogdan (1972). "Osnivanje Hrvatske pučke seljačke stranke (1904–1905)" [Founding of the Croatian People’s Peasant Party (1904–1905)]. Radovi Zavoda za hrvatsku povijest Filozofskoga fakulteta Sveučilišta u Zagrebu (in Croatian). 2 (1). Zagreb: Faculty of Humanities and Social Sciences, University of Zagreb: 105–179. ISSN 1849-0344.
- Matić, Davorka (2007). "13: Is Nationalism Really That Bad? The Case of Croatia". In Matić, Davorka; Ramet, Sabrina P. (eds.). Democratic Transition in Croatia – Value Transformation, Education, and Media. College Station: Texas A&M University Press. ISBN 978-1-60344-452-1.
- Matković, Stjepan (1996). "Čista stranka prava i stranački izbori na prijelazu 19. u 20. stoljeće" [The Pure Party of Right and Parliamentary Elections at the Turn of the 19th Century]. Povijesni prilozi (in Croatian). 15 (15). Zagreb: Croatian Institute of History: 59–91. ISSN 1848-9087.
- Matković, Stjepan (1997). "Izbori za Hrvatski sabor 1897. godine: afirmacija Khuenove autokracije" [The Elections for Croatian Parliament in 1897: Affirmation of Khuen's Autocracy]. Časopis za suvremenu povijest (in Croatian). 29 (3). Zagreb: Croatian Institute of History: 469–488. ISSN 1848-9079.
- Mileta, Silvestar (2016). "Preteča komunističkog pokreta: socijalna demokracija u Hrvatskoj i Slavoniji 1890.-1914. i njena veza s građanskim opcijama napredne omladine i Hrvatske napredne stranke" [Forerunner of the Communist Movement: Social Democracy in Croatia and Slavonia in 1890–1914 and its Link to the Civic Options of the Progressive Youth and the Croatian Progressive Party]. Pro Tempore (in Croatian) (10–11). Zagreb: Faculty of Humanities and Social Sciences, University of Zagreb: 440–461. ISSN 1334-8302.
- Miller, Nicholas J. (2010). Between Nation and State: Serbian Politics in Croatia Before the First World War. University of Pittsburgh Press. ISBN 978-0-8229-7722-3.
- Pribić, Branka (1972). "Idejna strujanja u hrvatskoj kulturi od 1895. do 1903" [Ideological Trends in the Croatian Culture from 1895 to 1903]. Časopis za suvremenu povijest (in Croatian). 4 (1). Zagreb: Croatian Institute of History: 87–127. ISSN 1848-9079.
- Racko, Ljerka (1990). "Spaljivanje mađarske zastave 1895. godine u Zagrebu" [Hungarian Flag Burning in Zagreb in 1895]. Radovi Zavoda za hrvatsku povijest Filozofskoga fakulteta Sveučilišta u Zagrebu (in Croatian). 23 (1). Zagreb: Faculty of Humanities and Social Sciences, University of Zagreb: 233–246. ISSN 1849-0344.
- Tomasevich, Jozo (2001). War and Revolution in Yugoslavia, 1941–1945: Occupation and Collaboration. Stanford, California: Stanford University Press. ISBN 978-0-8047-0857-9.
- Tomašegović, Nikola (2018). "Jedinstvom protiv (ne)sloge: nacionalna koncepcija napredne omladine" [With Unity Against (Dis)harmony: the Progressive Youth’s Conception of the Nation]. Tragovi: časopis za srpske i hrvatske teme (in Croatian). 1 (1). Zagreb: Serb National Council: 166–190. ISSN 2718-3467.
- Tomašegović, Nikola (2019). "Prema intelektualnoj historiji hrvatskog modernističkog pokreta na prijelomu 19. i 20. stoljeća: stanje istraživanja i istraživački problem" [Towards an Intellectual History of the Croatian Modernist Movement at the Turn of the 20th Century: State of Research and Research Problems]. Radovi Zavoda za hrvatsku povijest Filozofskoga fakulteta Sveučilišta u Zagrebu (in Croatian). 51 (2). Zagreb: Faculty of Humanities and Social Sciences, University of Zagreb: 217–232. doi:10.17234/RadoviZHP.51.19. ISSN 1849-0344.
