= Gjuro Červar =

- Born: 21 November 1876; Červari, Habsburg Margraviate of Istria, Austria-Hungary (now Croatia)
- Died: 8 May 1954 (aged 77); Opatija, PR Croatia, FPR Yugoslavia (now Croatia)
- Education: University of Vienna
- Occupations: Politician, lawyer
- Relatives: Juraj Dobrila (uncle)

Gjuro Červar (21 November 1876 – 8 May 1954) was a Croatian and Yugoslavian politician and lawyer.

Gjuro or Đuro Červar studied law at the University of Zagreb until he was convicted for the burning of the Flag of Hungary at the occasion of the 1895 visit by Emperor Franz Joseph to Zagreb. He resumed the study, financially supported by his maternal uncle Bishop Juraj Dobrila, at the University of Vienna until graduation in 1900. He practiced law in Opatija since 1900. Two years later, Červar became the secretary of the Political Society for Croats and Slovenes in Istria, and he was elected a member of the Diet of Istria, representing the municipality of Volosko and Podgrad in 1909 until his resignation in 1911. During the World War I, Červar was detained by the Austro-Hungarian authorities, first in Ljubljana and then near Graz. After the war and the dissolution of Austria-Hungary, he returned to Opatija controlled by the Kingdom of Italy, but the Italian authorities expelled him to the newly established Kingdom of Serbs, Croats and Slovenes (later renamed Yugoslavia). He ran unsuccessfully for the National Assembly in the 1923 Kingdom of Serbs, Croats and Slovenes parliamentary election. In the interwar period, Červar practiced law in Sušak until 1941. Following the Axis powers invasion of Yugoslavia, Červar was arrested and detained in Isernia until 1943. After the World War II, he returned to Opatija and retired.

== Sources ==
- "Červar, Gjuro (Đuro)". Istrian Encyclopedia (in Croatian). Miroslav Krleža Institute of Lexicography.
