= 1918 protest in Zagreb =

Event in the Kingdom of Serbs, Croats and Slovenes

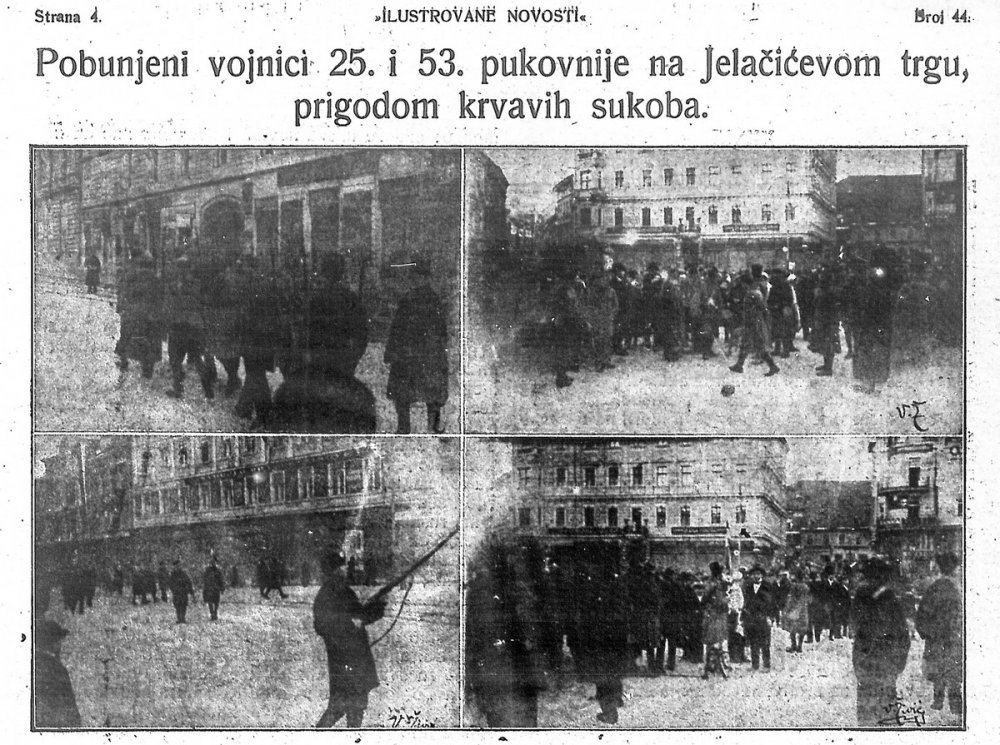
- Contemporary newspaper coverage
- Date: 5 December 1918
- Location: Zagreb, Kingdom of Serbs, Croats and Slovenes; 45°48′47″N 15°58′38″E
- Caused by: Method of unification of the State of Slovenes, Croats and Serbs with the Kingdom of Serbia or the unification itself
- Goals: Establishment of a republic
- Result: Protest suppressed

Parties
Parts of: 25th Regiment (Home Guard); 53rd Regiment (former Common Army)	National Guards of the State of Slovenes, Croats and Serbs; Sokol volunteers

Lead figures
Rudolf Sentmartoni	Budislav Grga Angjelinović; Lav Mazzura

Number
≈ 400	160

Casualties and losses
15 dead (incl. 2 civilians), 10 wounded	2 dead
- 1 Royal Serbian Army soldier killed

On 5 December 1918, four days after the proclamation of the Kingdom of Serbs, Croats and Slovenes, the National Guards (an armed force of the National Council of the State of Slovenes, Croats and Serbs) and Sokol volunteers suppressed a protest and engaged in an armed clash against the soldiers of the 25th Regiment of the Royal Croatian Home Guard and the 53rd Regiment of the former Austro-Hungarian Common Army. National Guardsmen stopped the soldiers at the Ban Jelačić Square in Zagreb.

Reasons for the protest and the conflict are not very well documented, but the soldiers who marched down Ilica Street from the Rudolf barracks towards the central city square shouted slogans against the King Peter I of Serbia and in support of republicanism and the Croatian People's Peasant Party leader Stjepan Radić. Once the soldiers reached the Ban Jelačić Square, brief negotiations took place, and then an armed clash afterwards. Most of the eighteen people killed in the clash were soldiers, and the dead protesters were dubbed the December Victims (Croatian: Prosinačke žrtve). Perceiving them unreliable, the National Council first disbanded the two regiments and later all former Austro-Hungarian units based in the new state. The National Council then relied on the Royal Serbian Army to establish units to replace the recently disbanded ones.

The Frankist faction of the Party of Rights used the event to portray creation of a common South Slavic kingdom and other events of 1918 as national humiliation claiming it fostered "culture of defeat" among Croats. The Frankists claimed that the "culture of defeat" was the result of a series of political failures and that the Frankists would give the disenchanted people and ignored former Austro-Hungarian officers a chance to redeem themselves for their defeats. Thus the "culture of defeat" contributed to the rise of Ustaše as far-right paramilitaries and later Nazi collaborators during the World War II occupation of Yugoslavia.

== Background ==
=== Collapse of Austria-Hungary and civil disorder ===
In the final days of the World War I, on 5–6 October 1918, political parties representing Croats, Slovenes, and Serbs living in Austria-Hungary organised the Zagreb-based National Council of Slovenes, Croats and Serbs to achieve independence from the empire. The National Council proclaimed the State of Slovenes, Croats and Serbs encompassing the Slovene Lands, Croatia-Slavonia, Dalmatia, and Bosnia and Herzegovina, and authorised the Yugoslav Committee, an interest group advocating unification of previously Habsburg South Slavic areas with the Kingdom of Serbia, to represent the council abroad. National Council president Anton Korošec left Zagreb for a conference in Geneva with Serbian representatives to discuss the method of unification.

At the time, Austro–Hungarian deserters termed Green Cadres were causing a crime wave in the countryside. By September 1918, there were about 50,000 Green Cadres among the Croats, Serbs, and Bosniaks. Most of them were active in Croatia-Slavonia, where violence peaked between 24 October and 4 November. The period also saw a mutiny in Požega. In nearby Orahovica, two Austro-Hungarian regiments, one Bohemian and one Dalmatian fought against each other. Officials in the town reported that some of the soldiers sided with the Bolsheviks. The violence quickly spread and elements of the 23rd Regiment and the 28th Regiment of the Royal Croatian Home Guard joined in looting Osijek. Mutineers also led looting in Petrovaradin, Pakrac, Daruvar, and Županja, although peasants and the (mostly peasant) Green Cadres were responsible for most of the pillaging and looting.

The National Council hesitated to condemn the violence, and its attempts to stop the looters by deploying ad-hoc, locally raised militia were ineffective since many militiamen were also looting. Therefore, the National Council relied on Serbian prisoners of war (captured by the Austro-Hungarian Army during the war), and sent a delegation to the Royal Serbian Army command on 5 November to request its troops to restore order in Croatia-Slavonia. The National Council, by then dominated by the Croat-Serb Coalition led by Svetozar Pribičević, blamed the unrest partly on Bolsheviks and the Croatian People's Peasant Party (HPSS) led by Stjepan Radić. The association of the HPSS with the popular discontent later helped propel the HPSS to the position of the most successful political party among the Croats in the interwar period. The peasants actively involved in the October–November unrest, misidentifying republicanism as the abolition of military service and taxes, cited it as their ultimate political objective.

=== Federation vs centralised union with Serbia ===
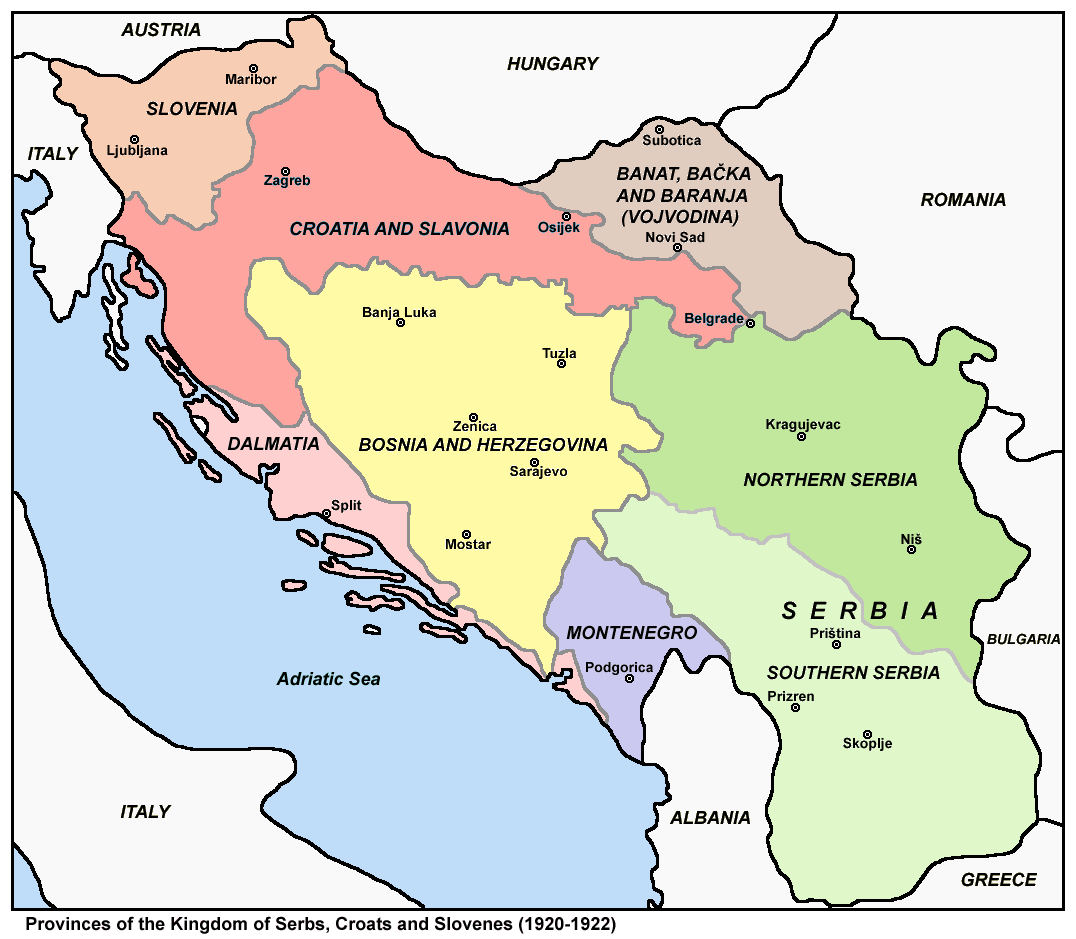
Map of lands forming the Kingdom of Serbs, Croats and Slovenes

There were two main approaches to the unification of the South Slavs. While Ante Trumbić's Yugoslav Committee advocated a federal system of government, the Prime Minister of Serbia Nikola Pašić wanted a centralised state. Pašić threatened to conquer and annex the Serb-inhabited territories of Austria-Hungary to create a Greater Serbia unless Trumbić accepted a centralised state. Under pressure from the Triple Entente, Pašić agreed to support a federal South Slavic state during the November 1918 conference in Geneva, but Serbia repudiated the agreement either because of Prince Regent Alexander's opposition, or in a scheme devised by Pašić to deflect Entente pressure and undermine Korošec's authority.

Shortly after the conclusion of the Geneva conference, the National Council announced it had thwarted an attempted coup d'état for which it arrested General of the Infantry Anton Lipošćak. The Italian Army seized Rijeka and approached Ljubljana. Without means to stop the Italian advance, the National Council feared that the Italian presence on the eastern shores of the Adriatic would become permanent. The National Council dispatched a delegation to Prince Regent Alexander to quickly arrange unification of Yugoslavia on a federal basis. The delegation ignored the National Council's instructions to demand constitutional safeguards when it addressed the Prince Regent on 1 December. The Prince Regent accepted the unification offer on behalf of Peter I of Serbia, and the Kingdom of Serbs, Croats and Slovenes was established without any agreement on the nature of the union.

=== Armed forces in Zagreb ===
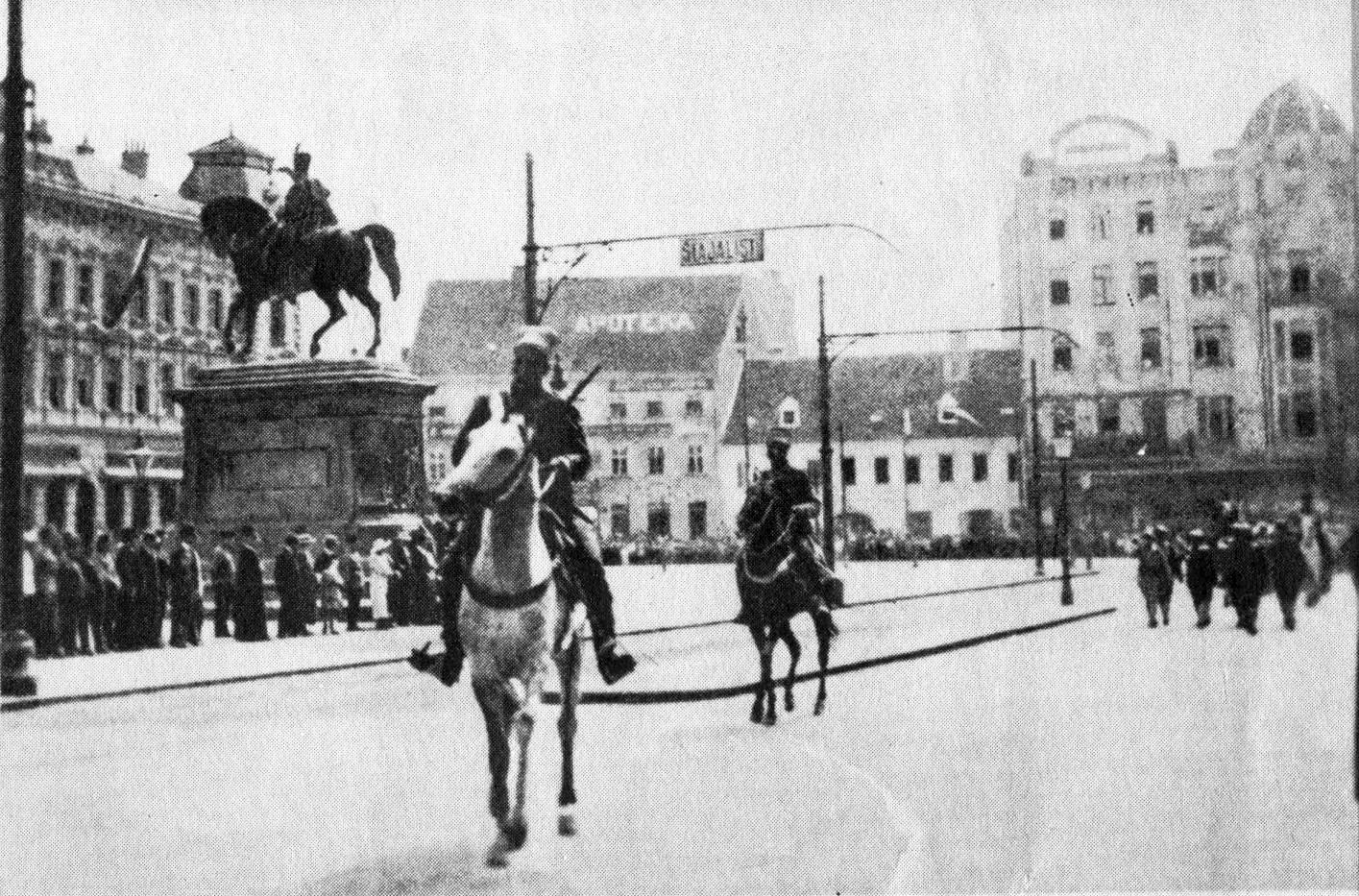
Photograph of a Royal Serbian Army unit arriving to the Ban Jelačić Square in Zagreb in late 1918.

The National Council established the National Guard on 27 October 1918 in preparation for the Croatian Sabor meeting that declared secession from Austria-Hungary two days later. The National Guard consisted of volunteers from university guard organisations and Croatian and Serb Sokol associations, subordinated to the Commission for Public Order and Security in Zagreb headed by Budislav Grga Angjelinović and directly commanded by Lav Mazzura. The force was augmented by a detachment of former Austro-Hungarian Navy sailors. Attempts to organise the National Guards in the countryside to combat civil disorder proved ineffective.

The State of Slovenes, Croats and Serbs formally established its military on 1 November, three days after the declaration of independence, from Austro-Hungarian units based in the territory of the new state. On 6 November, the 25th Regiment of the Royal Croatian Home Guard and the 53rd Regiment of the Common Army based in Zagreb swore an oath of allegiance to the National Council. The council deemed the soldiers returning from the war after that date also bound by the same oath. The 25th Regiment had just returned from fighting in to capture Međimurje on behalf of the National Council, and both regiments maintained security in Zagreb without incident. Nonetheless, many soldiers based in Zagreb supported a republic; republican ideas spread under the influence of Radić and returnees from Russia in the aftermath of the October Revolution. In early December 1918, the 25th Regiment commanded by Colonel Milivoj Kućak had 210 officers and 578 soldiers stationed in Zagreb barracks of the Royal Home Guard in the Ilica Street, while the 53rd Regiment had 442 troops stationed in the city, in the Rudolf barracks. The 53rd Regiment, commanded by Colonel Mirko Petrović, the 37th Field Artillery Regiment of the former Common Army, and the 6th Field Artillery Regiment of the Home Guard were also stationed in the city. The 37th Field Artillery Regiment had 22 officers and 142 soldiers, while the 6th Field Artillery Regiment had 46 officers and 21 soldiers in Zagreb. The National Council-established National Guard had about 500 armed members in Zagreb at the time, augmented by a 1254-strong regiment composed of former Serbian Army prisoners-of-war. In November, Lieutenant Colonel Dušan Simović was assigned to Zagreb as the envoy of the Serbian Army, and the 3rd Battalion of the 7th Regiment of the Serbian Army arrived in Zagreb by the end of the month.

== Prelude ==
Ban Jelačić Square (pictured in 1880) is the central square in Zagreb.

On 3 December, the National Council promulgated the Unification Act. In cooperation with Zagreb's local authorities, it sponsored several public celebrations of unification to match the mass celebrations of declaration of independence of the State of Slovenes, Croats and Serbs from Austria-Hungary from late October. According to historian Rudolf Horvat, the festivities were organised carelessly and some behaviour offended "everything held dear and sacred by the Croatian people". The same day, there were reports from the nearby town of Bjelovar that the army troops stationed there were mutinous after the unification was announced. A National Council representative in the town reported that the soldiers were shouting slogans against the King and cheering on republicanism. Kućak and Petrović informed the deputy defence commissioner of the National Council Nikola Winterhalter of the pro-republican mood in the troops stationed in Zagreb barracks.

Seizing on widespread disenchantment, the Frankists drew up and distributed a proclamation condemning the process of unification as undemocratic on 2 December. The party daily Hrvatska (Croatia) published it two days later, stating the Frankists would continue to advocate unification of free and independent states of Slovenes, Croats, and Serbs in a federal republic. In response, the authorities confiscated the issue and banned Hrvatska. The party distributed the manifest as a leaflet instead. In the morning of 5 December, Zagreb Cathedral held a Te Deum service as a part of celebration of establishment of the Kingdom of Serbs, Croats and Slovenes.

== Protest ==
=== From the barracks to Ban Jelačić Square ===
In the afternoon of 5 December, some soldiers of the 53rd Regiment left the Rudolf barracks in western Zagreb and set out towards Ban Jelačić Square. En route, they stopped before the Home Guard Barracks in Ilica Street where some soldiers of the 25th Regiment joined the march. Civilians also joined the soldiers. The soldiers brought rifles and two machine guns from each barracks and were accompanied by the twelve-strong military band of the 25th Regiment. The marchers intended to declare a free Croatian republic, spurred on by perceived provocative behaviour at celebrations of unification. The subsequent indictment for the act of mutiny specified 250 soldiers participating, but the actual number is likely to be about 400, 200 from each regiment.

Protesting the unification with Serbia, the soldiers walked down Ilica Street carrying a flag of Croatia and shouting "Long live the republic!", "Long live Radić!", "Down with King Peter!", "Down with the dynasty!", "Long live the peasant party!", "Down with militarism!", "Long live Croatian republic!", and "Long live Bolshevik republic!". Authorities later also reported that the demonstrators called out for release of General Lipošćak. According to Croatian historian Mislav Gabelica, it is unclear if the soldiers were protesting against the unification itself or the method by which it was carried out. Gabelica also argues that the protest was in part spurred on by various causes for discontent such as widespread poverty and anarchy in the country as well as by external actors such as by Italian intelligence services.

Most sources agree that the protesting soldiers reached Ban Jelačić Square at 2 p.m. Some troops loyal to the government were deployed at the end of Ilica to prevent people from entering the square, but they quickly gave way. Upon reaching the square, the soldiers of the 25th and the 53rd regiments set up two machine guns at the centre of the square, and two at the start of Ilica – near the Gajeva Street and Oktogon respectively. The military band took position at the square near the Duga Street (Radićeva Street today) and played Lijepa naša domovino.

=== Armed clash on the square ===
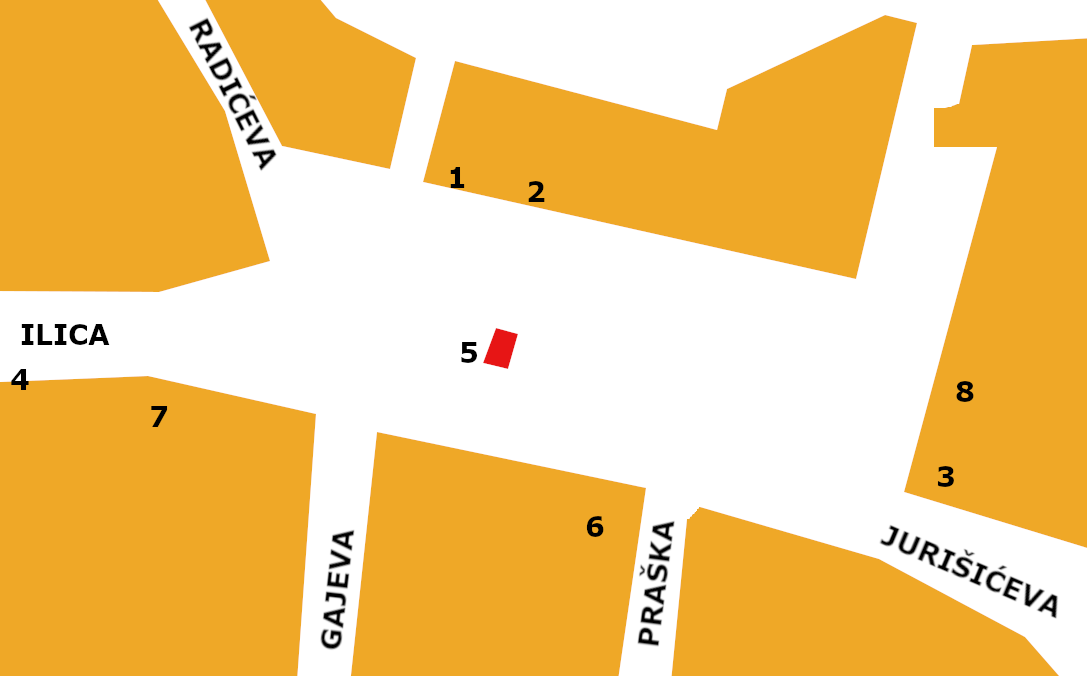
Sketch of approximate positions of machine guns at the Ban Jelačić Square in Zagreb on 5 December 1918: 1 - House Popović, 2 - House No. 6 (Rosia-Fonsier), 3 - House Feller, 4 - Oktogon, 5 - Jelačić monument; Erroneous reports: 6 - House No. 27, 7 - Foundation Hospital, 8 - House Gnezda

The authorities were informed about the planned protest at the latest at 11:30 a.m. on the day of the protest, and cleared the square of people before the soldiers arrived. Armed National Guardsmen and Sokol volunteers were waiting for the soldiers and civilians who joined the protest, taking cover in the surrounding buildings. According to contemporary government reports, 60 National Guardsmen were deployed on the north side of the square, in House Popović (then at number 4, the numbers have changed since) and at house number 6 – with a machine gun set up in each building. According to that report, 20 troops were at the House Popović, while the rest, together with Angjelinović, took up positions at the other building. According to the 1926 testimony of Sergeant Dragutin Mačuka, the government deployed 160 troops (National Guards and Sokol volunteers) to the square. The headquarters were set up in the house at number 6 with additional troops at the House Popović and the House Feller (at number 21, at the corner of the Jurišićeva Street) on the east side of the square. Mačuka's estimate of the government strength is supported by testimony of a Sokol volunteer, Branko Kojić, who said 60 Sokol volunteers and 100 National Guardsmen were deployed. First there were brief negotiations. According to witness statements, Kućak and Lieutenant Colonel Slavko Kvaternik went to House Popović and attempted to calm the situation down. According to Kvaternik, they persuaded Mazzura to tell the National Guardsmen in that house not to fire. Kvaternik's statement is contradicted by others who identified civilian Zdravko Lenac as commander of the National Guardsmen at the House Popović.

According to trial testimony, the soldiers of the 25th and the 53rd regiments captured House Popović and the machine gun placed there. Various testimonies disagreed as to whether the second machine gun was placed at a balcony of the adjacent house (number 5) or at the house number 6 (Note: The house at number 6 is also variously referred to using names of its contemporary owners as the House Rosia-Fonsier, or former owners as House Gavella.) as indicated in official contemporary reports. The witnesses agree that the soldiers left the House Popović to capture another machine gun, that a gunfight erupted inside that building, and the machine gun fired on soldiers in the square. A later inspection of bullet pockmarks left on facades revealed that the house number 6 was the main target of the soldiers' fire, and other testimonies placed Angjelinović in that house, commanding the machine gun crew to fire on the soldiers. Kvaternik and other witnesses indicated that a third machine gun fired from the House Feller and killed a soldier manning a machine gun set up by the mutineers at the foot of the Josip Jelačić monument on the square. In his 1947 testimony, Kvaternik said the National Guards had a machine gun on the south side of the square at the house number 27 at the corner of present-day Praška Street, but no other source supports that claim.

The skirmish ended at about 3 p.m. Most of the protesters scattered and fled, but some survivors were captured. Eighteen people died in the gunfight or of their wounds. The deaths included two National Guardsmen (both Sokol members), an unidentified Serbian soldier whom Simović says was not an active participant in the clash, and two civilians. On 7 December, Simović requested his superiors to deploy the rest of the 7th Infantry Regiment to Zagreb for security reasons. Military prosecutor's and forensic experts' reports of 6 December indicated 15 killed and 13 wounded. Three of the injured died of their wounds after the report was published. A subsequent trial identified Lance Corporal Rudolf Sentmartoni as the ringleader of the soldiers' protest, together with Sergeant Ivan Perčić, Corporal Martin Murk, an unnamed lance corporal in the 6th Field Artillery Regiment and an unidentified civilian. None of them were apprehended except Perčić, who was convicted for mutiny and sentenced to six years in prison. In 1941, Horvat wrote about the clash. Unlike other sources, Horvat stated that there were two machine guns – one firing from the roof of House Gnezda nextdoor to the House Feller and one from the top floor of a hospital (since replaced by 1 Ilica Street building). Reports on the direction of machine gun fire given by surviving soldiers contradict Horvat.

== Legacy ==
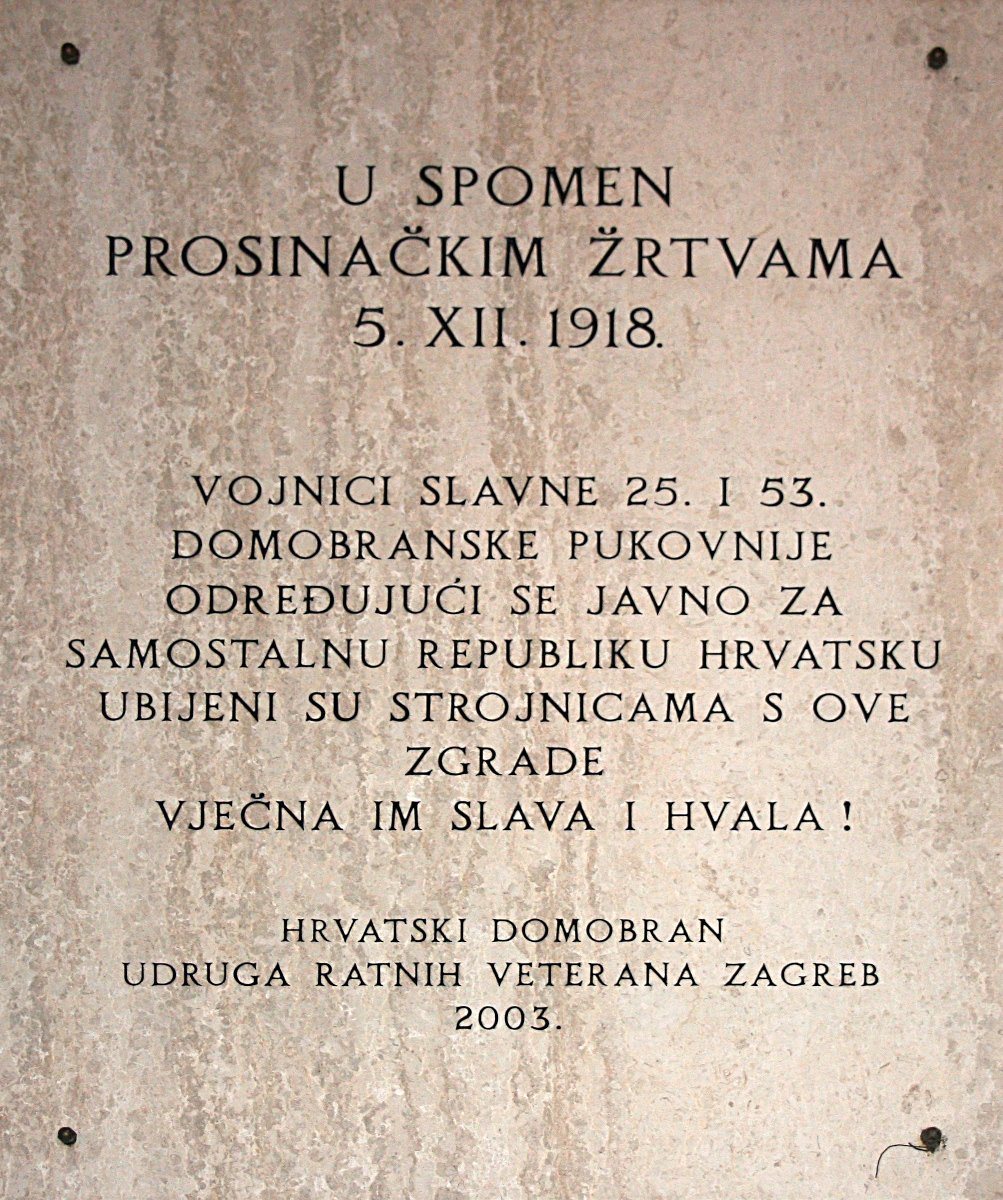
The commemorative plaque has been placed at the Ban Jelačić Square as a memorial in 2003.

Epitaph and list of the victims erected in 1934 at the Mirogoj cemetery.

The National Council disbanded the 25th and the 53rd regiments on the evening of 5 December, and cited the clash and the Lipošćak affair as grounds to restrict the inclusion of Croatian officers who previously served in the Austro-Hungarian armed forces in new army as unreliable. On 10 December, the National Council disbanded all armed units formally under its command including all former Croat units within the Austro-Hungarian Army and Navy. On 10 December, it authorised a Serbian Army mission to establish new units to replace the disbanded ones. The mission proceeded to establish new structures integrated with the rest of the new kingdom.

On 5 December, the National Council imposed censorship and banned the last remaining opposition newspaper, the HPSS-published Dom. The authorities also arrested Ivo Elegović and Vladimir Sachs-Petrović as the leaders of the pro-republican Frankist faction of the Party of Rights. The Frankists cited the events of 5 December as evidence of Croat refusal to form a common state with Serbia and portrayed the soldiers' revolt as vindication of Frankists' political opposition to the Kingdom of Serbs, Croats and Slovenes. The anniversary of the protest was commemorated by the opposition in dissent to the official celebrations of unification held every 1 December. The soldiers of the 25th and the 53rd regiments who died on the Ban Jelačić Square became referred to as the December Victims, and portrayed as martyrs for independence of Croatia. Attempting to capitalise on perceived widespread opposition to the new union, the Frankists went on to establish the émigré Croatian Committee with the aim of having free elections in Croatian lands, and emphasised that the Frankists are championing the cause for which the December Victims fell. The 5 December protest and killings contributed to the Frankists' efforts to develop a "Culture of Defeat" depicting the events of 1918 as a humiliation which must be avenged. This allowed the Frankist leaders in 1920s, notably Ante Pavelić, to offer disgruntled people and forgotten former Austro-Hungarian officers a chance to "redeem" themselves as far-right Ustaše paramilitaries (and later Nazi collaborators).

The two killed National Guardsmen were buried with honours at the Mirogoj Cemetery in Zagreb. In 1932, the Croatian Woman Society launched an initiative to transfer bodies of the killed soldiers and civilians (not the National Guardsmen) from their individual graves at the Mirogoj to a common crypt. The society built a monument to the killed at the cemetery, The Yugoslav state did not allow the transfer of remains, which was carried out in December 1941, after the establishment of the Ustaše-ruled Independent State of Croatia (NDH) as a Nazi puppet state during World War II. On 26 August 1941, Pavelić declared "600 revolutionaries" involved in the 5 December 1918 protest a Reserve Battalion of the Ustaše Militia, originally a ceremonial unit. The unit, commanded by Ivan Perečić, was subsequently renamed the Honor Battalion. The NDH wanted to portray the December Victims as a symbol of resistance to the union with Serbia, but Nazi Plenipotentiary-General to the NDH Edmund Glaise-Horstenau complained that the event was essentially a communist affair. In 1942, commemorative medals were authorised for participants of the protest and the right to wear them was awarded to 402 people (25 posthumously). In 1943, a monument was erected at the Ban Jelačić Square to commemorate the 25th anniversary of the protest. By 1947, Communist authorities removed all the monuments from the Ban Jelačić Square, including the equestrian monument to Josip Jelačić. A plaque was placed by Croatian World War II veterans association Hrvatski domobran on the former House Feller (now number 11) in 2003 to commemorate the 1918 protest.

== Sources ==
- Banac, Ivo (1984). The National Question in Yugoslavia: Origins, History, Politics. Ithaca: Cornell University Press. ISBN 0-8014-1675-2.
- Banac, Ivo (1992). "'Emperor Karl Has Become a Comitadji': The Croatian Disturbances of Autumn 1918". The Slavonic and East European Review. 70 (2). London: Modern Humanities Research Association: 284–305. ISSN 0037-6795. JSTOR 4210927.
- Beneš, Jakub S. (2017). "The Green Cadres and the Collapse of Austria-Hungary in 1918". Past & Present (236). Oxford: Oxford University Press: 207–241. doi:10.1093/pastj/gtx028. ISSN 0031-2746.
- Gabelica, Mislav (2005). "Žrtve sukoba na Jelačićevom trgu 5. prosinca 1918" [Victims of the Clash on Jelačić Square on December 5, 1918]. Časopis za suvremenu povijest (in Croatian). 37 (2). Zagreb: Croatian Institute of History: 467–477. ISSN 0590-9597.
- Gabelica, Mislav; Matković, Stjepan (2018). Petoprosinačka pobuna u Zagrebu 1918: prva vojna akcija protiv jugoslavenske države [Fifth of December Revolt in Zagreb in 1918: The First Military Action Against the Yugoslav State] (in Croatian). Zagreb: Naklada Pavičić P.I.P. ISBN 9789537949099.
- Geiger, Vladimir; Barić, Nikica (2002). "Odjeci i obilježavanja 5. prosinca 1918. u Nezavisnoj Državi Hrvatskoj" [Commemorations and Views About the December 5, 1918 Events During the Independent State of Croatia]. Časopis za suvremenu povijest (in Croatian). 34 (3). Zagreb: Croatian Institute of History: 833–850. ISSN 0590-9597.
- Huzjan, Vladimir (2005). "Raspuštanje Hrvatskog domobranstva nakon završetka Prvog svjetskog rata" [The Demobilization of the Croatian Home Guards After the End of the First World War]. Časopis za suvremenu povijest (in Croatian). 37 (2). Zagreb: Croatian Institute of History: 445–465. ISSN 0590-9597.
- Janković, Dragoslav (1964). "Ženevska konferencija o stvaranju jugoslovenske zajednice 1918. godine" [Geneva Conference on Creation of the Yugoslav Community in 1918]. Istorija XX veka [History of the 20th Century] (in Serbian). Vol. V. Belgrade: Institute of Legal History of the University of Belgrade Faculty of Law. pp. 225–262. OCLC 67000822.
- Martan, Željko (2016). "Nemiri u Hrvatskoj od proglašenja Države Slovenaca, Hrvata i Srba do Prosinačkih žrtava" [Riots in Croatia from the declaration of the State of Slovens, Croats and Serbs to the December victims]. Povijest U Nastavi (in Croatian). 14 (27). Zagreb: Društvo za hrvatsku povjesnicu: 1–30. ISSN 1334-1375.
- Mataušić, Nataša (2001). "A gdje je spomenik banu?" [Where Is the Ban's Monument?]. Informatica Museologica (in Croatian). 32 (1–2). Zagreb: Museum Documentation Centre: 127–129. ISSN 0350-2325.
- Matijević, Zlatko (2008a). "The National Council of Slovenes, Croats and Serbs in Zagreb (1918/1919)". Review of Croatian History. 4 (1). Zagreb: Hrvatski institut za povijest: 51–84. ISSN 1845-4380.
- Matijević, Zlatko (2008b). "Stranka prava (frankovci) u doba vladavine Narodnoga vijeća Slovenaca, Hrvata i Srba (listopad – prosinac 1918.)" [The Party of Right (Frankists) During the Rule of the National Council of the Slovenes, Croats, and Serbs (October–December 1918)]. Časopis za suvremenu povijest (in Croatian). 40 (3). Zagreb: Croatian Institute of History: 1105–1118. ISSN 0590-9597.
- Newman, John Paul (2015). Yugoslavia in the Shadow of War: Veterans and the Limits of State Building, 1903–1945. Cambridge: Cambridge University Press. ISBN 9781107070769.
- Newman, John Paul (2018). "Shades of Empire: Austro-Hungarian Officers, Frankists, and the Afterlives of Austria-Hungary in Croatia, 1918–1929". In Miller, Paul; Morelon, Claire (eds.). Embers of Empire: Continuity and Rupture in the Habsburg Successor States after 1918. New York: Berghahn Books. pp. 157–176. ISBN 9781789200232.
- Pavlović, Vojislav G (2019). "Italy and the Creation of Yugoslavia. Delenda Austria?". In Pavlović, Vojislav G. (ed.). Serbia and Italy in the Great War. Belgrade: Institute for Balkan Studies. pp. 245–278. ISBN 9788671791038.
- Pavlowitch, Kosta St. (2003). "The First World War and Unification of Yugoslavia". In Djokic, Dejan (ed.). Yugoslavism: Histories of a Failed Idea, 1918–1992. London: C. Hurst & Co. pp. 27–41. ISBN 1-85065-663-0.
- Plančić, Nikola (26 September 2003). "Otkrivena spomen ploča "prosinačkim žrtvama"" [Commemorative Plaque to December Victims Unveiled]. Nacional (in Croatian). ISSN 1330-9048. Archived from the original on 11 October 2021.
- Ramet, Sabrina P. (2006). The Three Yugoslavias: State-building and Legitimation, 1918–2005. Bloomington: Indiana University Press. ISBN 9780253346568.
- Šepić, Dragovan (1968). "The Question of Yugoslav Union in 1918". Journal of Contemporary History. 3 (4). SAGE Publishing: 29–43. doi:10.1177/002200946800300403. ISSN 0022-0094. JSTOR 259849. S2CID 159110607.
- Štambuk-Škalić, Marina; Matijević, Zlatko, eds. (2008). "Narodno vijeće Slovenaca, Hrvata i Srba u Zagrebu 1918–1919. (izabrani dokumenti)" [National Council of Slovenes, Croats and Serbs in Zagreb 1918–1919 (Selected Documents)]. Fontes: Izvori Za Hrvatsku Povijest (in Croatian). 14 (1). Zagreb: Croatian State Archives: 71–596. ISSN 1330-6804.
- Zorko, Tomislav (2003). "Afera Lipošćak" [The Lipošćak Affair]. Časopis za suvremenu povijest (in Croatian). 35 (3). Zagreb: Croatian Institute of History: 887–902. ISSN 0590-9597.
