= Črnomerec =

District in Zagreb, Croatia

Coordinates: 45°49′57.11″N 15°56′17.91″E

- District
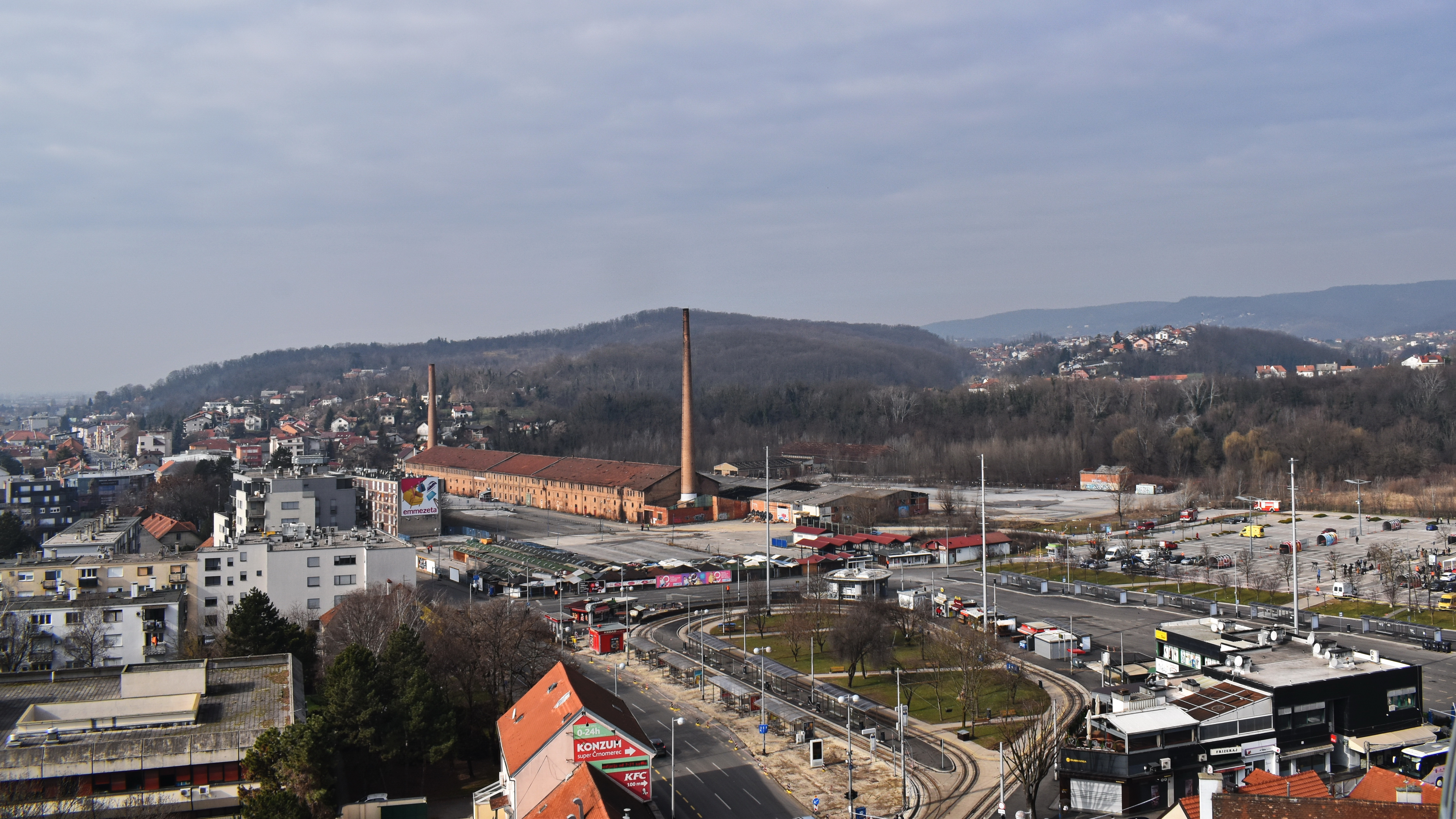
- Aerial view of Črnomerec

- Country: Croatia
- City: Zagreb

Government
  - Council president: Sven Turk (HDZ)

Area
  - Total: 24.33 km^{2} (9.39 sq mi)

Population
  - Total: 38,546
  - Density: 1,593.4/km^{2} (4,127/sq mi)

Črnomerec (Croatian pronunciation: [t͡ʃrnoměːret͡s]) is one of the city districts of Zagreb, Croatia. It is located in the western part of the city and has nearly 40,000 inhabitants.

== History ==
Archeological findings from Donja Kustošija show evidence of early Stone Age settlements in this area, some 35,000 years ago. There are even more artifacts from Roman period, including Roman road from mountain Medvednica to river Sava via this area.

Črnomerec was first mentioned as Village Černomerci near Chapel of Holy Spirit in the 14th century, as the biggest village near city (of Zagreb). This ancient Chapel of Holy Spirit was abandoned after Jesuit order was dismissed (1773). It was destroyed in 1810 when lightning struck hit it while used as ammunition depot for nearby army barracks.

For centuries the Črnomerec Stream was border of Zagreb city area, with malta (toll gate) in it. All vehicles entering the city area were due to pay maltarina, as well as peasants bringing their produce to be sold at city's markets. Local legend says that the district's name derives from toll officers that were clad in black (črno means black, and merec person that measures).

Črnomerec city district covers much wider area than the former village, incorporating also old urbanized villages of Vrhovec, Jelenovac, Kustošija, Fraterščica, Čukovići, and others. Positioned on the very end of historic Zagreb, according to urban regulation plans from 1865, 1887 and 1919 Črnomerec was meant to serve as industrial and army part of the city. Therefore, number of factories and army barracks were built there, together with substandard suburban housing.

== Economy and public affairs ==
The following factories are positioned in Črnomerec:

- Pliva pharmaceutical industry (owned by Teva)
- Zagrebačka pivovara brewery (owned by CVC Capital Partners)
- Franck coffee and snacks industry
- Ciglana Zagreb brick factory, including open pit mine
- Kamensko textile industry

Croatian Ministry of Environmental Protection, Physical Planning and Construction and Ministry of Interior have seats in Črnomerec.

== Buildings and monuments ==
Building sites in Črnomerec

The new chapel was built on the place of ancient Chapel of Saint Spirit in 1832, as well as Church of Saint Anthony of Padua with monastery.

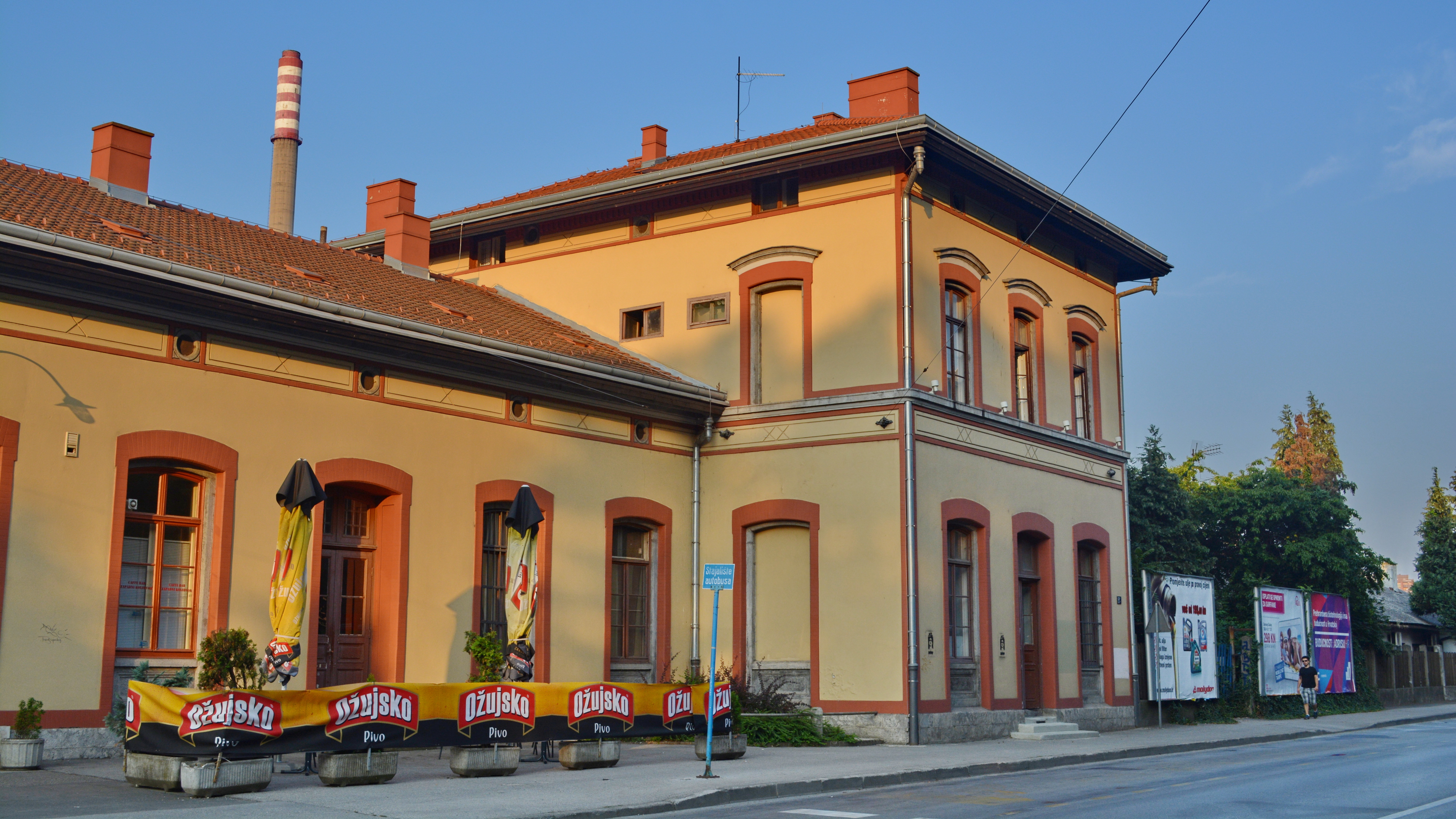
West Railway Station, Zagreb, Croatia

The first railway station in Zagreb, initially called South Station, than Sava Station, now West Railway Station (Croatian: Zapadni kolodvor) was built in 1862.

In the area of Sisters of Charity Hospital in Vinogradska Street there is the Chapel of Sacred Heart, built in 1896.

Wealthy Pongratz family built in Mikulići a unique summer house in Romanesque Revival style in 1868.

Medvedgrad ('Bear-Town'), medieval fortified town is located on the south slopes of Medvednica mountain, approximately halfway to the mountain top Sljeme.

From end of the 19th century Črnomerec was the main location for army barracks in Zagreb: Domobranska, Vozarska, Bataljunska, Topnička, Rudolfova. Although still standing, most all of them eventually got another functions - as factories, schools, ministries, courts. The most famous, Rudolf barracks (Croatian: Rudolfova vojarna), built in 1888, is today under protection as monument of architecture.

In 2006 Zagreb City Council decided that, on the newly named Franjo Tuđman Square, a monumental statue of the first Croatian president will be erected. As of 2025, this has not happened yet.

In 2010, a mass grave from World War II was discovered near the settlement of Gornja Kustošija. Exhumations of the mass grave began in February 2011, thus far revealing the remains of nine victims.

== List of neighborhoods ==
- Bijenik
- Čukovići
- Dedići
- Filipović Drive (former commune "Bartol Kašić")
- Fraterščica
- French Republic Square (former commune "Ban Keglević")
- Gornja Kustošija
- Gornje Selo
- Gornji Lukšić
- Jelenovac
- Kustošija
- Lukšić
- Mikulići
- Sveti Duh
- Šestinski dol
- Šestinski vrh
- Vrhovec
