= Basilica of Saint Anthony of Padua, Zagreb =

Basilica of Saint Anthony of Padua
- Bazilika svetog Antuna Padovanskog
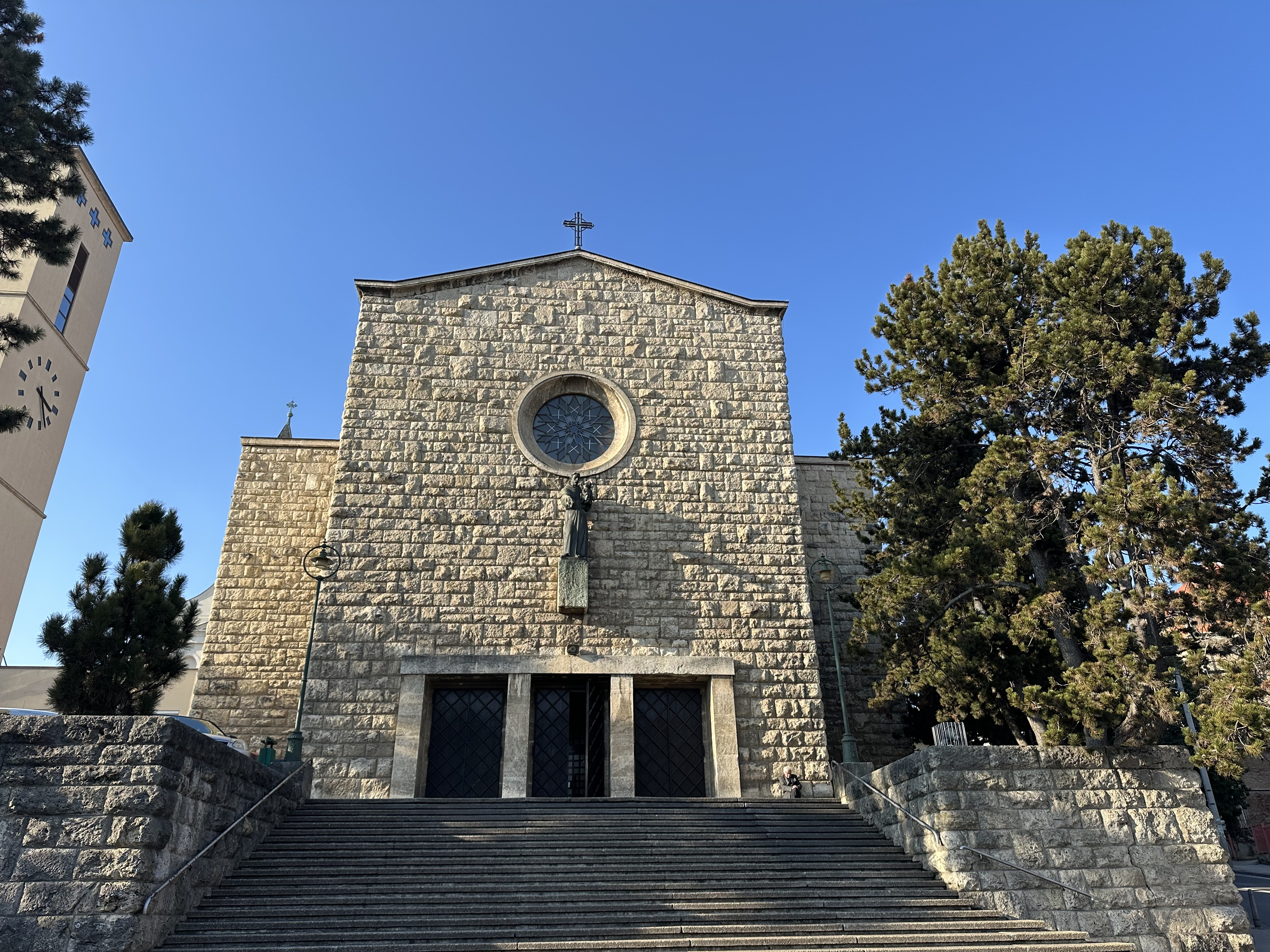
- Exterior
- Basilica of Saint Anthony of Padua
- 45.8162°N 15.9415°E
- Location: Črnomerec, Zagreb
- Address: Sveti Duh 31
- Country: Croatia
- Denomination: Catholic Church
- Religious institute: Friars Conventuals
- Website: www.sv-antun.hr

History
- Status: minor basilica
- Founded: 1931
- Dedication: Saint Anthony of Padua
- Dedicated: 24 November 1984
- Consecrated: 8 December 1934

Architecture
- Architect: Juraj Denzler
- Style: basilical-monumental
- Years built: 1931–1934

Specifications
- Length: 45 m (148 ft)
- Width: 25 m (82 ft)
- Height: 18 m (59 ft)

Administration
- Metropolis: Zagreb
- Archdiocese: Zagreb
- Parish: St. Anthony of Padua

Clergy
- Rector: Ivan Marija Lotar

Basilica of Saint Anthony of Padua (Croatian: Bazilika svetog Antuna Padovanskog) is a minor basilica, sanctuary, Catholic parish church and monastery of the Friars Conventuals in Zagreb, Croatia. It is located in the Sveti Duh ('Holy Spirit') neighbourhood of the Črnomerec district.

== History ==
St. Anthony parish was established on January 1, 1932. Construction of the church started in 1931, the year of 700th anniversary of St. Anthony's death, and was finished in 1934.

Church was consecrated on December 8, 1934 by archbishop Antun Bauer and Alojzije Stepinac served first Holy Mass inside on the same day. Stepinac consecrated main altar on September 12, 1943. Stepinac also presided over the Holy Mass on June 13, 1946, as part of the celebration of the proclamation of St. Anthony of Padua as a "teacher of the Gospel". Church's interior was completed in 1984. The church was dedicated by Cardinal Franjo Kuharić on November 24, 1984.

The church interior was renovated in 2007. In 2008, the bell tower, which was planned in the original plans, was built. Three new bells were placed in the bell tower and blessed in 2009. On the feast of the Immaculate Conception, December 8, 2009, Cardinal Josip Bozanić led the celebration of the 75th anniversary of the blessing and the 25th anniversary of the consecration of the parish church.

On November 24, 2017, bishop of Požega Antun Škvorčević blessed the altar fresco of St. Anthony with the Child Jesus, the work of Tihomir Lončar; on the same day, at the entrance to the church, busts of the blessed Alojzije Stepinac and Cardinal Franjo Kuharić, the work of Vid Vučak, were placed on stone blocks donated from the Zagreb Cathedral.

The church was elevated to the honor of a minor basilica by a decree of the Dicastery for Divine Worship on August 8, 2022. Cardinal Josip Bozanić handed over the Decree on the Proclamation of a Basilica (De Titulo Basilicae Minoris) to the Provincial, Fr. Miljenko Hontić, on September 16, 2022, and it was solemnly declared a basilica with a Eucharistic celebration on December 8 of the same year, presided over by Cardinal Josip Bozanić.

By the decree of the archbishop Dražen Kutleša, basilica is one of the holy places of the 2025 Jubilee.

== Architecture ==
The church was built by the design of architect Juraj Denzler. It was conceived as a three-nave basilica monumental church, a combination of the basilica style and the modern wave in architecture. The church is over 18 meters high, 25 meters wide, and 45 meters long.

=== Exterior ===
The exterior is built of rough stone. A rose window stands above the triple oak doors, and on the outside of the side naves there are rows of rectangular windows. Two windows located in the presbytery on either side are decorated with stained glass: the left one with St. Anthony blessing a child, and the right one with St. Anthony and the Child Jesus in his arms. On the facade of the church, under the rose window, is a bronze statue of St. Anthony, work by Kruno Bošnjak.

The side naves are one meter lower than the central one and are separated from it by rows of columns that are 14 meters high. The sanctuary is rectangular in shape. The presbytery of the church is one meter higher than the nave, emphasizing the central part of the basilica. The original design was made by engineer Vladimir Potočnjak, later modified by architect Bernard Bernardi.

=== Interior ===
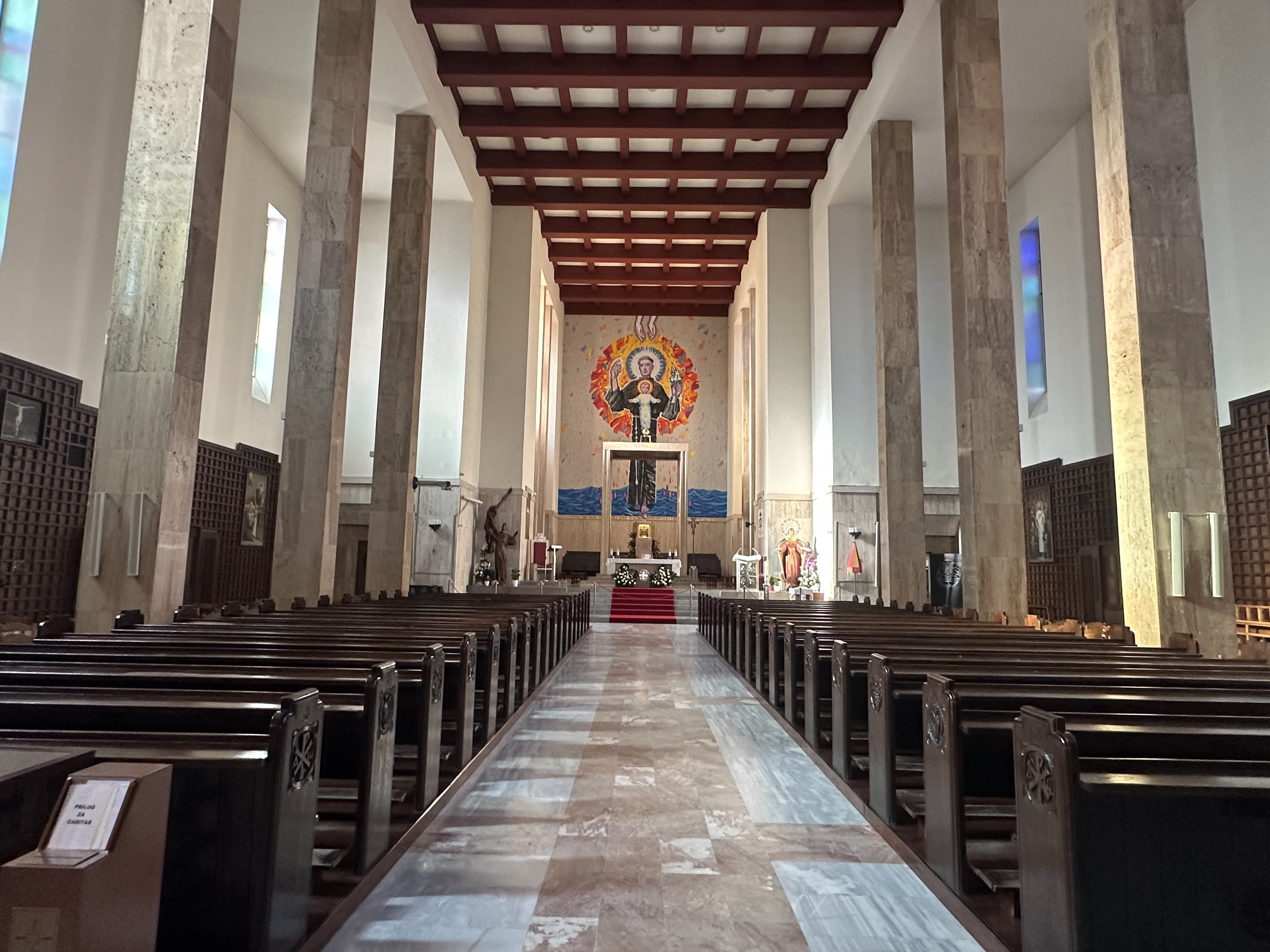
Interior

The gilded doors on the tabernacle were made by the sculptor Kosta Angeli Radovani. This space is covered with a canopy – a ciborium, supported by five meter–high columns. The inner surface of the cover is decorated with a mosaic of ancient Christian symbols. The benches and confessionals are made of oak and were installed in the church at the end of 1941. There are 36 benches in total, according to the years of St. Anthony. The reliefs with Christian symbols on the benches are the work of sculptor Radoje Hudoklin, who also decorated the four confessionals with reliefs. Sculptor Vladimir Radas made statues of the Crucified Christ and the Immaculate Virgin Mary.

The side naves are covered with wooden coffered drapery 5 meters high, decorated with the Stations of the Cross. The Way of the Cross was painted by Vasilije Jordan. In the places of the former side altars, paintings by Tihomir Lončar have been installed, which depict: the Heart of Jesus, St. Nikola Tavelić and St. Leopold Mandić with the Risen Christ, St. Maximilian Kolbe, and the Holy Family. In the vestibule of the church is a statue of Jesus under the burden of the cross by Juraj Škarpa, who also made two reliefs of St. Anthony, placed inside of the middle entrance.

== Literature ==
- Maračić, Ljudevit Anton (2021). Konventualni franjevci u Hrvata. Arhivski prinosi i pabirci. Zagreb: Kršćanska sadašnjost – Hrvatska provincija sv. Jeronima franjevaca konventualaca.
