= Budislav Grga Angjelinović =

Politician in Croatia-Slavonia and Dalmatia and Yugoslavia

- Born: 14 January 1886; Sućuraj, Kingdom of Dalmatia, Austria-Hungary (now Croatia)
- Died: 1 May 1946 (aged 60); Split, Yugoslavia (now Croatia)
- Education: University of Zagreb; Charles University; University of Lviv
- Occupation: Politician
- Political party: Democratic Party (1919–1928); Yugoslav National Party (from 1929)

Budislav Grga Angjelinović (14 January 1886 – 1 May 1946) was a politician and lawyer born in Sućuraj on the island of Hvar. He studied law at the Zagreb University, the Charles University in Prague, and at the University of Lviv. In the pre-World War I period, Angjelinović promoted positions held by the Party of Rights in the Mlada Hrvatska ("Young Croatia") journal he launched, and the Hrvatska kruna ("Croatian Crown") and the Hrvatska država ("Croatian State") he edited. He was among the organisers and members of the National Council of Slovenes, Croats and Serbs – a body composed of political representatives of the South Slavs living in Austria-Hungary tasked with achieving independence of South Slavic lands from the empire. Angjelinović was appointed the National Council's commissioner for public security in Zagreb in October 1918. In this role, he was tasked with suppressing the 1918 protest in Zagreb led by soldiers of the 25th Royal Croatian Home Guard and the 53rd (former) Common Army regiments. In 1919, he became a member of the newly established Democratic Party and shortly afterwards a member of the Organization of Yugoslav Nationalists. He was appointed a minister in the Government of the Kingdom of Serbs, Croats and Slovenes led by Anton Korošec in 1928–1929. Angjelinović was among the founders of the Yugoslav National Party in 1929 and appointed ambassador of Yugoslavia to Czechoslovakia and Austria during the 6 January Dictatorship. He held several Yugoslav government ministerial positions in 1932–1934 before becoming a senator. Angjelinović left the country in 1941 and returned only after the end of the World War II. He died in Split in 1946.
