= Lav Mazzura =

Politician and lawyer in Croatia-Slavonia and Yugoslavia

- Born: 7 January 1876; Zagreb, Kingdom of Croatia-Slavonia, Austria-Hungary (now Croatia)
- Died: 28 March 1930 (aged 54); Zagreb, Kingdom of Yugoslavia
- Education: University of Zagreb; Charles University
- Occupations: Politician, lawyer
- Political party: Croat-Serb Coalition (until 1919)

Lav Mazzura (7 January 1876 – 28 March 1930) was a politician and lawyer born in Zagreb. After studying law in Zagreb and Prague, he became one of leaders of the Progressive Youth. He was the editor of the Hrvatski pokret ("Croatian Movement") and the Hrvatska misao ("Croatian Thought") journals. In 1910–1913, Mazzura was a member of the Sabor of the Kingdom of Croatia-Slavonia as a member of the Croat-Serb Coalition led by Frano Supilo and Svetozar Pribičević. He was also a member of the joint Hungarian-Croatian Parliament in Budapest (as Croatia-Slavonia was a part of the Lands of the Crown of Saint Stephen). In November–December 1918, Mazzura was in command of Zagreb-based forces assigned to the Commission for Public Order and Security of the National Council of Slovenes, Croats and Serbs – a body composed of political representatives of the South Slavs living in Austria-Hungary tasked with achieving independence of South Slavic lands from the empire. According to testimony of Slavko Kvaternik, Mazzura was involved in unsuccessful negotiations to peacefully resolve a standoff during the 1918 protest in Zagreb. In 1919, Mazzura was appointed to the post of the prosecutor for the city of Zagreb. He died in Zagreb in 1930.
