= Rudolf barracks =

Army barracks site in Zagreb, Croatia

Coordinates: 45°48′40″N 15°57′26″E

Rudolf barracks (Croatian: Rudolfova vojarna) is historic army barracks site in Zagreb, Croatia, today serving as head office for Ministry of Construction, Spatial Planning and State Property.

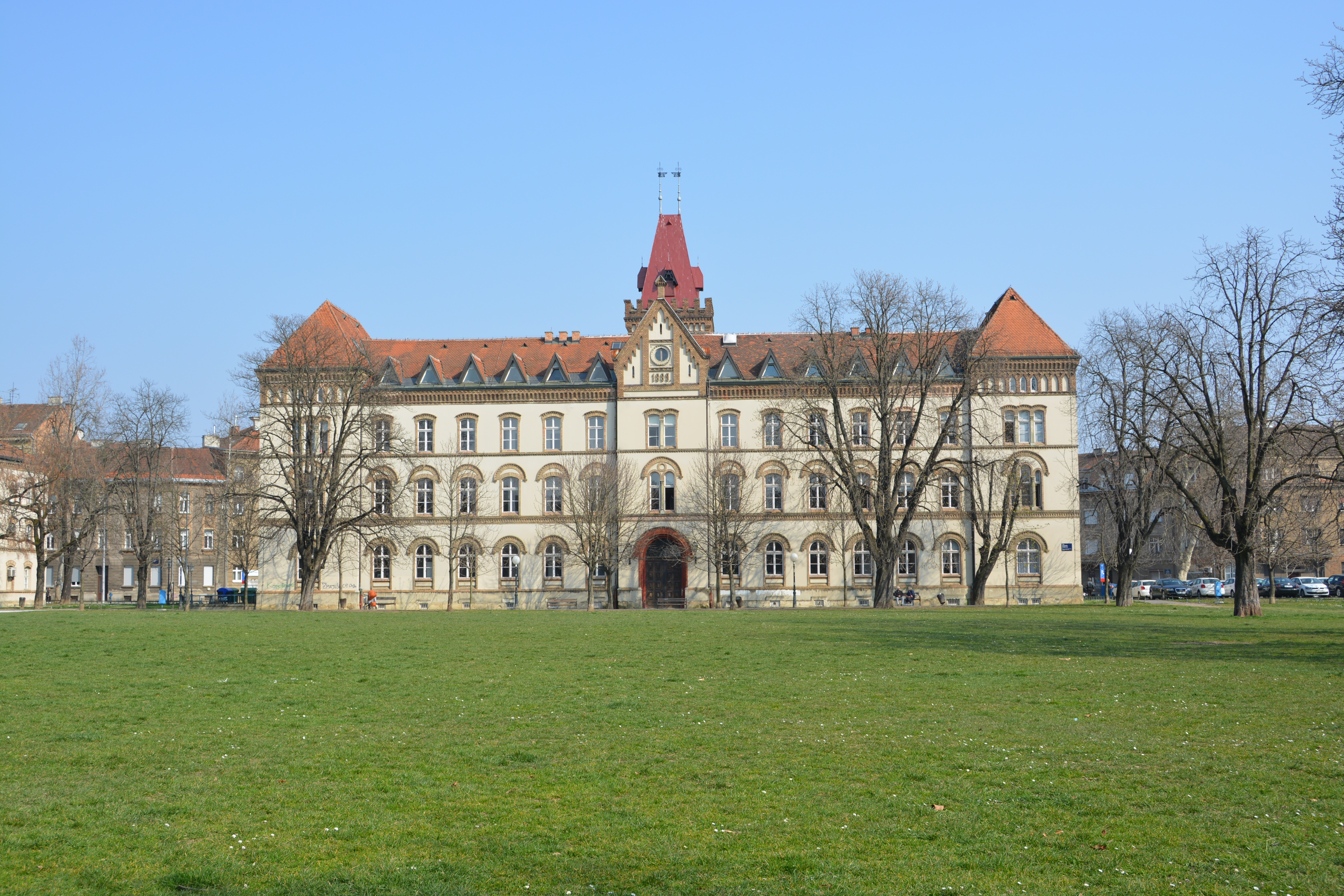
Rudolf Barracks main building

Barracks were built at the outskirts of contemporary Zagreb in 1888/1889, the same time as number of army barracks in the western part of Zagreb during Khuen Hedervary's rule in Croatia. It was named in honor of crown prince Rudolf of Austria who opened construction works in 1888.

The complex was built as infantry barracks at the end of newly constructed Prilaz Avenue, effectively blocking further communication from city center towards Črnomerec, but its main building gave a monumental ending to Prilaz, similar to the way Zagreb Glavni railway station gave a monumental ending to three parks in center of the city.

During history barracks were also called Zrinski barracks between World War I and World War II, and Marshal Tito barracks after World War II.

Today only the main building and four auxiliary buildings are preserved, homing Croatian Ministry of Environmental Protection, Physical Planning and Construction, Tourism institute, Zagreb city planning department and Črnomerec district council. Main building is under protection as monument of architecture. After demolition of most of buildings and all walls surrounding the military complex in 1978, there was plan to build commercial and cultural center (1981) but the area eventually spontaneously became public park. The park with buildings didn't have a name until 2006 when a part of it was named Franjo Tuđman Square, the other part of it was named very long time before Trg Francuske Republike (Place de la République française), because of an old story about Madame du Barry.

== See also ==
- Črnomerec
