= Istrian Encyclopedia =

Croatian specialty encyclopedia covering the Istrian region

- Internet logo
- Language: Croatian
- Genre: Encyclopedia
- Publisher: Lexicographic Institute
- Publication date: 2005
- Publication place: Croatia
- Media type: Print
- ISBN: 9536036835

The Istrian Encyclopedia (Croatian: Istarska enciklopedija) is a Croatian encyclopedia giving a complete overview of the Istrian peninsula and its history. Istria was the first region in Croatia to get its own encyclopedia. Published by the Lexicographic Institute, it was released in 2005. The editors-in-chief are Miroslav Bertoša and Robert Matijašić.

Over 1500 entries from the Istrian Encyclopedia were transferred to the online encyclopedia Istrapedia.

== Contents ==
The Istrian encyclopedia contains 3094 articles and 1410 photographs, maps, charts and tables.

The Istrian Encyclopedia contains articles on general and geographical characteristics and concepts relating to Istria; on institutions and people who have left their mark on Istrian culture.
