= Milan Marjanović =

Croatian writer (1879–1955)

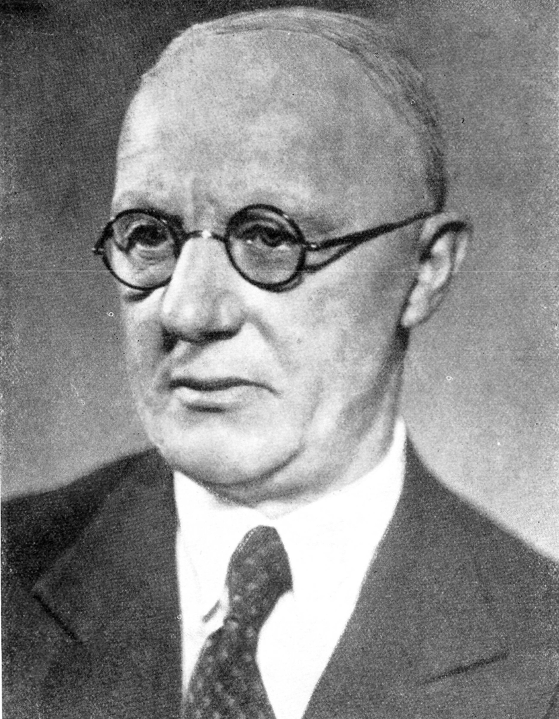
- Born: 12 May 1879; Kastav, Austrian Littoral, Austria-Hungary
- Died: 21 December 1955 (aged 76); Zagreb, PR Croatia, Yugoslavia
- Occupations: Writer, filmmaker
- Relatives: Branko Marjanović (son)

Milan Marjanović (12 May 1879 – 21 December 1955) was a Croatian and Yugoslavian writer, literary critic and filmmaker. He joined the Progressive Youth, part of the Croat-Serb Coalition, and by 1903, became one of its leading members. In 1912, he broke with the organisation and joined the Yugoslav Nationalist Youth, viewing integral Yugoslavism as the only way to politically unite the South Slavs. After the outbreak of World War I, he fled to Paris where he joined the Yugoslav Committee and worked at the mission of the Kingdom of Serbs, Croats and Slovenes (later renamed Yugoslavia) at the Paris Peace Conference. In the Interwar Period, Marjanović travelled to the United States, organising exhibitions of works of sculptor Ivan Meštrović and attending a course in photography and film directing in New York. He returned to Zagreb, then moved to Belgrade until retirement. During the World War II, he was arrested and imprisoned by Fascist Italy in 1942–1943. In 1944, he joined the Yugoslav Partisans' mission in Bari. He became a full member of the Yugoslav Academy of Sciences and Arts.

Marjanović influenced the ideology of Yugoslav nationalism and the Yugoslav Nationalist Youth. He introduced the idea of a unified Serbo-Croatian nation. Marjanović claimed that the Ottoman conquests in Europe both destroyed medieval South Slavic kingdoms and stopped ethnogenesis of separate South Slavic nations. The same ideology was subsequently adopted by the pro-regime Organization of Yugoslav Nationalists founded shortly after establishment of Yugoslavia.

By 1914, Marjanović had published more than 400 literary reviews. A significant portion of Marjanović's writing dealt with the works of Silvije Strahimir Kranjčević, Ante Kovačić, and Vladimir Nazor. Marjanović published a literary review deemed the first history of literary realism in Croatian literature. He also wrote plays, a novel and a series of political and literary-culture articles. He also published a series of works on occult topics and history, including the Adriatic question. Marjanović wrote screenplays and directed documentary films and an early Croatian animated film.

== Biography ==
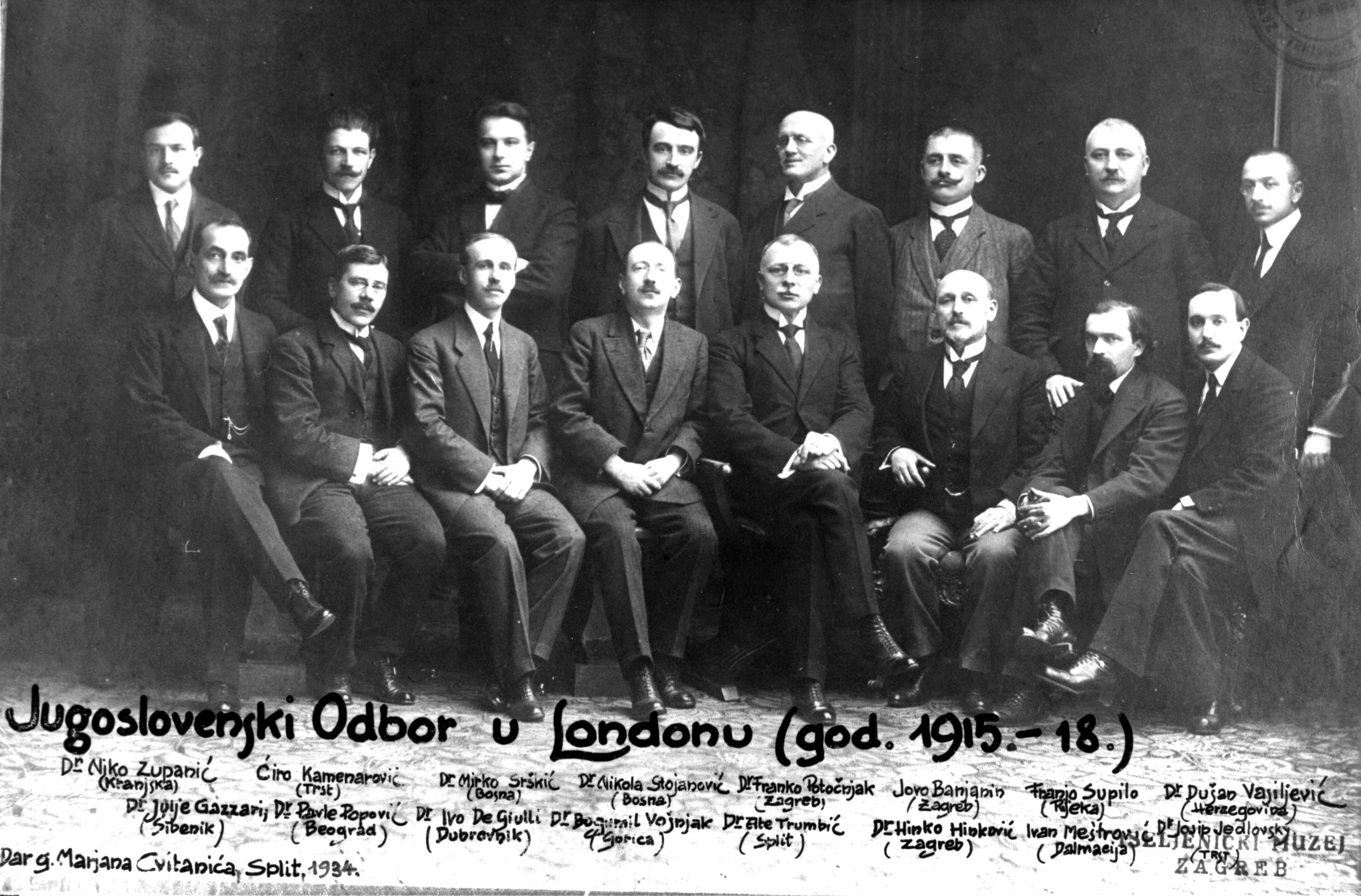
Yugoslav Committee photographed in Paris in 1916

Milan Marjanović, born in Kastav on 12 May 1879, attended high school in Karlovac from 1894 until 1896 when he was expelled for taking part in an anti-Hungarian protest in Karlovac. He continued his education in Sušak and at the Classical Gymnasium in Zagreb. In 1898–1899, he studied at the Trade Academy in Prague. Marjanović joined the Croat-Serb Progressive Youth, part of the Croat-Serb Coalition, and became one of its leading members by 1903. That year, he became a member the Party of Rights until 1904 when he helped to found the Croatian People's Progressive Party as party secretary. During the Croatian National Movement of 1903, Marjanović printed and distributed the so-called Basel Manifestos urging the population of Croatia-Slavonia to resist magyarisation policies of the Ban of Croatia Károly Khuen-Héderváry. Marjanović spoke at the Zagreb Assembly held in protest against Khuen-Héderváry on 11 March 1903, calling on those present to use peaceful means until those are exhausted, then, if necessary, force.

Marjanović edited several magazines and newspapers. In 1904, urged by Frano Supilo, Marjanović left his editorial position at the Crvena Hrvatska for that of editor at the Novi list. In 1908–1909, during the Agram Trial, he organised and ran an information service for the international press. In 1910, as editor of Sloboda and Pučka sloboda (published by Josip Smodlaka in Split), Marjanović adopted Yugoslavist views. He was accused of involvement in the 1912 attempted assassination of the Ban Slavko Cuvaj and was forced into exile in Belgrade where, as a hired correspondent, he wrote articles on the Balkan Wars for several foreign newspapers. In 1913, he was awarded amnesty and returned to Zagreb where he launched Narodno jedinstvo' political magazine. Following the 1914 assassination of Archduke Franz Ferdinand in Sarajevo, Marjanović was confined to Kastav, and then imprisoned in Ljubljana and Zagreb, before being sent to Karlovac, before being drafted at the onset of the World War I. In April 1915, he fled to Paris where he took part in the founding of the Yugoslav Committee. Marjanović then moved to London, where he helped launch and later edited the Yugoslav Committee's monthly bulletin Yugoslav Bulletin/Bulletin Yougoslave published in English and French.

In late 1915, Marjanović moved to the United States to work with the South Slavic diaspora in New York. He established the Yugoslav Committee's office in Cleveland and organised the Congress of American Yugoslavs in Pittsburgh in 1916, before moving to Chile and Peru to promote South Slavic unification. In January 1917, Marjanović was appointed by the Yugoslav Committee as its representative at the island of Corfu, where the Serbian government-in-exile was based at the time. Later that year, he established and ran the Yugoslav Committee office in Saint Petersburg before transferring to the committee's central office in London in October 1917. Marjanović next transferred to Rome as the head of the committee's representative office in early 1918. He next went to lead the Yugoslav Committee's office in the United States in May 1918. In mid-May, he went on a tour in South America to raise support for the Yugoslav Committee. Following proclamation of the Kingdom of Serbs, Croats and Slovenes, and the appointment of the Yugoslav Committee's president Ante Trumbić, the foreign minister of the new state, Marjanović, took over as the committee's president. In 1919, he worked for the press committee of the Yugoslav Committee and at the mission of the newly established Kingdom of Serbs, Croats and Slovenes (later renamed Yugoslavia) at the Paris Peace Conference.

In December 1925, Marjanović travelled to the United States again. He went there with sculptor Ivan Meštrović and the sculptor's brother, Petar, to organise Meštrović's exhibitions in New York, Chicago, Philadelphia, Baltimore, Boston, and Cleveland. In the US, he took a course in photography and film directing at the New York Institute of Photography. The next year, he helped establish a film production unit at the School of People's Health in Zagreb and led the school's photo and film lab until 1929. Then he moved to Belgrade and led the central national press bureau until retirement in 1934. During World War II, he lived in Kastav, Rome, and Peruggia where he was arrested in 1942. He was imprisoned until the 1943 surrender of Italy, then joined the Yugoslav Partisans' mission in Bari in 1944, as a journalist. After the war, in 1945–1947, he worked at the Institute for the Study of International Issues of the Yugoslav Ministry of Foreign Affairs. In 1951, Marjanović became a full member of the Yugoslav Academy of Sciences and Arts. He died in Zagreb on 21 December 1955.

== Yugoslav nationalist ideology ==
Marjanović influenced the Yugoslav nationalism ideology espoused by the former members of the radical wing of the Croat-Serb Progressive Youth, who were dissatisfied with the pro-regime policies of the Croat-Serb Coalition. In 1912, inspired by Serbian military victories in the Balkan Wars, they established the Yugoslav Nationalist Youth (Jugoslavenska nacionalistička omladina, JNO) and denounced the parliamentary political struggle advocated by the coalition. As its ideology, the JNO adopted integral Yugoslavism and the cult of heroism inspired by the works of Jovan Cvijić, who ascribed virtues such as beauty, heroism, loyalty and democratic spirit to the ethnic Serb population of the Dinaric Alps. Conversely, he opposed the non-democratic and non-national practices of those living in the Pannonian Basin, specifically in central and eastern Croatia. Marjanović elaborated on Cvijić's ideas, claiming that Croatian Yugoslavism was feudal and conservative, therefore inferior to modern Serbian Yugoslavism. He arrived at his conclusion by comparing the Greater Serbian ideas of Vuk Karadžić and the Greater Croatian ideas of Ante Starčević—arguing that both were expressions of their awareness of South Slavic unity.

Marjanović introduced the idea of a unified Serbo-Croatian nation. In his collection of essays Narod koji nastaje: zašto nastaje i kako se formira jedinstveni srpsko-hrvatski narod (A Nation in Becoming: Why and How is a Unified Serbo-Croatian Nation Being Formed) published in 1913, Marjanović claimed that the Ottoman conquests in Europe both destroyed the medieval South Slavic kingdoms and stopped the formation of separate nations—creating an amalgamated South Slavic population. The variant of integral Yugoslavist ideology based on Cvijić's and Marjanović's work was subsequently adopted by the pro-regime Organization of Yugoslav Nationalists founded shortly after the establishment of Yugoslavia.

== Writing and filmmaking ==
Marjanović pursued literary criticism after 1894. By 1914, he had published more than 400 literary reviews. He followed the ideas of Vissarion Belinsky, Hippolyte Taine, and Georg Brandes, examining literature through the Tomáš Masaryk's utilitarian prism of social realism. This led him to numerous debates with critic Branimir Livadić and writer Antun Gustav Matoš. A sizeable portion of Marjanović's writings dealt with the works of Silvije Strahimir Kranjčević, Ante Kovačić, and Vladimir Nazor. Marjanović was among the first to recognise the value of Kovačić's novel U registraturi and thought Nazor one of the greatest Croatian authors. In 1906, Marjanović published Iza Šenoe, a literary review considered the first history of literary realism in Croatian literature. Marjanović also wrote plays, including one based on Kovačić's work, U registraturi, a novel and a series of political and literary-culture articles.

In 1920s, Marjanović published a series of works on occult topics: Četiri evangjelja religije relativnoga (lit. 'Four Gospels of the Religion of Relative'), Okultizam i esorerija (lit. 'Occultism and Esotericism'), and Načela i forme, dužnosti i odnosi, zadaci i metode slobodnog zidarstva uopće, a jugoslavenskog napose (lit. 'Principles and Forms, Duties and Relations, Tasks and Methods of Freemasonry in General and Yugoslav Freemasonry in Particular'). He was a Freemason from 1909 to 1940 and the head of the Ivan grof Drašković lodge in 1935. Marjanović took an interest in history. In the 1930s, he wrote a review of the history of the South Slavs until the 14th century Nasleđe prošlosti (lit. 'Heritage of the Past'), and a biography of Stjepan Radić (the assassinated leader of the Croatian Peasant Party). He also examined the Adriatic question, publishing a brochure Protiv okupatora (lit. 'Against the Occupier'), and, in the 1950s, wrote a book Borba za Jadran 1914–1946 (lit. 'Struggle for the Adriatic 1914–1946'). In 1960, his writings on diplomacy from World War I until 1924 were published under the title of Londonski ugovor (lit. 'Treaty of London'), referring to the 1915 treaty between the World War I Allies and Italy. He worked under the pseudonyms Anonimus, Branislav, Branislav Vinkov, Branko Vinković, Fidus, Historicus, Istranin, Jack, M. Branislav, M. Bršljanovački, Novus, Sincerus, Sperans, Verus, or Vinkov.

Marjanović was the screenwriter and director of approximately 20 documentary films produced by the School of People's Health from 1927 to 1932. They include films documenting the sculpting of Meštrović's The Bowman and The Spearman, and unveiling the same sculptor's Gregory of Nin. Marjanović made a documentary on Meštrović, but the film has been lost in the meantime. Marjanović was the author of one of the first Croatian animated films Martin u nebo, Martin iz neba produced in 1929. His son Branko also pursued filmmaking career.

== Sources ==
- Bacalja, Robert; Ivon, Katarina (2017). "Hrvatsko-srpski odnosi na stranicama Crvene Hrvatske" [Croatian-Serbian Relations as Presented by the Newspaper Crvena Hrvatska]. Radovi Zavoda za povijesne znanosti HAZU u Zadru (in Croatian). 59 (59). Zagreb: Croatian Academy of Sciences and Arts: 385–406. doi:10.21857/ygjwrcjo5y. ISSN 1330-0474.
- Bogner-Šaban, Antonija (2004). "Američka dramska epizoda Milana Marjanovića" [American Drama Episode of Milan Marjanović]. Dani Hvarskoga kazališta: Građa i rasprave o hrvatskoj književnosti i kazalištu (in Croatian). 30 (1). Croatian Academy of Sciences and Arts: 239–258. ISSN 1849-0158.
- Đurašković, Stevo (2011). "Ideologija Organizacije jugoslovenskih nacionalista (Orjuna)" [The Ideology of the Organization of Yugoslav Nationalists (ORJUNA)]. Časopis za suvremenu povijest (in Croatian). 43 (1). Zagreb: Croatian Institute of History: 225–247. ISSN 0590-9597.
- Holjevac, Željko (2005). "Stjepan Radić i Milan Marjanović o narodnom pokretu 1903. godine" [Stjepan Radić and Milan Marjanović on the National Movement of 1903]. Časopis za suvremenu povijest (in Croatian). 37 (3). Zagreb: Croatian Institute of History: 713–719. ISSN 0590-9597.
- Kokolari, Martina (2021) [2019–2021]. "Marjanović, Milan". Croatian Biographical Lexicon (in Croatian). Miroslav Krleža Institute of Lexicography.
- Mirošević, Franko (2005). "Godina 1903. u Hrvatskoj u hrvatskim udžbenicima" [Unrest in Croatia in 1903 in Croatian Textbooks]. Časopis za suvremenu povijest (in Croatian). 37 (3). Zagreb: Croatian Institute of History: 735–751. ISSN 0590-9597.
- Šakić, Tomislav (2021) [2019–2021]. "Marjanović, Branko". Croatian Biographical Lexicon (in Croatian). Miroslav Krleža Institute of Lexicography.
- Šepić, Dragovan (1960). "Jugoslavenski pokret i Milan Marjanović (1901–1919) (In memoriam Milanu Marjanoviću)" [Yugoslav Movement and Milan Marjanović (1901–1919) (In Memoriam of Milan Marjanović)]. Zbornik Odsjeka za povijesne znanosti Zavoda za povijesne i društvene znanosti Hrvatske akademije znanosti i umjetnosti (in Croatian). 3. Zagreb: Croatian Academy of Sciences and Arts: 531–561. ISSN 1330-7134.
- Šepić, Dragovan (1968). "Građa o radu istarskih predstavnika u jugoslavenskom odboru" [Material on Work of Istrian Representatives in the Yugoslav Committee]. Vjesnik historijskih arhiva u Rijeci i Pazinu (in Croatian). 11–12. State Archives in Pazin: 221–298. ISSN 0351-0891.
- Trencsényi, Balász; Janowski, Maciej; Baár, Mónika; Falina, Maria; Kopeček, Michal (2016). A History of Modern Political Thought in East Central Europe: Volume I: Negotiating Modernity in the 'Long Nineteenth Century'. Oxford: Oxford University Press. ISBN 9780191056956.
