= Kolo (choral society) =

Croatian Choral Society "Kolo" (Note: Croatian: Hrvatsko pjevačko društvo "Kolo") was a choral society formed in 1862 in order to promote Croatian music and musical culture. It existed for 86 years and played a central role in the cultural life of Zagreb and Croatia at the time, both in Austria-Hungary and Yugoslavia. It organized a female and a male choir, and for a time an orchestra and a tamburica band. The society built its own building in the centre of Zagreb in 1884, and it also engaged in publishing.

After World War II, the activity of the society started to stagnate, they were no longer allowed to use the same spaces, and were forced to evacuate their own archives on a short notice. Their archives included original scores by Vatroslav Lisinski and Ivan pl. Zajc. The legacy materials of the society became scattered, and are today kept in large parts in the State Archives in Zagreb and the Croatian Music Institute, but also to some extent in the Croatian State Archives as well as in the Croatian Sports Museum, as the last secretary of the society was also an ardent member of the Croatian Sokol movement.

== Sources ==
- Klajzner, Ivana (2020). "»Rasuta bašćina«: slučaj Hrvatskog pjevačkog društva »Kolo«" [»Scattered Heritage«: The Case of the Croatian Singing Society »Kolo«]. Arti musices (in Croatian). 51 (1). Croatian Musicological Society. ISSN 1848-9303.
