= Vladimir Vidrić =

Croatian poet

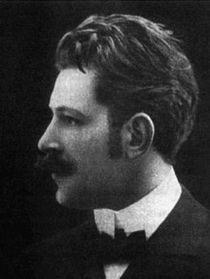
Vladimir Vidrić

Vladimir Vidrić (April 30, 1875 – September 29, 1909) was a Croatian poet, and is considered one of the major figures of Croatian secessionist poetry.

== Life ==
Vidrić was born in Zagreb, to an affluent family of Slovenian origin. He was one of the leaders of the demonstrators who burned the Hungarian flag on the occasion of the emperor Franz Joseph's visit to Zagreb in 1895. He studied law in Prague, Graz and Vienna. After obtaining his Ph.D. in 1903, he became a lawyer rather than pursuing an academic career.

He began writing poems in high school, and was first recognized for his poem Boni mores, published in Vienac in 1897. Before his premature death, he wrote only about 40 poems, most of which he self-published in his 1907 collection with the simple title Pjesme (Poems).

In addition to his affiliations with controversial progressive political circles, Vidrić was known for his adventurous life, great intelligence, and prodigious memory. He was an outstanding student, and spent entire evenings reciting memorized poetry to his amazed friends.

He died under obscure circumstances in the mental hospital in the Zagreb suburb of Vrapče.

== Poetry ==
As a rule, Vidrić's poetic atmospheres develop from a concrete scene. The poet is lost or hidden in a mythological character. His images of a barbaric, classical and mythological world are very personal. He was an impressionist with a strong visual imagination.

His best poems, such as Jutro (Morning), Dva pejzaža (Two landscapes), Adieu, Ex Pannonia, Dva levita (Two Levites), include some of the best verses ever written in Croatian. Some of his contemporaries, such as Matoš, accused him of technical imperfections, wrong accents in rhymes, and raw style. However, Vidrić was simply before his time, choosing to base his rhythm on main accents rather than feet.

The Croatian literary historian Ivo Frangeš wrote, "Vidrić's world feels like a fragment of an ancient vase, where the incomplete nature of the preserved scene is used to strengthen the effect. It is a miniature world, painfully clear, with a miraculous third dimension that goes far beyond our everyday ideas of width and depth."

== Sources ==
- Vidrić, Vladimir (in Croatian)
- Vladimir Vidrić (in Croatian)
