= Nicholas J. Miller =

American professor of history

- Education: UC Santa Barbara BA; Indiana University MA and PhD

Nicholas J. Miller is an American Professor of History at Boise State University.

Miller received a B.A. in History from UC Santa Barbara and his M.A. and PhD from Indiana University. Miller's work and research focuses on the lands of the former Yugoslavia. He has received fellowships from the International Research and Exchanges Board, the Andrew W. Mellon Foundation, American Council of Learned Societies, and Woodrow Wilson International Center for Scholars. He has written articles on Croatian and Serbian history.

Miller has written two books on the former Yugoslavia. Between Nation and State: Serbian Politics in Croatia Before the First World War narrates politics in Croatia prior to World War I. The Nonconformists: Culture, Politics, and Nationalism in a Serbian Cultural Circle, 1944-1991 looks at the role of Serbian intellectuals in political change in Yugoslavia and Serbia post-World War II, focusing on three individuals; novelist Dobrica Ćosić, painter Mića Popović and literary critic Borislav Mihajlović Mihiz.

== Selected works ==
=== Books ===
- Between Nation and State: Serbian Politics in Croatia Before the First World War. University of Pittsburgh Press, 1997. ISBN 978-0-82297-722-3
- The Nonconformists: Culture, Politics, and Nationalism in a Serbian Intellectual Circle, 1944-1991. Central European University Press, 2007. ISBN 978-9-63732-693-6

=== Chapters in books ===
- "Yugoslavia" in Chronology of 20th-Century Eastern European History. Edited by Gregory C. Ference. Gale Research, Inc., 1994. ISBN 978-0-81038-879-6
- "Return Engagement: Intellectuals and Nationalism in Tito's Yugoslavia" in State Collapse in South-Eastern Europe: New Perspectives on Yugoslavia's Disintegration. Edited by Lenard J. Cohen & Jasna Dragović-Soso. Purdue University Press, 2008. ISBN 978-1-55753-460-6
- "Where Was the Serbian Havel?" in The End and the Beginning: The Revolutions of 1989 and the Resurgence of History. Edited by Vladimir Tismaneanu & Bogdan C. Iacob. Central European University Press, 2012. ISBN 978-6-15505-365-8

=== Articles in journals ===
- "The Children of Cain: Dobrica Ćosić's Serbia" in East European Politics & Societies. University of California Press, 2000. doi:10.1177/0888325400014002003
- "Mihiz in the Sixties: Politics and Drama Between Nationalism and Authoritarianism" in Nationalities Papers. Cambridge University Press, 2002. doi:10.1080/00905992.2002.10540509
- "Nationalism and Policymaking in the Balkans" in Georgetown Journal of International Affairs, vol. 7, no. 2. Georgetown University Press, 2006.
