= D35 road (Croatia) =

State road in northwestern Croatia

D35 state road

Route information
- Length: 46.0 km (28.6 mi)

Major junctions
- From: D2 near Varaždin
- D74 in Lepoglava; D29 in Novi Golubovec
- To: D1 near Sveti Križ Začretje

Location
- Country: Croatia
- Counties: Krapina-Zagorje, Varaždin
- Major cities: Varaždin, Ivanec, Lepoglava

Highway system
- Highways in Croatia

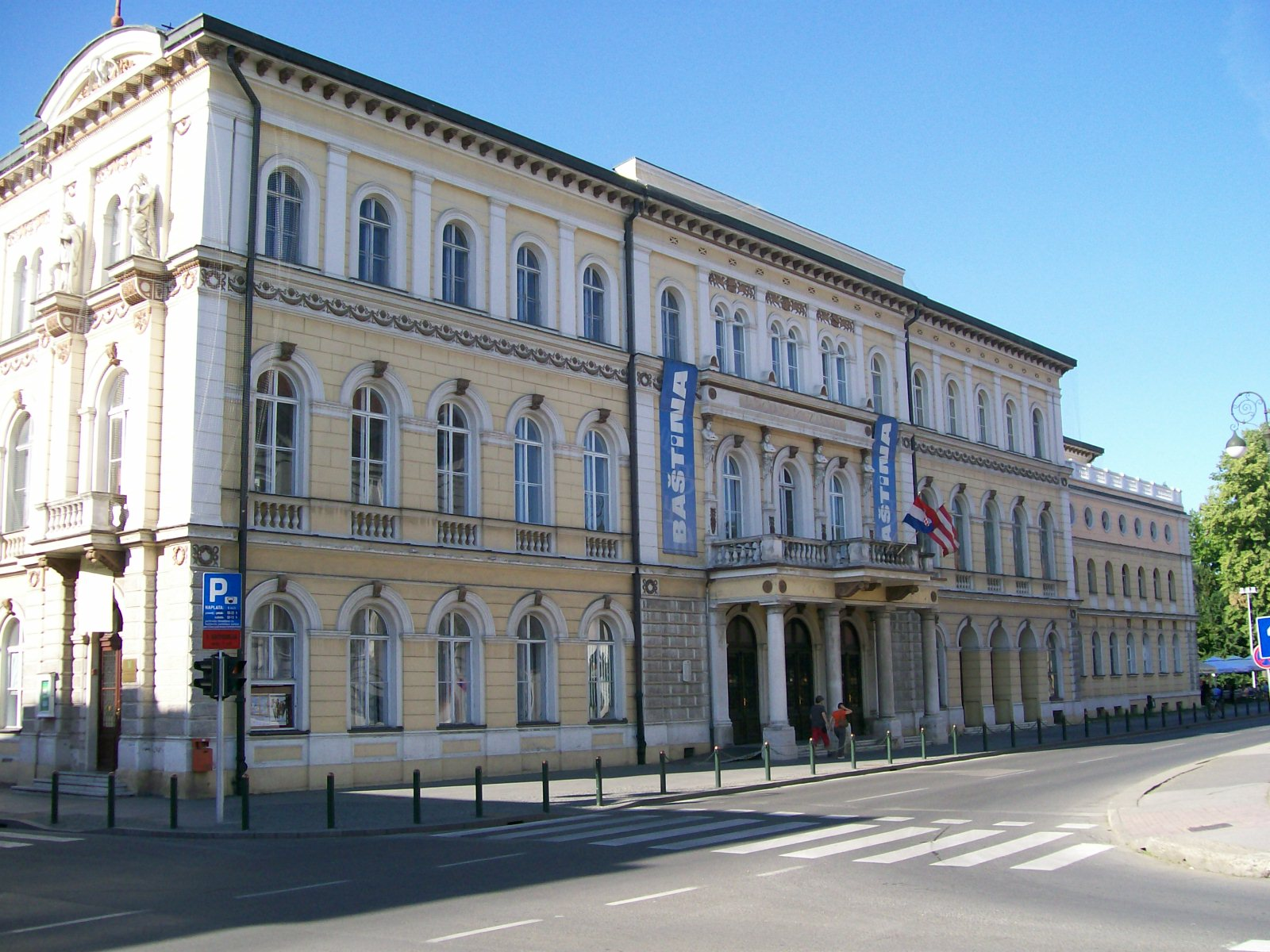
Varaždin, near the northern terminus of the D35 road

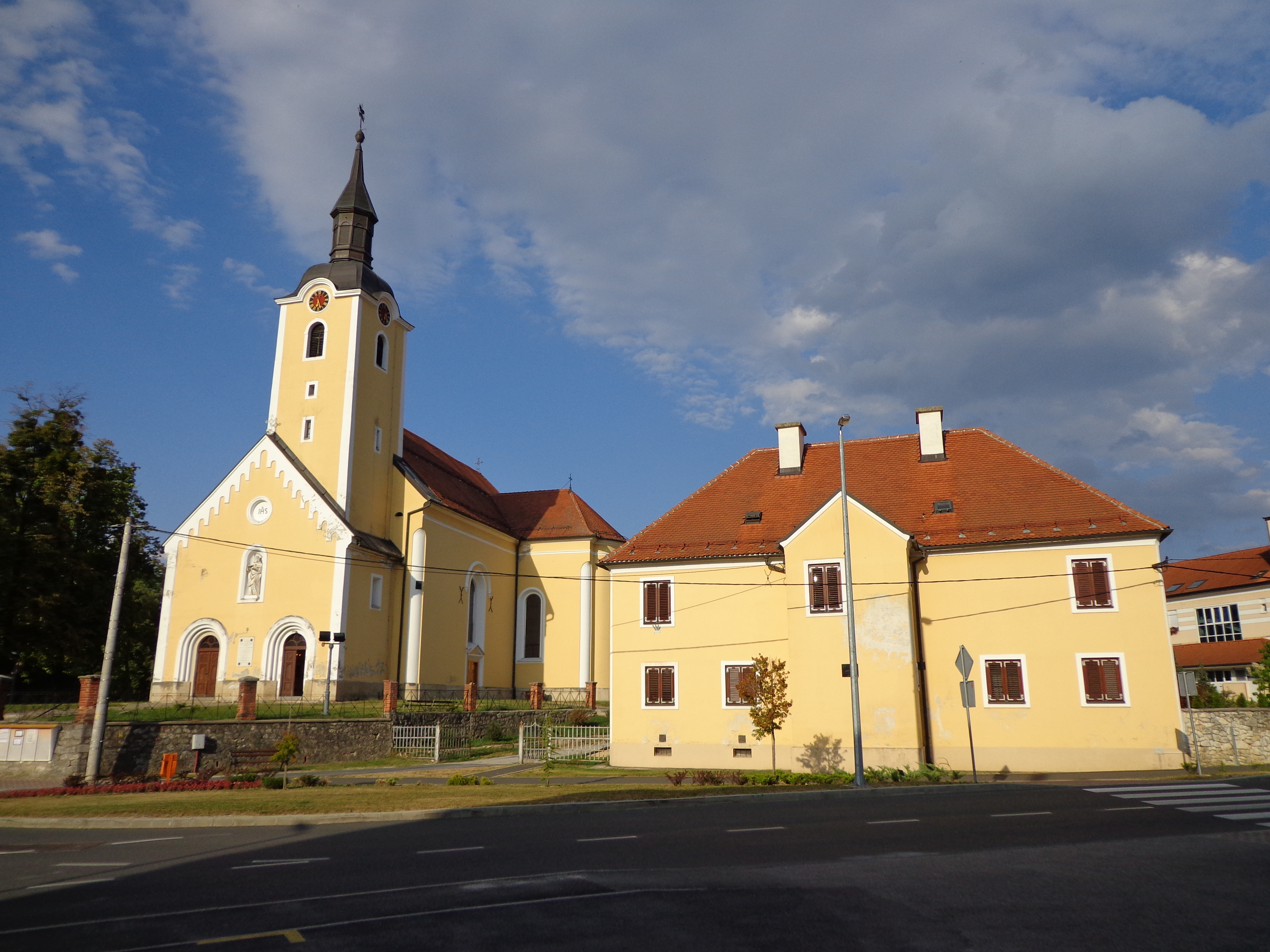
Ivanec, on the D35 road route

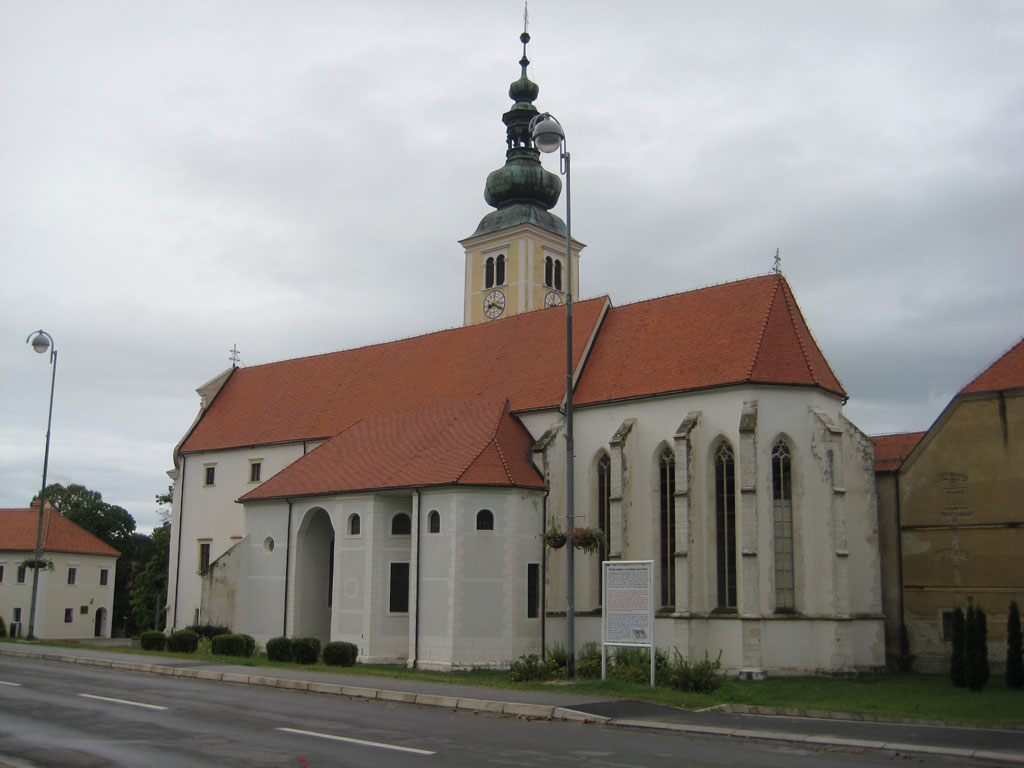
Lepoglava, on the D35 road route

D35 is a state road in northwestern Croatia connecting Sveti Križ Začretje and the A2 motorway Sveti Križ Začretje interchange to Varaždin and the A4 motorway Varaždin interchange. The road is 46.0 km (28.6 mi) long.

The road, as well as all other state roads in Croatia, is managed and maintained by Hrvatske ceste, state owned company.

== Traffic volume ==
Traffic is regularly counted and reported by Hrvatske ceste, operator of the road.

D35 traffic volume
Road	Counting site	AADT	ASDT	Notes
D35	1213 Greda	5,250	4,936	Adjacent to the Ž2063 junction. Average daily traffic figure is provided instead of AADT.
D35	1216 Kaniža - west	4,294	4,548	Between the Ž2084 and Ž2102 junctions.
D35	1123 Gornja Šemnica	1,938	1,670	Between the Ž122 and Ž2122 junction. The AADT figure estimated by Hrvatske ceste.

== Road junctions and populated areas ==
D35 junctions/populated areas
Type	Slip roads/Notes
	Nedeljanec; D2 to Dubrava Križovljanska border crossing to Slovenia (to the west) and to the A4 motorway Varaždin interchange (via the D528) and Koprivnica (D41). Ž2061 to Krkanec and Tužno. The eastern terminus of the road.
	Vidovec
	Jurketinec
	Ž2029 to Biljevec and Vinica.
	Greda
	Ž2063 to Tužno, Črešnjevo and Beretinec.
	Ž2059 to Koškovec and Klenovnik.
	Ž2105 to Salinovec, Pece and Završje Podbelsko.
	Ž2104 to Punikve.
	Ivanec; Ž2103 within the town. Ž2085 to Prigorec
	Kaniža; Ž2084 to Dubrovec.
	Lepoglava; D74 to Krapina and Đurmanec (D207). Ž2101 to Bedenec and Jerovec. Ž2102 within the town.
	Muričevec
	Novi Golubovec; D29 to Zlatar Bistrica, Marija Bistrica and Soblinec (D3).
	Ž2127 to Gora Veternička.
	Kuzminec
	Ž2125 to Mihovljan and Sutinske Toplice.
	Ž2122 to Radoboj, Trški Vrh and Krapina (D1).
	Donja Šemnica
	Ž2240 to Lepajci (D1).
	Švaljkovec; D1 to Krapina (D206) and Macelj border crossing to Slovenia (to the north) and to the A2 motorway Sveti Križ Začretje interchange and Zabok (D24). Ž2160 to Sveti Križ Začretje. The western terminus of the road.
