= Maruševec =

- Municipality
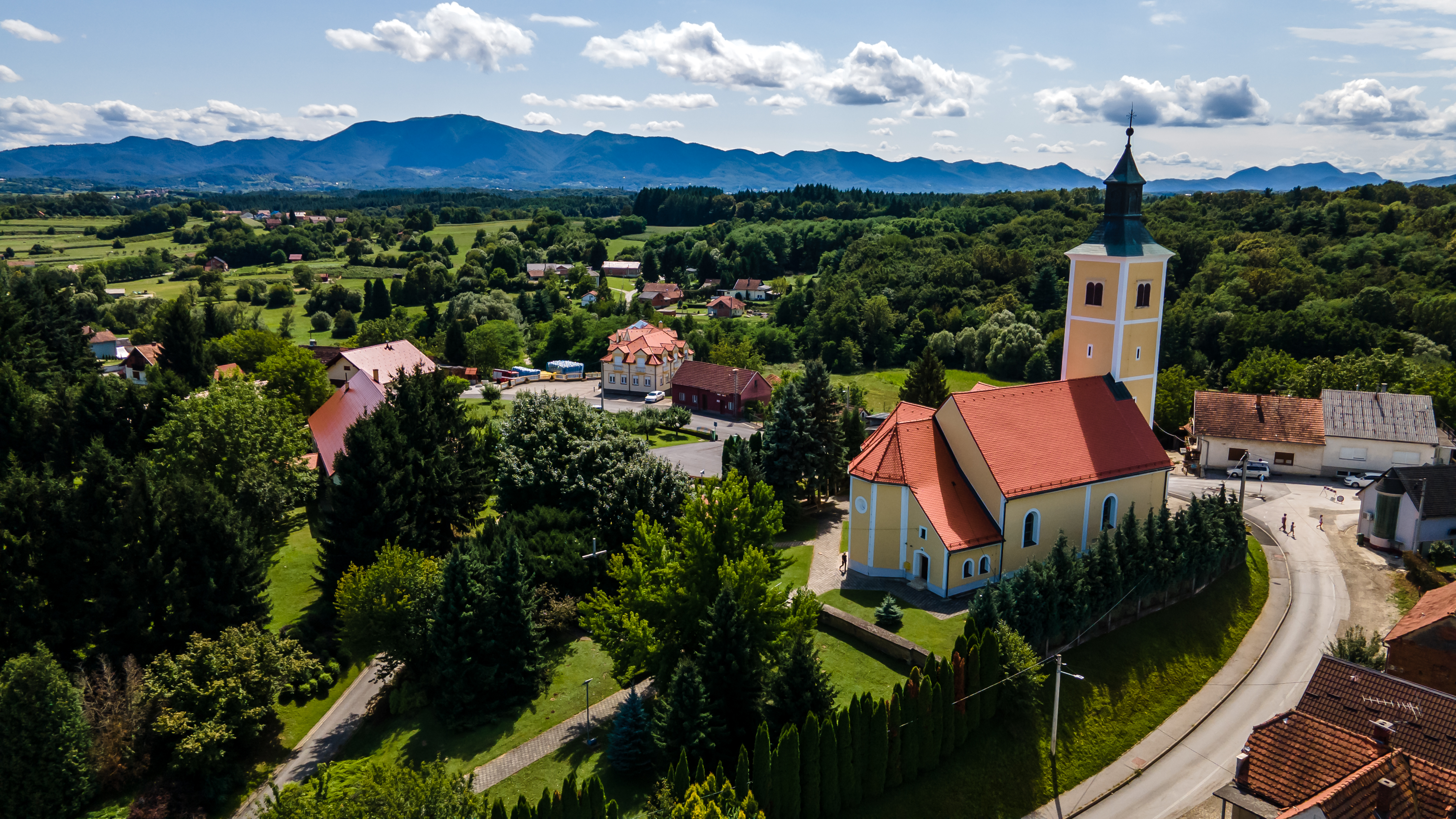
- Aerial view of Maruševec
- Interactive map of Maruševec
- Location of Maruševec in Croatia
- Coordinates: 46°17′N 16°11′E
- Country: Croatia
- County: Varaždin County

Area
  - Municipality: 50.0 km^{2} (19.3 sq mi)
  - Urban: 5.1 km^{2} (2.0 sq mi)

Population (2021)
  - Municipality: 5,682
  - Density: 114/km^{2} (294/sq mi)
  - Urban: 391
  - Urban density: 77/km^{2} (200/sq mi)
- Website: marusevec.hr

Maruševec (Hungarian: Máriasócszentgyörgy, Kajkavian: Maršuvic, Maršovec, or Maršuvec) is a village and municipality in Croatia in Varaždin County.

According to the 2011 census, there are 6,381 inhabitants, in the following settlements:

- Bikovec, population 216
- Biljevec, population 258
- Brodarovec, population 202
- Cerje Nebojse, population 445
- Čalinec, population 572
- Donje Ladanje, population 1,166
- Druškovec, population 362
- Greda, population 567
- Jurketinec, population 422
- Kapelec, population 106
- Korenjak, population 82
- Koretinec, population 369
- Koškovec, population 222
- Maruševec, population 460
- Novaki, population 533
- Selnik, population 399

Fran Novak, Maruševec, population 1

The absolute majority of the population are Croats.

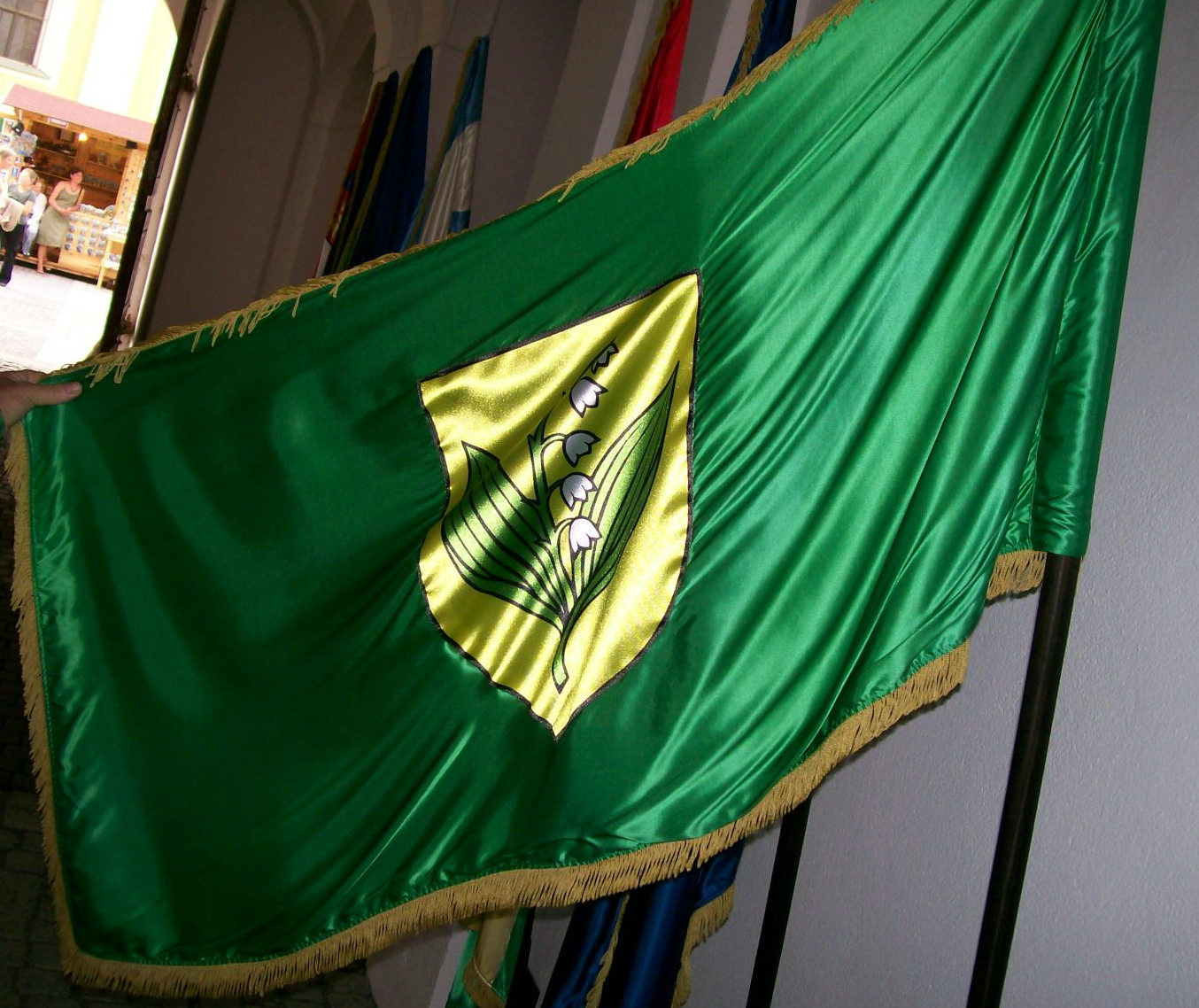
Flag of Municipality of Maruševec

== Notable buildings ==
- Maruševec Castle

== Bibliography ==
=== History ===
- Jagić, Suzana (2009-11-10). "Povijesne okolnosti osnutka pučkih škola u Višnjici, Ivancu, Maruševcu i Bednji 1839. godine" [The Historical Circumstances Surrounding the Foundation of Elementary Schools in Višnjica, Maruševec and Bednja in the Year 1839]. Kaj: časopis za književnost, umjetnost, kulturu (in Croatian). 42 (4–5): 115–126. eISSN 1848-7920.
