= Lipovnik =

Lipovnik may refer to:

- Lipovník, Topoľčany District, Slovakia
- Lipovník, Rožňava District, Slovakia
- Lipovnik, Croatia, a village near Klenovnik, Croatia
