= Lipovník =

Lipovník may refer to:

- Lipovník, Topoľčany District, Slovakia
- Lipovník, Rožňava District, Slovakia
