= Kaniža =

Kaniža may refer to:

- Kaniža, the Croatian name for Nagykanizsa, Hungary
- Kaniža, Varaždin County, a village near Ivanec, Croatia
- Kaniža, Brod-Posavina County, a village near Bebrina, Croatia
- Kaniža, Šentilj, a village in Slovenia
- Kaniža Gospićka, a village near Gospić, Croatia

== See also ==
- Kanizsa (disambiguation)
- Kanjiža, a town and municipality in Vojvodina, Serbia
