= Kuzminec =

Kuzminec may refer to:

- Kuzminec, Krapina-Zagorje County, a village near Mihovljan, Croatia
- Kuzminec, Koprivnica-Križevci County, a village near Rasinja, Croatia
