= Pece =

Pece may refer to:

- Pece, Varaždin County, a village near Ivanec, Croatia
- Pece, Krapina-Zagorje County, a village near Budinščina, Croatia
