= Carl Gustav Swensson =

Swedish landscape architect

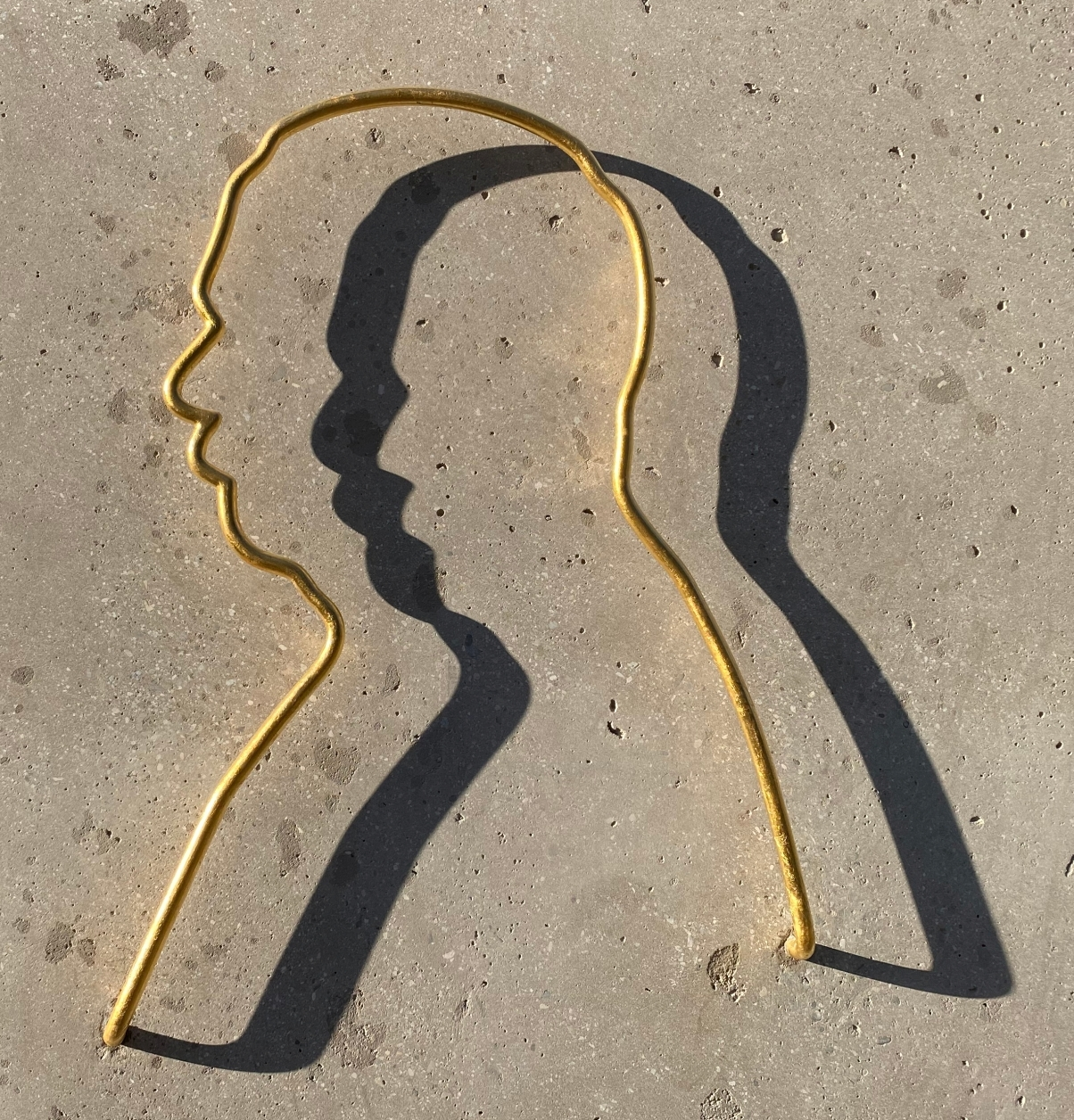
- Portrait in Žilina
- Born: Svensson; 15 June 1861; Jönköping, Sweden
- Died: 13 April 1910 (aged 48); Vienna, Austria
- Known for: Landscape architect
- Notable work: Parks and private gardens in Slovakia, Germany, Austria, Poland, Slovenia and Switzerland
- Spouse: Ida Swensson

Carl Gustav Swensson (also spelled Svensson; 15 June 1861 – 13 April 1910) was a Swedish landscape architect.

== Biography ==
Swensson was born in Jönköping and educated by his father, Anders Gustaf Svensson. In 1880 or 1881 he moved to Würzburg, Germany, where he worked until 1887 as an assistant of the city gardener Jöns Persson Lindahl. In 1887 he moved to Vienna, the capital of Austria. From 1891 he worked in Rüschlikon, Switzerland, and then again in Vienna. In today's Slovakia, in 1891, he implemented a project for a park around the Hungarian Wool Fabric, Military Clothing and Blankets Factory in Žilina (German: Ungarische Wollwaren, Militärtuch- und Deckenfabrik Actiengesellschaft in Sillein). After 1900, he was primarily designing the parks in the spa town Mariánské Lázně. Since 1906, he worked in the territory of the nowadays Slovenia for the family Pongratz. He designed the park around the Zora Villa in Bled and of Šenek Mansion in Polzela. He also designed the park of Maruševec Mansion in Varaždin.

Swensson received numerous prizes for his work. In 2000 a memorial plaque dedicated to him was unveiled in Bled.In 2021 a park designed by Swensson in 1891, located in Žilina, Slovakia, was renamed after him. At the same time, a memorial was unveiled.

== Gallery ==
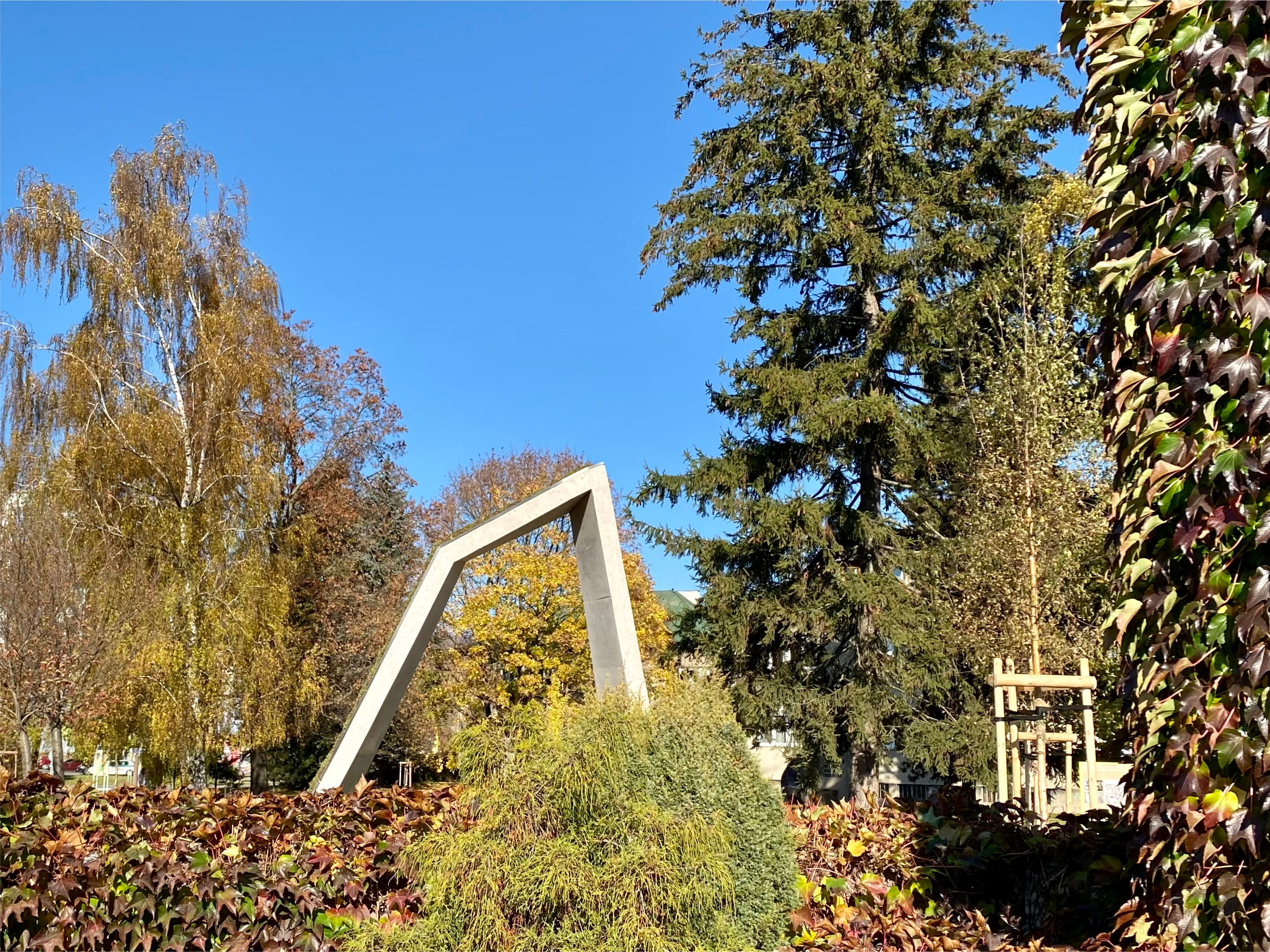
Carl Gustav Swensson Memorial in Žilina

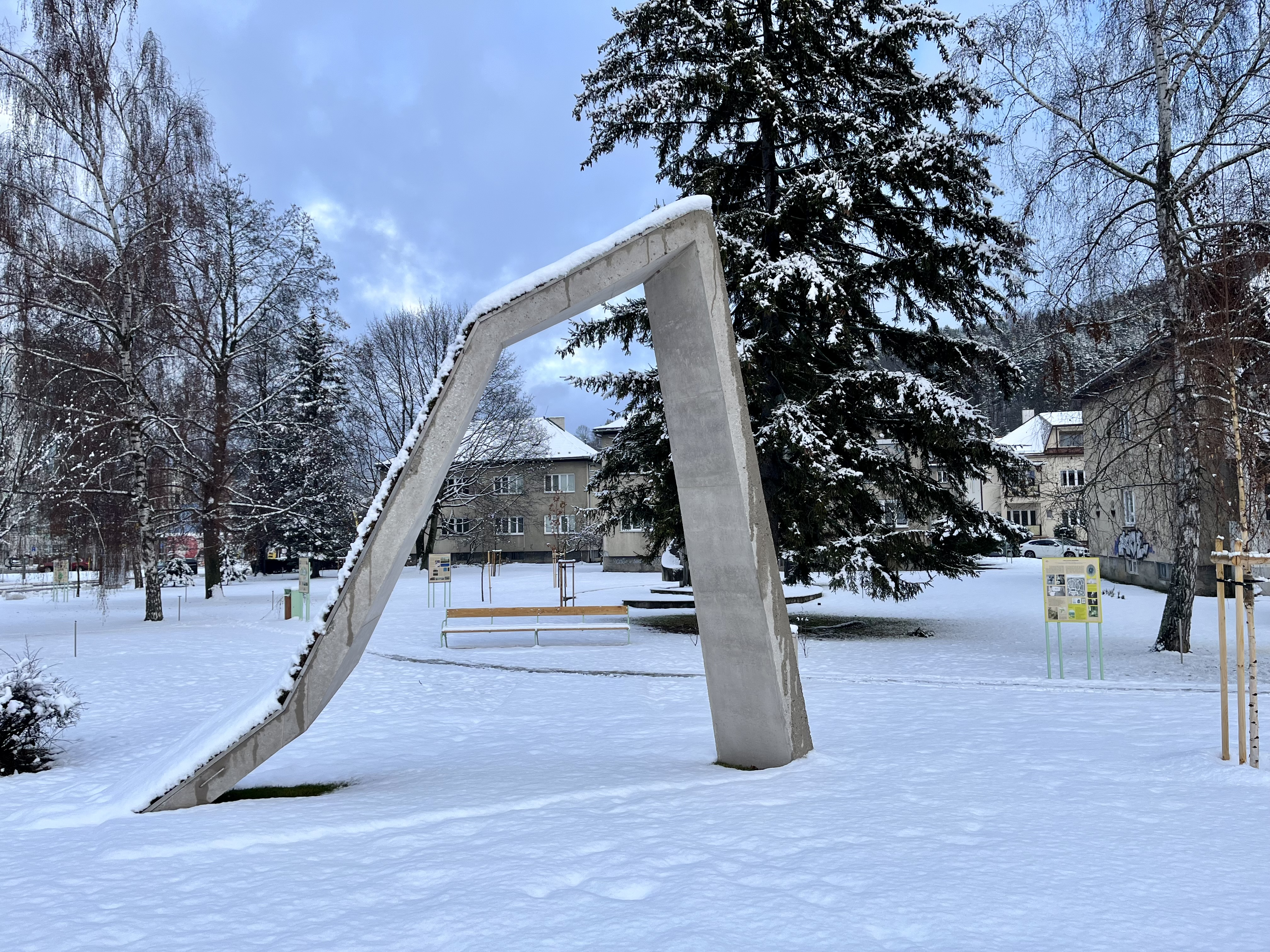
Carl Gustav Swensson Memorial

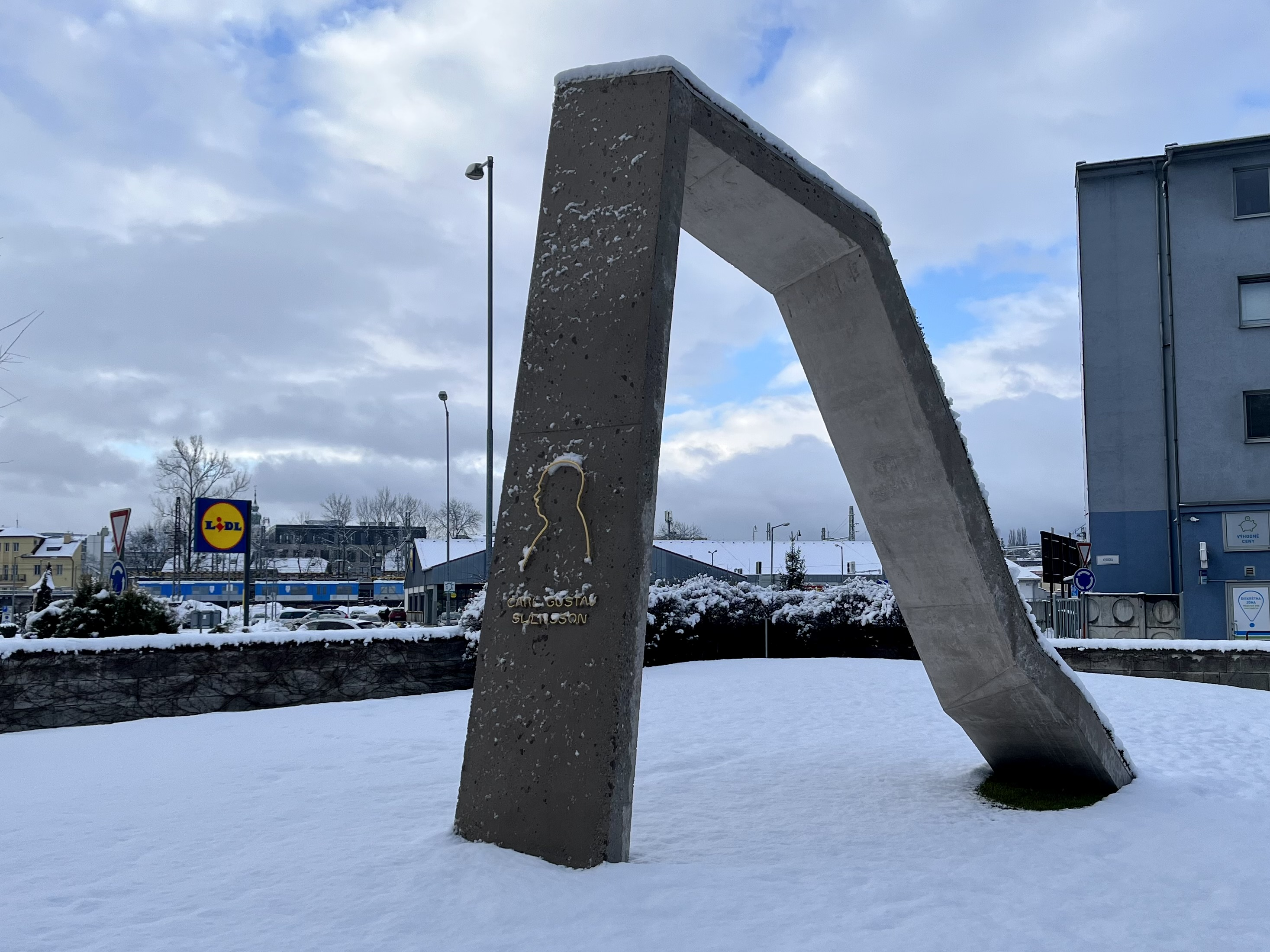
Portrait of Carl Gustav Swensson

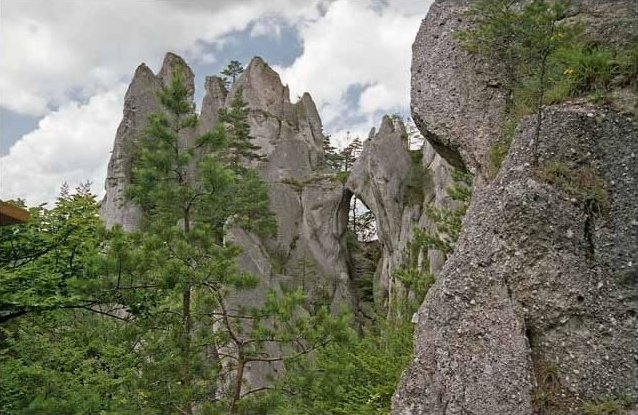
"Gotická brána" in the Súľov Rocks was the inspiration for the memorial

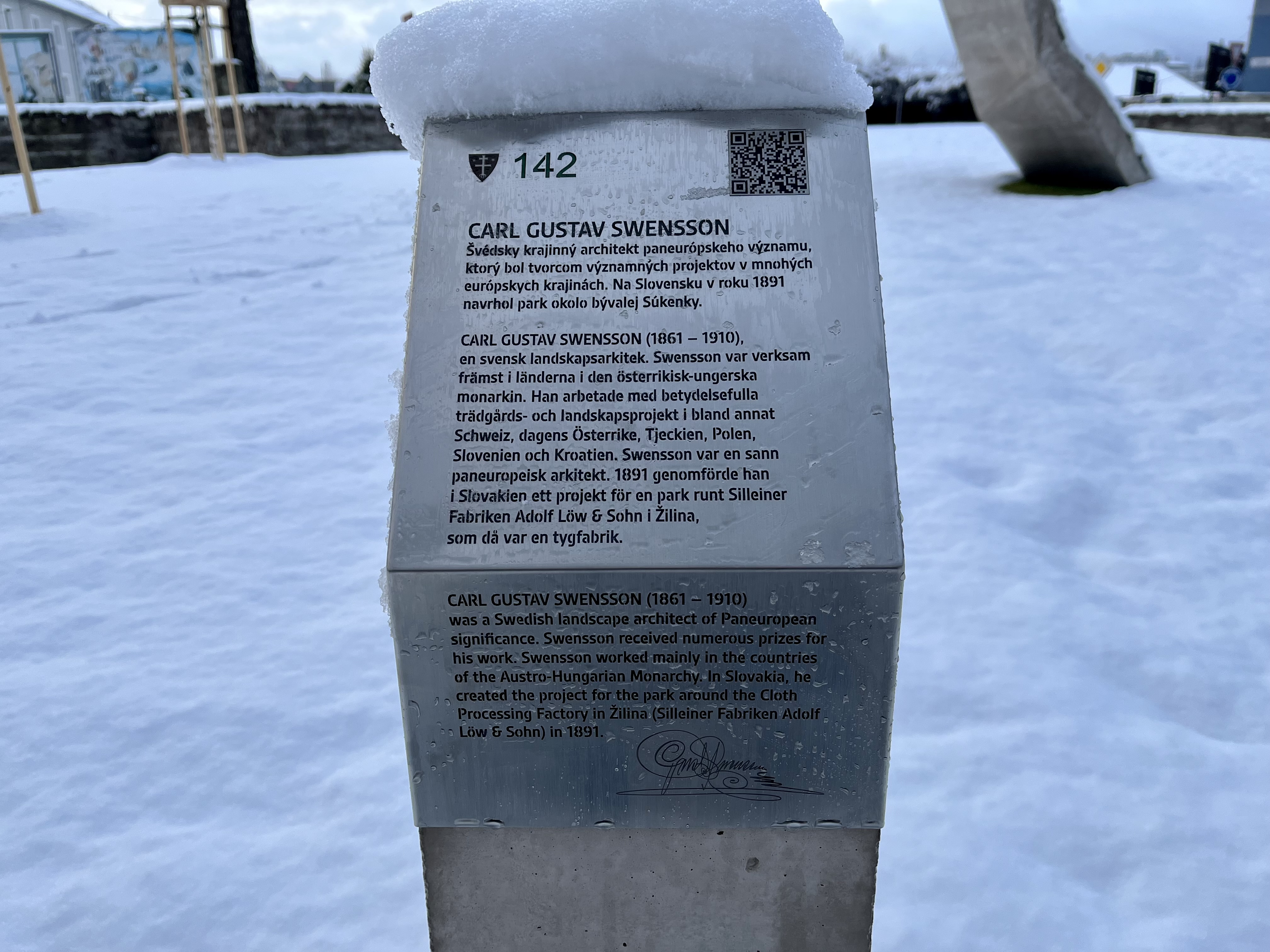
QR code next to the memorial
