= Mihovljan =

Mihovljan is the name of two villages in northern Croatia:

- Mihovljan, Krapina-Zagorje County, located approximately 10 kilometres from Krapina
- Mihovljan, Međimurje County, a suburb of Čakovec
