= Ivanec =

- Town
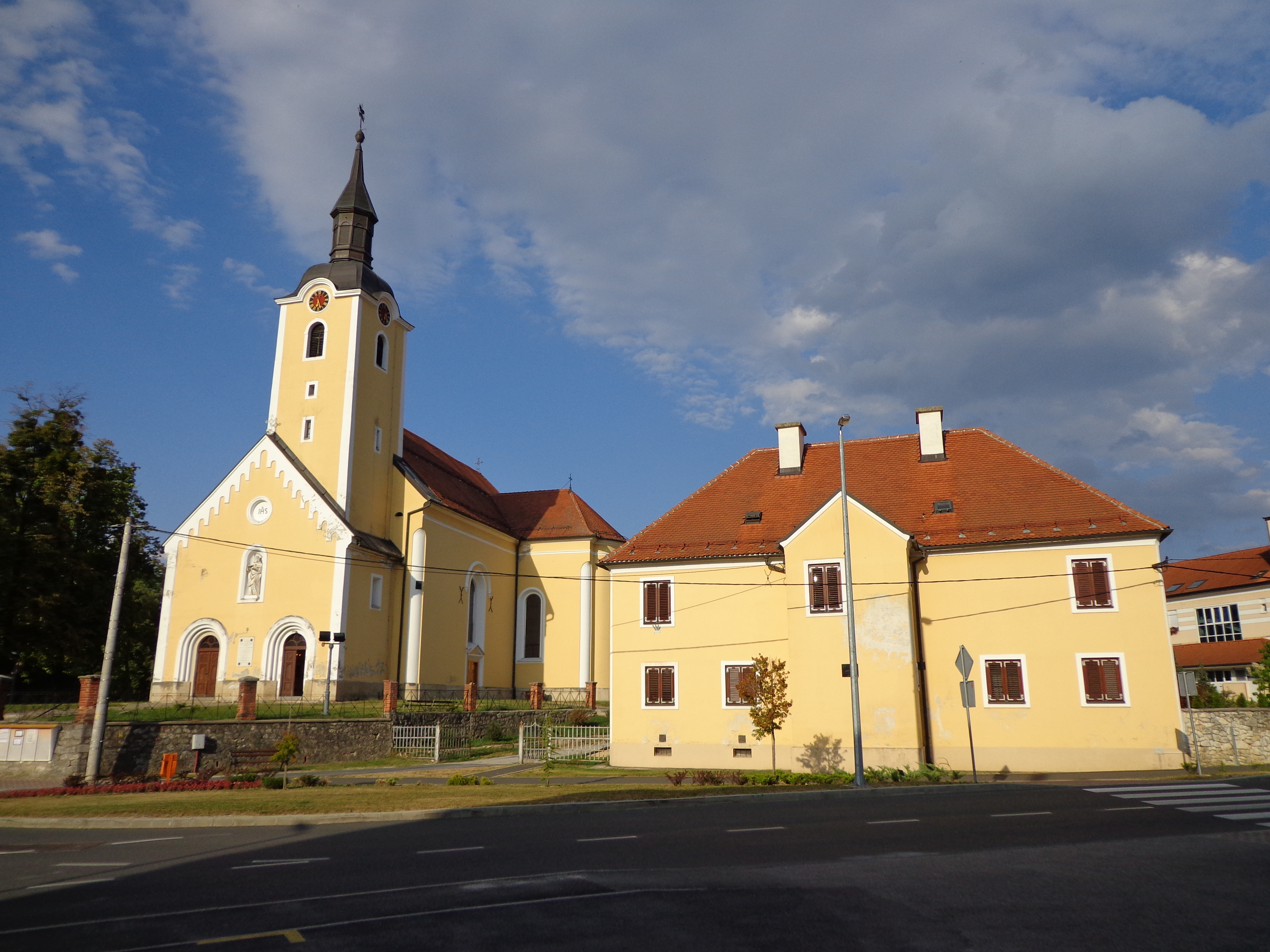
- Church of Saint Mary Magdalene with parsonage

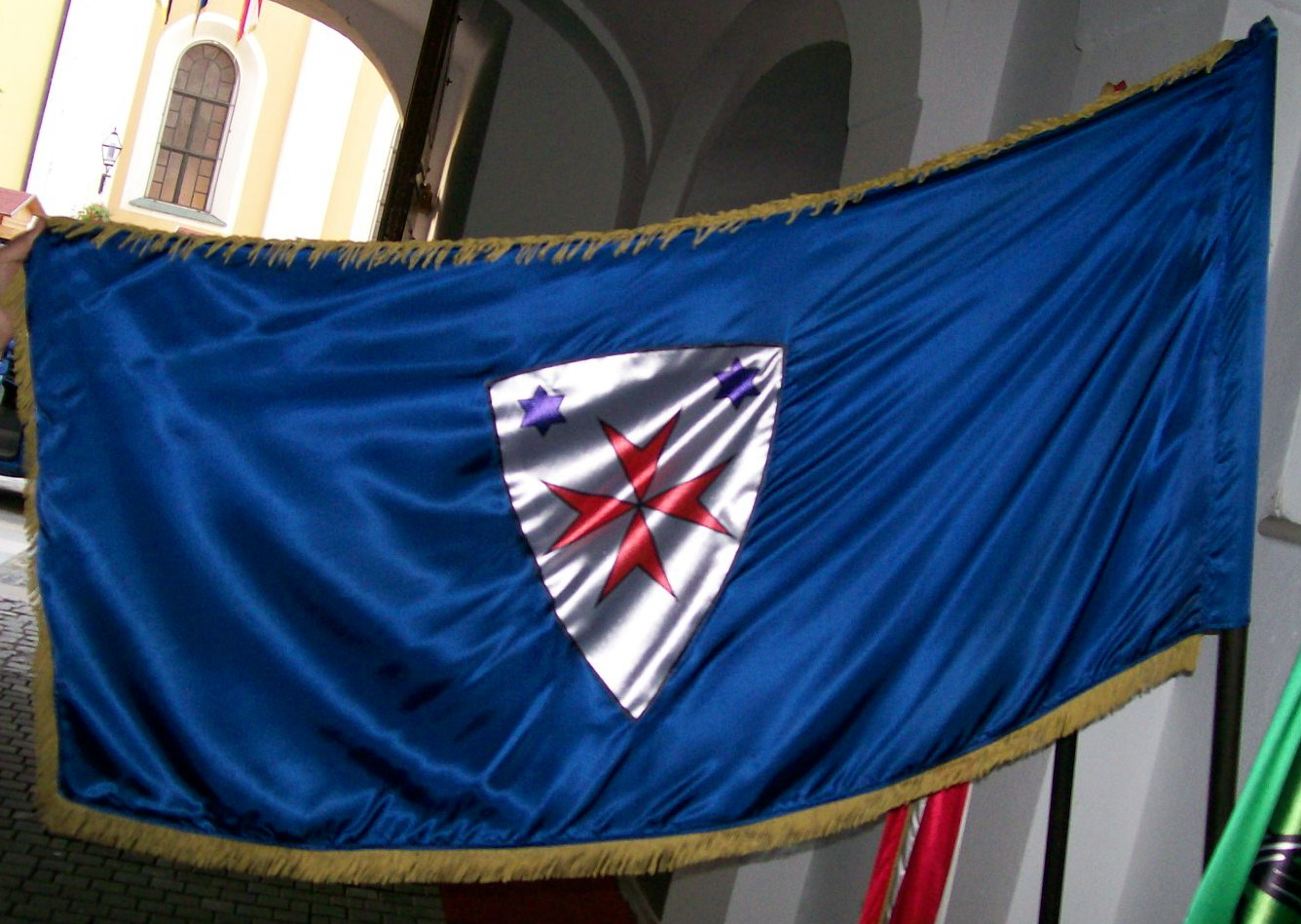
- Flag
- Interactive map of Ivanec
- Location of Ivanec in Croatia
- Coordinates: 46°13′35″N 16°07′31″E
- Country: Croatia
- Region: Central Croatia (Hrvatsko Zagorje)
- County: Varaždin County

Government
  - Mayor: Milorad Batinić (NPS)

Area
  - Town: 95.9 km^{2} (37.0 sq mi)
  - Urban: 8.5 km^{2} (3.3 sq mi)

Population (2021)
  - Town: 12,723
  - Density: 133/km^{2} (344/sq mi)
  - Urban: 4,997
  - Urban density: 590/km^{2} (1,500/sq mi)
- Time zone: UTC+1 (Central European Time)
- Website: ivanec.hr

Ivanec is a town in northern Croatia, located southwest of Varaždin, east of Lepoglava and north of the mountain Ivanščica.

== History ==
In the late 19th and early 20th century, Ivanec was a district capital in Varaždin County of the Kingdom of Croatia-Slavonia.

== Population ==
In the 2011 census, the population of the municipality was 13,765, in the following settlements:

- Bedenec, population 732
- Cerje Tužno, population 182
- Gačice, population 355
- Gečkovec, population 116
- Horvatsko, population 173
- Ivanec, population 5,234
- Ivanečka Željeznica, population 253
- Ivanečki Vrhovec, population 307
- Ivanečko Naselje, population 237
- Jerovec, population 827
- Kaniža, population 287
- Knapić, population 62
- Lančić, population 299
- Lovrečan, population 490
- Lukavec, population 141
- Margečan, population 384
- Osečka, population 220
- Pece, population 81
- Prigorec, population 531
- Punikve, population 445
- Radovan, population 372
- Ribić Breg, population 145
- Salinovec, population 512
- Seljanec, population 223
- Stažnjevec, population 340
- Škriljevec, population 247
- Vitešinec, population 96
- Vuglovec, population 333
- Željeznica, population 134
Town of Ivanec: Population trends 1857–2021
v

population	6086	6864	7455	8925	9816	11241	11591	12570	13685	13982	13143	13243	13967	14630	14434	13758	12723
	1857	1869	1880	1890	1900	1910	1921	1931	1948	1953	1961	1971	1981	1991	2001	2011	2021

Sources: Croatian Bureau of Statistics publications

== Governance ==
Representatives of Ivanec at the Croatian Parliament:

- Hinko Francisci (1887–1906)

== Sports ==
The local chapter of the HPS is HPD "Ivančica", which had 39 members in 1936 under the Albert Špiler presidency. At one point, it had both a ski section and a photography section, but they were abandoned in 1935. Membership rose to 47 in 1937. Membership fell to 44 in 1938 under the new president Đuro Radačić.

== Bibliography ==
=== History ===
- Jagić, Suzana (2020-12-31). "Poučavanje zavičajne povijesti u suradnji s muzejskim institucijama na primjeru školskog projekta "Moj grad u muzeju"" [Teaching Regional History in Partnership with Museum Institutions on the Example of the School Project "My City in the Museum"]. Povijest u nastavi (in Serbo-Croatian) (31): 31–46. eISSN 1849-1480.
- Poljak, Sonja (2017-12-28). "Obitelj Kukuljević Sakcinski i Ivanec" [The Kukuljević Sakcinski Family and Ivanec]. Studia lexicographica: časopis za leksikografiju i enciklopedistiku (in Serbo-Croatian). 10–11 (19–20): 275–280. eISSN 2459-5578.
- Miljan, Zrinka; Mihaljević, Josip (2017-02-20). "Ivanec kao eksperimentalna lokacija jugoslavenske samoposlužne trgovine" [Ivanec as Location of the Yugoslav Experimental Self-Service Store]. Radovi Zavoda za hrvatsku povijest Filozofskoga fakulteta Sveučilišta u Zagrebu (in Serbo-Croatian). 48: 353–385. doi:10.17234/RADOVIZHP.48.18. eISSN 1849-0344.
- Repanić-Braun, Mirjana (2012-12-28). "Prilog istraživanju baroknog slikarstva u Hrvatskoj − zidne slike u Višnjici i Koprivničkom Ivancu". Radovi Instituta za povijest umjetnosti (in Serbo-Croatian). 36: 141–152. eISSN 1845-4534.
- Poljak, Sonja (2012-12-03). "Hrvatska historiografija o Ivancu u srednjem vijeku" [Croatian Historiography of Ivanec in the Middle Ages]. Historia Varasdiensis: časopis za varaždinsku povjesnicu (in Serbo-Croatian). 2: 91–98. ISSN 1848-0837.
- Jagić, Suzana (2011-06-14). "Društveno - gospodarski razvoj Ivanca od 1918. do 1941. godine" [The Socioeconomic Development of Ivanec from 1918 to 1941]. Radovi Zavoda za znanstveni rad Varaždin (in Serbo-Croatian) (22): 13–65. eISSN 1848-7890.
- Jagić, Suzana (2009-11-10). "Povijesne okolnosti osnutka pučkih škola u Višnjici, Ivancu, Maruševcu i Bednji 1839. godine" [The Historical Circumstances Surrounding the Foundation of Elementary Schools in Višnjica, Maruševec and Bednja in the Year 1839]. Kaj: časopis za književnost, umjetnost, kulturu (in Croatian). 42 (4–5): 115–126. eISSN 1848-7920.
- Jagić, Suzana (2008-12-17). "Učiteljstvo kotara Ivanec od sredine 19. stoljeća do 1918. godine" [Pedagogy in Ivanec Kotar from the Mid-19th Century to the Year 1918]. Radovi Zavoda za hrvatsku povijest Filozofskoga fakulteta Sveučilišta u Zagrebu (in Serbo-Croatian) (40): 175–187. eISSN 1849-0344.
