= Lovrečan, Varaždin County =

Lovrečan
- Village
- Location within Croatia
- Coordinates: 46°14′19.44″N 16°14′40.39″E
- Country: Croatia
- County: Varaždin County
- Municipality: Ivanec

Area
  - Total: 3.1 km^{2} (1.2 sq mi)

Population (2021)
  - Total: 439
  - Density: 140/km^{2} (370/sq mi)
- Time zone: UTC+1 (CET)
  - Summer (DST): UTC+2 (CEST)

Lovrečan is a village in Varaždin County of northern Croatia.
