= Vidovec, Varaždin County =

Village and municipality of Croatia

Vidovec
- Location within Croatia
- Coordinates: 46°16′59.88″N 16°14′27.96″E
- Country: Croatia
- County: Varaždin County

Area
  - Total: 32.1 km^{2} (12.4 sq mi)

Population (2021)
  - Total: 4,915
  - Density: 153/km^{2} (397/sq mi)
- Time zone: UTC+1 (CET)
  - Summer (DST): UTC+2 (CEST)
- Website: vidovec.hr

Vidovec is a village and municipality in Croatia in Varaždin County.

The 2011 census recorded 5,425 inhabitants in the municipality, in the following settlements:

- Budislavec, population 220
- Cargovec, population 410
- Domitrovec, population 272
- Krkanec, population 305
- Nedeljanec, population 1,485
- Papinec, population 110
- Prekno, population 172
- Šijanec, population 213
- Tužno, population 1,015
- Vidovec, population 851
- Zamlača, population 372

The absolute majority of the population are Croats.
