= Kanizsa =

Kanizsa may refer to:

- Nagykanizsa, a town in Hungary
  - Kanije Province, Ottoman Empire
  - Captaincy of Kanizsa, military district in the Kingdom of Hungary
- Kanizsamonostor, or Banatski Monoštor, Serbia
- Magyarkanizsa, the Hungarian name for Kanjiža town, Vojvodina, Serbia
- Szörénykanizsa, the Hungarian name for Cănicea village, Domașnea Commune, Caraș-Severin County, Romania
- Törökkanizsa, the Hungarian name for Novi Kneževac town, Vojvodina, Serbia

== People with the surname ==
- Gaetano Kanizsa (1913–1993), Hungarian-Italian psychologist and artist
- Gina Kanizsa (born 1988), Hungarian jazz singer
- Tivadar Kanizsa (1933–1975), Hungarian water polo player

== See also ==
- Kaniža (disambiguation)
