= Maruševec Castle =

Castle in northern Croatia built in 1547

Coordinates: 46°16′20″N 16°11′19″E

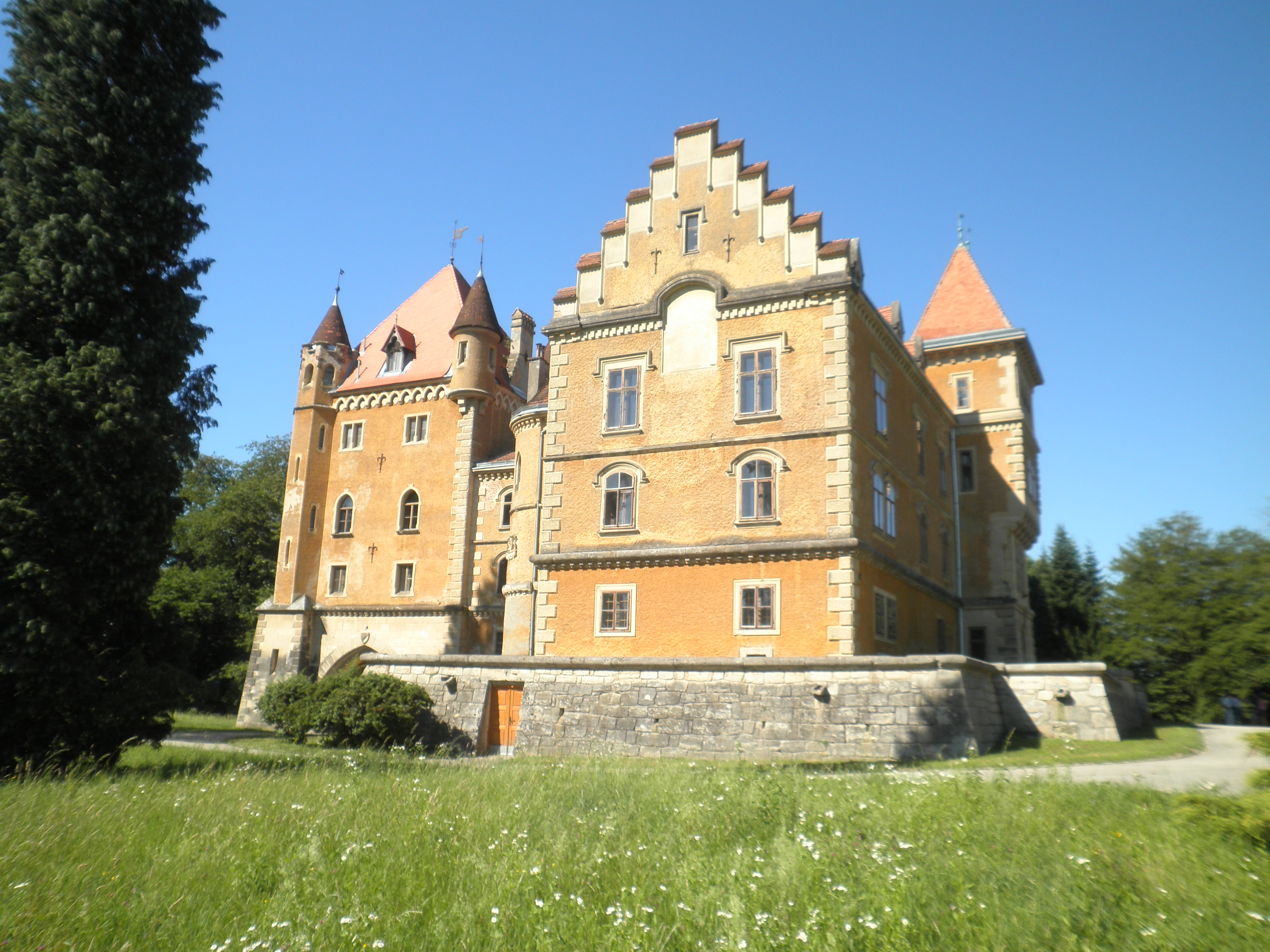
Maruševec Castle

Maruševec is a castle located in the municipality of the same name within Varaždin County, Croatia. The castle dates back to 1547.

== History ==
Throughout the mid 19th century, again the castle was under numerous hands, until it was bought by Arthur Schlippenbach. He enlarged the castle as it stands today and refurbished it with decor of the period in 1877. In 1881, Count Schlippenbach died in Cairo.

In 1883 Maruševec and Čalinec Castle were purchased by Oskar de Pongratz. The Pongratz noble family reconstructed the garden upon the plans of the Swedish architect Carl Gustav Swensson, and made some minor alterations to the building in 1901 such as tapestries on the staircases illustrating hunting scenes, the work of Monnaccelli from Rome. The castle was owned by the Pongratz noble family until 1945. That year the Independent State of Croatia was defeated, resulting in the establishment of communist-run Yugoslavia which confiscated most of the former Austro-Hungarian Croatian nobility's property. As part of this, Maruševec was nationalized and the Pongratz's emigrated to Graz, Austria.

In the 2000s, the government of Croatia began the process of returning the property to the heir of the Pongratz family, count Oskar Pontgratz. It is now in their ownership.

== Literature ==
- Obad Šćitaroci, Mladen; Bojanić Obad Šćitaroci, Bojana; Dundović, Boris (2013). "Manors and Gardens in Northern Croatia in the Age of Historicism" (PDF). Centropa. pp. 175–186. ISSN 1532-5563. Archived from the original (PDF) on 2025-05-05.
