= Klenovnik Castle =

Castle in Croatia

Coordinates: 46°16′22″N 16°4′36″E

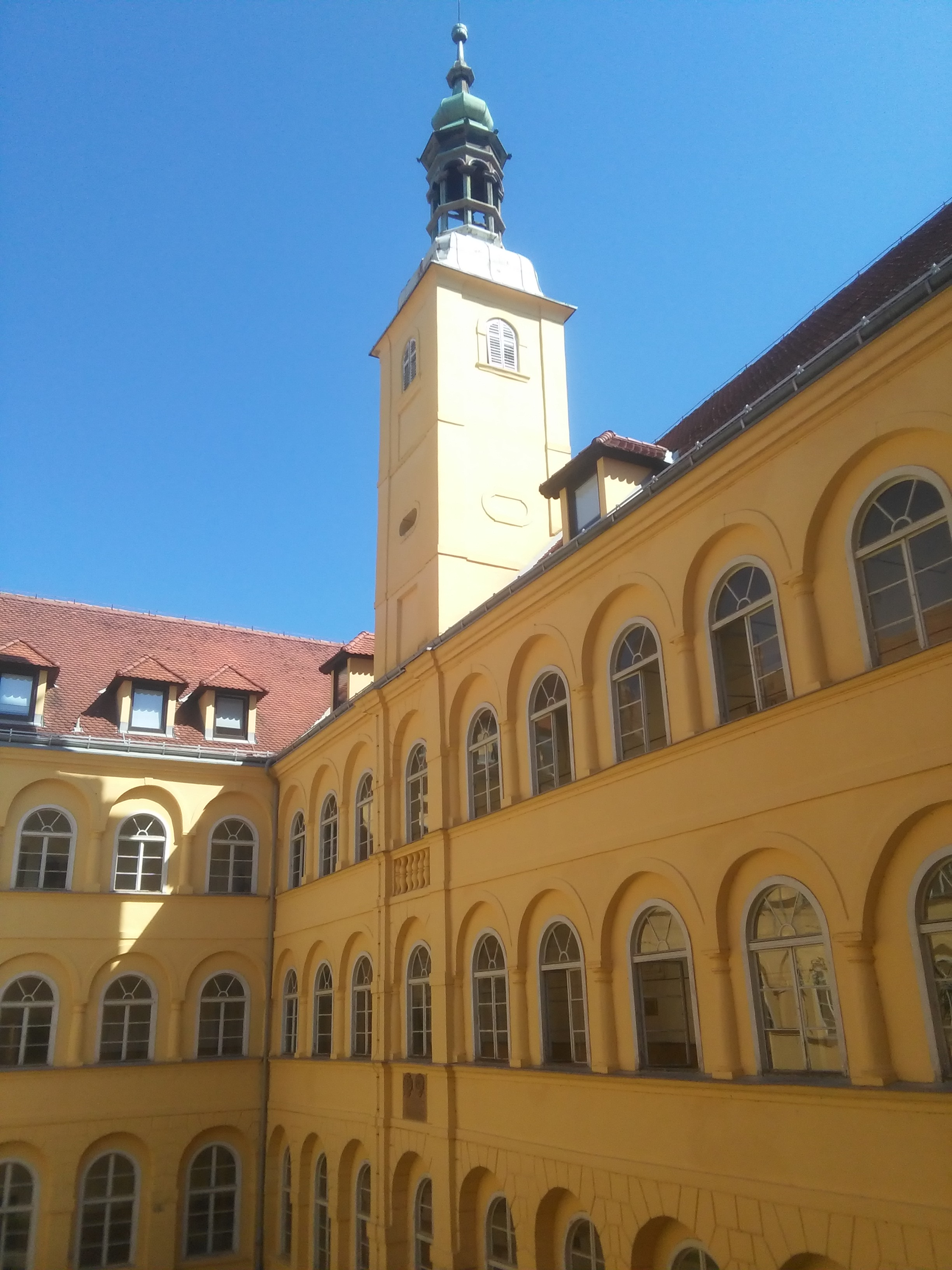
Courtyard of Klenovnik castle, Varaždin County, Republic of Croatia

Klenovnik Castle (Croatian: Dvorac Klenovnik) is the largest Croatian castle. It is situated in Klenovnik, Varaždin County.

== History ==
The first mention of the castle dates back to the 13th century when the Hungarian-Croatian king Béla IV takes it away from Pochun and gives it to then ruler of town Varaždin. In the late 17th century, king Maksimilijan sells this castle for 20 000 forint to Croatian nobleman Gašpar I Drašković (1530-1591).

In 1850, Juraj VI Drašković sold Klenovnik Castle to raise funds for the expensive renovation of Trakošćan Castle. The castle was purchased by Baron Bruck, the Austrian Minister of Finance at the time.

Baron Bruck's successors sold the manor, including its lake and park, to the Paradiž family in 1881. The Paradiž family owned and maintained the estate for over four decades until 1922.

In 1922, the castle was purchased by Count Ivan Bombelles, who became the last private owner of Klenovnik. In 1925, Count Bombelles sold the castle with some surrounding land to the Central Office for Workers' Insurance in Zagreb. In 1927, the converted palace opened as a sanatorium for sick workers, establishing a tuberculosis hospital that became one of the best-equipped facilities in the newly formed Kingdom of Yugoslavia. The hospital continued to operate during the Independent State of Croatia period and after World War II, when it was formally renamed the Klenovnik Hospital for Lung Diseases and Tuberculosis.
