= Radovan, Croatia =

Radovan
- Village
- Location within Croatia
- Coordinates: 46°13′51.57″N 16°14′49.94″E
- Country: Croatia
- County: Varaždin County
- Municipality: Ivanec

Population (2011)
  - Total: 372
- Time zone: UTC+1 (CET)
  - Summer (DST): UTC+2 (CEST)

Radovan is a village in Varaždin County, in northern Croatia.
