= Muričevec =

Coordinates: 46°12′18″N 16°01′12″E

- Village
- Interactive map of Muričevec
- Country: Croatia
- County: Varaždin County
- Town: Lepoglava

Area
  - Total: 0.9 km^{2} (0.35 sq mi)

Population (2021)
  - Total: 147
  - Density: 160/km^{2} (420/sq mi)
- Time zone: UTC+1 (CET)
  - Summer (DST): UTC+2 (CEST)

Muričevec is a village of the town of Lepoglava, Varaždin County, in northern Croatia. It is connected by the D35 highway.
