= Donja Šemnica =

Coordinates: 46°07′08″N 15°55′37″E

- Village
- Interactive map of Donja Šemnica
- Country: Croatia
- County: Krapina-Zagorje County

Area
  - Total: 6.2 km^{2} (2.4 sq mi)

Population (2021)
  - Total: 797
  - Density: 130/km^{2} (330/sq mi)
- Time zone: UTC+1 (CET)
  - Summer (DST): UTC+2 (CEST)

Donja Šemnica is a village in Croatia. It is connected by the D35 highway.
