= Punikve =

- Village
- Location of Punikve in Croatia
- Coordinates: 46°14′24″N 16°12′00″E
- Country: Croatia
- County: Varaždin County
- Town: Ivanec

Area
  - Total: 2.1 km^{2} (0.81 sq mi)

Population (2021)
  - Total: 418
  - Density: 200/km^{2} (520/sq mi)
- Time zone: UTC+1 (CET)
  - Summer (DST): UTC+2 (CEST)
- Postal code: 42240 Ivanec
- Area code: +385 (0)42

Punikve is a village in Croatia. It is a settlement of Ivanec town.

== Geography ==
Punikve is around 1.25 km^{2}.

== Residents ==
According to the 2021 population census, there were 418 residents in Punikve.

== History ==
- Stjepan Vuković (archaeologist)
