= Kaniža, Varaždin County =

Kaniža
- Village
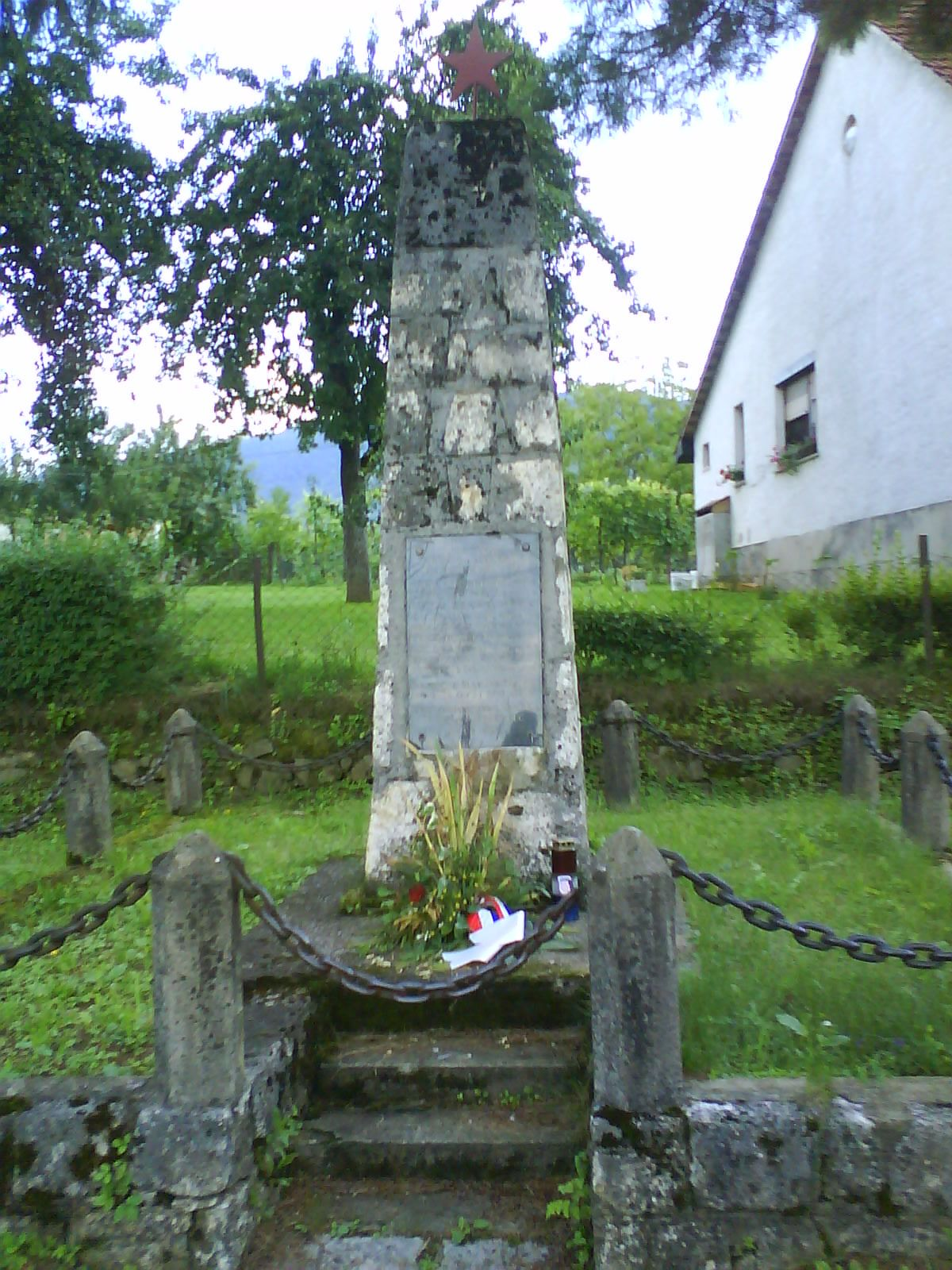
- Interactive map of Kaniža
- Coordinates: 46.22°N 16.09°E
- Country: Croatia
- County: Varaždin County
- Municipality: Ivanec

Area
  - Total: 3.0 km^{2} (1.2 sq mi)

Population (2021)
  - Total: 234
  - Density: 78/km^{2} (200/sq mi)

Kaniža is a village in Croatia. It is connected by the D35 highway.
