= Greda, Varaždin County =

Coordinates: 46°16′34″N 16°12′29″E

Greda
- Village
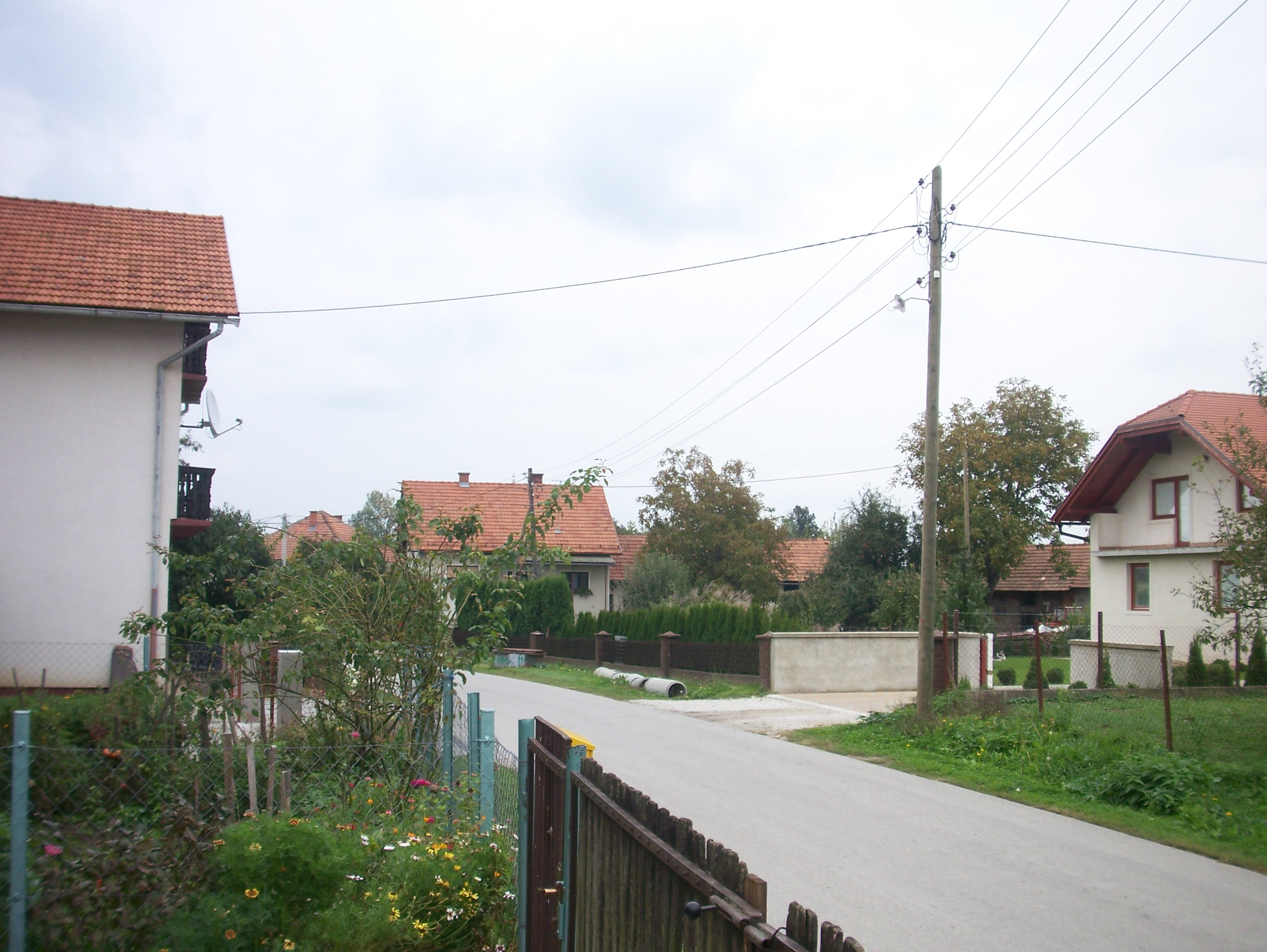
- Street of Greda, Varaždin County
- Interactive map of Greda
- Country: Croatia

Area
  - Total: 2.2 km^{2} (0.85 sq mi)

Population (2021)
  - Total: 507
  - Density: 230/km^{2} (600/sq mi)
- Time zone: UTC+1 (CET)
  - Summer (DST): UTC+2 (CEST)

Greda is a village in Croatia. It is connected by the D35 highway.
