= Sutinske Toplice =

Coordinates: 46°06′50″N 16°00′32″E

- Village
- Interactive map of Sutinske Toplice
- Country: Croatia
- County: Krapina-Zagorje County
- Municipality: Mihovljan

Area
  - Total: 0.2 km^{2} (0.077 sq mi)

Population (2021)
  - Total: 0
  - Density: 0.0/km^{2} (0.0/sq mi)
- Time zone: UTC+1 (CET)
  - Summer (DST): UTC+2 (CEST)

Sutinske Toplice is an uninhabited settlement and a thermal spa in Mihovljan municipality, Croatia. It is located on the southern slopes of the Ivanščica mountain near the town of Zlatar.

The spa has been famous since the late 18th century for the healing properties of its water. According to research, the water of this spa helps in the treatment and rehabilitation of rheumatic, cardiovascular and musculoskeletal diseases.

== History ==
The first time documents mention Sutinsko was in 1258 under the name "land of Zotischa", which belonged to Castrum Zagoria. After changing several owners, in 1745 Sutinsko came into the ownership of Count Petar Troilo Sermage through marriage. The physician Lalangue mentioned the spa in 1779 as suitable for treating women's diseases, rheumatism, urinary organs, and mental illnesses. In 1893, the government of the Kingdom of Croatia and Slavonia officially declared the water medicinal, and the spring a health resort.

== Demographics ==
The settlement currently has no permanent residents.

Sutinske Toplice: Population trends 1857–2021
v

population		12		7	4		30		4	1		2
	1857	1869	1880	1890	1900	1910	1921	1931	1948	1953	1961	1971	1981	1991	2001	2011	2021

Sources: Croatian Bureau of Statistics publications

== Bibliography ==
- Matoničkin, Ivo (1957). "Ekološka istraživanja faune termalnih voda Hrvatskog Zagorja" [Ecological Investigations of the Fauna of the Hot Springs of Hrvatsko Zagorje]. Rad Jugoslavenske akademije znanosti i umjetnosti. Odjel za prirodne nauke (in Serbo-Croatian). 733: 139–205. ISSN 1330-5697.
- Vouk, Vale (1916). "Biološka istraživanja termalnih voda Hrvatskoga zagorja" [Biological Explorations of the Hot Springs of Hrvatsko Zagorje]. Prirodoslovna istraživanja Hrvatske i Slavonije (in Serbo-Croatian). 8: 1–17. ISSN 1333-2325.
