= Jurketinec =

Village in Varaždin, Croatia

Coordinates: 46°16′52″N 16°13′08″E

- Village
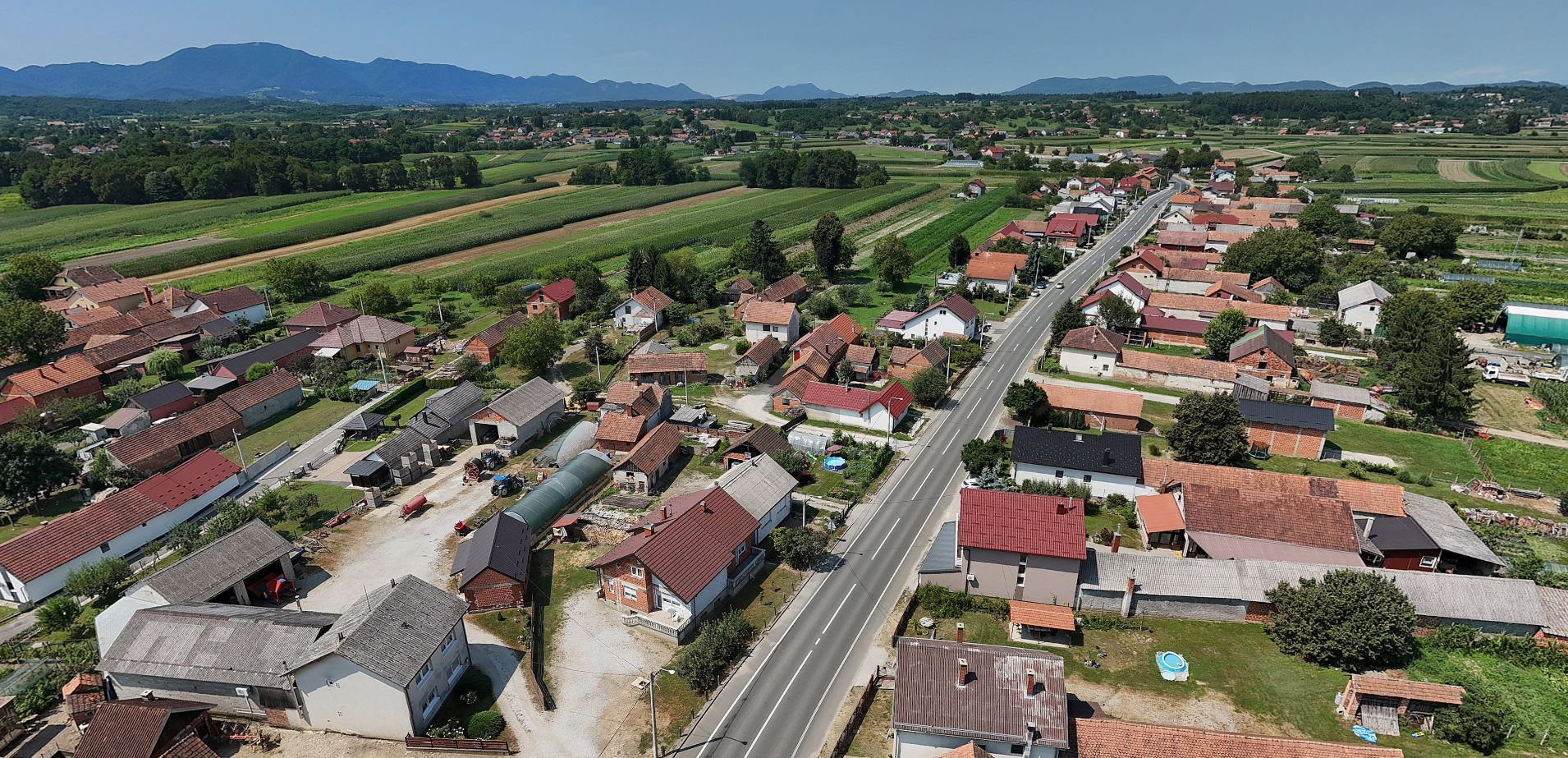
- Interactive map of Jurketinec
- Country: Croatia
- County: Varaždin County

Area
  - Total: 2.5 sq mi (6.4 km^{2})

Population (2021)
  - Total: 387
  - Density: 160/sq mi (60/km^{2})
- Time zone: UTC+1 (CET)
  - Summer (DST): UTC+2 (CEST)

Jurketinec is a village in Croatia. It is connected by the D35 highway.
