= Dubravec =

- Village
- Location within Croatia
- Coordinates: 46.249528°N 16.080013°E
- Country: Croatia
- County: Varaždin County
- Municipality: Klenovnik

Area
  - Total: 5.1 km^{2} (2.0 sq mi)

Population (2021)
  - Total: 360
  - Density: 71/km^{2} (180/sq mi)
- Time zone: UTC+1 (CET)
  - Summer (DST): UTC+2 (CEST)

Dubravec is a village in Croatia.
