= Črešnjevo =

- Village
- Location of Črešnjevo in Croatia
- Coordinates: 46°15′18″N 16°16′19″E
- Country: Croatia
- County: Varaždin County
- Municipality: Beretinec

Area
  - Total: 4.4 km^{2} (1.7 sq mi)

Population (2021)
  - Total: 707
  - Density: 160/km^{2} (420/sq mi)
- Time zone: UTC+1 (CET)
  - Summer (DST): UTC+2 (CEST)
- Postal code: 42204 Turčin
- Area code: +385 (0)42

Črešnjevo is a village in Croatia.

== Literature ==
- Obad Šćitaroci, Mladen; Bojanić Obad Šćitaroci, Bojana; Dundović, Boris (2013). "Manors and Gardens in Northern Croatia in the Age of Historicism" (PDF). Centropa. pp. 175–186. ISSN 1532-5563. See page 178.
