= Jerovec =

Coordinates: 46°14′N 16°07′E

- Village
- Interactive map of Jerovec
- Country: Croatia
- County: Varaždin County
- Town: Ivanec

Area
  - Total: 3.6 km^{2} (1.4 sq mi)

Population (2021)
  - Total: 760
  - Density: 210/km^{2} (550/sq mi)
- Time zone: UTC+1 (CET)
  - Summer (DST): UTC+2 (CEST)

Jerovec is a village in northern Croatia.
