= Tužno =

Coordinates: 46°15′N 16°14′E

- Village
- Interactive map of Tužno
- Country: Croatia
- County: Varaždin County
- Municipality: Vidovec

Area
  - Total: 4.9 km^{2} (1.9 sq mi)

Population (2021)
  - Total: 910
  - Density: 190/km^{2} (480/sq mi)
- Time zone: UTC+1 (CET)
  - Summer (DST): UTC+2 (CEST)

Tužno is a village in Croatia.
