= Pongratz =

Pongratz or Pongrátz is a German-language surname. It stems from the male given name Pancras. Notable people with the name include:

- Anton Pongratz (1948–2008), Romanian fencer
- Erzsébet Vasvári-Pongrátz (1954–2022), Hungarian sports shooter
- Gergely Pongrátz (1932–2005), Hungarian anti-communist
- Lothar Pongratz (1952–2013), German bobsledder
- Oliver Pongratz (born 1973), a German former badminton player
- Ștefan Pongratz (born 1930), Romanian rower
