= Nedeljanec =

Coordinates: 46°17′N 16°17′E

- Village
- Interactive map of Nedeljanec
- Country: Croatia
- County: Varaždin County
- Municipality: Vidovec

Area
  - Total: 6.7 km^{2} (2.6 sq mi)

Population (2021)
  - Total: 1,320
  - Density: 200/km^{2} (510/sq mi)
- Time zone: UTC+1 (CET)
  - Summer (DST): UTC+2 (CEST)

Nedeljanec is a village in Croatia. It is connected by the D2 highway.
