= Kuzminec, Krapina-Zagorje County =

Coordinates: 46°09′36″N 15°57′36″E

Kuzminec
- Village
- Interactive map of Kuzminec
- Country: Croatia
- County: Krapina-Zagorje County
- Municipality: Mihovljan

Area
  - Total: 3.3 km^{2} (1.3 sq mi)

Population (2021)
  - Total: 338
  - Density: 100/km^{2} (270/sq mi)
- Time zone: UTC+1 (CET)
  - Summer (DST): UTC+2 (CEST)

Kuzminec is a village in Croatia. It is connected by the D35 highway.
