= Beretinec =

- Municipality
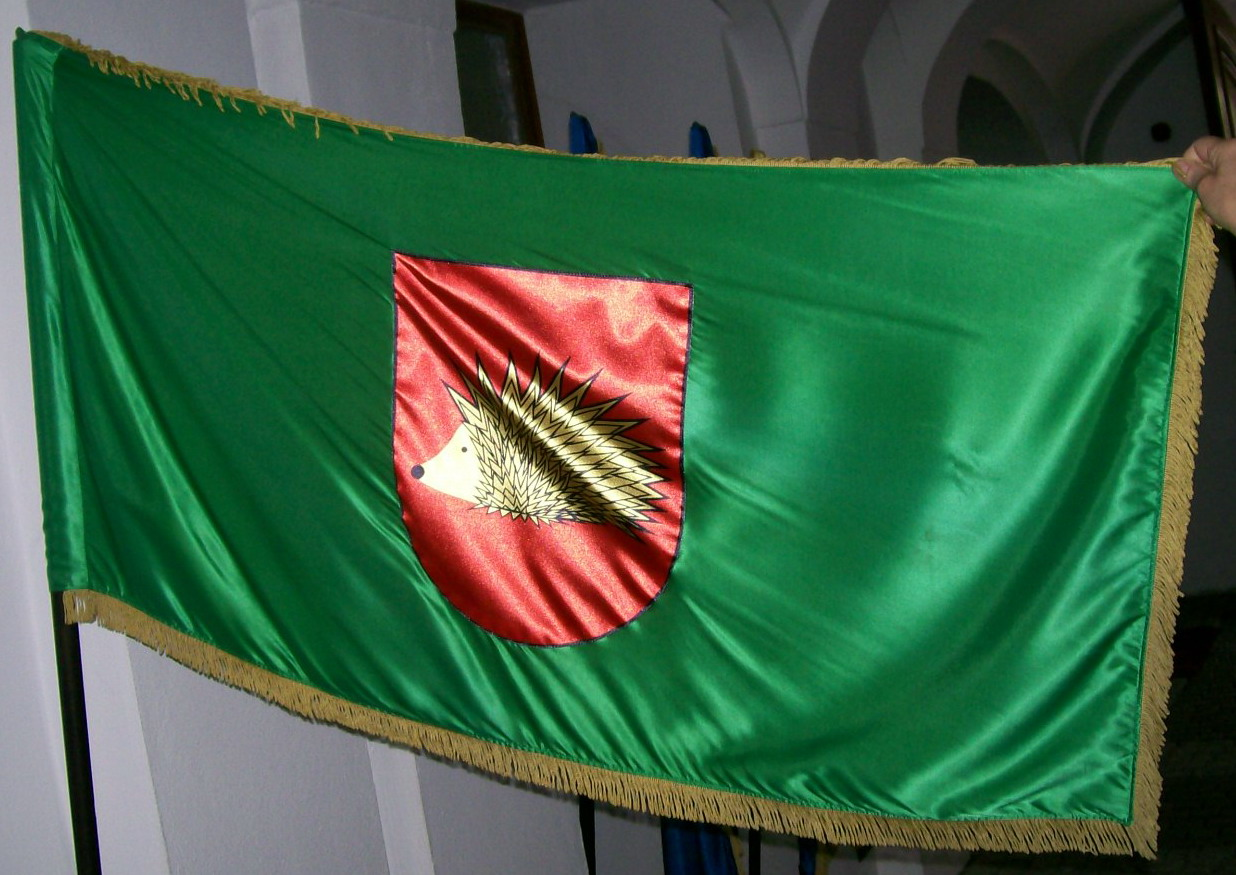
- Flag
- Interactive map of Beretinec
- Location of Beretinec in Croatia
- Coordinates: 46°14′55″N 16°18′22″E
- Country: Croatia
- County: Varaždin County

Government
  - Municipal mayor: Nikola Žganec (HNS)

Area
  - Municipality: 12.3 km^{2} (4.7 sq mi)
  - Urban: 5.3 km^{2} (2.0 sq mi)

Population (2021)
  - Municipality: 2,049
  - Density: 167/km^{2} (431/sq mi)
  - Urban: 988
  - Urban density: 190/km^{2} (480/sq mi)
- Time zone: UTC+1 (CET)
  - Summer (DST): UTC+2 (CEST)
- Postal code: 42204 Turčin
- Area code: +385 (0)42
- Website: www.beretinec.hr

Beretinec is a village and municipality in Croatia in Varaždin County.

== Demographics ==
In the 2021 census, the municipality had a population of 2,049 in the following settlements:

- Beretinec, population 988
- Črešnjevo, population 707
- Ledinec, population 175
- Ledinec Gornji, population 179

The majority of inhabitants are Croats, making up 98.93% of the population.

Beretinec: Population trends 1857–2021
v

population	844	957	1051	1203	1327	1533	1493	1777	2164	2173	2190	2198	2171	2239	2288	2176	2049
	1857	1869	1880	1890	1900	1910	1921	1931	1948	1953	1961	1971	1981	1991	2001	2011	2021

Sources: Croatian Bureau of Statistics publications

== Administration ==
The current municipal mayor of Beretinec is Nikola Žganec (HNS) and the Beretinec Municipal Council consists of 9 seats.

Groups	Councilors per group
HNS-HSS-SDP-HSU	7 / 9
HDZ	2 / 9

== Culture ==
There are currently 7 associations operating in the Municipality of Beretinec:

- VFD Beretinec
- Trčka Hunting Society
- Minifootball club Črešnjevo
- FC Beretinec
- Cultural and artistic society "Ježek"
- Association of winegrowers and fruit growers of Beretinec Municipality "VIV-BER"
- Volleyball club Beretinec
