= Lipovník, Topoľčany District =

Municipality in Slovakia

Lipovník district Topoľčany Lipovnok
- Municipality
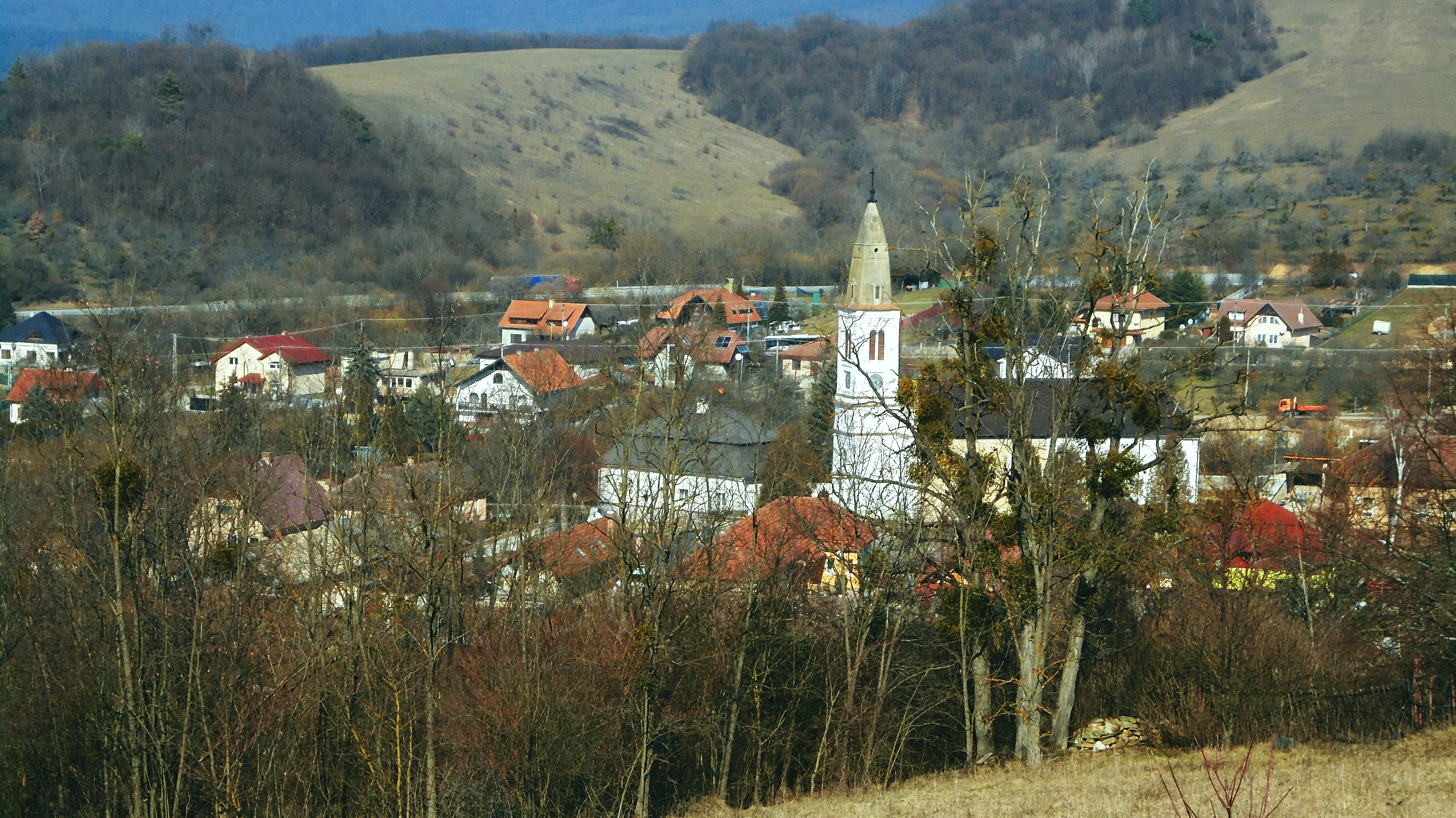

- Flag

- Location of Lipovník district Topoľčany in the Nitra Region Location of Lipovník district Topoľčany in Slovakia
- Coordinates: 48.57°N 18.01°E
- Country: Slovakia
- Region: Nitra Region
- District: Topoľčany District
- First mentioned: 1283

Area
  - Total: 6.44 km^{2} (2.49 sq mi)
- Elevation: 262 m (860 ft)

Population (2025)
  - Total: 311
- Time zone: UTC+1 (CET)
  - Summer (DST): UTC+2 (CEST)
- Postal code: 956 01
- Area code: +421 38
- Vehicle registration plate (until 2022): TO
- Website: www.obeclipovnik.sk

Lipovník (Hungarian: Lipovnok) is a municipality in the Topoľčany District of the Nitra Region, Slovakia. In 2011 it had 326 inhabitants.

== Population ==
Population statistic (10 years)
Year	1995	2005	2015	2025
Count	341	336	330	311
Difference		−1.46%	−1.78%	−5.75%

Population statistic
Year	2024	2025
Count	309	311
Difference		+0.64%

It has a population of 311 people (31 December 2025).

=== Ethnicity ===
Census 2021 (1+ %)
Ethnicity	Number	Fraction
Slovak	309	98.09%
Not found out	7	2.22%
Total	315	

In year 2021 was 315 people by ethnicity 309 as Slovak, 7 as Not found out, 2 as Hungarian, 1 as Czech, 1 as Romani and 1 as Romanian.

Note on population: The difference values of population numbers in the table "Population statistic" and in the sections "Ethnicity" & "Religion" is caused by the use of various statistical methods.

=== Religion ===
Census 2021 (1+ %)
Religion	Number	Fraction
Roman Catholic Church	271	86.03%
None	31	9.84%
Evangelical Church	6	1.9%
Total	315	

In year 2021 was 315 people by religion 271 from Roman Catholic Church, 31 from None, 6 from Evangelical Church, 2 from Not found out, 2 from Christian Congregations in Slovakia, 2 from Ad hoc movements and 1 from Greek Catholic Church.
