= Lipovník, Rožňava District =

Village in the Košice Region of Slovakia

Lipovník Hárskút
- Municipality
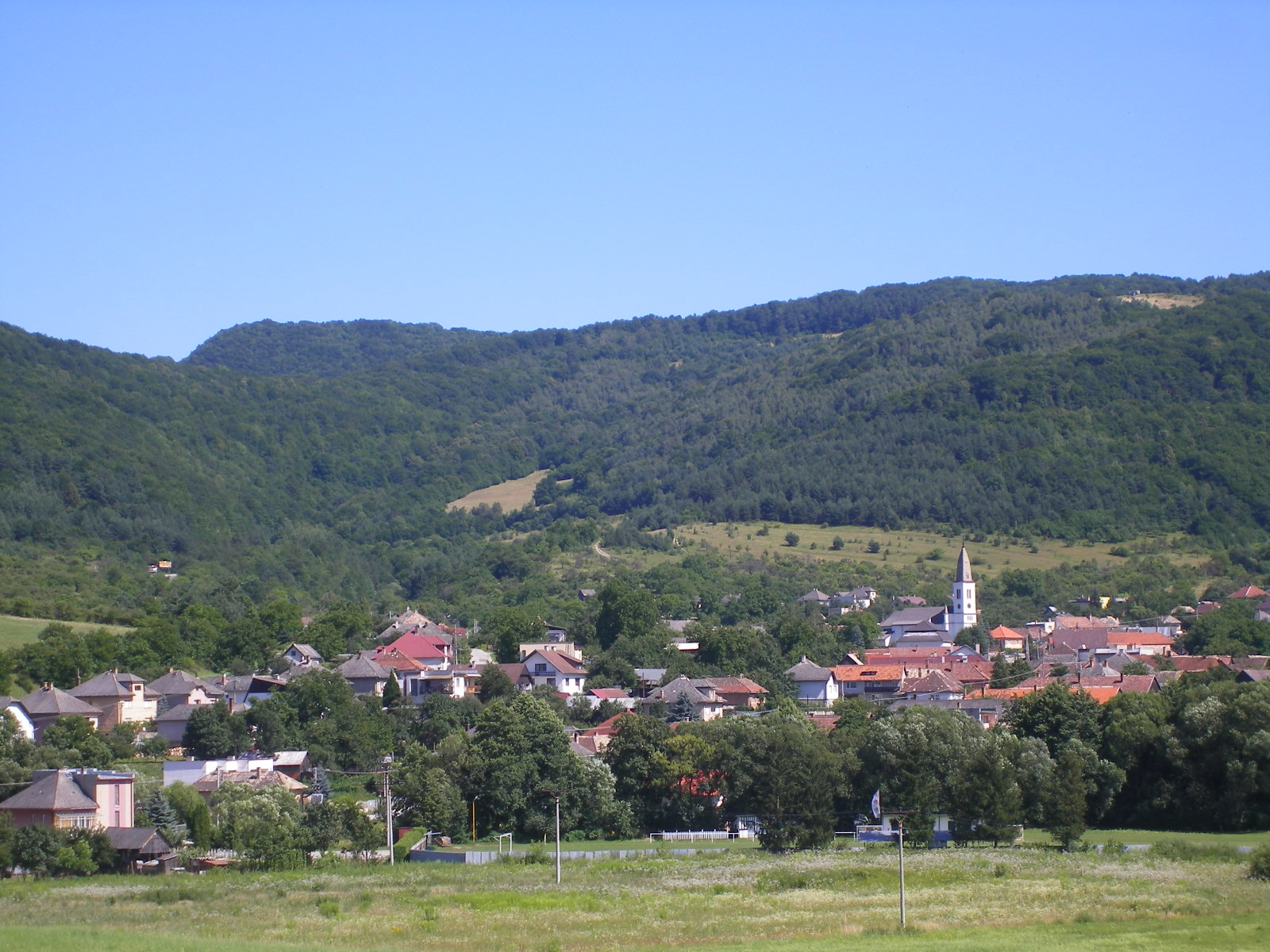

- Flag

- Location of Lipovník in the Košice Region Location of Lipovník in Slovakia
- Coordinates: 48.63°N 20.62°E
- Country: Slovakia
- Region: Košice Region
- District: Rožňava District
- First mentioned: 1364

Area
  - Total: 12.72 km^{2} (4.91 sq mi)
- Elevation: 360 m (1,180 ft)

Population (2025)
  - Total: 508
- Time zone: UTC+1 (CET)
  - Summer (DST): UTC+2 (CEST)
- Postal code: 494 2
- Area code: +421 58
- Vehicle registration plate (until 2022): RV
- Website: www.obeclipovnik.sk

Lipovník (Hungarian: Hárskút) is a village and municipality in the Rožňava District in the Košice Region of middle-eastern Slovakia.

== History ==
In historical records the village was first mentioned in 1364. Before the establishment of independent Czechoslovakia in 1918, Lipovník was part of Gömör and Kishont County within the Kingdom of Hungary. From 1938 to 1945, it was again part of Hungary as a result of the First Vienna Award.

== Geography ==
The municipality lies at an altitude of 360 metres (1,180 ft) and covers an area of 12.72 km^{2} (4.91 sq mi) (2025).

== Population ==
Population statistic (10 years)
Year	1995	2005	2015	2025
Count	544	507	499	508
Difference		−6.80%	−1.57%	+1.80%

Population statistic
Year	2024	2025
Count	509	508
Difference		−0.19%

It has a population of 508 people (31 December 2025).

=== Ethnicity ===
Census 2021 (1+ %)
Ethnicity	Number	Fraction
Hungarian	383	71.32%
Slovak	199	37.05%
Not found out	7	1.3%
Total	537	

In year 2021 was 537 people by ethnicity 383 as Hungarian, 199 as Slovak, 7 as Not found out, 5 as Other, 3 as Czech, 3 as Rusyn, 1 as Jewish, 1 as Ukrainian, 1 as Romani and 1 as Polish.

Note on population: The difference values of population numbers in the table "Population statistic" and in the sections "Ethnicity" & "Religion" is caused by the use of various statistical methods.

=== Religion ===
Census 2021 (1+ %)
Religion	Number	Fraction
Roman Catholic Church	359	66.85%
None	96	17.88%
Calvinist Church	33	6.15%
Greek Catholic Church	16	2.98%
Evangelical Church	15	2.79%
Not found out	8	1.49%
Total	537	

In year 2021 was 537 people by religion 359 from Roman Catholic Church, 96 from None, 33 from Calvinist Church, 16 from Greek Catholic Church, 15 from Evangelical Church, 8 from Not found out, 3 from Apostolic Church, 2 from Ad hoc movements, 1 from Old Catholic Church, 1 from Other and not ascertained christian church, 1 from Jehovah's Witnesses, 1 from Islam and 1 from United Methodist Church.

== Culture ==
The village has a public library and a football pitch.
