= Salinovec =

- Village
- Location in Croatia
- Coordinates: 46°13′35″N 16°09′50″E
- Country: Croatia
- County: Varaždin County

Area
  - Total: 4.7 km^{2} (1.8 sq mi)

Population (2021)
  - Total: 466
  - Density: 99/km^{2} (260/sq mi)
- Time zone: UTC+1 (CET)
  - Summer (DST): UTC+2 (CEST)

Salinovec is a village in northern Croatia.
