= Koškovec =

Coordinates: 46°14′53″N 16°09′54″E

- Village
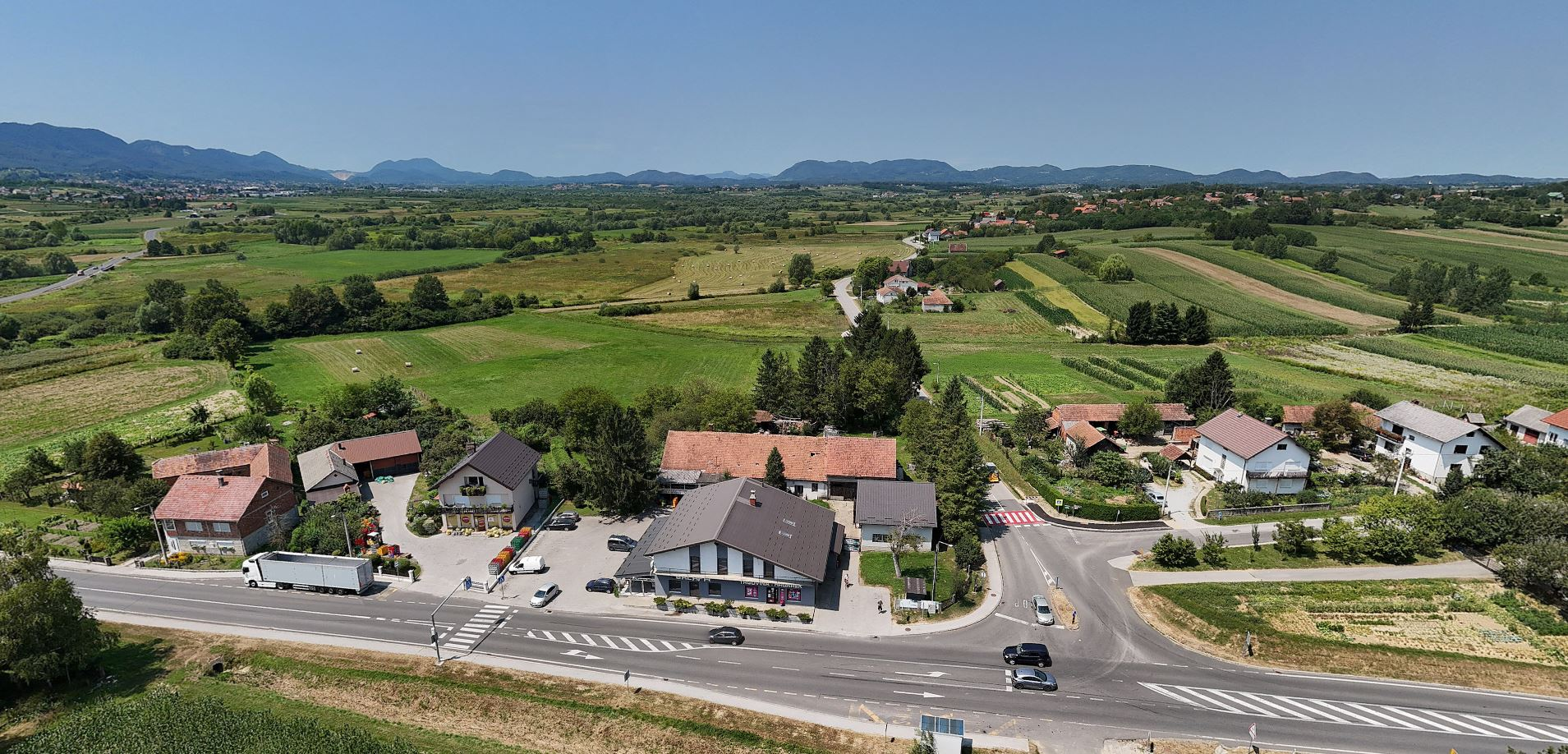
- Interactive map of Koškovec
- Country: Croatia
- County: Varaždin County

Area
  - Total: 2.4 km^{2} (0.93 sq mi)

Population (2021)
  - Total: 206
  - Density: 86/km^{2} (220/sq mi)
- Time zone: UTC+1 (CET)
  - Summer (DST): UTC+2 (CEST)

Koškovec is a village in Croatia.
