= Krkanec =

Coordinates: 46°16′50″N 16°15′30″E

- Village
- Interactive map of Krkanec
- Country: Croatia
- County: Varaždin County

Area
  - Total: 2.4 km^{2} (0.93 sq mi)

Population (2021)
  - Total: 287
  - Density: 120/km^{2} (310/sq mi)
- Time zone: UTC+1 (CET)
  - Summer (DST): UTC+2 (CEST)

Krkanec is a village in Croatia.
