= Biljevec =

Coordinates: 46°17′10″N 16°11′53″E

- Village
- Interactive map of Biljevec
- Country: Croatia
- County: Varaždin County

Area
  - Total: 1.8 km^{2} (0.69 sq mi)

Population (2021)
  - Total: 219
  - Density: 120/km^{2} (320/sq mi)
- Time zone: UTC+1 (CET)
  - Summer (DST): UTC+2 (CEST)

Biljevec is a village in Croatia.
