= Bedenec =

Coordinates: 46°14′N 16°04′E

- Village
- Interactive map of Bedenec
- Country: Croatia
- County: Varaždin County

Area
  - Total: 7.1 km^{2} (2.7 sq mi)

Population (2021)
  - Total: 600
  - Density: 85/km^{2} (220/sq mi)
- Time zone: UTC+1 (CET)
  - Summer (DST): UTC+2 (CEST)

Bedenec is a village located in the northern Varaždin County region of Croatia. The village is approximately 10km from the Slovenian border.
