= Mihovljan, Krapina-Zagorje County =

Mihovljan
- Location within Croatia
- Coordinates: 46°7′48″N 15°58′12″E
- Country: Croatia
- County: Krapina-Zagorje County

Government
  - Mayor: Zlatko Bartolić (HDZ)

Area
  - Total: 26.2 km^{2} (10.1 sq mi)

Population (2021)
  - Total: 1,677
  - Density: 64.0/km^{2} (166/sq mi)
- Time zone: UTC+1 (CET)
  - Summer (DST): UTC+2 (CEST)
- Website: mihovljan.hr

Mihovljan is a village and municipality in the Krapina-Zagorje County, northern Croatia.

== History ==
The parish of Mihovljan was first mentioned in the 13th century as the parish church of St. Michael the Archangel. It was destroyed in World War II, and a new church was built on the same site in 1972.

The oldest surnames from Mihovljan are found in church books, the oldest of which is the "Protocoli baptistatorum" (Baptism Register), which began to be kept in the parish of Mihovljan in 1733. These books provide reliable information about surnames in the parish over the last three centuries.

== Demographics ==
In the 2021 census, the area had a total population of 1,677 in the following settlements:

- Frkuljevec Mihovljanski, population 80
- Gregurovec, population 303
- Kuzminec, population 338
- Mihovljan, population 956
- Sutinske Toplice, no population

In the same census, an absolute majority of the inhabitants were Croats at 99.52%.

Mihovljan: Population trends 1857–2021
v

population	2160	2290	2552	2806	3236	3532	3544	3852	4057	4102	3705	3258	2763	2474	2234	1938	1677
	1857	1869	1880	1890	1900	1910	1921	1931	1948	1953	1961	1971	1981	1991	2001	2011	2021

Sources: Croatian Bureau of Statistics publications

== Administration ==
The current mayor of Mihovljan is Zlatko Bartolić (HDZ) and the Mihovljan Municipal Council consists of 9 seats.

Groups	Councilors per group
HDZ-HSS	5 / 9
SDP-HSU	4 / 9
