= Pece, Varaždin County =

Pece
- Village
- Location within Croatia
- Coordinates: 46°13′N 16°15′E
- Country: Croatia
- County: Varaždin County
- Municipality: Ivanec

Area
  - Total: 1.6 km^{2} (0.62 sq mi)

Population (2021)
  - Total: 79
  - Density: 49/km^{2} (130/sq mi)
- Time zone: UTC+1 (CET)
  - Summer (DST): UTC+2 (CEST)

Pece is a village in Varaždin County, in northern Croatia.
