= Klenovnik, Croatia =

Klenovnik
- Location within Croatia
- Coordinates: 46°16′12″N 16°4′12″E
- Country: Croatia
- County: Varaždin County

Area
  - Total: 25.7 km^{2} (9.9 sq mi)

Population (2021)
  - Total: 1,793
  - Density: 69.8/km^{2} (181/sq mi)
- Time zone: UTC+1 (CET)
  - Summer (DST): UTC+2 (CEST)
- Website: klenovnik.hr

Klenovnik is a village and municipality in Croatia in Varaždin County.

In the 2011 census, there were 2,278 inhabitants, in the following settlements:

- Dubravec, population 428
- Goranec, population 21
- Klenovnik, population 982
- Lipovnik, population 373
- Plemenšćina, population 109
- Vukovoj, population 109

In the same census, the absolute majority were Croats.

It is known for Klenovnik Castle.
