= Diocletian's Palace =

Historical Complex of Split with the Palace of Diocletian
- Povijesna jezgra grada Splita s Dioklecijanovom palačom (Croatian); Palatium Diocletiani (Latin)
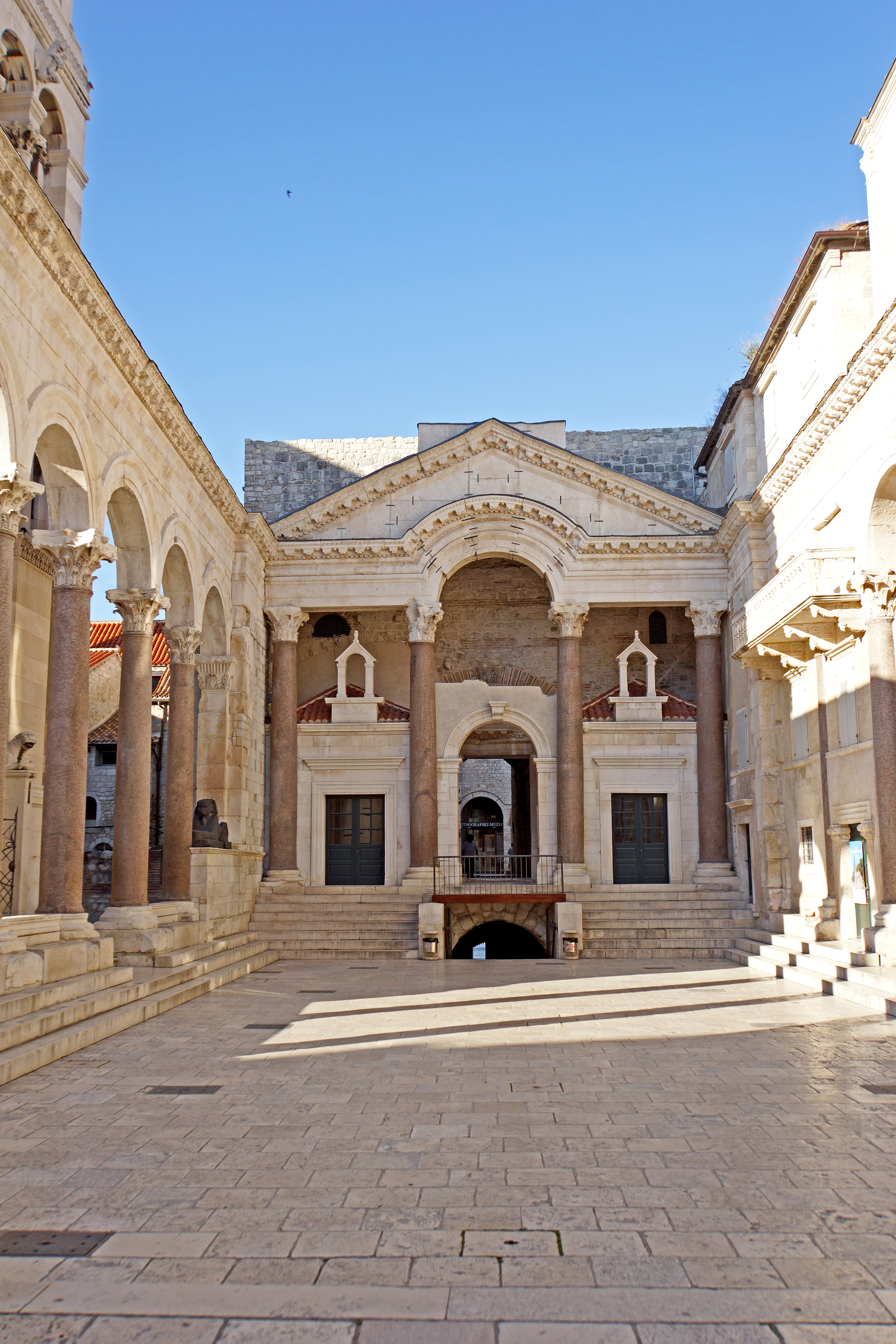
- View of the Peristyle (the central square within the Palace) towards the entrance of Diocletian's quarters

- Location within Croatia
- Interactive map of Historical Complex of Split with the Palace of Diocletian
- 43°30′30″N 16°26′24″E
- Location: Split, Croatia

History
- Built: 4th century AD

UNESCO World Heritage Site
- Type: Cultural
- Criteria: ii, iii, iv
- Designated: 1979 (3rd Session)
- Reference no.: 97
- Region: Europe

Cultural Good of Croatia
- Official name: Dioklecijanova palača

Diocletian's Palace (Croatian: Dioklecijanova palača, pronounced [diokletsijǎːnova pǎlatʃa]; Latin: Palatium Diocletiani) is an ancient Roman palace and fortress complex in Split, Croatia. It was built at the end of the third century AD by the Roman Emperor Diocletian as his retirement residence. About half of the complex was for Diocletian's personal use, with the rest housing the military garrison. The complex was built on a peninsula six kilometres (3.7 mi) southwest from Salona, the former capital of Dalmatia, one of the largest cities of the late empire with 60,000 people and the birthplace of Diocletian.

Today the palace forms about half of the old town of Split, with 3,000 inhabitants and numerous shops, boutiques, cafes, bars, and restaurants. In 1979, it was listed by UNESCO as a World Heritage Site.

== History ==
Diocletian had ordered the construction of the heavily fortified compound near his hometown of Spalatum in preparation for his retirement on 1 May 305 AD. The site chosen was near Salona, the provincial administrative centre of Dalmatia, on the southern side of a short peninsula. Based on Roman map data (known through the medieval parchment copy of the Tabula Peutingeriana), there was already a Spalatum settlement in that bay, the remains and size of which have not yet been established.

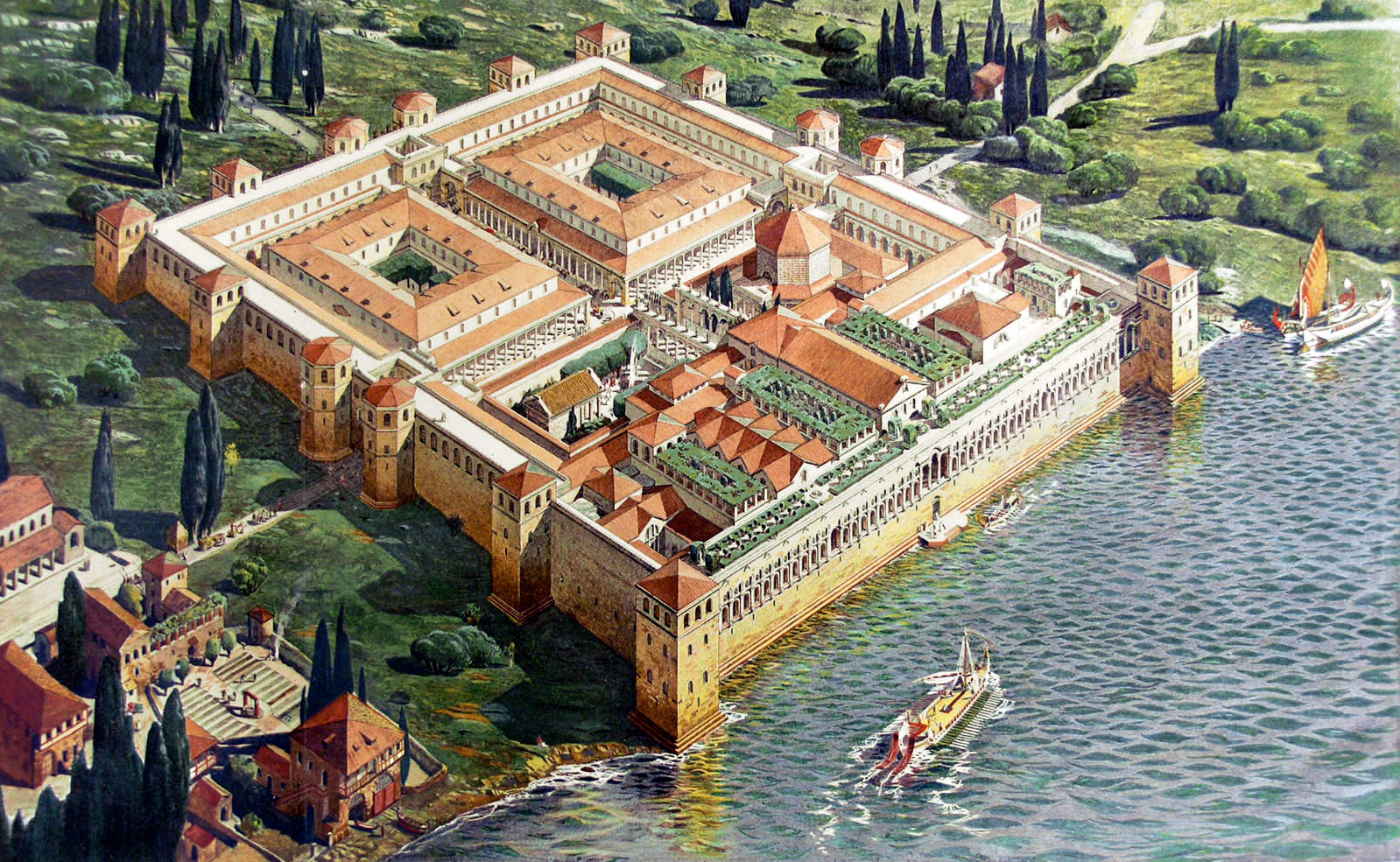
Reconstruction of Diocletian's Palace in its original appearance upon completion in AD 305 (viewed from the south-west)

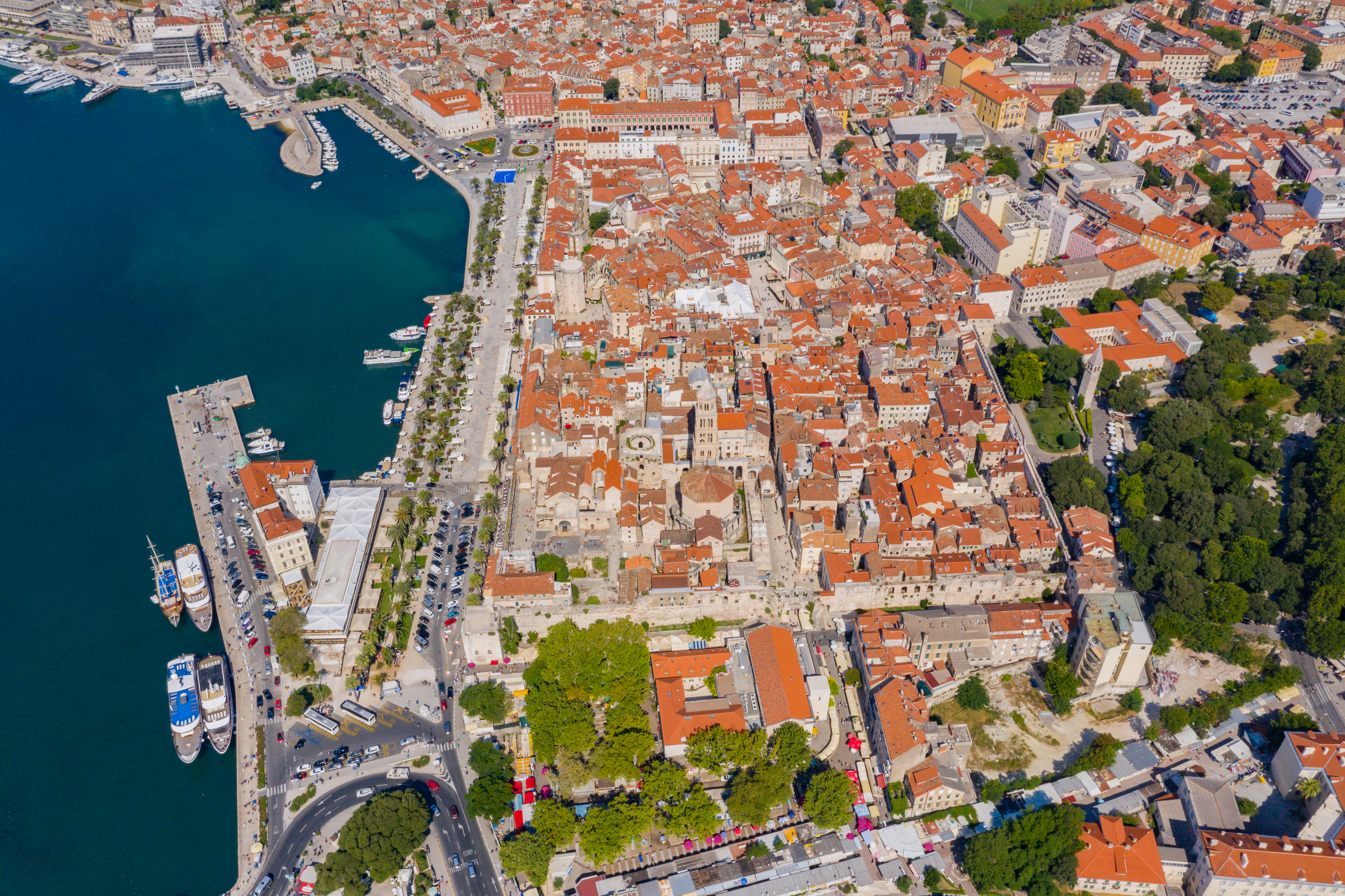
Diocletian's Palace in 2019 (viewed from the east)

The beginning of the construction of Diocletian's palace has not exactly been established. It is assumed to have begun around 295, after the introduction of the Tetrarchy (the rule of four). Yet ten years after that decision, when Diocletian abdicated in 305, the palace seems to have still been unfinished, and there are indications that some works were taking place while the emperor was residing at the Palace. It is unknown under whose architectural ideas the palace was built and who its builders were. The complex was modelled on Roman forts of the 3rd-century era, examples of which can be seen across the limes, such as the bridgehead fort of Castrum Divitia across the Rhine from Cologne.

However, the engraved Greek names Zotikos and Filotas, as well as many Greek characters, indicate that a number of builders were originally from the eastern part of the empire, i.e. Diocletian brought with him masters from the East. Still, a large part of the workforce was likely of local origin. The basic materials came from close proximity. The white limestone comes from Brač and some from Seget near Trogir; tufa was extracted from nearby riverbeds, and bricks were made in Spalatum and other workshops located nearby.

At Carnuntum, people begged Diocletian to return to the throne in order to resolve the conflicts that had arisen through Constantine's rise to power and Maxentius's usurpation. Diocletian famously replied:

If you could show the cabbage that I planted with my own hands to your emperor, he definitely wouldn't dare suggest that I replace the peace and happiness of this place with the storms of a never-satisfied greed.

This was a reference to the Emperor retiring to his palace to grow cabbages.

Diocletian lived on for four more years, spending his days in his palace gardens. He saw his tetrarchic system fail, torn by the selfish ambitions of his successors. He heard of Maximian's third claim to the throne, his forced suicide, and his damnatio memoriae. In his palace, statues and portraits of his former companion emperor were torn down and destroyed. Deep in despair and illness, Diocletian may have committed suicide. He died on 3 December 312. (Note: The range of dates proposed for Diocletian's death have stretched from 311 through to 318. Until recently, the date of 3 December 311 has been favoured; however, the absence of Diocletian on Maxentius's "AETERNA MEMORIA" coins would indicate that he was alive through to Maxentius's defeat in October 312. Given that Diocletian had died by the time of Maximian Daia's death in July 313, it has been argued that the correct date of his death was 3 December 312.)

With the death of Diocletian, the life of the palace did not end, and it remained an imperial possession of the Roman court, providing shelter to the expelled members of the Emperor's family. In 480, Emperor Julius Nepos was murdered by one of his own soldiers, reportedly stabbed to death in his villa near Salona. Since Diocletian's palace was in the same area, it might have been the same building.

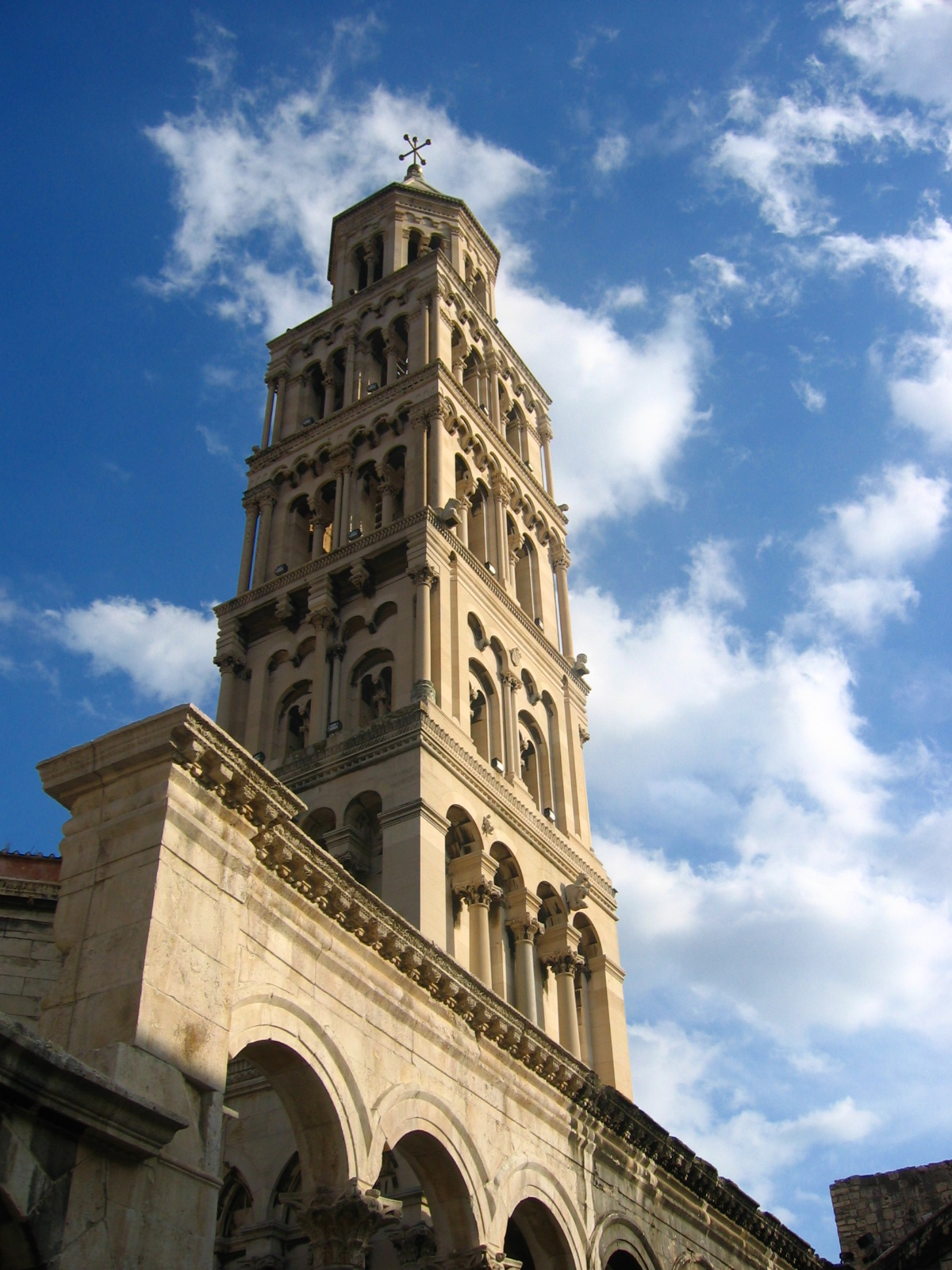
The Romanesque bell tower of the Cathedral of Saint Domnius

Its second life came when Salona was largely destroyed in the invasions of the Avars and Slavs in the 7th century, though the exact year of the destruction still remains an open debate between archaeologists. Part of the expelled population, now refugees, found shelter inside the palace's strong walls and with them a new, organized city life began. Since then, the palace has been continuously occupied, with residents making their homes and businesses within the palace basement and directly in its walls. St Martin's Church is an example of this trend. Today many restaurants and shops, and some homes can still be found within the walls.

In the period of the free medieval commune, between the 12th and 14th centuries, there was a greater architectural development when many medieval houses filled not only Roman buildings but also a large part of the free space of streets and docks. Also completed in this period was the construction of the Romanesque bell tower of the Cathedral of Saint Domnius, which inhabits the building that was originally erected as Jupiter's temple and then used as the Mausoleum of Diocletian.

After the Middle Ages, the palace was virtually unknown in the rest of Europe until the Scottish architect Robert Adam had the ruins surveyed. Then, with the aid of French artist and antiquary Charles-Louis Clérisseau and several draughtsmen, Adam published Ruins of the Palace of Emperor Diocletian at Spalatro in Dalmatia (London, 1764).

Diocletian's palace was an inspiration for Adam's new style of Neoclassical architecture and the publication of measured drawings brought it into the design vocabulary of European architecture for the first time. A few decades later, in 1782, the French painter Louis-François Cassas created drawings of the palace, published by Joseph Lavallée in 1802 in the chronicles of his voyages.

Today, the Palace is well preserved with all the most important historical buildings, in the centre of the city of Split, the second-largest city of modern Croatia. Diocletian's Palace far transcends local importance because of its degree of preservation. The Palace is one of the most famous and complete architectural and cultural features on the Croatian Adriatic coast. As the world's most complete remains of a Roman palace, it holds an outstanding place in Mediterranean, European, and world heritage.

== Cultural heritage ==
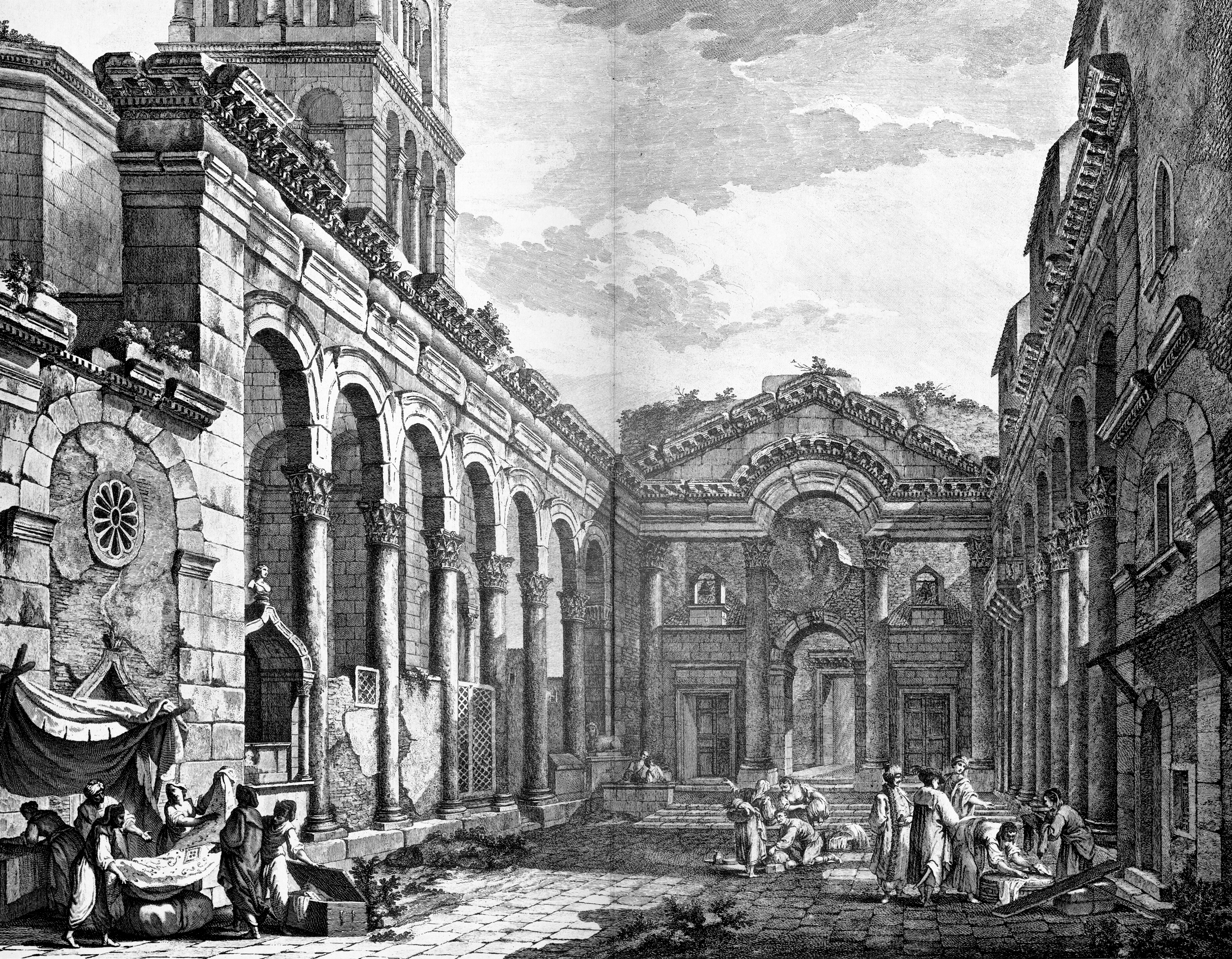
View of the Peristyle in 1764, engraving by Robert Adam. The Peristyle is the central square of the palace, where the main entrance to Diocletian's quarters (pictured) is located.

In November 1979, UNESCO, in line with the international convention on cultural and natural heritage, adopted a proposal that the historic city of Split built around the Palace should be included in the register of World Cultural Heritage.

In November 2006, the city council decided to permit over twenty new buildings within the palace (including a shopping and garage complex), although the palace had been declared a World Heritage Site. It is said that this decision was politically motivated and largely due to lobbying by local property developers. Once the public 2007 became aware of the project, they petitioned against the decision and won. No new buildings, shopping centres or underground garages were built.

The World Monuments Fund has been working on a conservation project at the palace, including surveying structural integrity and cleaning and restoring the stone and plasterwork.

The palace was depicted on the reverse of the Croatian 500 kuna banknote, issued in 1993.

== Architecture ==
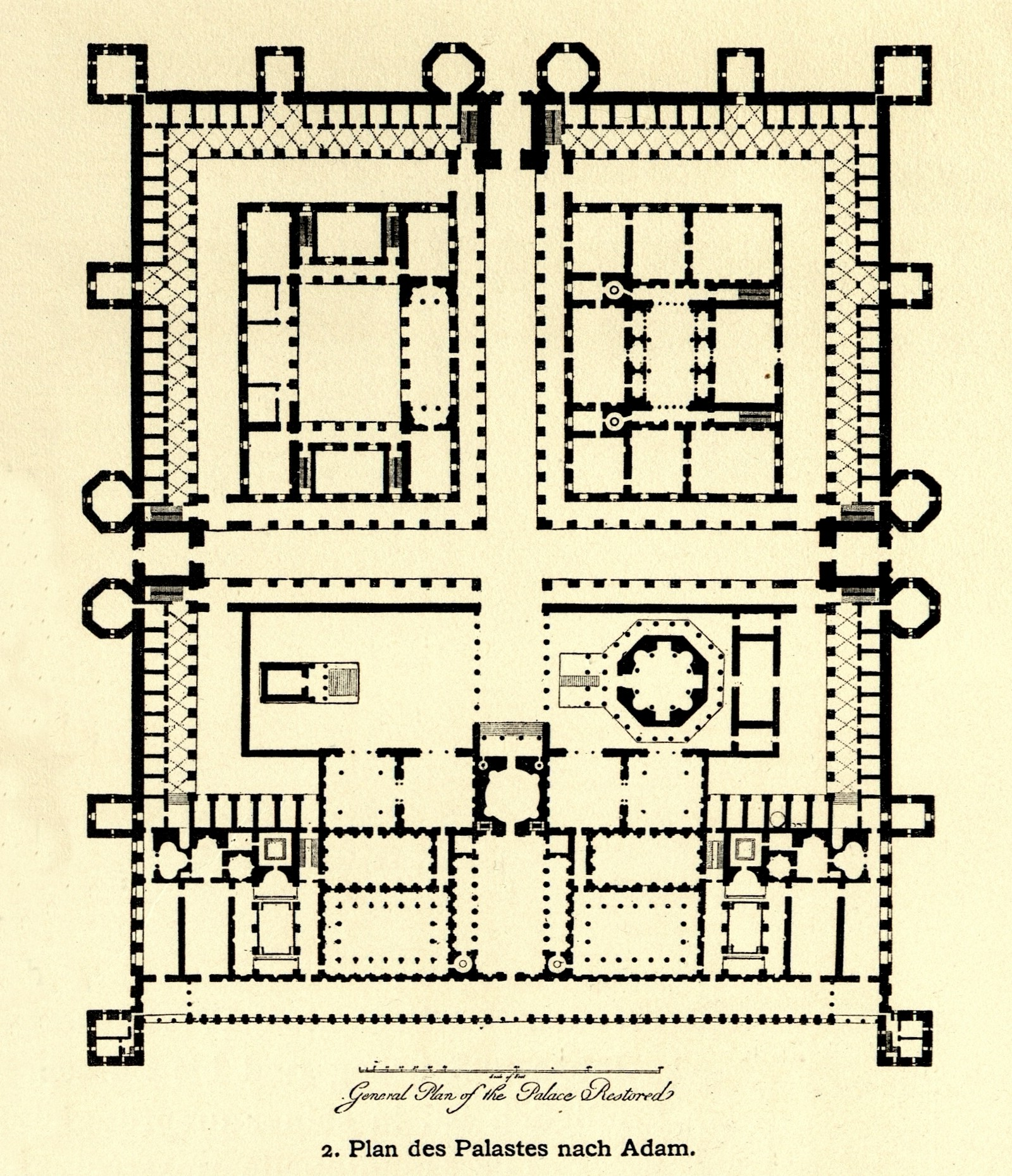
Floor plan of Diocletian's palace

The ground plan of the palace is an irregular rectangle measuring east: 214.97 m, north: 174.74 m, south: 181.65 m (adjusting for the terrain), with sixteen towers projecting from the western, northern, and eastern facades on the facades facing the mainland. There are four towers on the corners of the square, giving the palace a characteristic of the legionary forts similar to those on the Danube.

Two of the six octagonal ground-floor towers were framed by three landing entrances, the six rectangular ground floors of the rectangular floor being between the corner and the octagonal. To date, three corner towers (except the southwestern) have been preserved, and only the remains of octagonal and rectangular ones. Three well-preserved landings have been architecturally fragmented, especially the northern one, which was the main approach from Salona. The south, seaside gate, is small, simple and well-preserved. The facade walls of the palace in their lower parts are massive and simple without openings, and in the upper part, there are large arches that face the land, i.e. on the west, north and east facades. Subterranean portions of the palace feature barrel vaulted stonework.

Anne Hunnell Chen proposes that Sasanian palace design may have been a significant influence on Diocletian's Palace, particularly given that Diocletian and his co-rulers had personally campaigned on Persian soil before the palaces were constructed. Chen observes that the spatial arrangement of the palace, while mirroring Roman military camp layouts, also closely aligns with the characteristic spatial organization of early Sasanian royal palaces. The pitched brick dome construction technique was unprecedented in Roman imperial architecture prior to the late 3rd century and had roots in Mesopotamian building tradition. Chen suggests it may have reached the Roman world through architects and engineers who accompanied troops on the Persian campaigns. She concludes that the adoption of Persian architectural elements resulted from Rome's decisive victories over the Sasanians in the late 3rd century. In their aftermath, the imperial administration opted to incorporate recognizable markers of Eastern palaces to project power in a visual language legible to both domestic and international audiences.

=== Building materials ===
The Palace is built of white local limestone and marble of high quality, most of which was from the Brač marble quarries on the island of Brač, of tuff taken from the nearby river beds, and of brick made in Salonitan and other factories. Some material for decoration was imported: Egyptian granite columns, fine marble for revetments and some capitals produced in workshops in the Proconnesos.

=== Outer walls ===
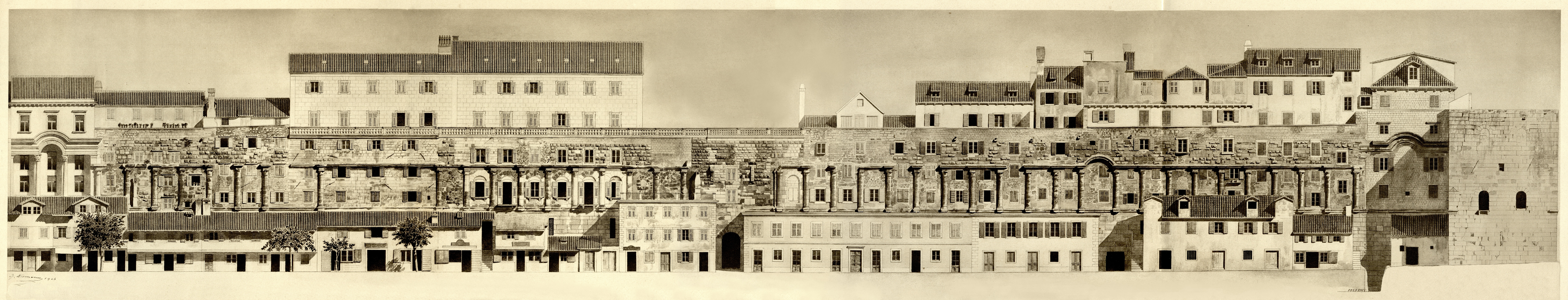
Southern walls in Split (South part of the palace), recorded by George Niemann in 1906.
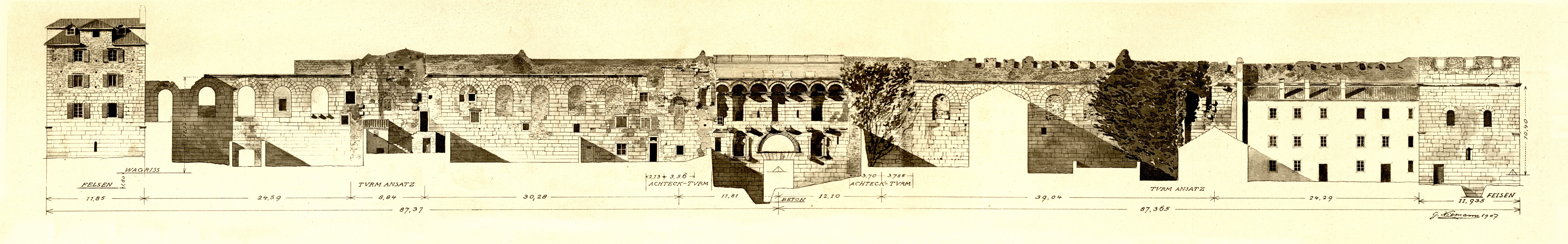
Northern walls in Split (North part of the palace), recorded by George Niemann in 1907.
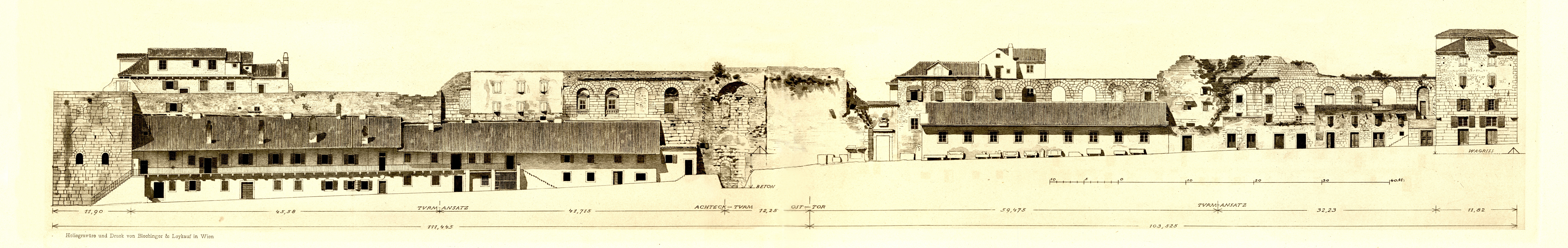
Eastern walls in Split (East part of the palace), recorded by George Niemann in 1907.

Only the southern facade, which rose directly from or very near to the sea, was unfortified. The elaborate architectural composition of the arcaded gallery on its upper floor differs from the more severe treatment of the three shore facades. A monumental gate in the middle of each wall led to an enclosed courtyard. The southern 'Sea Gate' (the Porta Meridionalis) was simpler in shape and dimensions than the other three, and it is thought that it was originally intended either as the emperor's private access to the sea or as a service entrance for supplies.

=== The North Gate ===
The Porta septemtrionalis ("the northern gate") is one of the four principal Roman gates into the Palace. Originally the Main gate from which the Emperor entered the complex, the gate is on the road to the north, towards Salona, the then capital of the Roman province of Dalmatia and Diocletian's birthplace. It is probably the gate the Emperor entered after his abdication from the imperial throne on 1 May 305. Today the 7th-century church of St Martin can be found above the gate, and is open to the public.

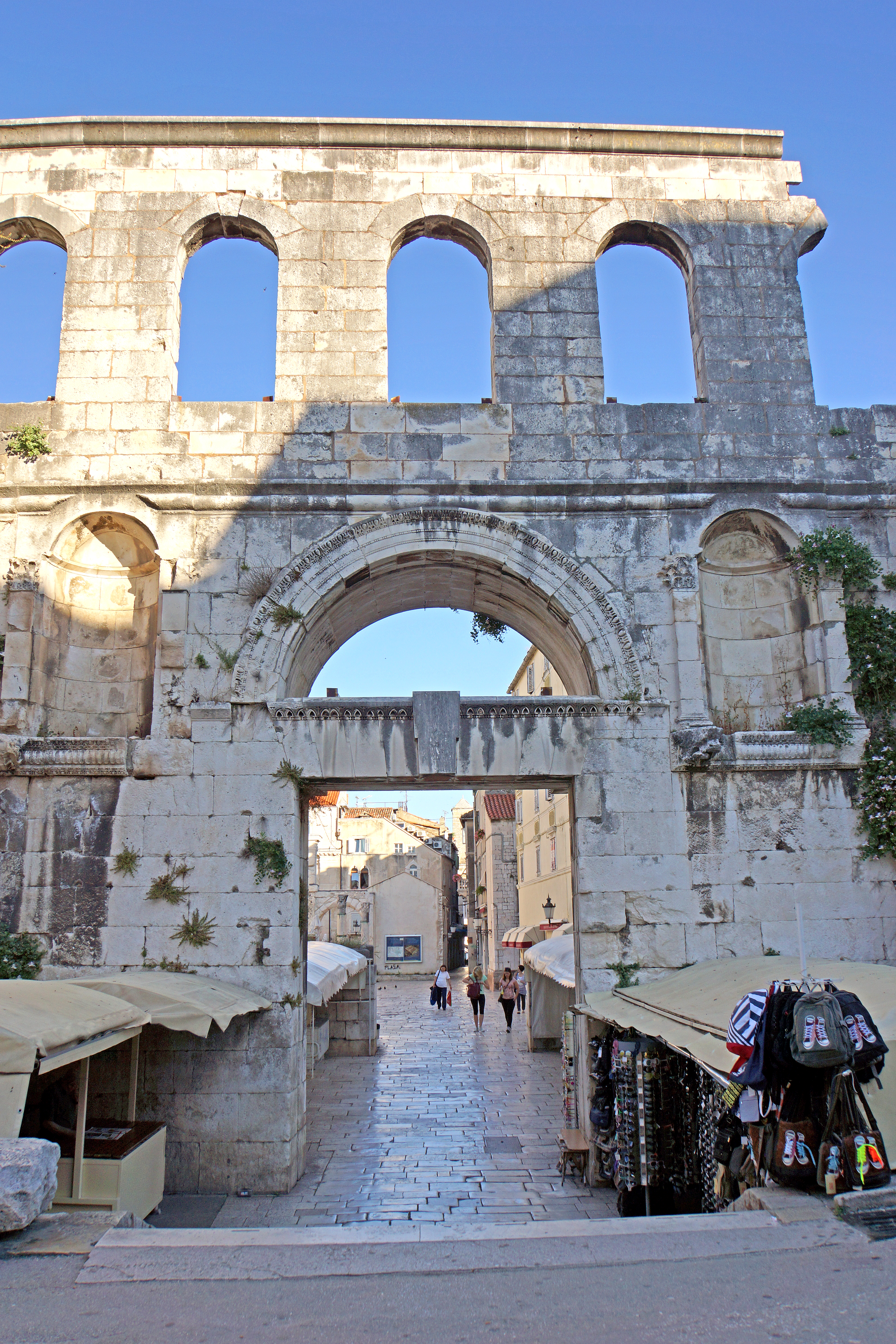
Silver Gate

=== The East Gate ===
The Porta Orientalis ("the eastern gate") is one of the four principal Roman gates into the Palace. Originally a secondary gate, it faces east towards the Roman town of Epetia, today Stobreč. Probably in or around the 6th century, above the gate in the sentry corridor, a small church dedicated to St Apolinar was built. This coincided with the complex seeing an influx of refugees from outlying communities, similar churches were over the Golden Gate, the Iron Gate, and the Bronze Gate. The structure of this part of the wall and the door itself were later incorporated in various buildings in the following centuries, such as the Church of Dušica, which was destroyed in the Second World War.

=== The West Gate ===
Porta Occidentalis ("the western gate") is one of the four principal Roman gates into the Palace. Originally a military gate from which troops entered the complex, the gate is the only one to have remained in continuous use to the present day. During the persecutions under Theodosius I a relief sculpture of Nike, the Roman goddess of Victory (which stood on the lintel) was removed from the gate, later in the 5th century, Christians engraved a Cross in its place. In the 6th century, above the gate a small church dedicated to St. Teodora. This coincided with the complex seeing an influx of refugees from outlying communities, similar churches were over the Golden Gate, the Silver Gate, and the Bronze Gate.

=== The South Gate ===
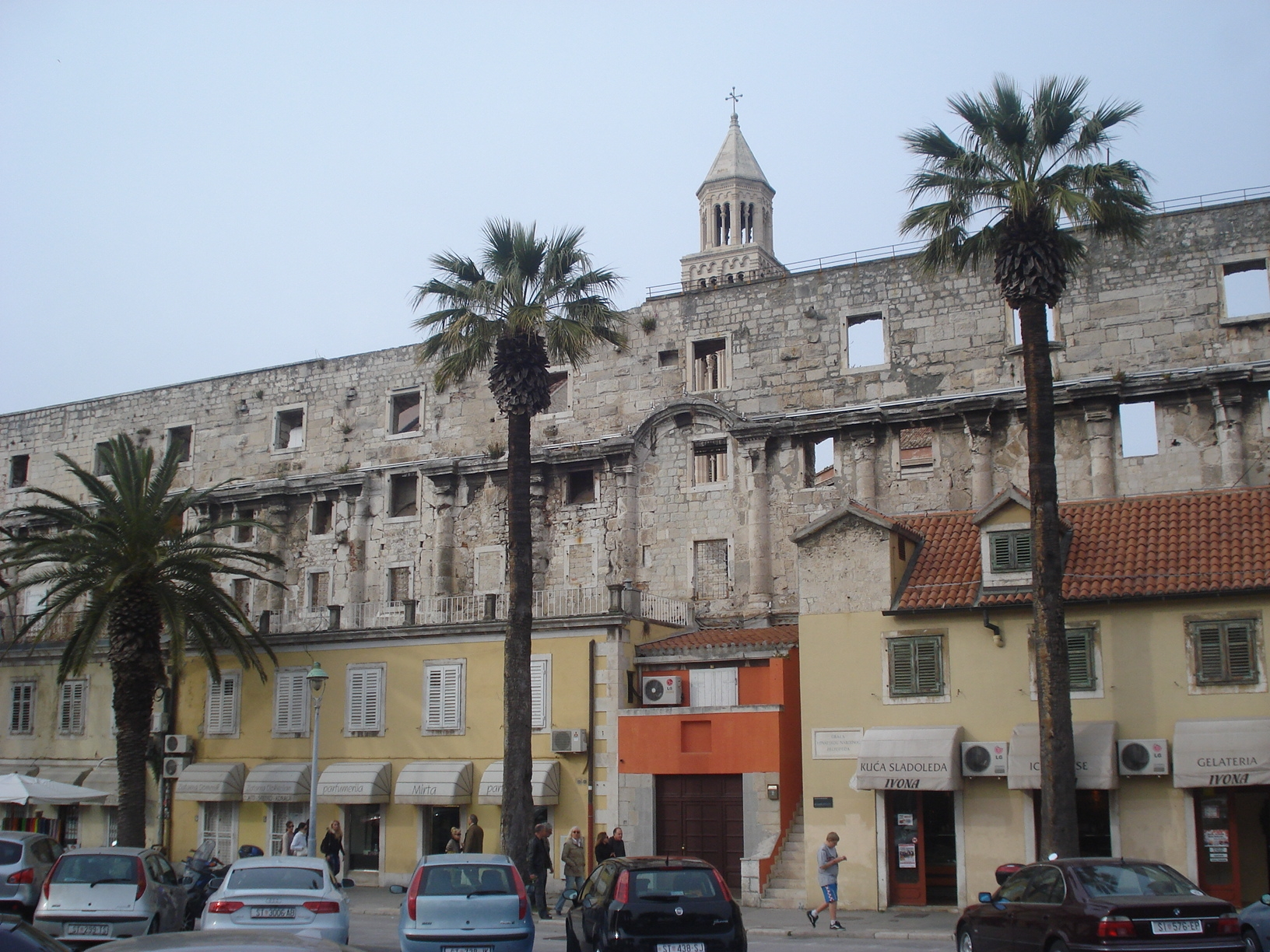
Part of the southern wall today

The Porta Meridionalis or "the southern gate" is the smaller of the four principal Roman gates into the Palace. Originally a sea gate from which the Emperor entered the complex by boat, via basement rooms in the Imperial Palace.

=== Inner layout ===
The design is derived from both villa and castrum types and this duality is also evident in the arrangement of the interior. The transverse road (decumanus) linking the Eastern gate and Western gate divided the complex into two halves.

=== Southern half ===
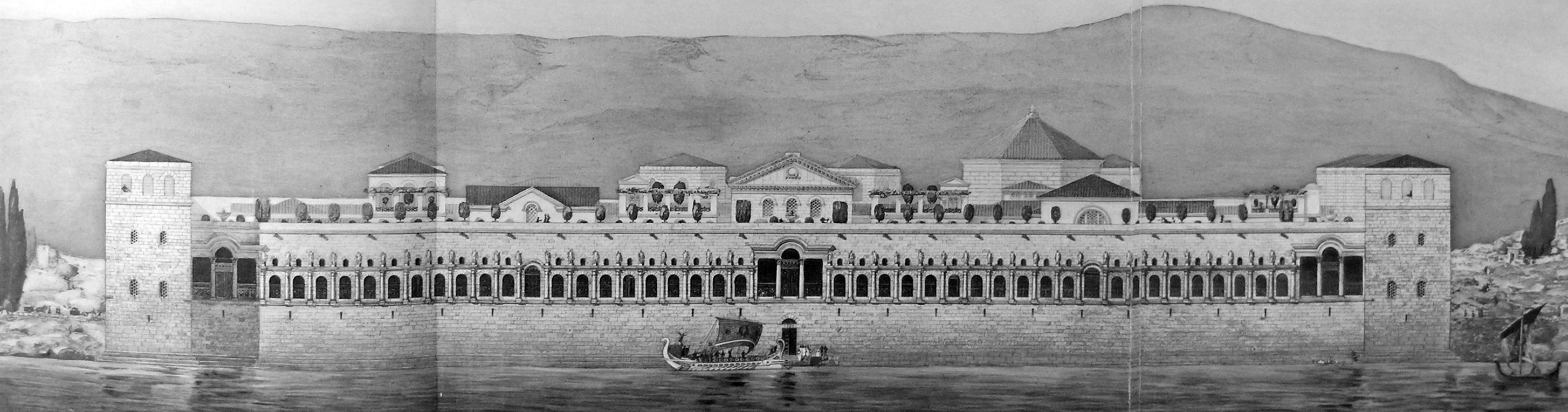
Reconstruction of the façade to the sea from E. Hébrard and J. Zeiller, Spalato, le Palais de Dioclétien, Paris, 1912

In the southern half there were more luxurious structures than in the northern section; these included public, private and religious buildings, as well as the Emperor's apartments.

==== Emperor's apartment ====
The Emperor's apartments formed a block along the seafront, with an exterior square and circular floor plan, with a dome. From there, one approached the Emperor's apartment, which stretched 40 m deep along the entire south facade; it is only partly preserved on the upper floor, but its ground-floor, translated substructures that directly bore it are almost completely preserved, so the overall layout and appearance of the upper spaces can be seen given the coincidence of the upper and lower floor plans. On the west side of the upper floor are preserved the remains of a dome hall and two halls with apses, and on the east side are parts of an octagonal dining room (triclinium) with three halls with a cross floor plan. The wall of the Western Cross Hall is preserved at full height. Diocletian's apartment was interconnected by a long room along the southern façade (cryptoporticus) from which through 42 windows and 3 balconies a view of the sea was opened. Two baths were recently found north of the Emperor's apartment, one adjacent to the west and the other to the eastern halls. Although for many centuries almost completely filled with refuse, most of the substructure is well preserved and indicates the original shape and disposition of the rooms above.

==== The Vestibule ====
A rotunda, that was once the first section of the imperial corridor in the Palace that led via the Peristyle to the Imperial apartments of the Palace.

==== The Palace Cellars ====
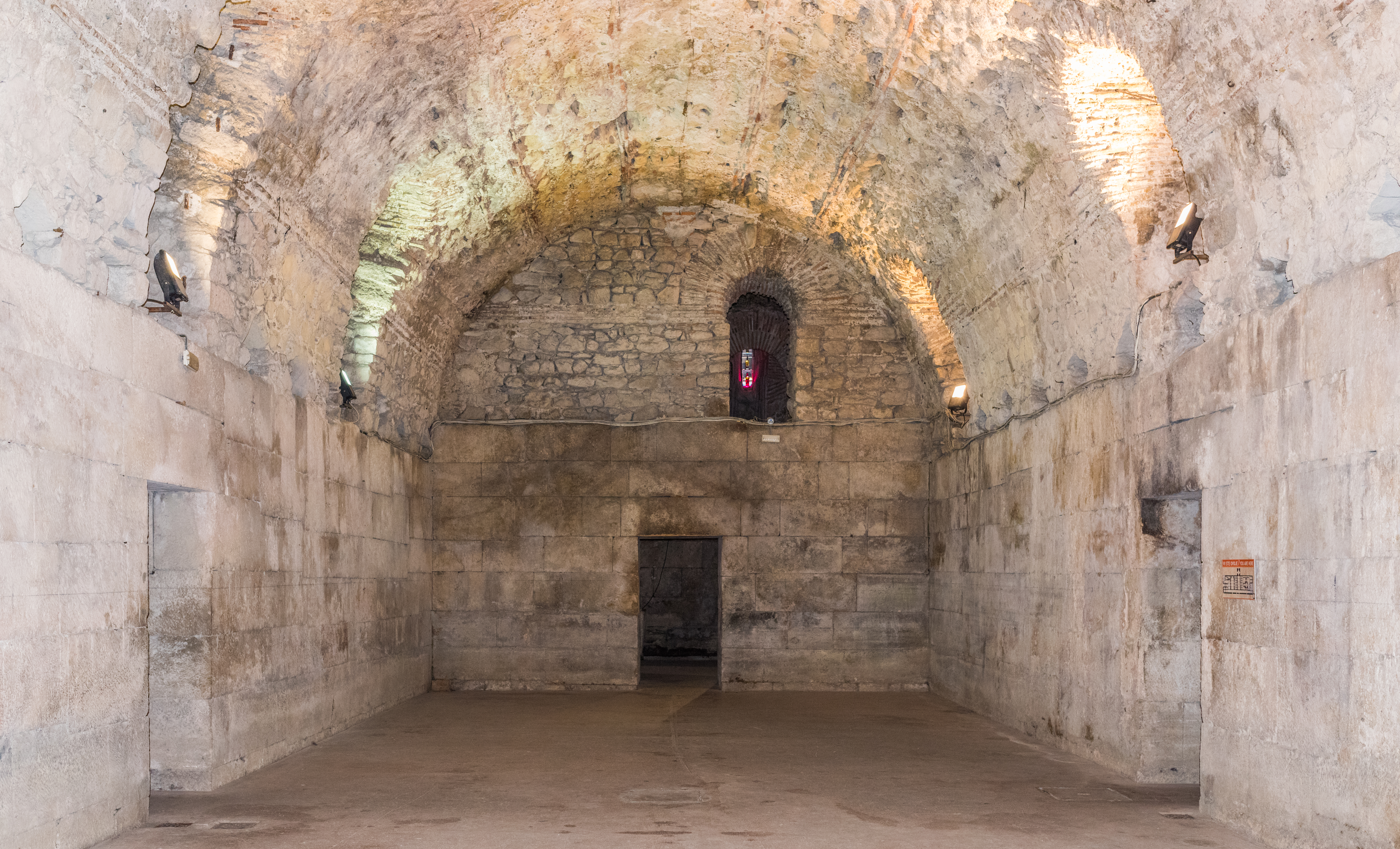
Cellars of Diocletian's Palace

Set below what were the Imperial apartments, the Cellars of Diocletian's Palace are a set of substructures located at the southern end of the Palace, that represent one of the best preserved ancient complexes of their kind in the world.

==== Peristyle ====
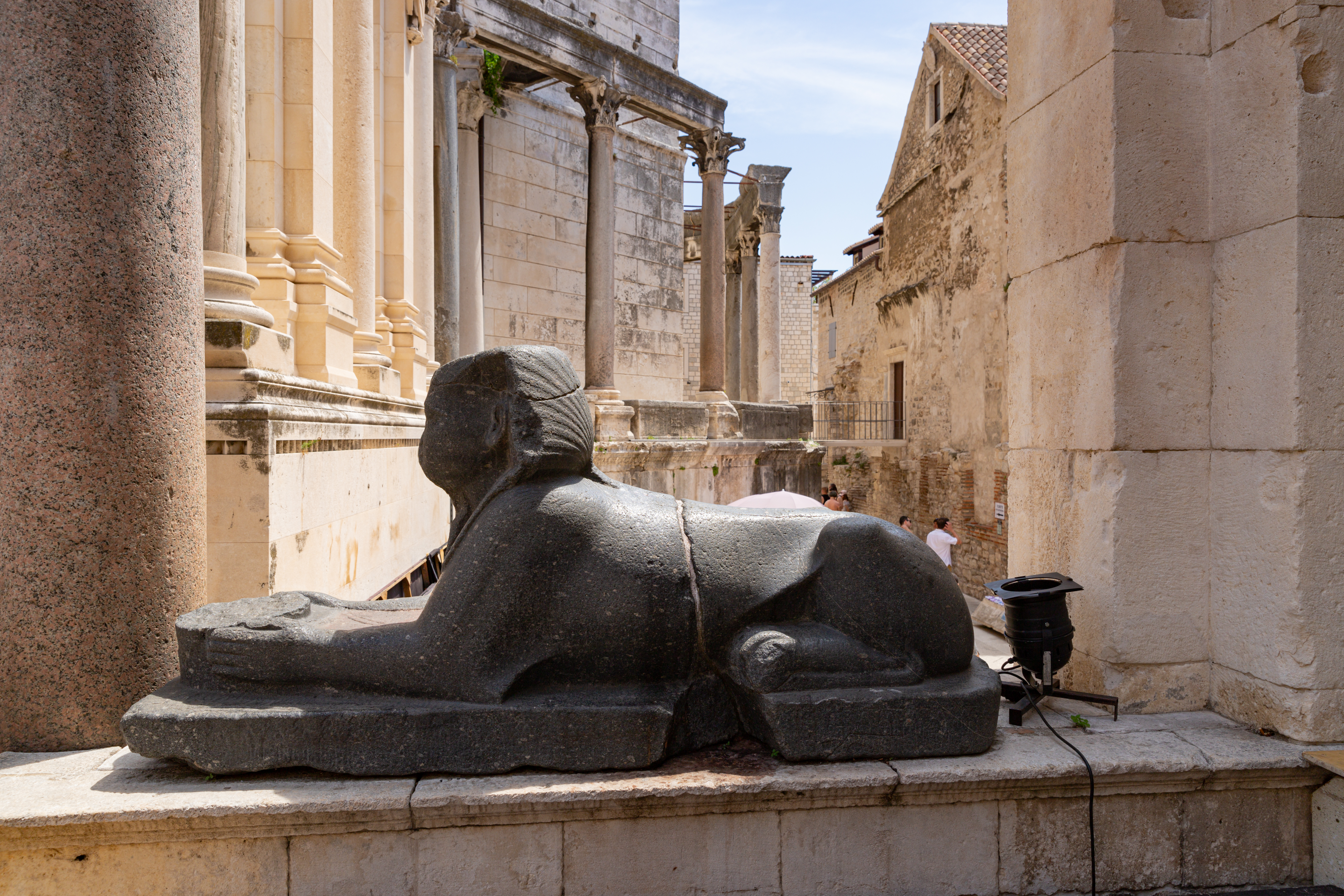
Sphinx at the Peristyle

A monumental court, the Peristyle, formed the northern access to the imperial apartments in front of the Vestibule. It also gave access to Diocletian's mausoleum on the east (today the Cathedral of Saint Domnius) and to three temples on the west (two of which are now lost, with the third, originally being the temple of Jupiter, becoming a baptistery). There is also a temple just to the west of the Peristyle called The Temple of Aesculapius, which has a semi-cylindrical roof built of stone blocks, which did not leak until the 1940s when it was covered with a lead roof. The temple was recently restored.

==== Egyptian sphinxes ====
The Palace was decorated with numerous 3500-year-old granite sphinxes, originating from the site of Egyptian Pharaoh Thutmose III. Originally twelve sphinxes brought from Egypt by Emperor Diocletian. Scottish architect Robert Adam considered this temple to be one of Europe's most beautiful monuments. Only three have survived the centuries. One is still on the Peristyle, the second sits headless in front of Jupiter's temple, and a third is housed in the city museum.

==== Temple of Jupiter ====
Dedicated to the Ancient Roman god Jupiter, it is located in the western part of the southern section of the Palace complex, near the Peristyle. It was built between 295 and 305, during the construction of the Palace. Since the Emperor unexpectedly abdicated the throne in 305 and arrived at the palace from Nicomedia earlier, finishing work on the construction of the Palace was stopped so parts of the Temple remained unfinished. The temple was later converted into a church, probably a Baptistery of St. John the Baptist in the 6th century, at the same time when the crypt dedicated to St. Thomas was built.

=== Northern half ===
The northern half of the palace, divided into two parts by the main north–south street (cardo) leading from the Golden Gate (Porta aurea) to the Peristyle, is less well preserved. It is usually supposed that each part was a residential complex housing soldiers, servants, and possibly some other facilities.

=== Streets and annex buildings ===
Both parts of the palace were apparently surrounded by streets, leading to the perimeter walls through a rectangular buildings (possibly storage magazines).

== Filming location ==
Diocletian's Palace was used as a location for filming the fourth season of the HBO series Game of Thrones. The palace also hosted a task on the 31st season of the CBS reality show The Amazing Race.

== Gallery ==
=== Outside areas within the complex ===
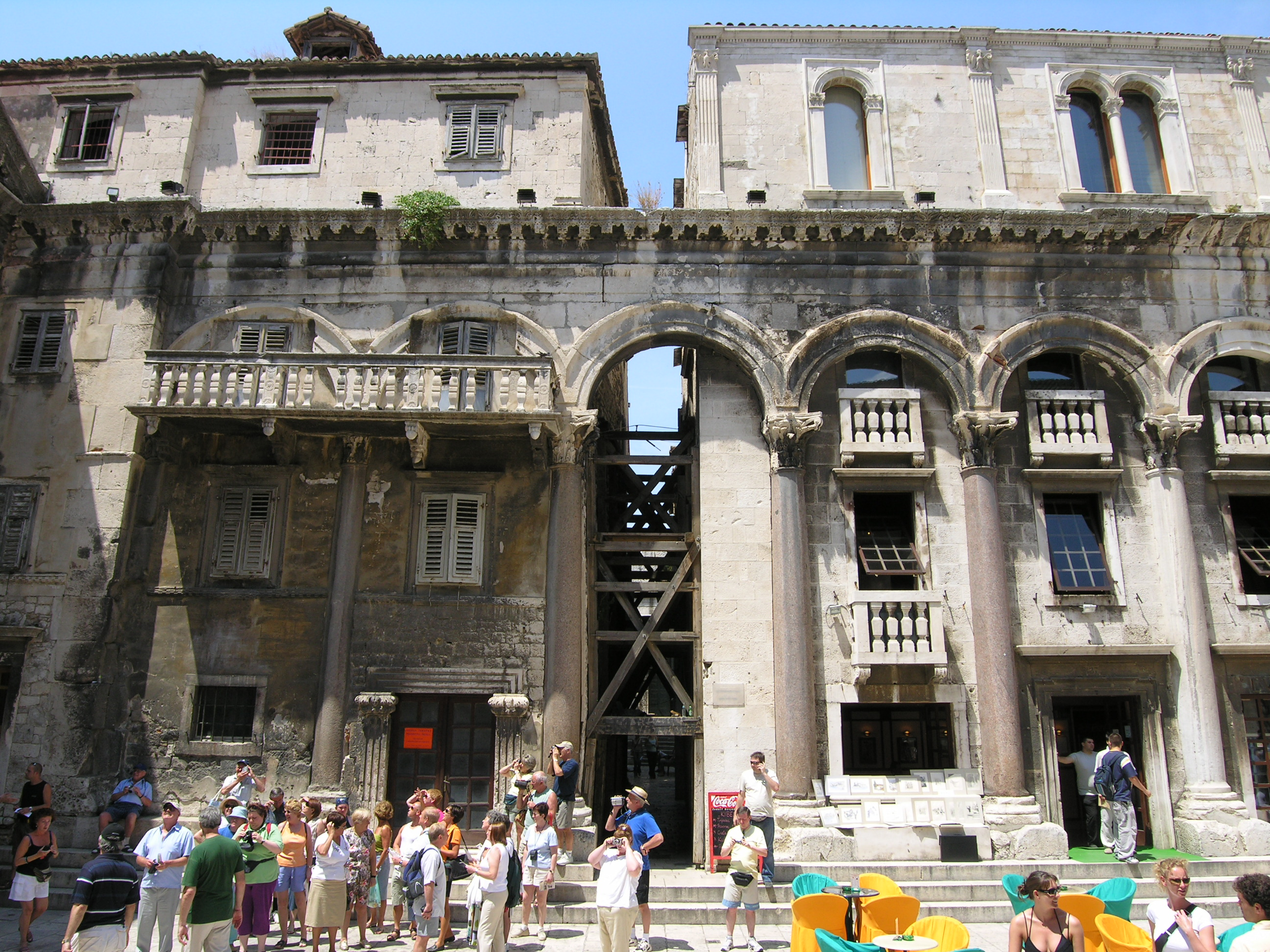
Diocletian's Palace.

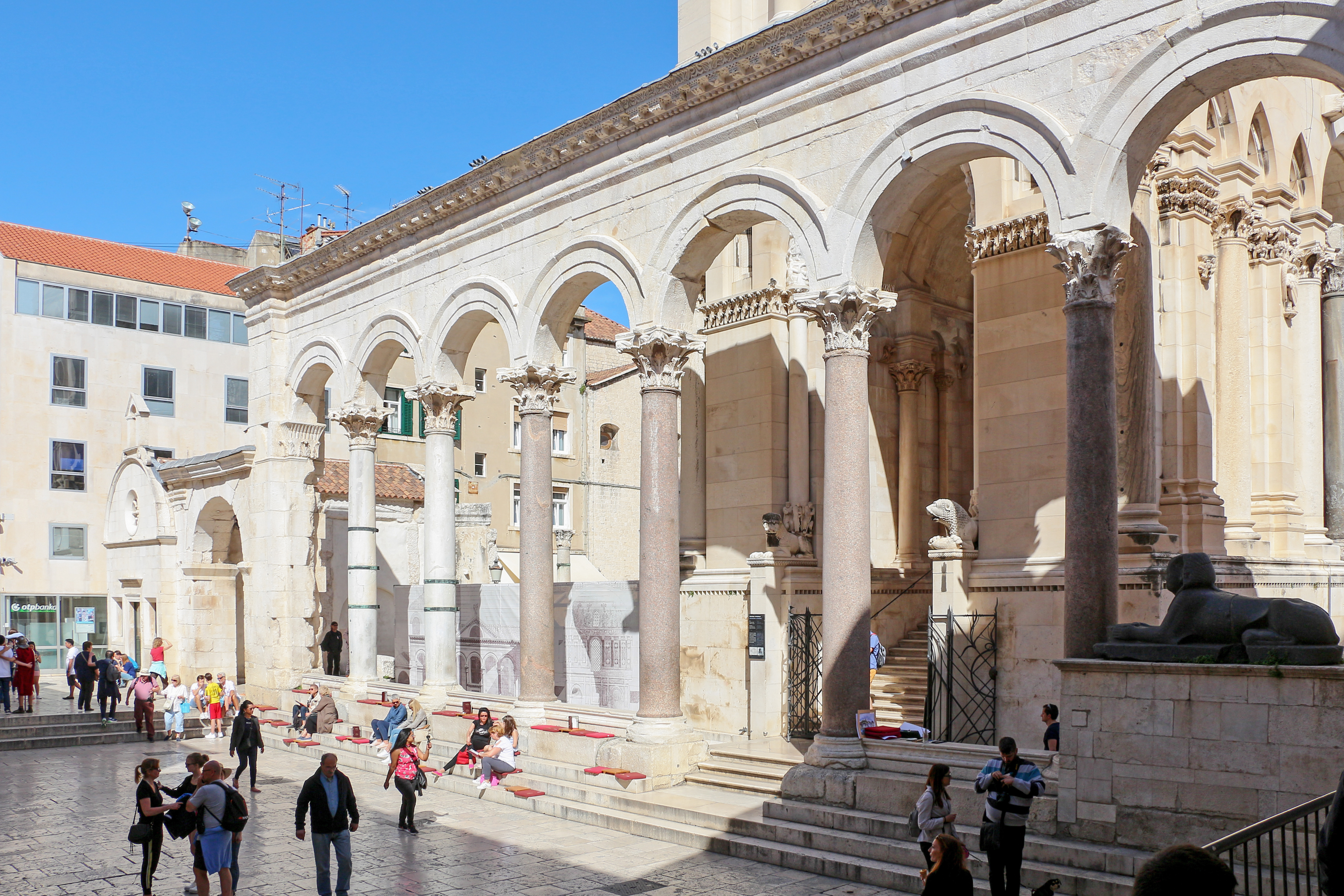
Peristyle of the palace.

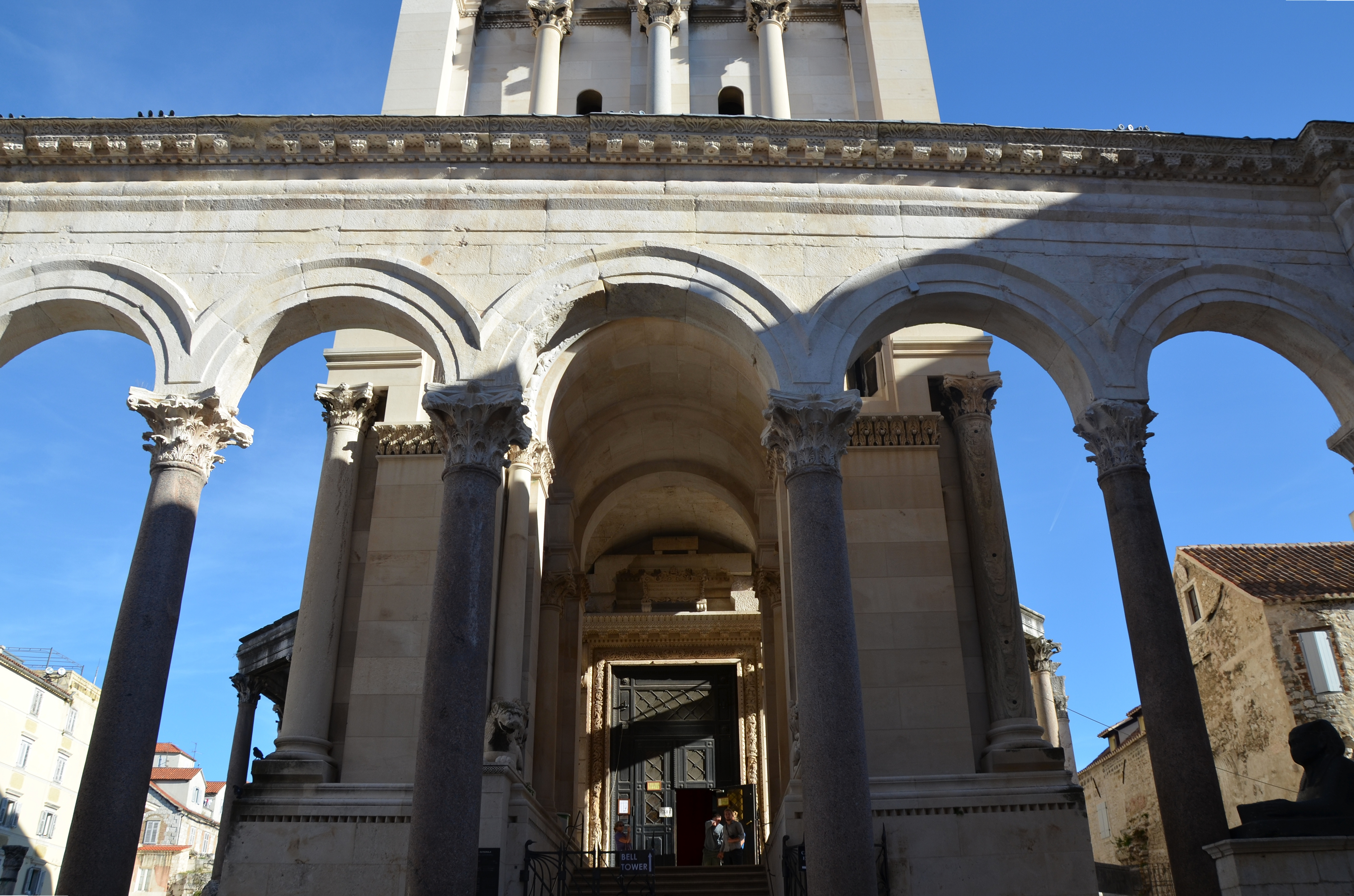
Diocletian's Palace.

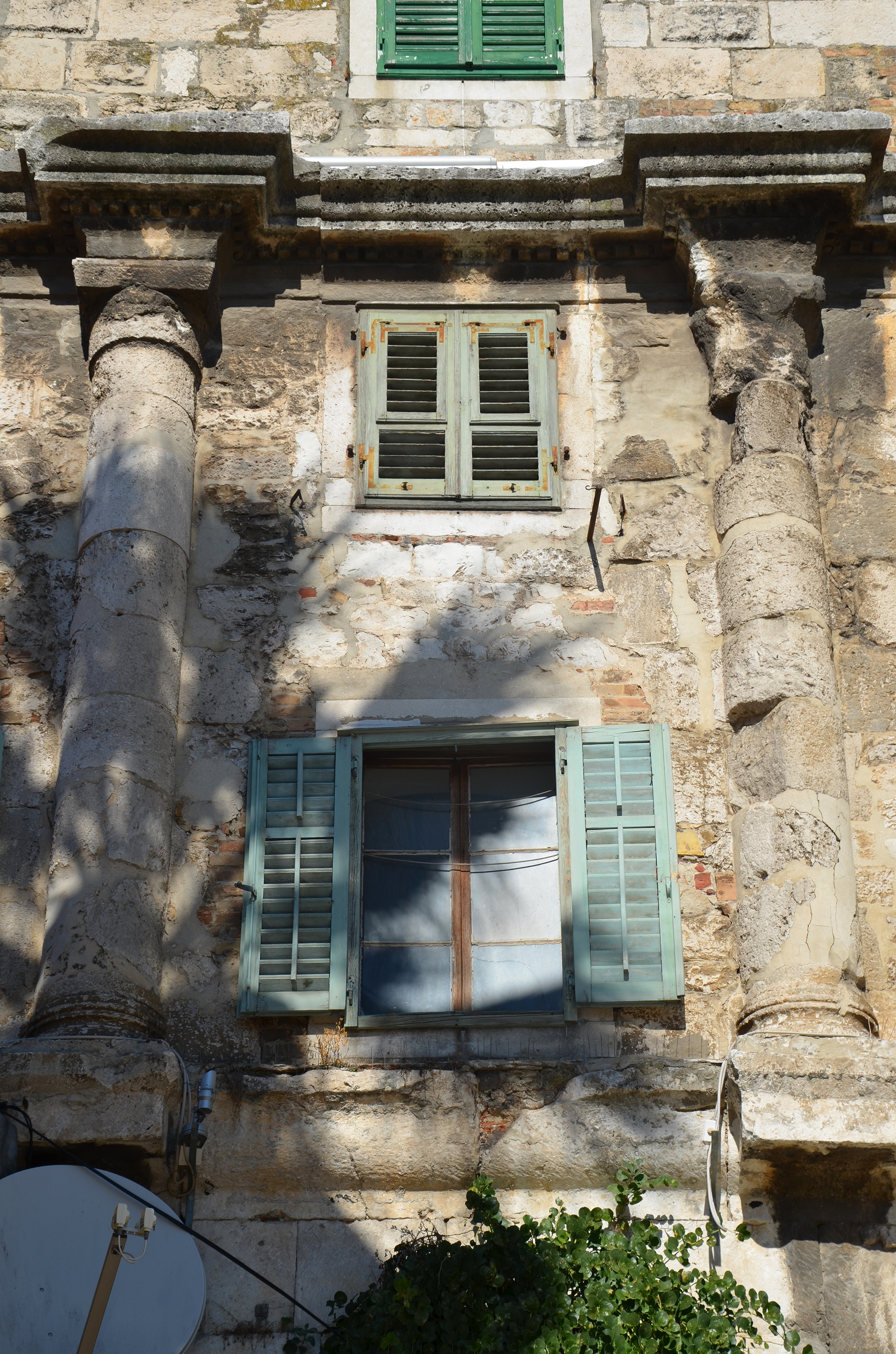
Palace house.

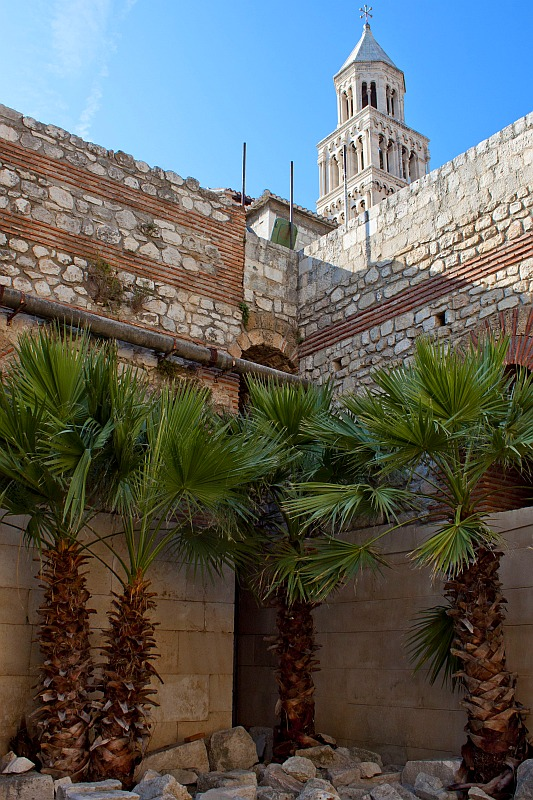
Diocletian's Palace substructure garden.

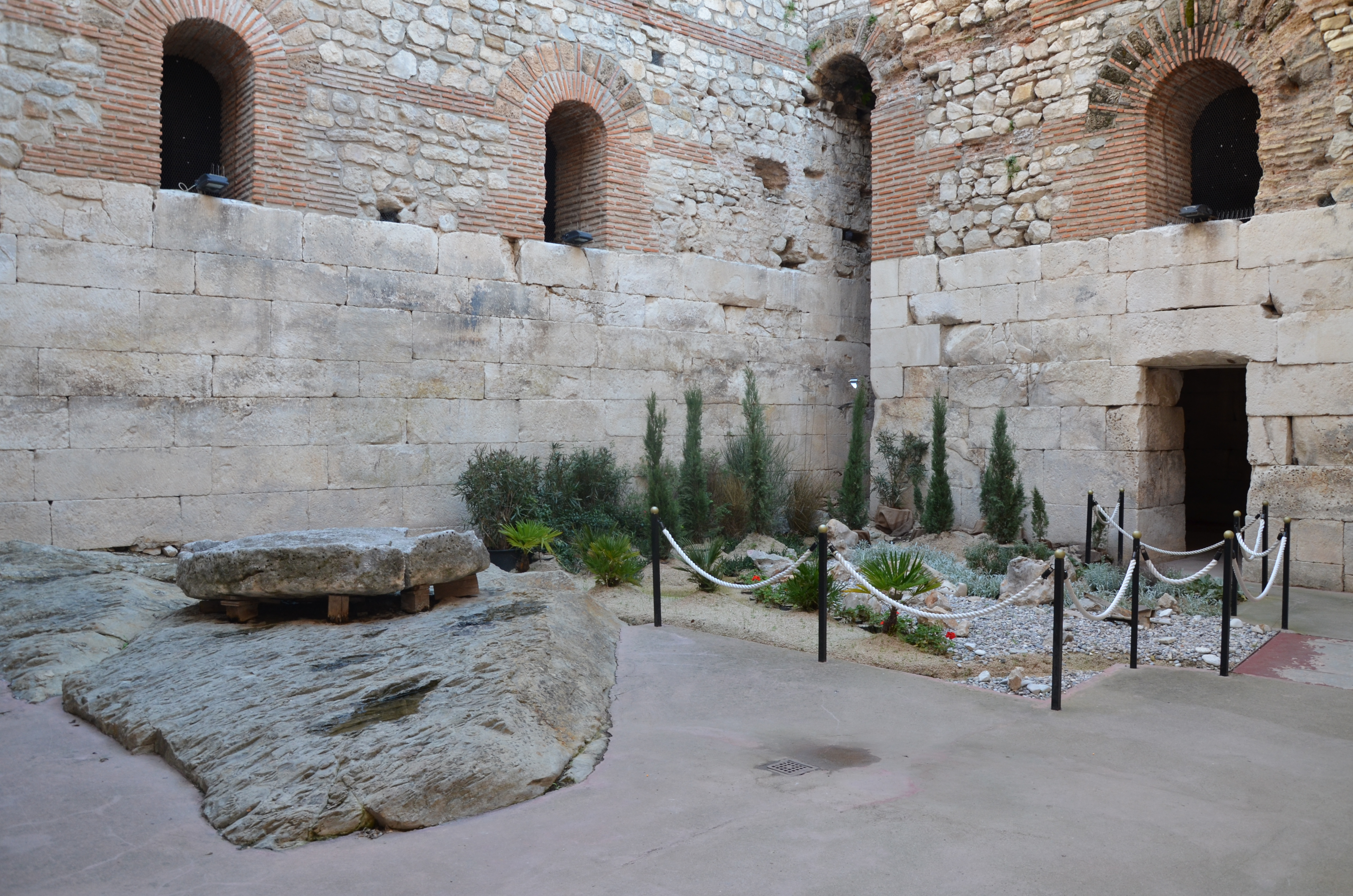
The fortifications of the palace.

=== Views of the exterior of the complex ===
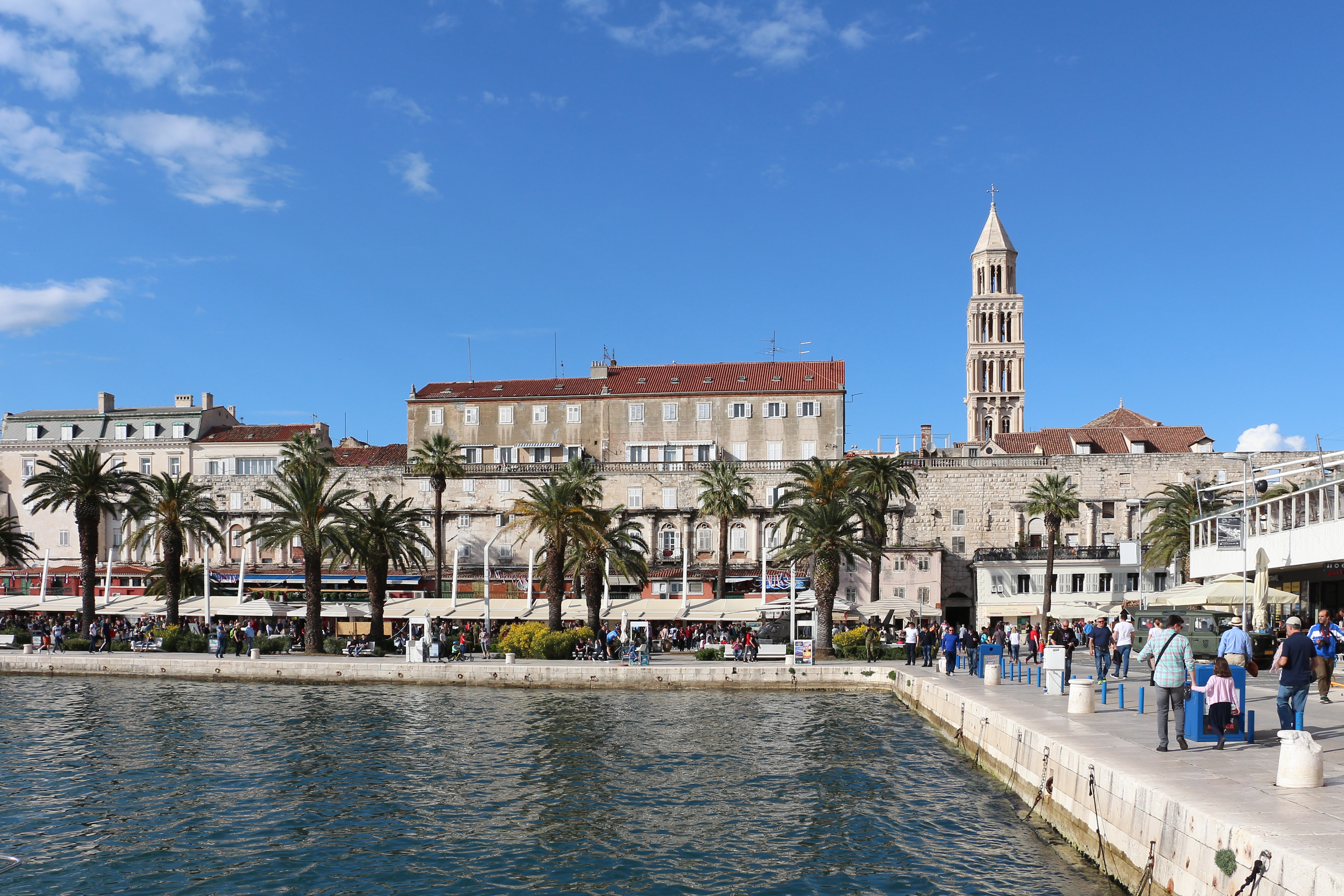
South view of the Palace.

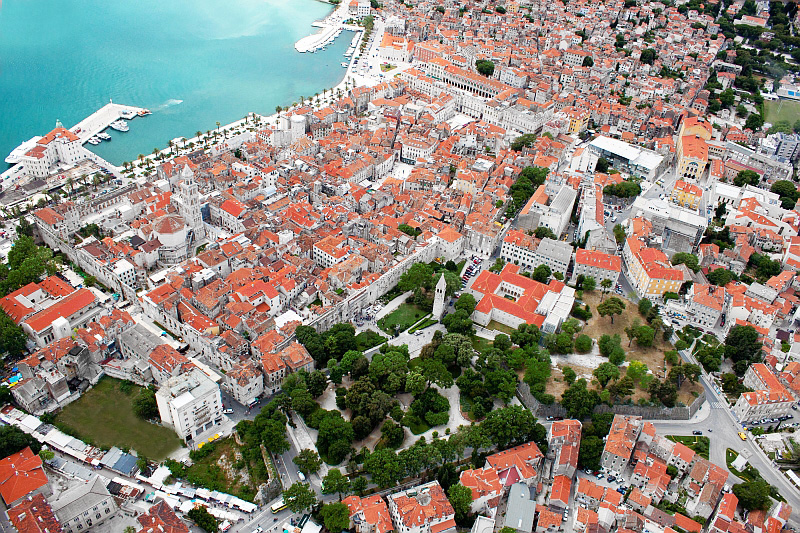
Aerial view of the Diocletian Palace in the city of Split (2012).

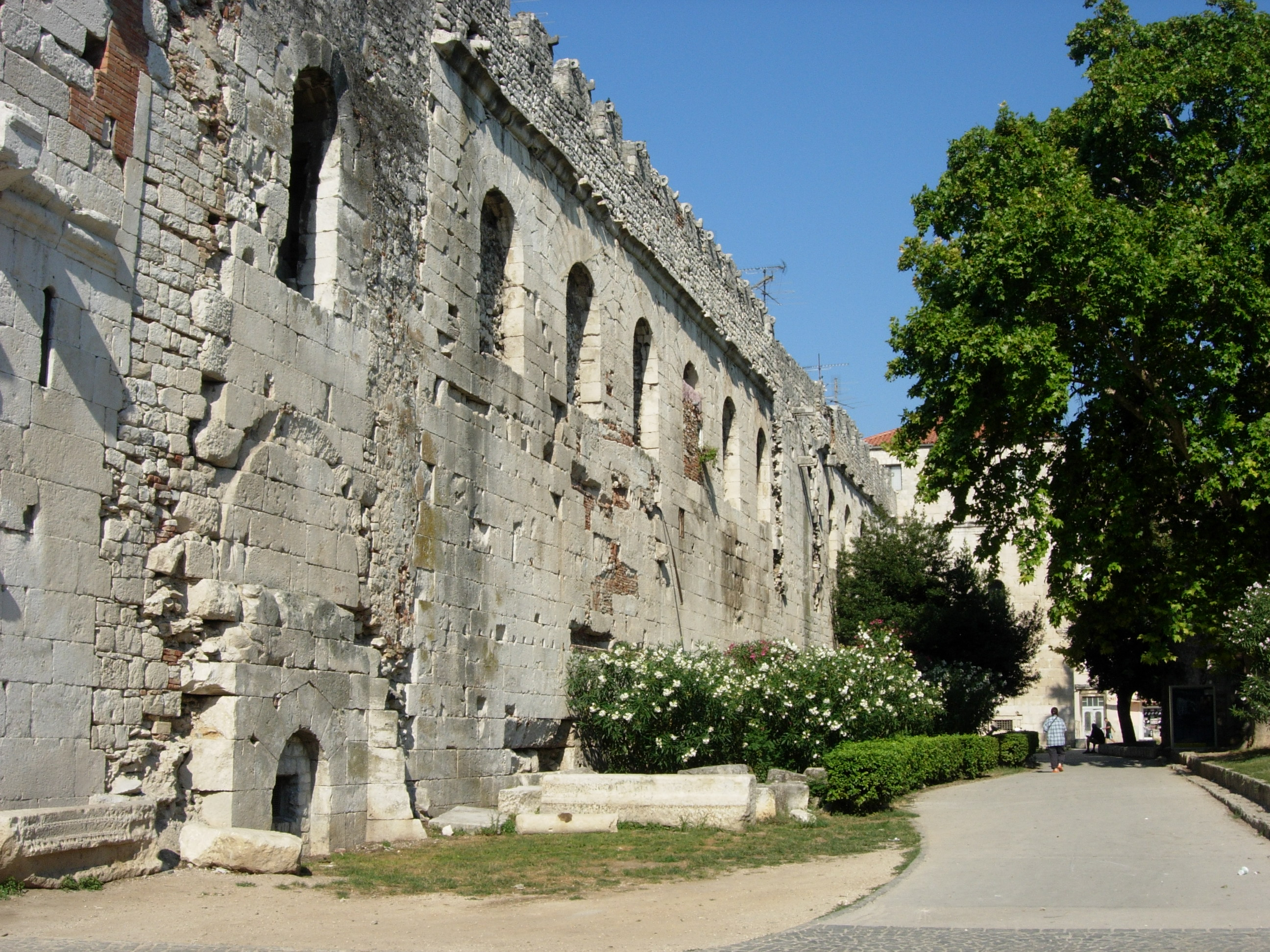
North wall of the palace.

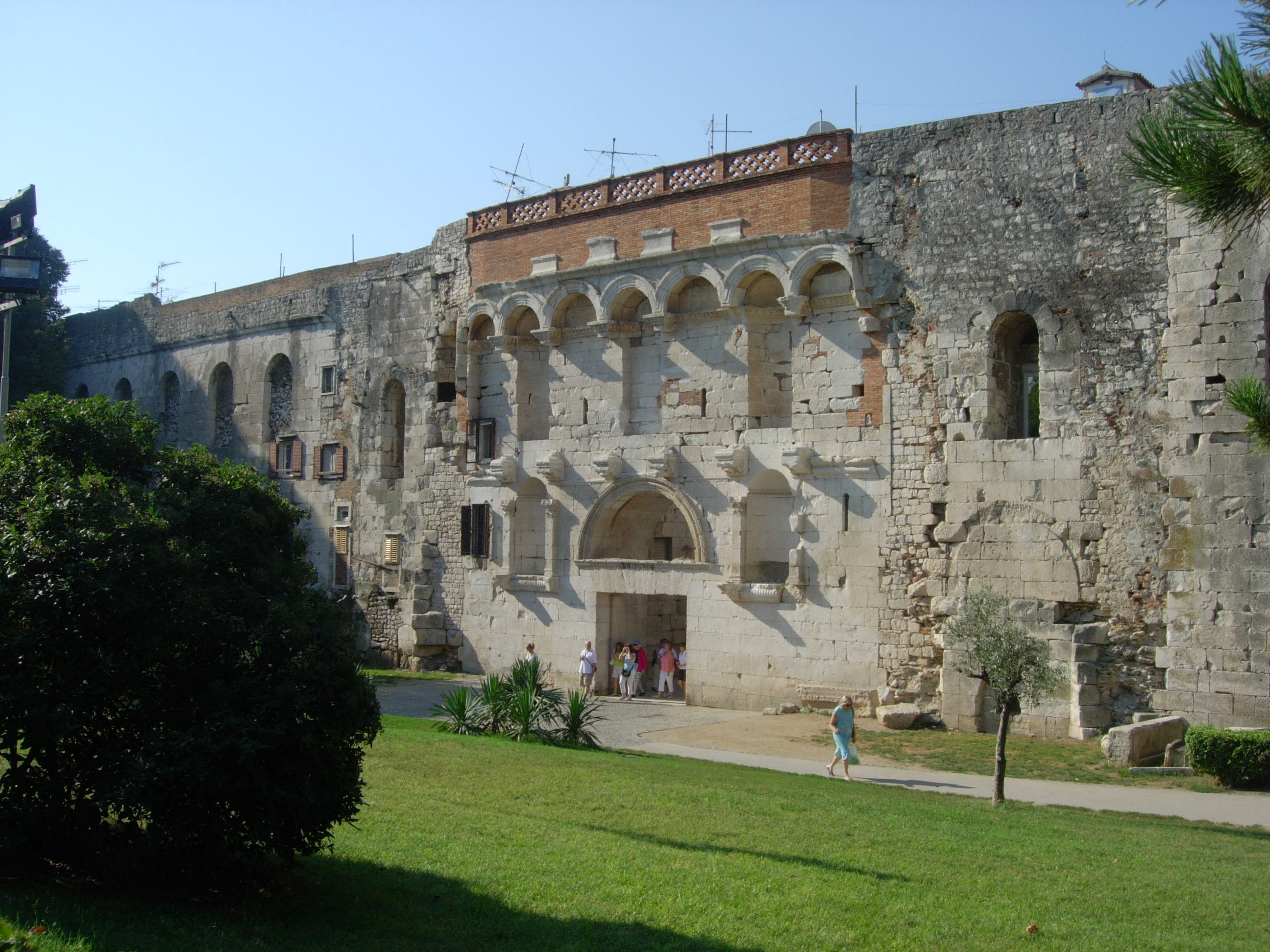
Golden gate, north gate of the palace.

=== The Golden Gate ===
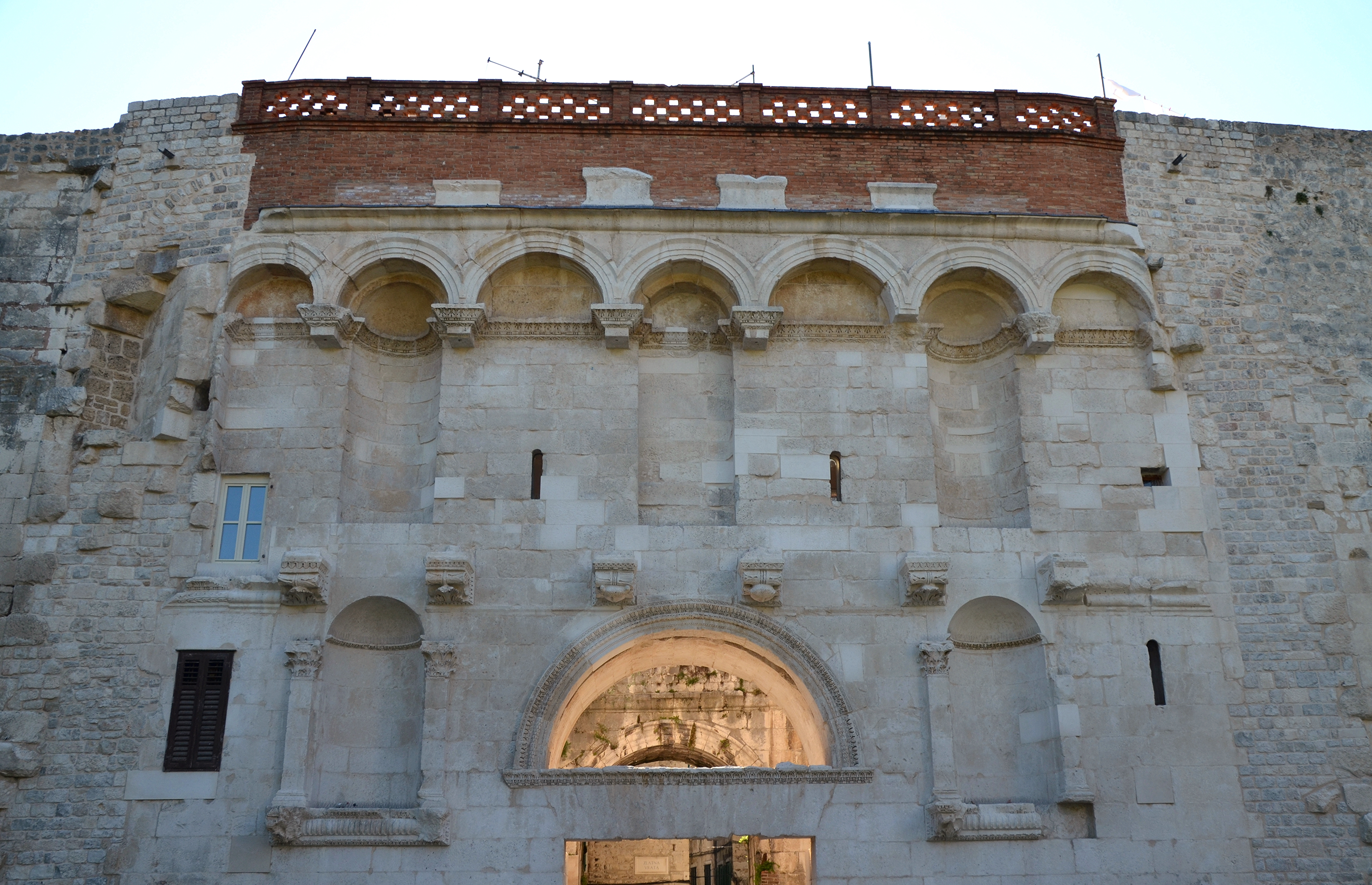
Porta Aurea (detail) in 2013.

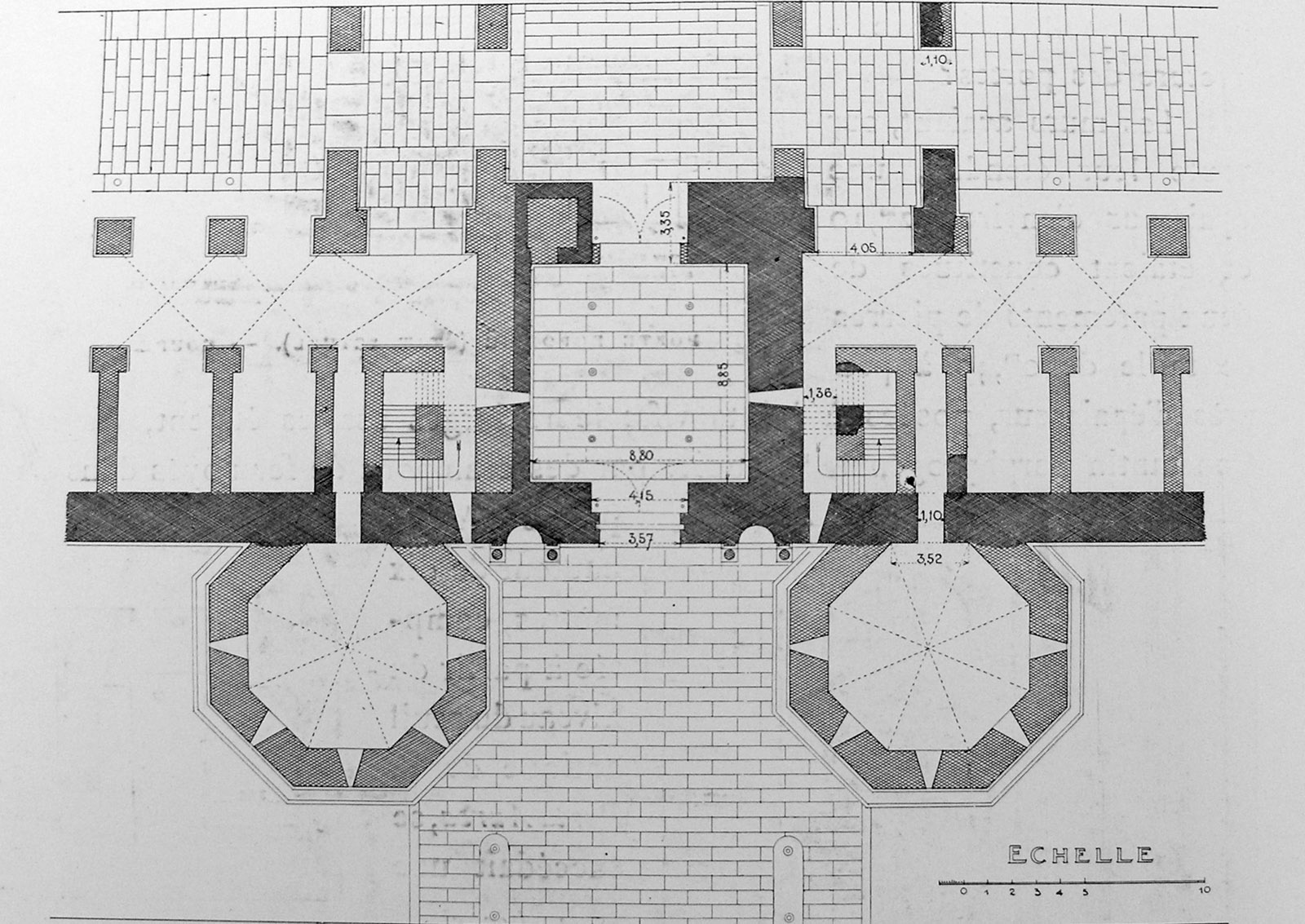
Aurea gate, floorplan.

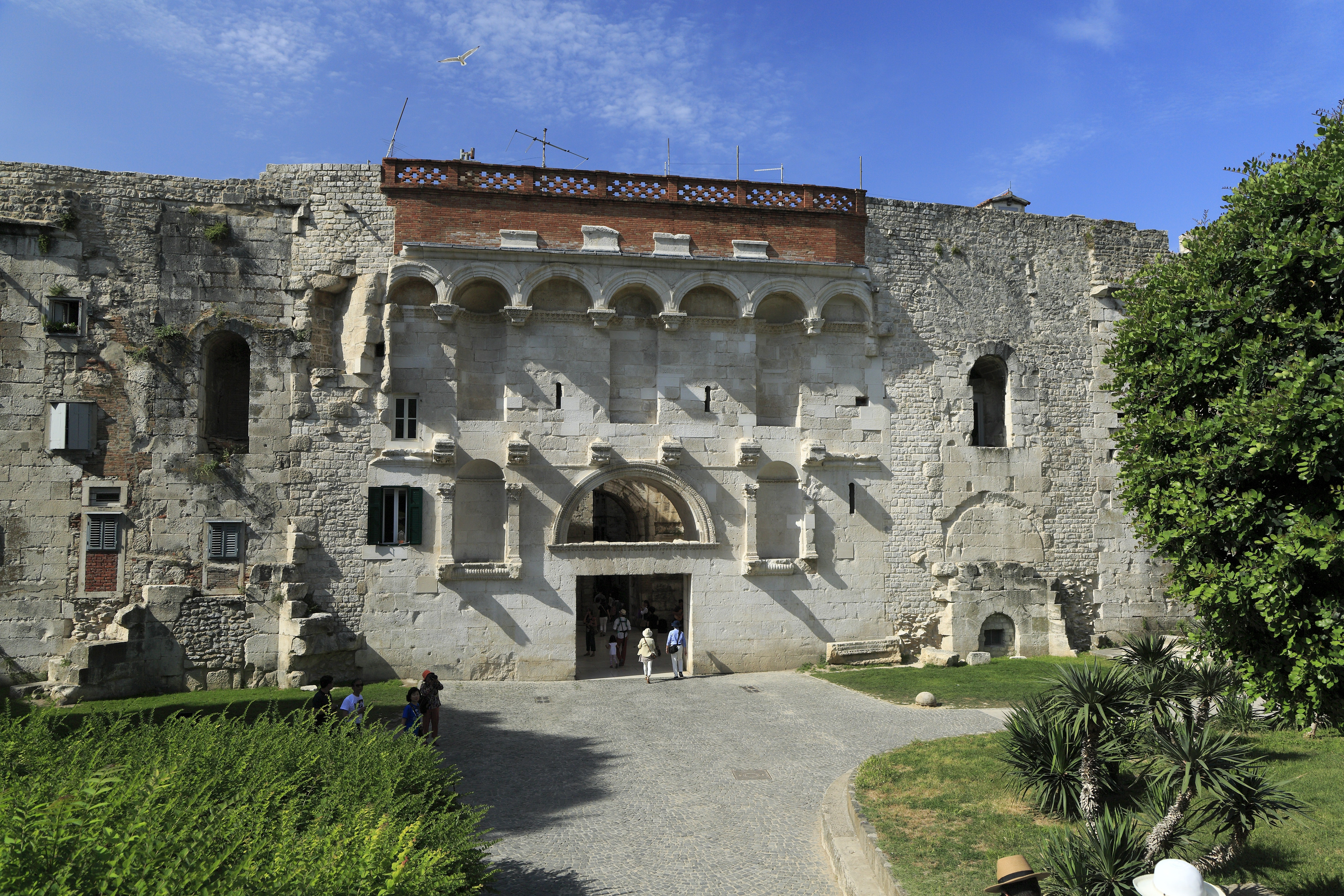
The golden gate.

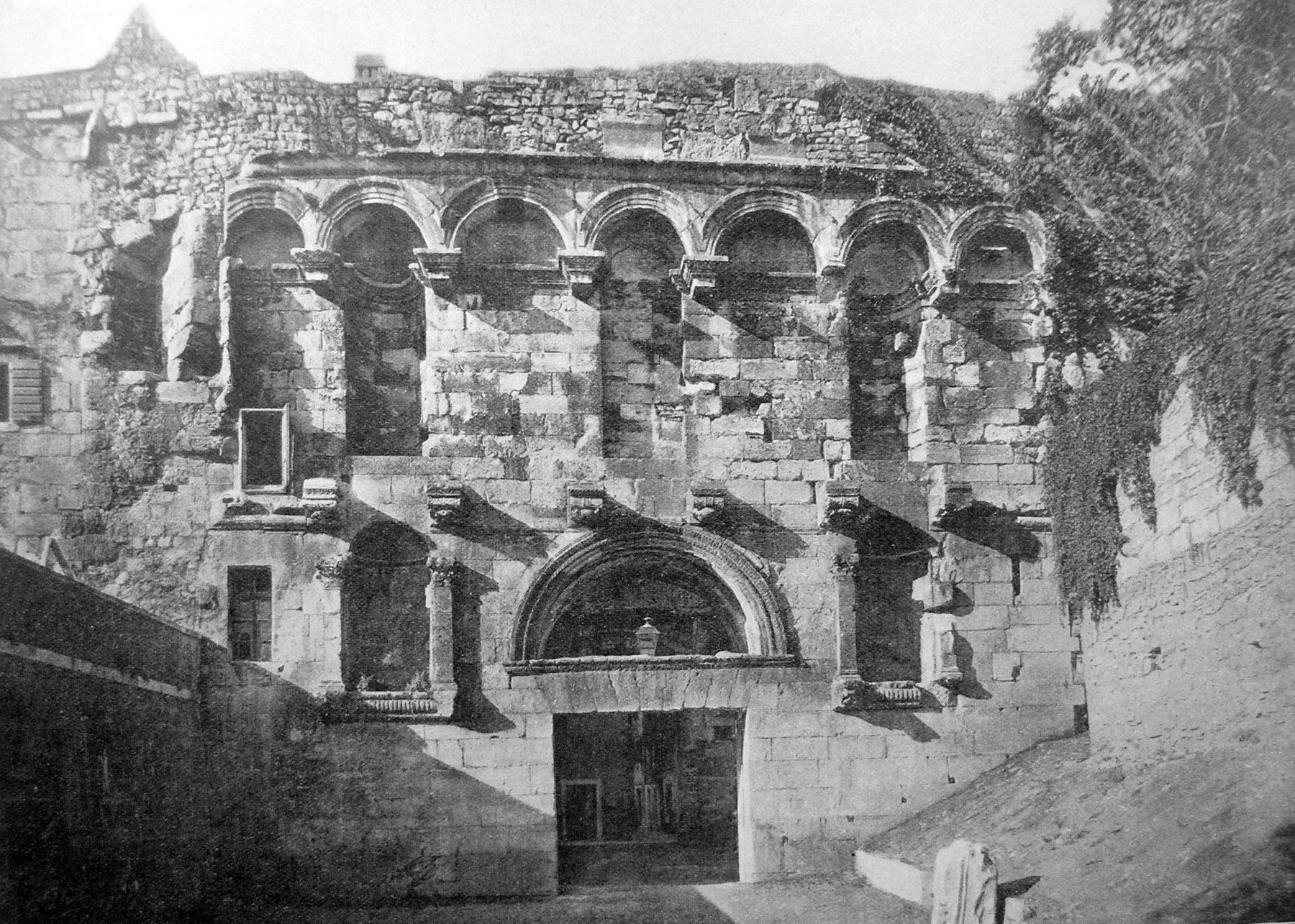
View of The Golden Gate ca. 1910, Photo by E. Hébrard and J. Zeiller, Spalato, le Palais de Dioclétien, Paris, 1912.

=== Diagrams and reconstructions ===
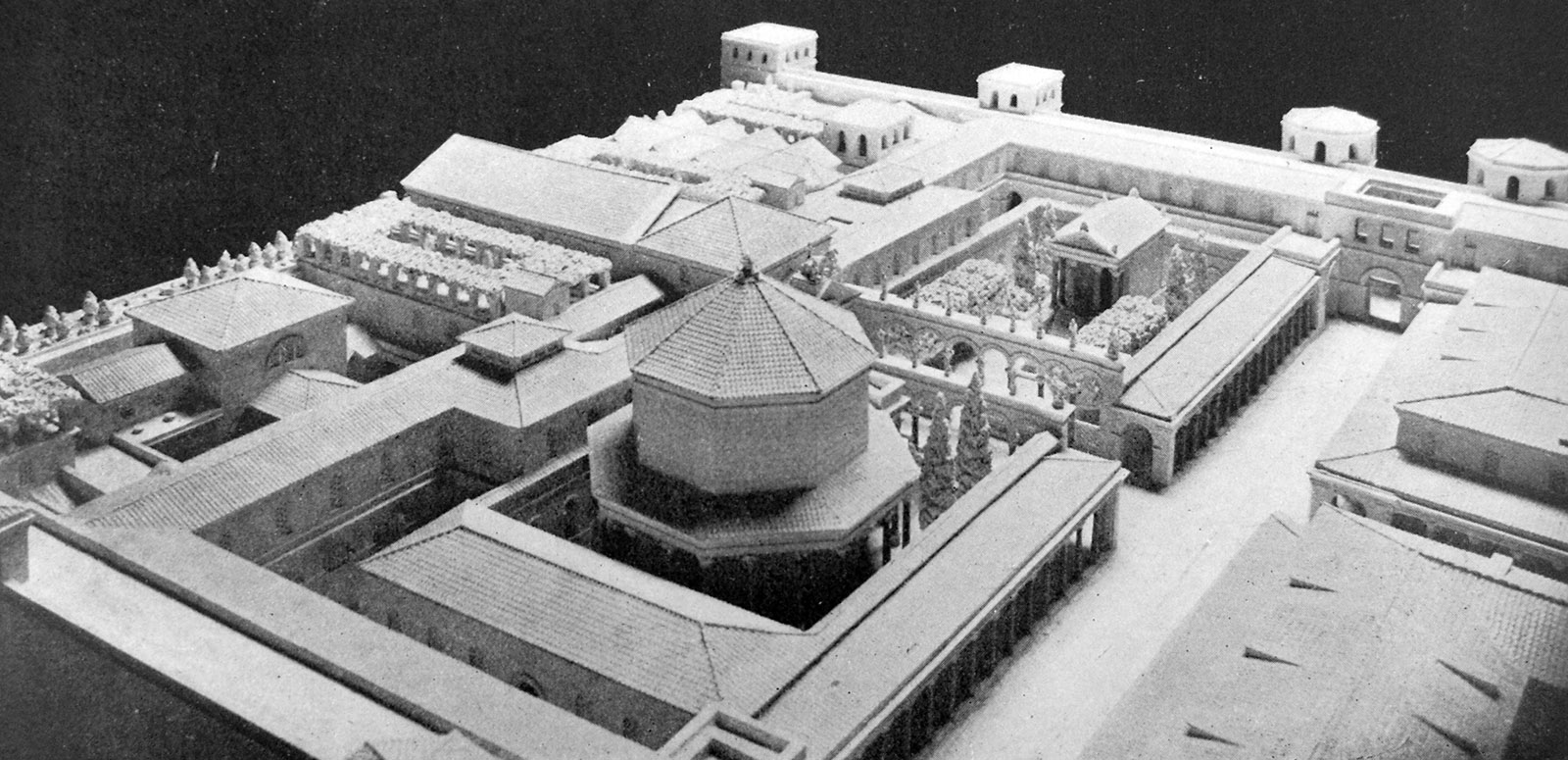
Model of the Palace in its original state.

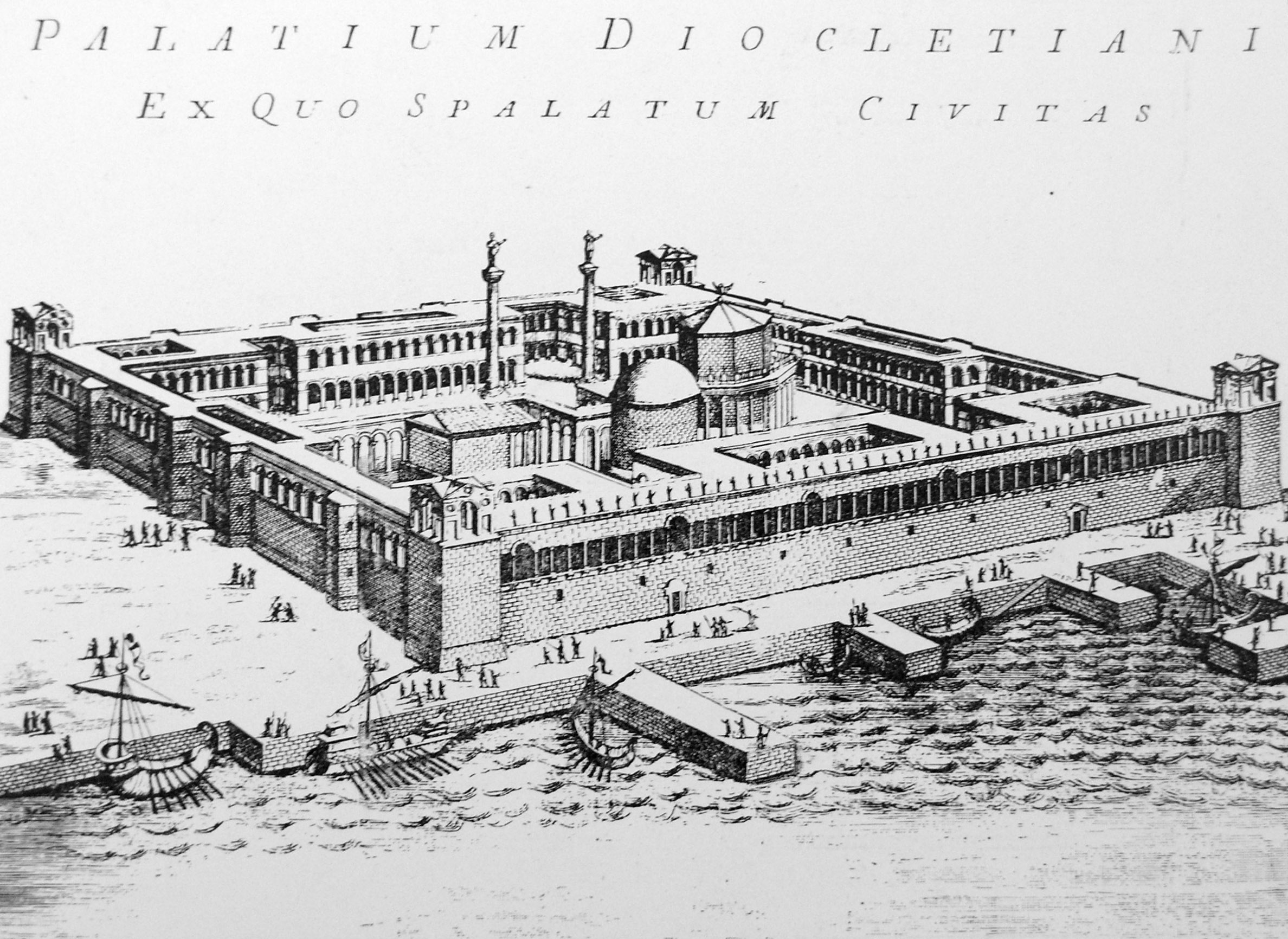
Reconstruction by Farlatija.

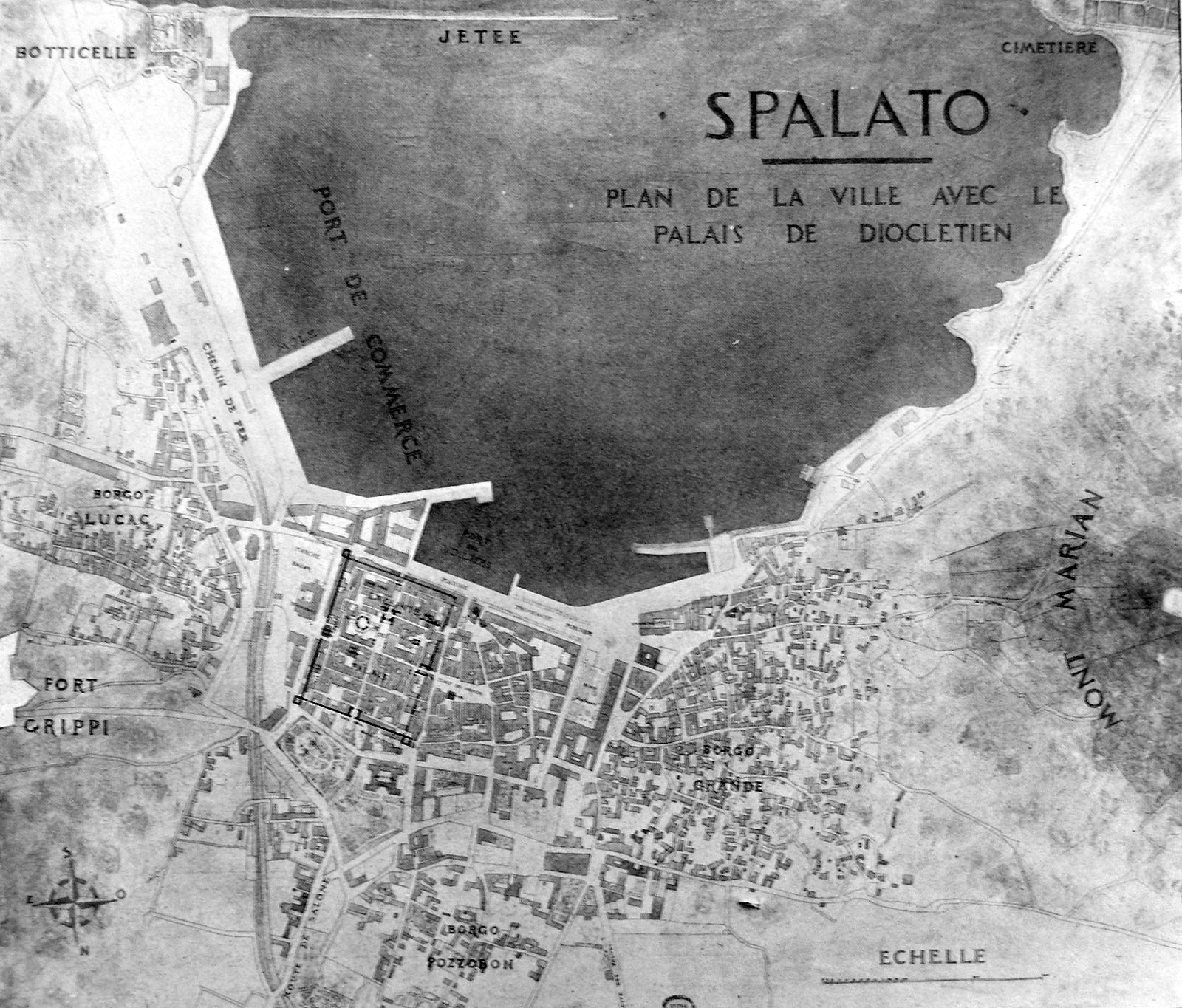
General plan of Split in 1912.

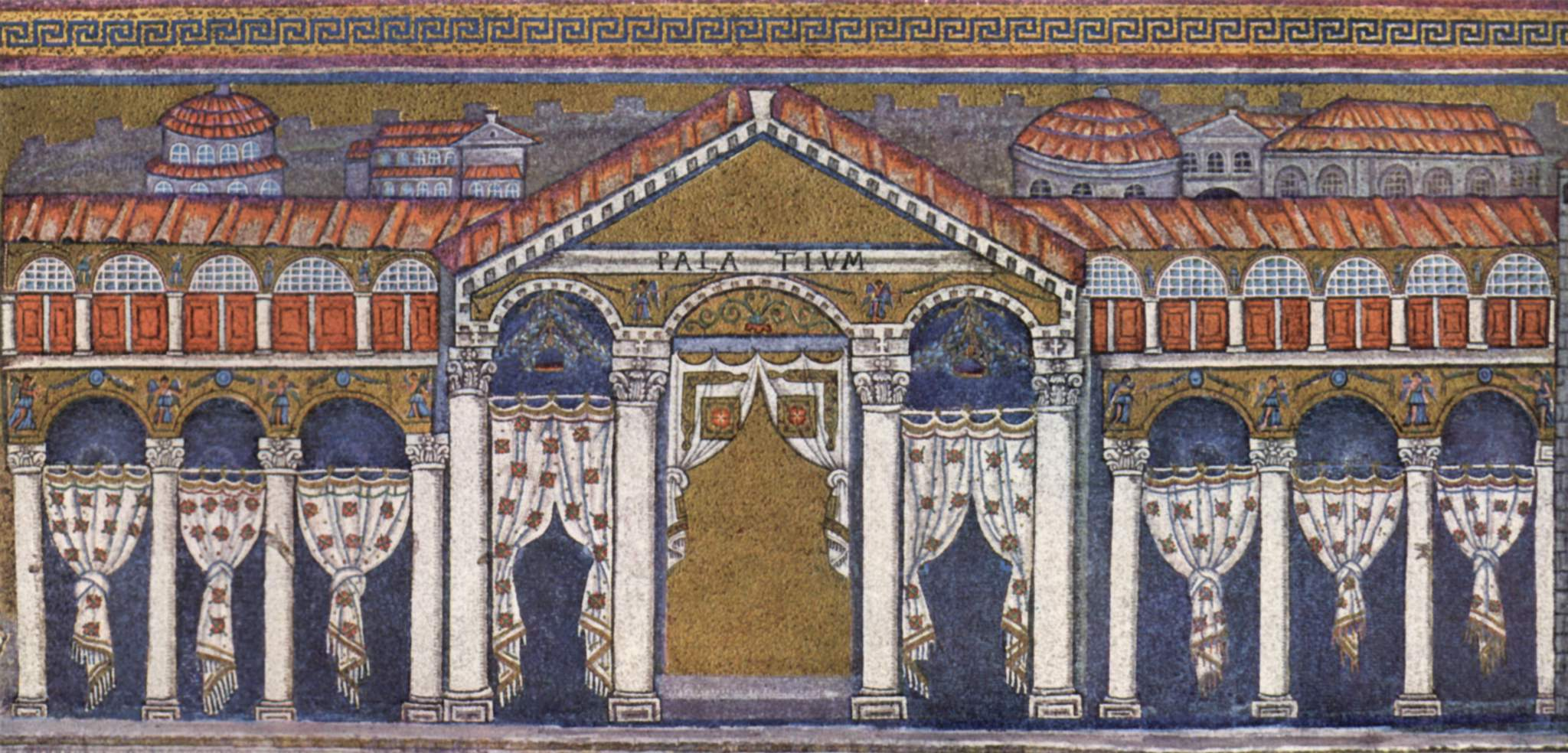
Representation of the facade of the palace of Theodoric the Great from Ravenna on a mosaic from the Basilica Sant'Apollinare nuovo.

=== Temple ===
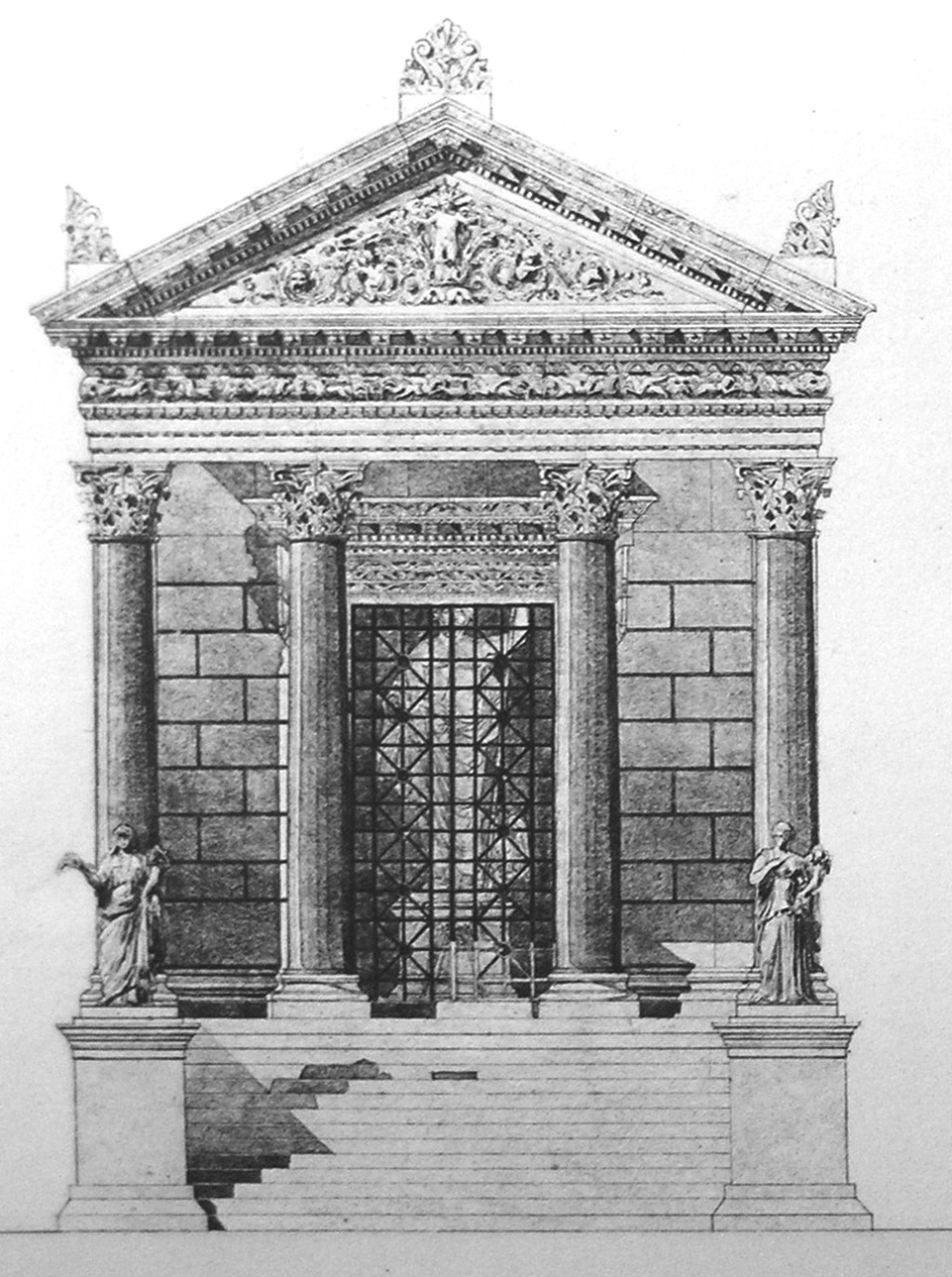
Reconstruction of Jupiter's Temple (now St. John's Church).

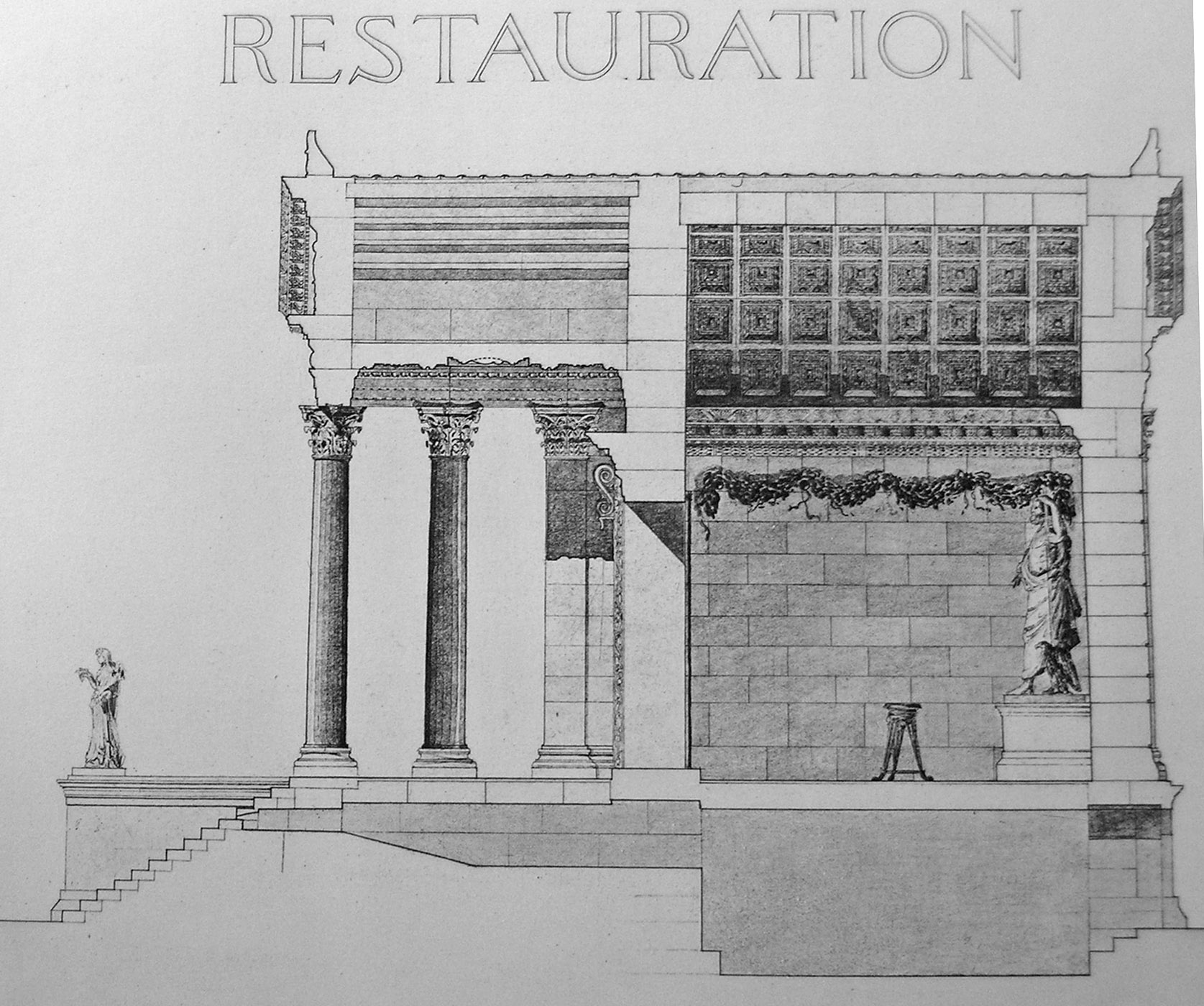
Cutaway reconstruction drawing by E. Hébrard, showing the temple's vaulted interior.

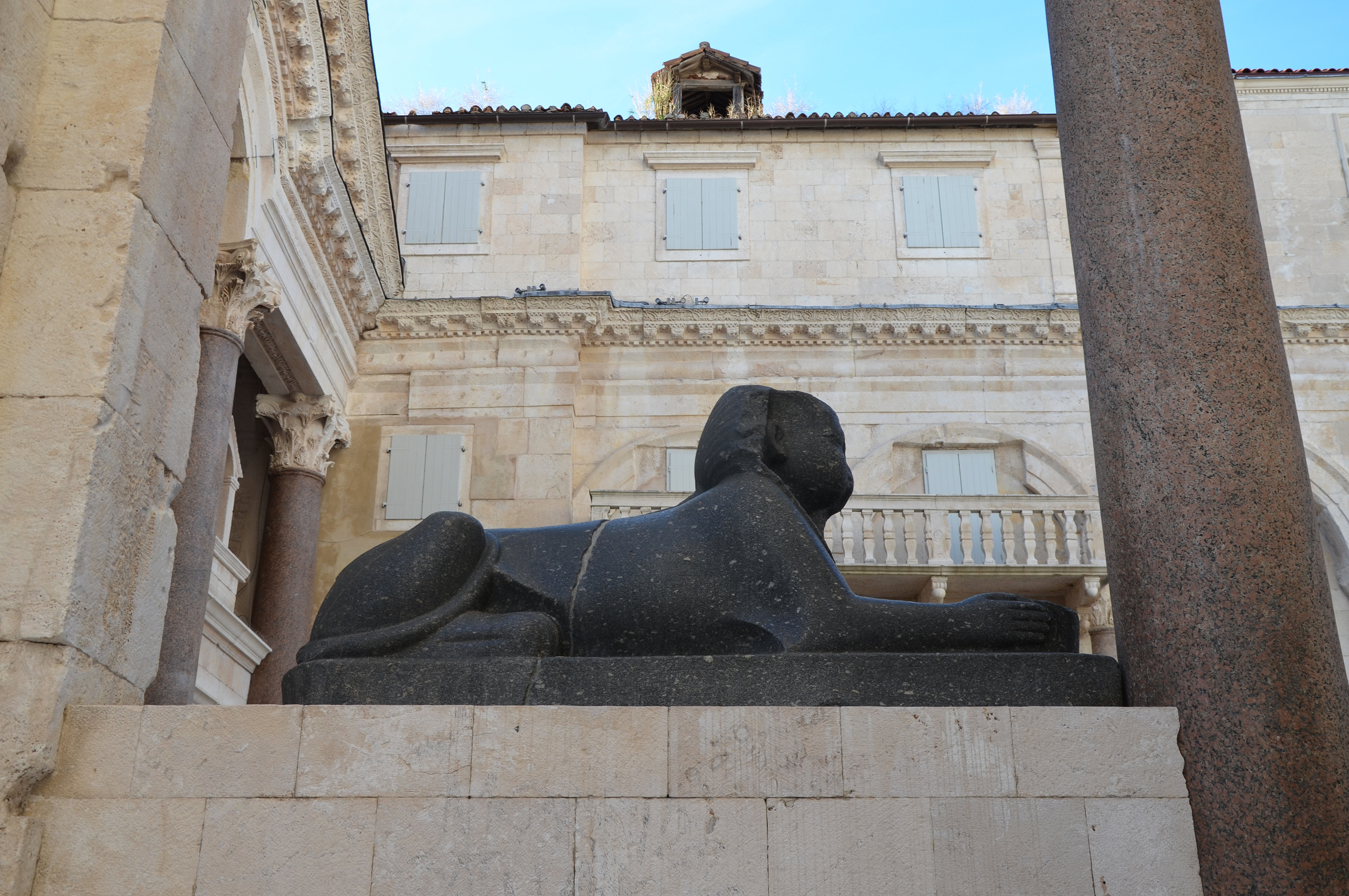
Granite sphinx of Ramses II. 3,500 years old, it comes from the site of Pharaoh Thutmose III. The other two Sphinxes can be found in the Temple of Jupiter in Diocletian's Palace, and in the Split Museum.

=== Mausoleum ===
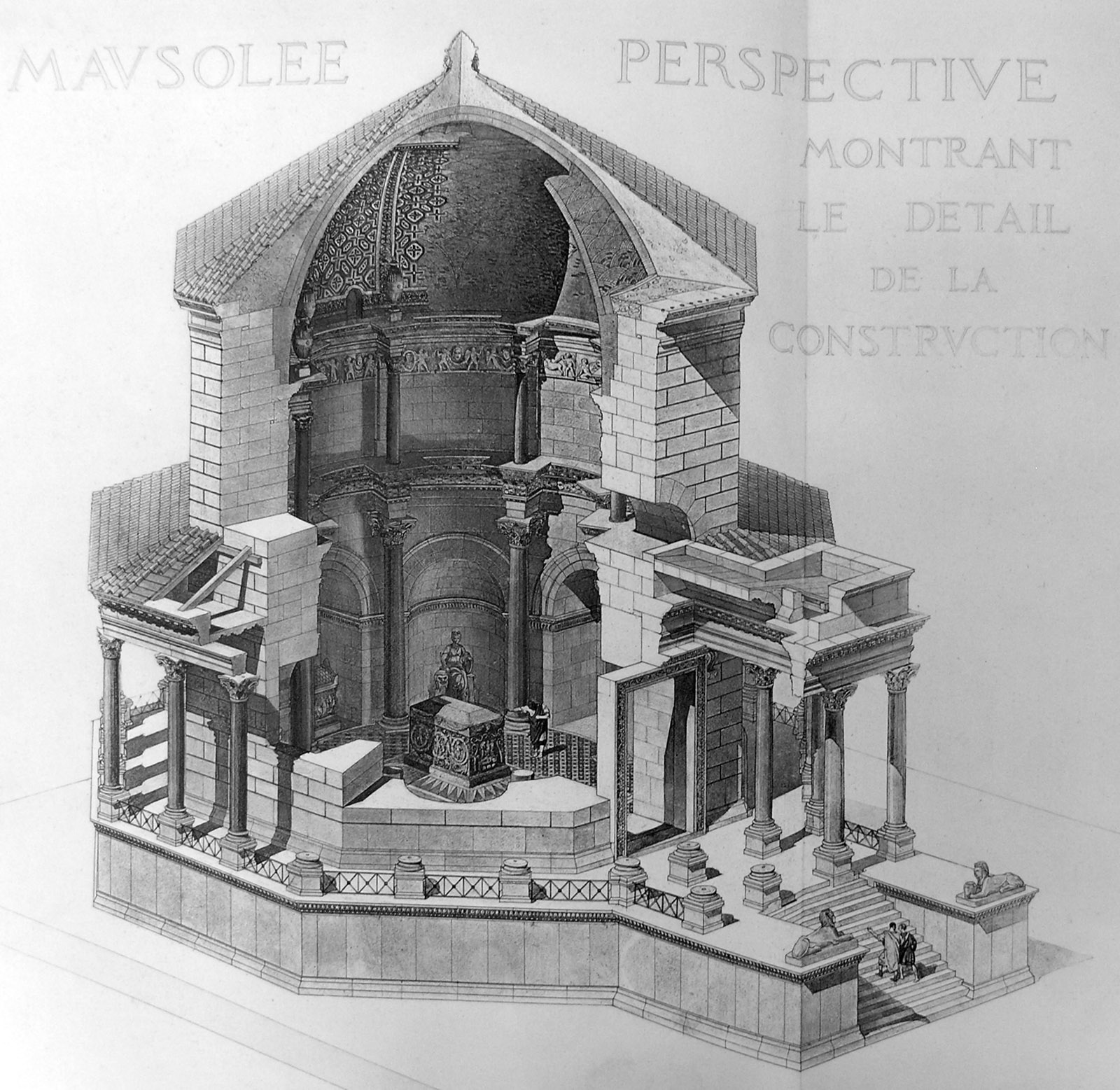
3D mausoleum cross-section.

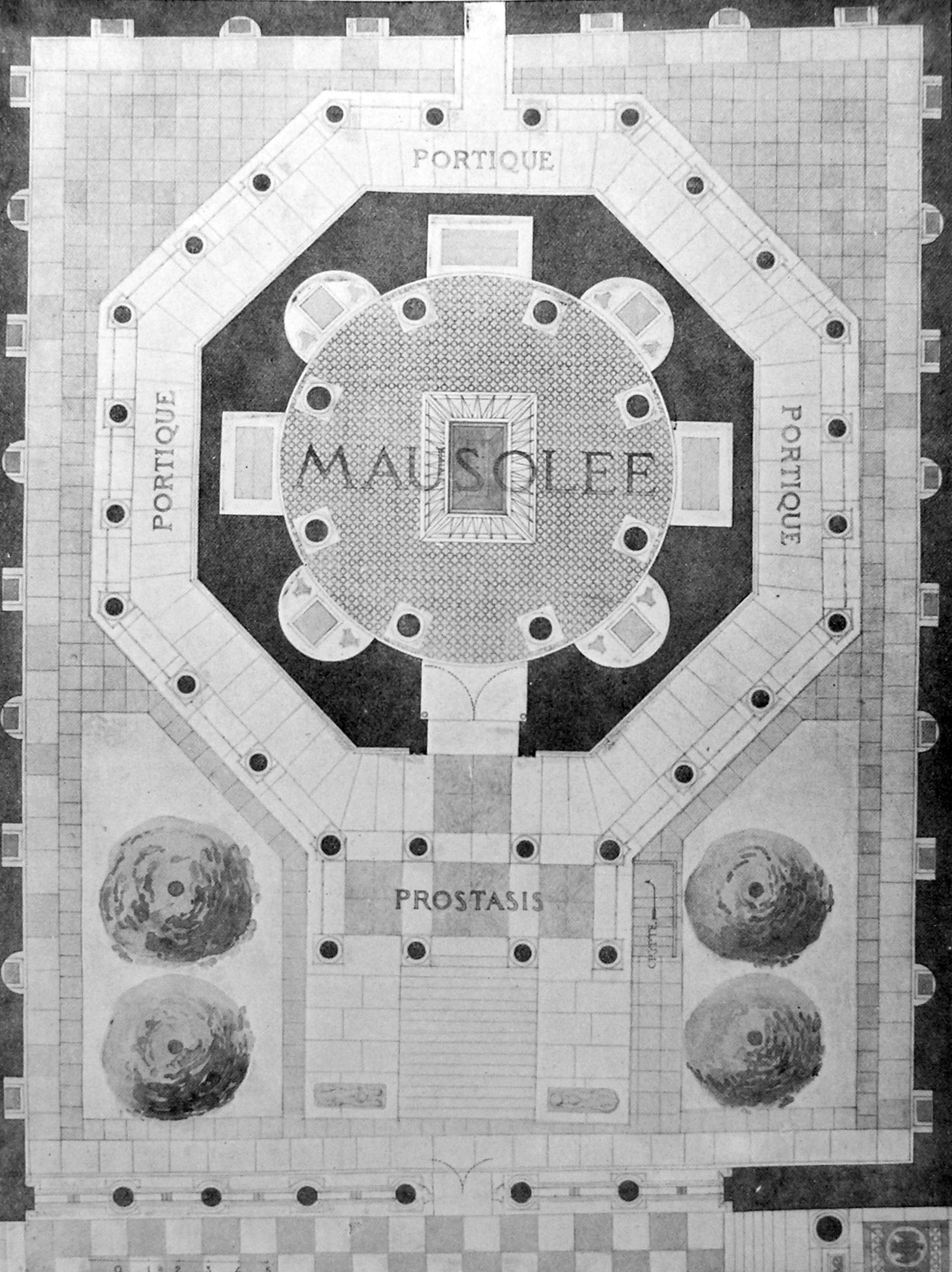
Mausoleum Layout.

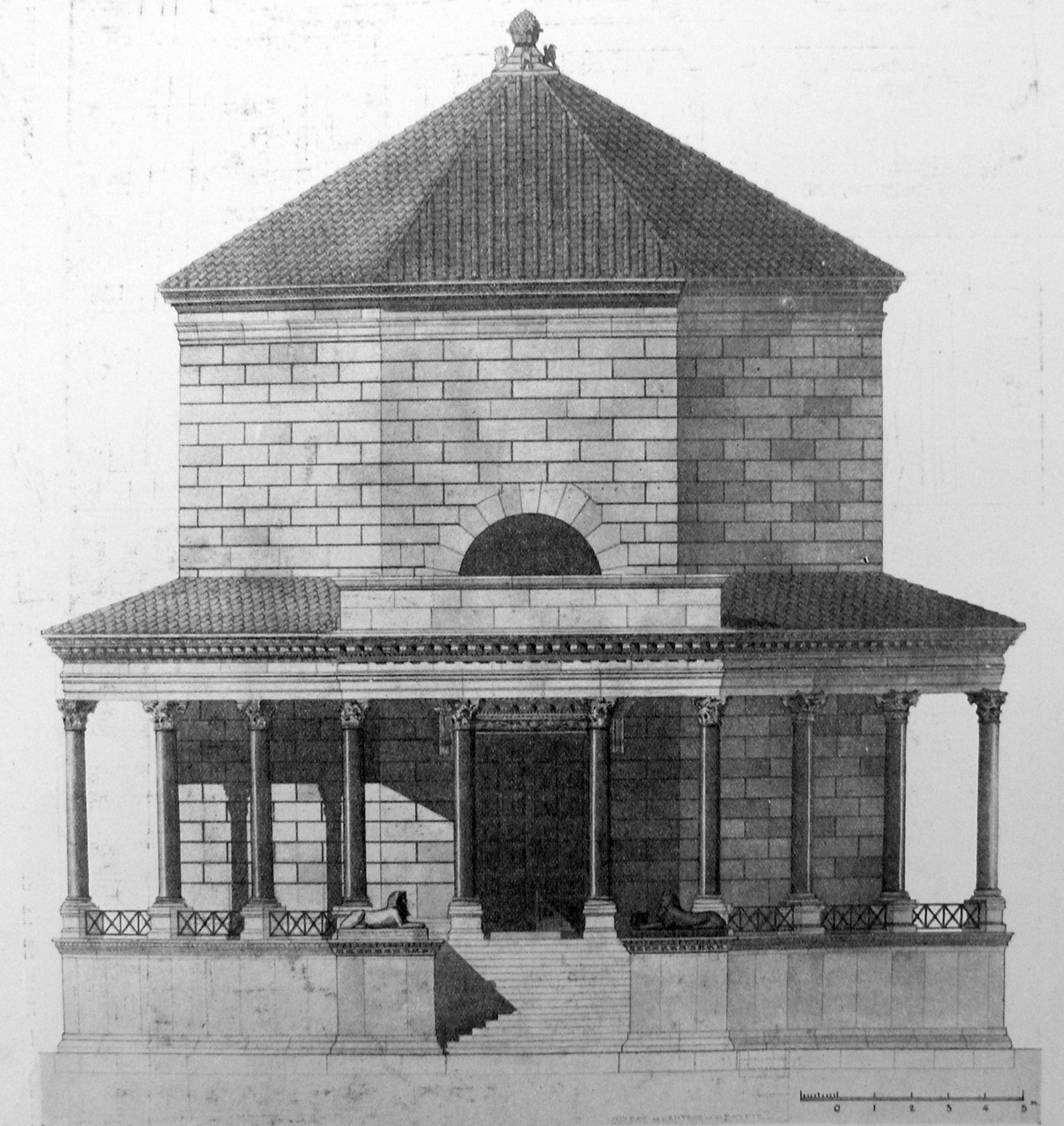
Facade of the mausoleum.

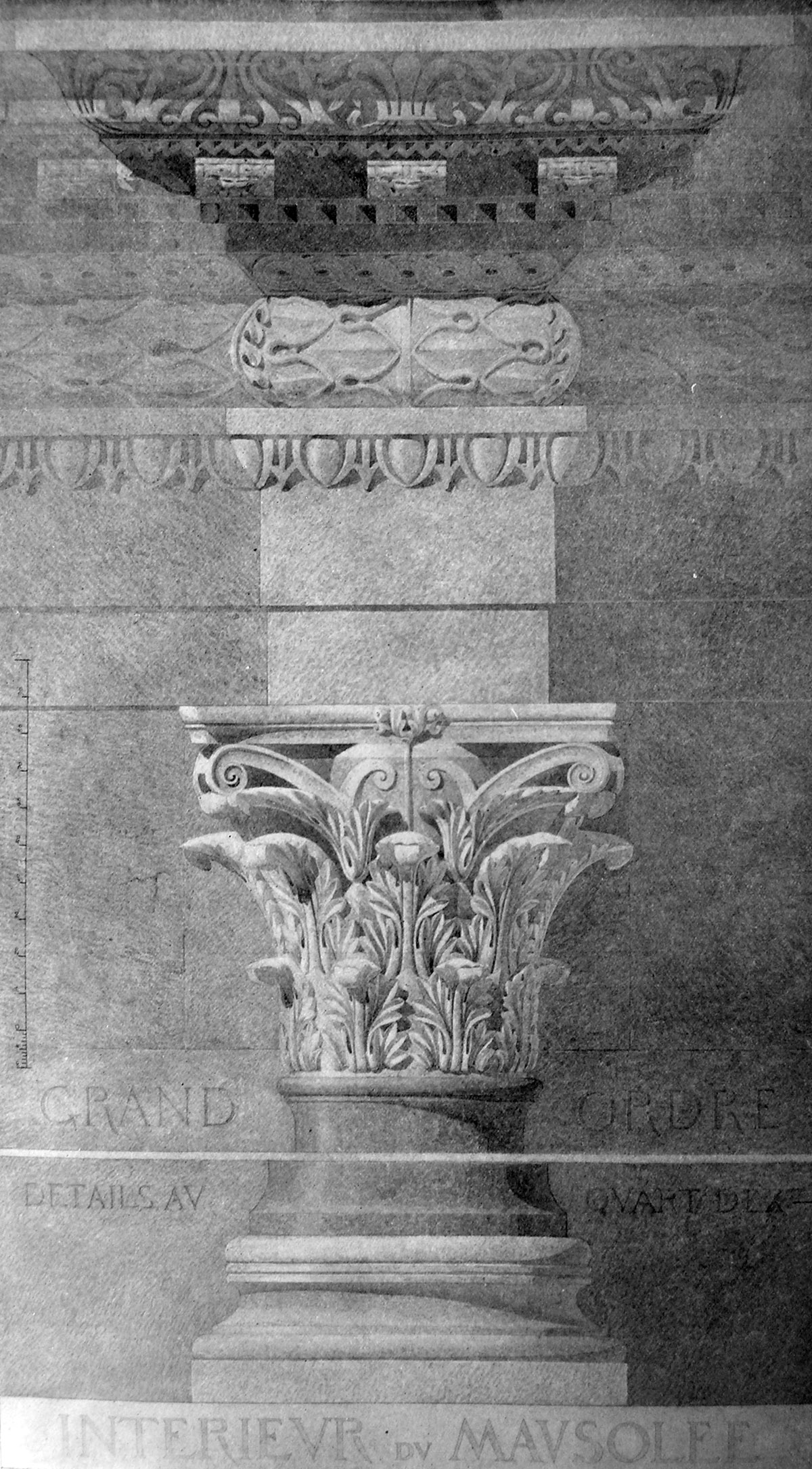
Pillar from the mausoleum, collapsed drawing.

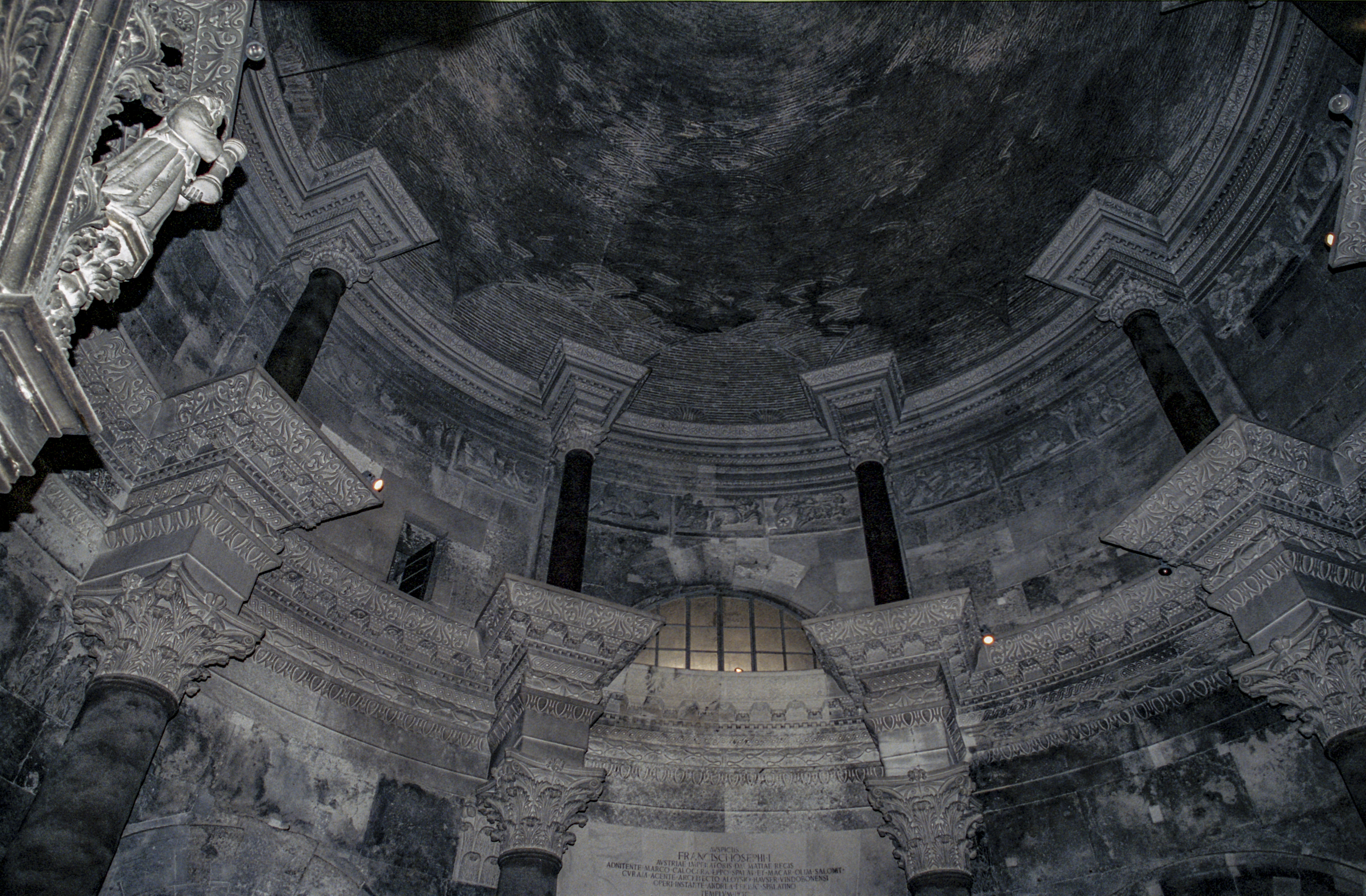
Interior view of the dome of the Mausoleum: you can see the brick vault keys.

=== Church/Cathedral ===
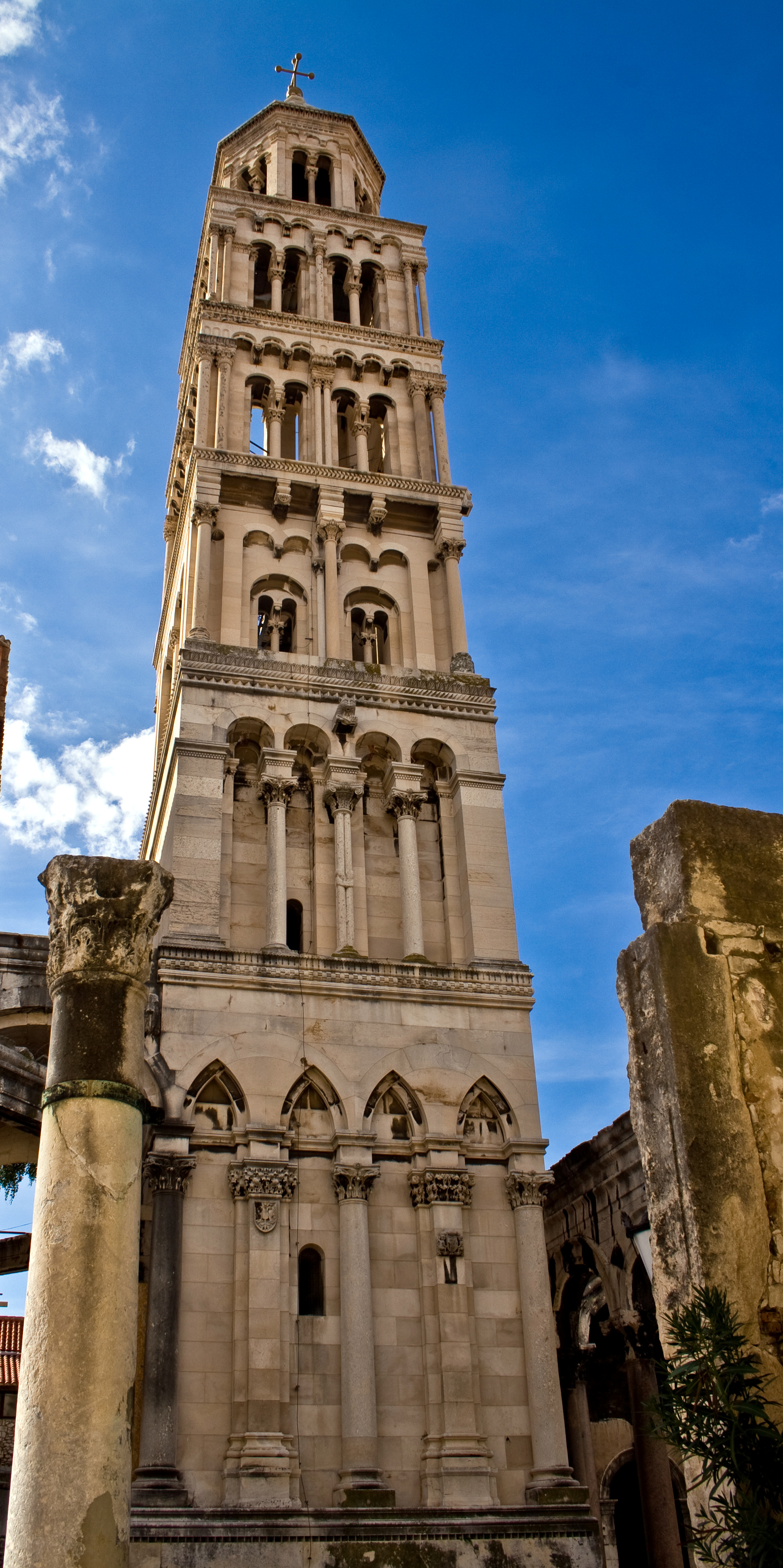
Campanile of Split Cathedral.

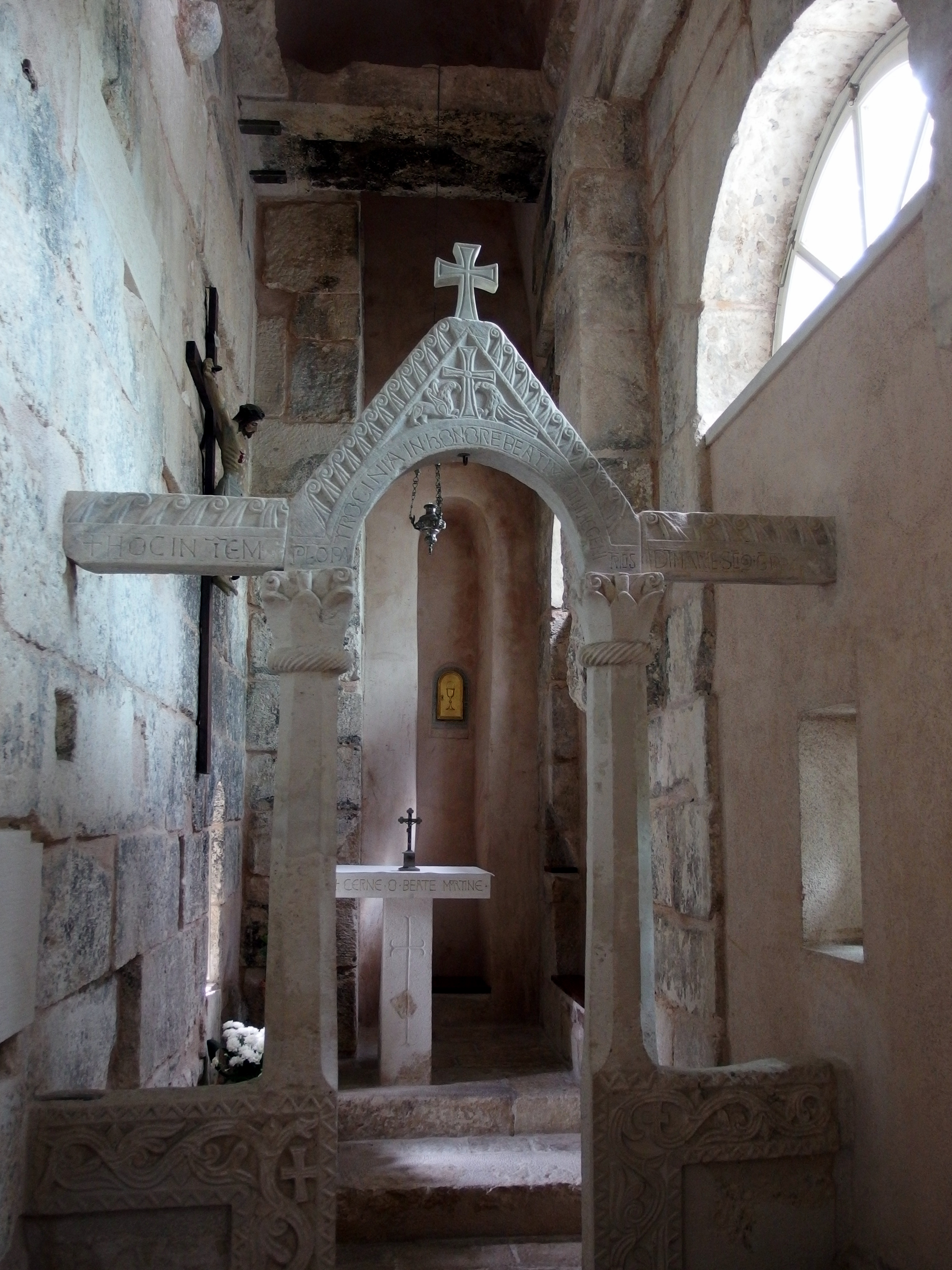
Interior image of the Church of St Martin's with a view of the chancel screen (June 2013).

=== Cellars and underground complex of the Palace ===
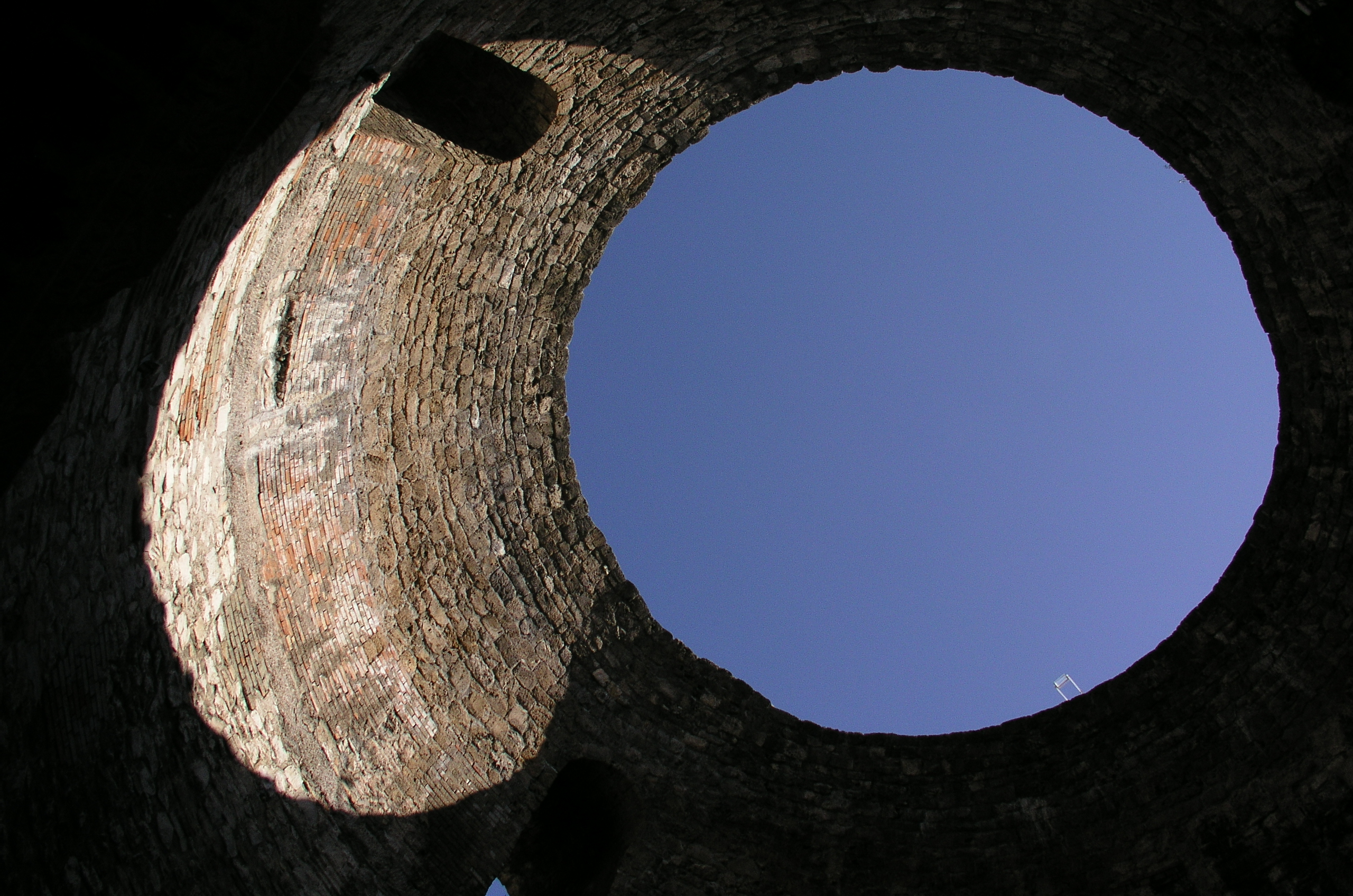
The Vestibule leading to the cellars of the Palace.

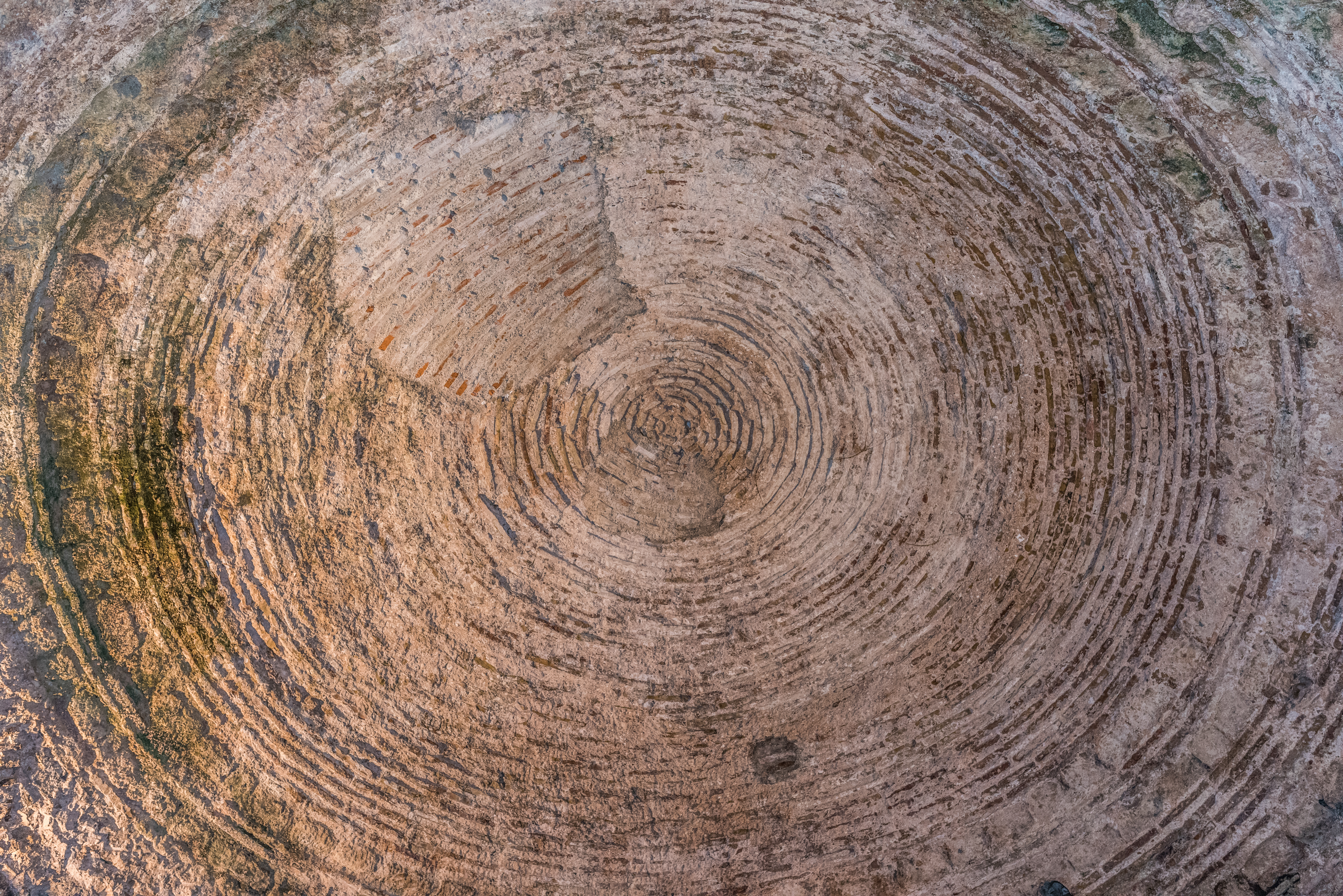
Cellars of Diocletian's Palace.

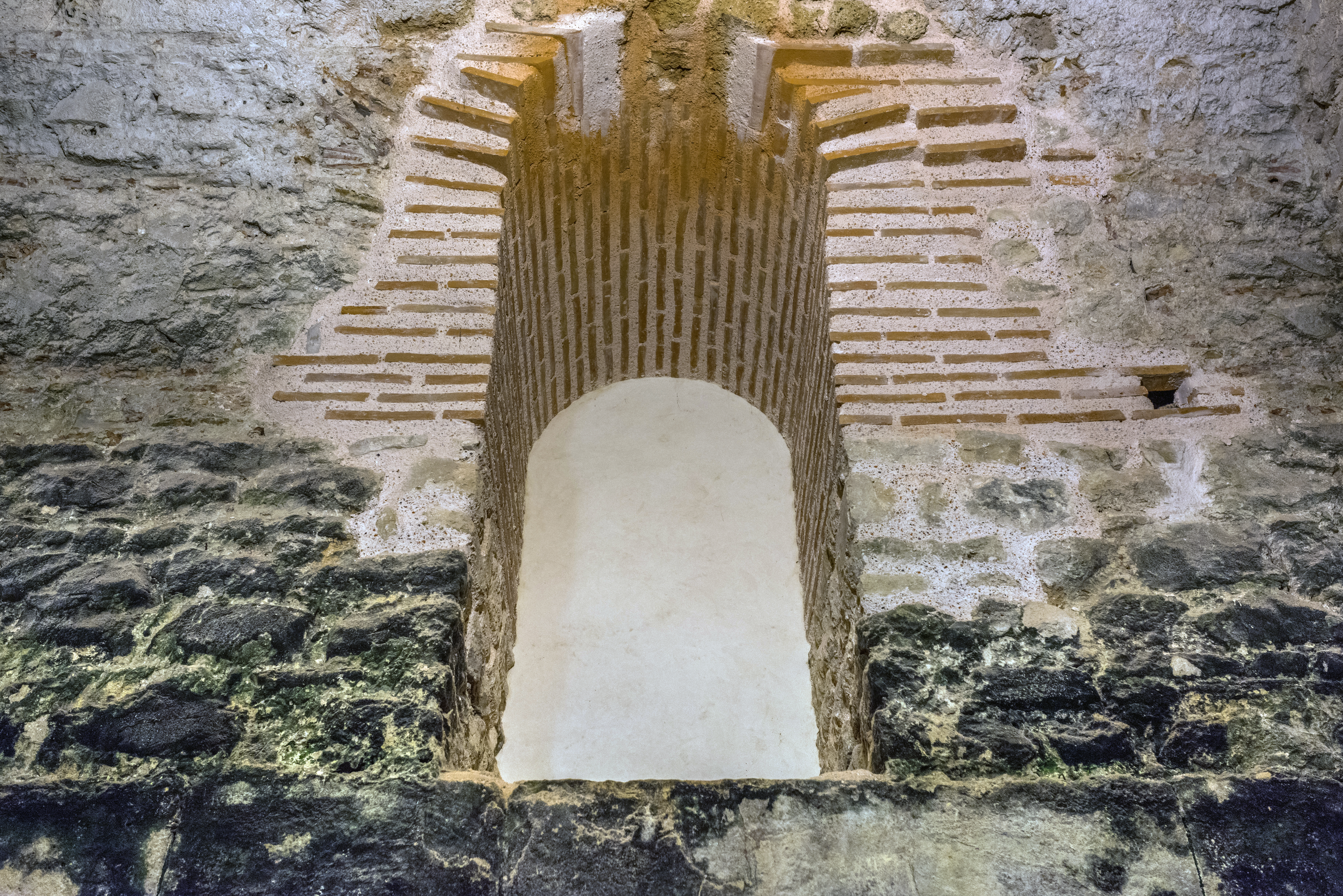
Cellars of Diocletian's Palace

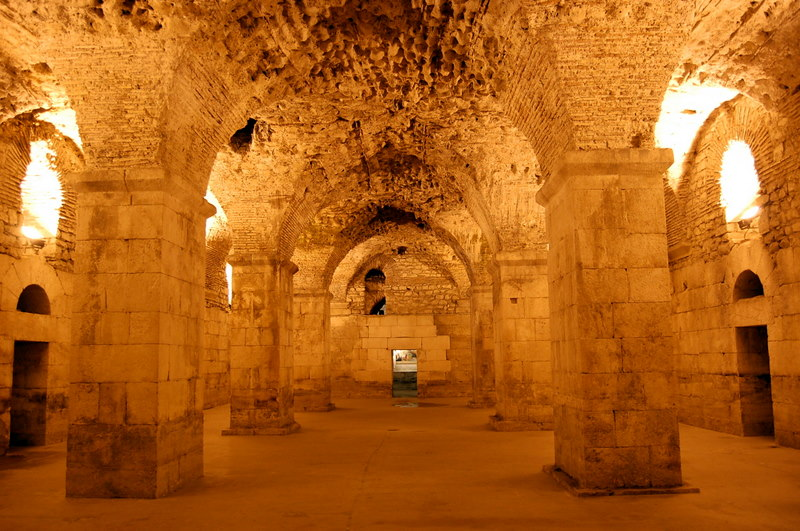
The cellars of Diocletian's palace are like a peristyle (above) a place of frequent occurrences.

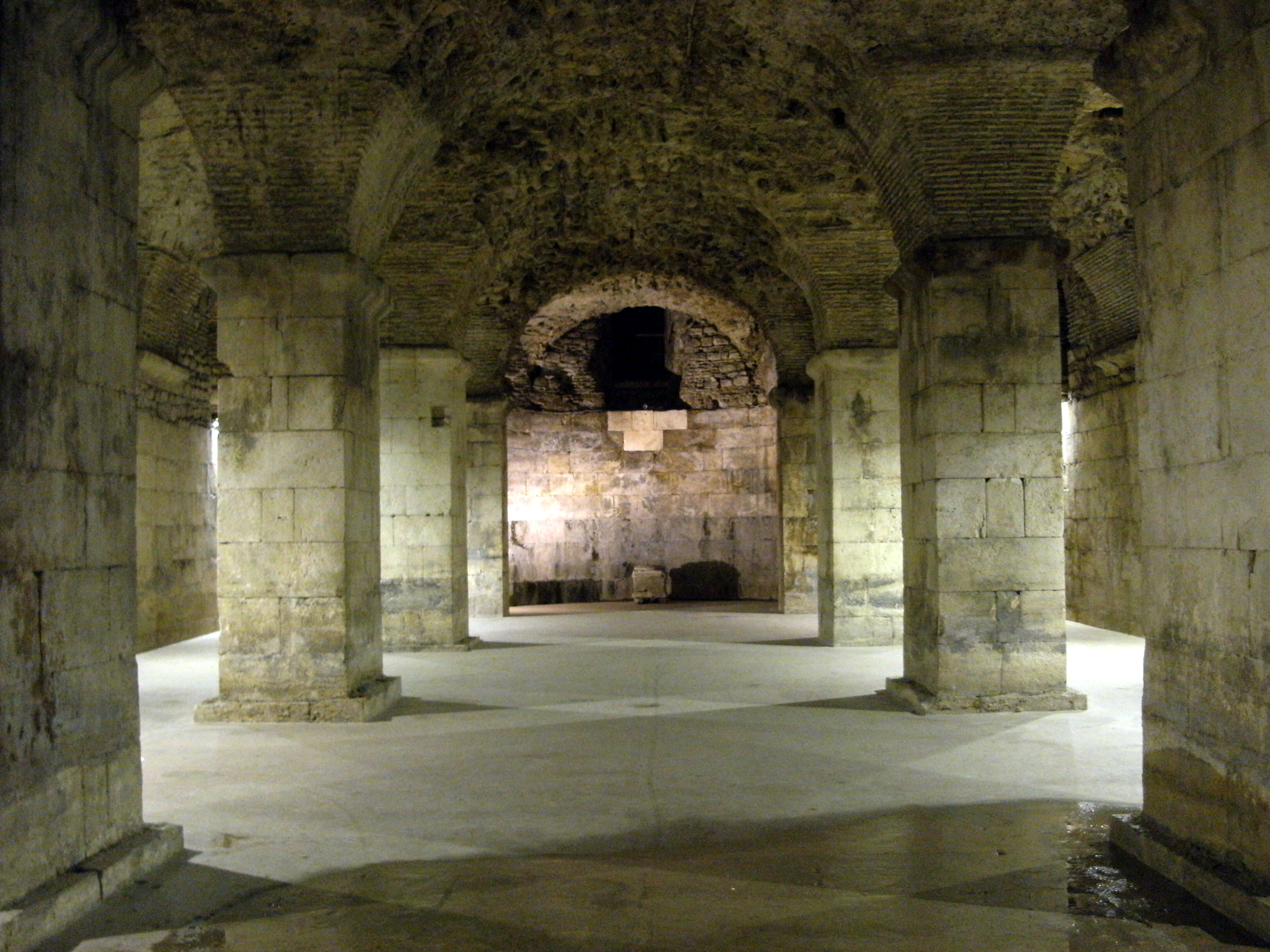
Part of the underground palace complex.

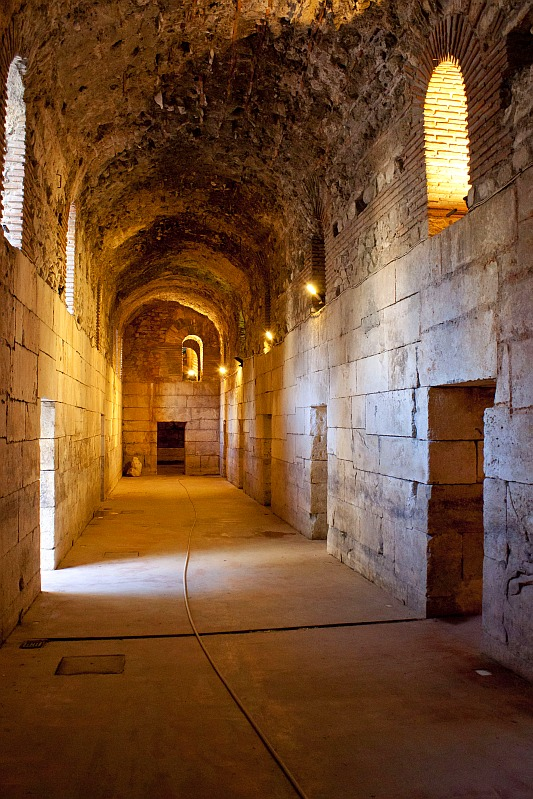
East wing of the underground complex.

== See also ==
- List of Roman domes
- Red Peristyle (an act of urban intervention done on the main square of the palace)
- Diocletian Aqueduct
- Roman architecture
- Marjan, Split
- List of World Heritage Sites in Croatia
