= Church of Our Lady of the Belfry =

- The Belltower of the Church of Our Lady of Zvonik
- Crkva Gospe od Zvonika u Splitu
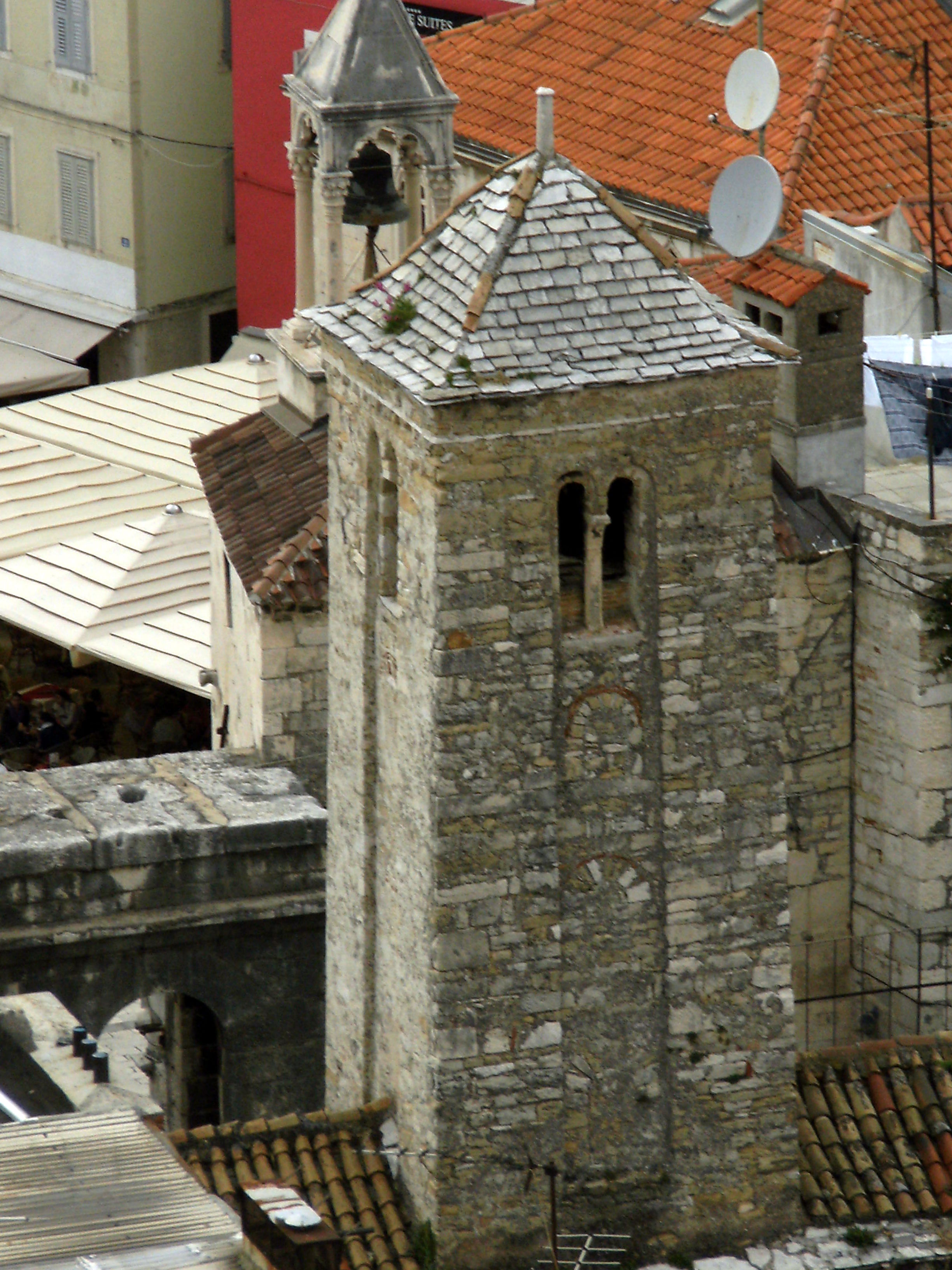
- The Belltower of the Church of Our Lady of Zvonik (June 2013)
- Church of Our Lady of the Belfry
- 43°30′31″N 16°26′21″E
- Location: Split
- Country: Croatia
- Denomination: Roman Catholic
- Previous denomination: Chalcedonian Christianity
- Tradition: Roman Rite

History
- Status: Open
- Dedication: Our Lady
- Consecrated: 6th century

Architecture
- Functional status: Non-Active
- Heritage designation: National Monument
- Architect: Unknown
- Architectural type: Church Belltower
- Style: Pre-Romanesque
- Groundbreaking: 6th century (within a 4th-century structure) renovated (11th century)

Specifications
- Materials: stone

Administration
- Parish: Split

Clergy
- Priest: None

The Belltower of the Church of Our Lady of the Belfry (Croatian: Crkva Gospe od Zvonika u Splitu) is a disused Roman Catholic church in Split, Croatia. Built into a small space (an early guardhouse) within the ancient Iron Gate of Diocletian's western wall. Today little survives of the building, apart from the belltower, one of the oldest in Croatia.

== History ==
The remains of The Church Our Lady of Zvonik, located over a cavity of the west wall above the Porta Aurea of Diocletian's Palace. That space, in the time of Diocletian (285-305), was a narrow corridor that was once used as a guardhouse. The space was converted into the church sometime in the 6th century when the complex saw an influx of refugees from outlying communities. During this expansion of the city, the Iron Gate became an internal link between the old and the new part, although, in the beginning, it was the main entrance to the city. These doors matched in shape with the Porta argentea; however, they are better preserved. The inner courtyard and sections of the octagonal towers on the outside are remarkably well-preserved. Dedicated initially to St. Theodore, similar churches exist/existed over the Golden Gate and the Bronze Gate. The old church, which is probably older than its pre-Romanesque phase, the cross-domed vaults and the pre-Romanesque bell tower, the oldest in the city and one of the oldest in the Adriatic, have been almost entirely preserved. The original statue of the winged goddess Nike was stolen/destroyed in the middle of the lintel, and a Cross was carved in its place, probably in the 7th century.

On 4 March 852 Trpimir issued a charter in Biaći (in loco Byaci dicitur) in the Latin language, confirming Mislav's donations to the Archbishopric in Split. The charter (preserved in a copy from 1568) documents Trpimir named himself "by the mercy of God, Duke of the Croats" (Latin: Dux Chroatorum iuvatus munere divino) and his realm as the "Realm of the Croats" (Regnum Chroatorum). The term regnum was used by other rulers of that time as a sign of their independence and did not necessarily mean a kingdom. In the 11th century, the interior was divided into three vaulted transepts with a cross vault. An early Romanesque bell tower was erected above the central transept, the oldest preserved tower on the Adriatic coast. From the same period are fragments of an altar partition with an inscription mentioning the city prior to Furmin (Firmina) and his first and second wives, Magi and Bitu, as donors. Furmin is first mentioned at the Synod of Split held in 1088/89 and the Sumpetar Cartulary. Thus, the nobleman who ruled Split during the time of the influential Archbishop Lovro and in the fateful events after the death of King Zvonimir.

During the church's remodelling, a small part of an early Romanesque altarpiece was unearthed and reinstalled as an internal frame of a Gothic window. These artistic decorations and the contents of the inscriptions also found on the architrave and the gable testify that it is an 11th-century inscription. They are probably related to construction or equipment. Prior Firmin is a historical figure mentioned in a document from 1089, from the time of King Stephen II. Trpimirovic and nad-Bishop Lovre, so this information determines the origin of this church. Firmin is possibly cited in the famous Supetar cartulary, created during this time. The fact that his two wives are cited within the text does not denote bigamy, as documentation shows he remarried as a widower. Firmin and his wives also wear aristocratic insignia (dominus and domina), which means that they are members of the class that, after the collapse of Byzantine rule, fought for independent power in coastal cities, as was the case in Zadar and Trogir.

The painted Icon of ‘Our Lady of the Bell Tower’ originates from the church and is today kept in the treasury of the Cathedral of St. Dujam. It is the assumed work of ‘The Master of the Crucifix’ from the Monastery of St. Clare and Our Lady of Žnjan as other works originate from a painter from Split or a school that operated at the end of the 13th century. The fact St. Theodore was the protector saint of the Byzantine army and this was probably during the 6th century and Justinian's reconquest of the region strongly suggests this. The church was thoroughly renovated in the 11th century, when it may have received a new title and a new name, and the painting as mentioned above, later commissioned for that church High external stairs lead to the church, which the women of Split climbed, vowing before giving birth. Above the church, a pre-Romanesque bell tower was erected, similar to the church bell tower of the Church of Saint Martin (demolished in the 19th century).

Since 2013, the Croatian Conservation Institute has been conducting research, documentation and conservation-restoration work on the Iron Gate and the Church of Our Lady of the Bell Tower as part of its regular activities, as well as architectural surveying and documentation of the entire complex. In 2018, work began on the interior of the Church of Our Lady of the Bell Tower as part of the renovation project of the Iron Gate. The second phase of works has since been completed, which included constructive rehabilitation and restoration work, replacement of the roof timbers of the Bell Tower, preventive interventions on the medieval fresco on the exterior facade of the church and cleaning, reconstruction and presentation of the medieval niche on the north wall of the propugnakula. A total of HRK 800,000.00 was set aside for the works in the second phase. The Ministry of Culture and Media of the Republic of Croatia and the City of Split provide financial resources for the project. Newly found medieval sculptures were installed in a niche on the north wall of the Propugnacula. The goal of the intervention is to improve the condition of the widespread zone of the old city centre with minimal and controlled interventions and, at the same time, revitalize the entire Western Gate complex. Today, it has no religious function.

== Architecture ==
Today what remains is the 11th-century early Romanesque bell tower (dated in terms of construction and stylistic features), that once stood above the central transept. It has a slender but closed wall mass, on which, in addition to small windows, one before stands out on each side of the upper floor, representing a transitional form between pre-Romanesque and Romanesque. Today, it has no religious function.
