= Cellars of Diocletian's Palace =

World Heritage Site in Split, Croatia

The Cellars of Diocletian's Palace
- Podrumi Dioklecijanove palače (Croatian)
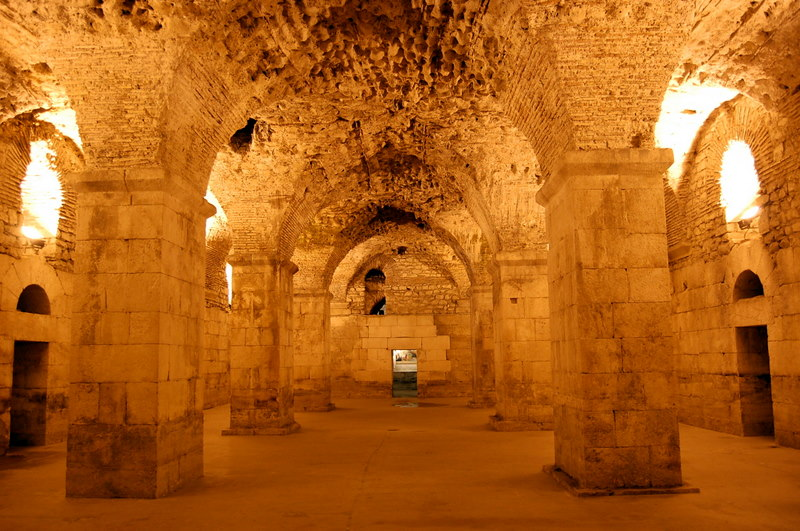
- Cellars of Diocletian's palace (2009)

- Location within Croatia
- 43°30′30″N 16°26′24″E
- Location: Split, Croatia

History
- Built: 4th century AD
- Built by: Diocletian

Site notes
- Architectural style: Roman

The Cellars of Diocletian's Palace, sometimes referred to as the "basement halls", is a set of substructures, located at the southern end of Diocletian's Palace (now the southernmost part of Split's Old Town), that once held up the private apartments of Emperor Diocletian and represents one of the best preserved ancient complexes of their kind in the world.

== History ==
Archeological research on the substructures over the past 70 years has revealed evidence of new structures, predating the palace by two centuries. These early Imperial Period walls are not yet fully understood. There is also an extensive network of water wells (later used in Middle Ages).

During the later Roman empire, the function of the cellars was partly to elevate the Emperor's chambers on the floor above, but they were also the storage area for foodstuffs and wine for the Palace. Actually, a remnant of a large press, which was used in the wine production is still visible, and on display today. Being structurally a faithful replica of the chambers above, they enable a faithful reconstruction of the way the Emperor's chambers may have looked during the first stage of the palace. The surface area of the cellars is about an eighth of the entire palace. The cellars also contained a nymphaeum and a marble table (mensa) from the Emperor's dining room.

In the Early Middle Ages, as refugees made their homes behind the safety of the palace walls, a part of the underground complex was used as a residential area. Remains of this adaptation specific housing conditions during the Middle Ages are seen in the yard (15A). In one of the halls, wine and oil were produced as the remains of an ancient oil and wine press (turnjačica) were found (remaining exhibited in the same spot to this day). Later the cellars were turned into a water storage facility. The old monastery and church of St. Klare, was located above the eastern section of the cellars. It is suggested that the eastern section of the cellars partially collapsed during this time, and resulting in the destruction of the monastery. In time, the cellars were almost forgotten, being filled in with waste material from the upper floors. However awareness of them (in Split at least) seems to have lasted, the old Split name for the substructures is "Grote" and seems the locals came to view them as a place to fear and respect, as popular belief had it they had been the dungeons where the Emperor Diocletian tortured Christians during his Persecutions. However, some more affluent Splinchians who had houses above them sometimes broke through their vaults and redesigned them into their own storerooms and basement spaces.

In the 19th century, work began, to excavate, drain and clear the collapsed sections of the Cellars, by architect and conservationist Vicko Andrić, the first Split and Croatian conservationist. The work continued through 1950s when the basement's western halls were open to the public in 1959, while those of the eastern part, with the completion of extensive restoration and conservation, works only completed and opened to the public in 1996. Today the cellars are accessible through the Bronze Gate, or through a staircase from the Peristyle. The Western part of the basement has been preserved in its entirety and is almost completely accessible for sightseeing, used as an attractive fair and exhibition space. The Eastern part has collapsed, most likely during Middle Age, however, it has since been excavated and a large part is also accessible.

== Description ==
The cellars entrance starts/terminates at the Cardo maximus within the palace, approaching from the peristyle and the Porta Aenea. The massive barrel-vaulted cellars are shaped in the construction of the Palace in a downward-facing position to level the southern, residential part of the Palace with other parts of the Palace. Their spaces have a variety of forms: basilic, central, central – cross, rectangular, etc. The walls served them as the basis of Imperial dwelling buildings above them, and their forms of space probably coincided with the shape of those buildings that disappeared by molding houses and streets of Split in the Middle Ages.

== Gallery ==
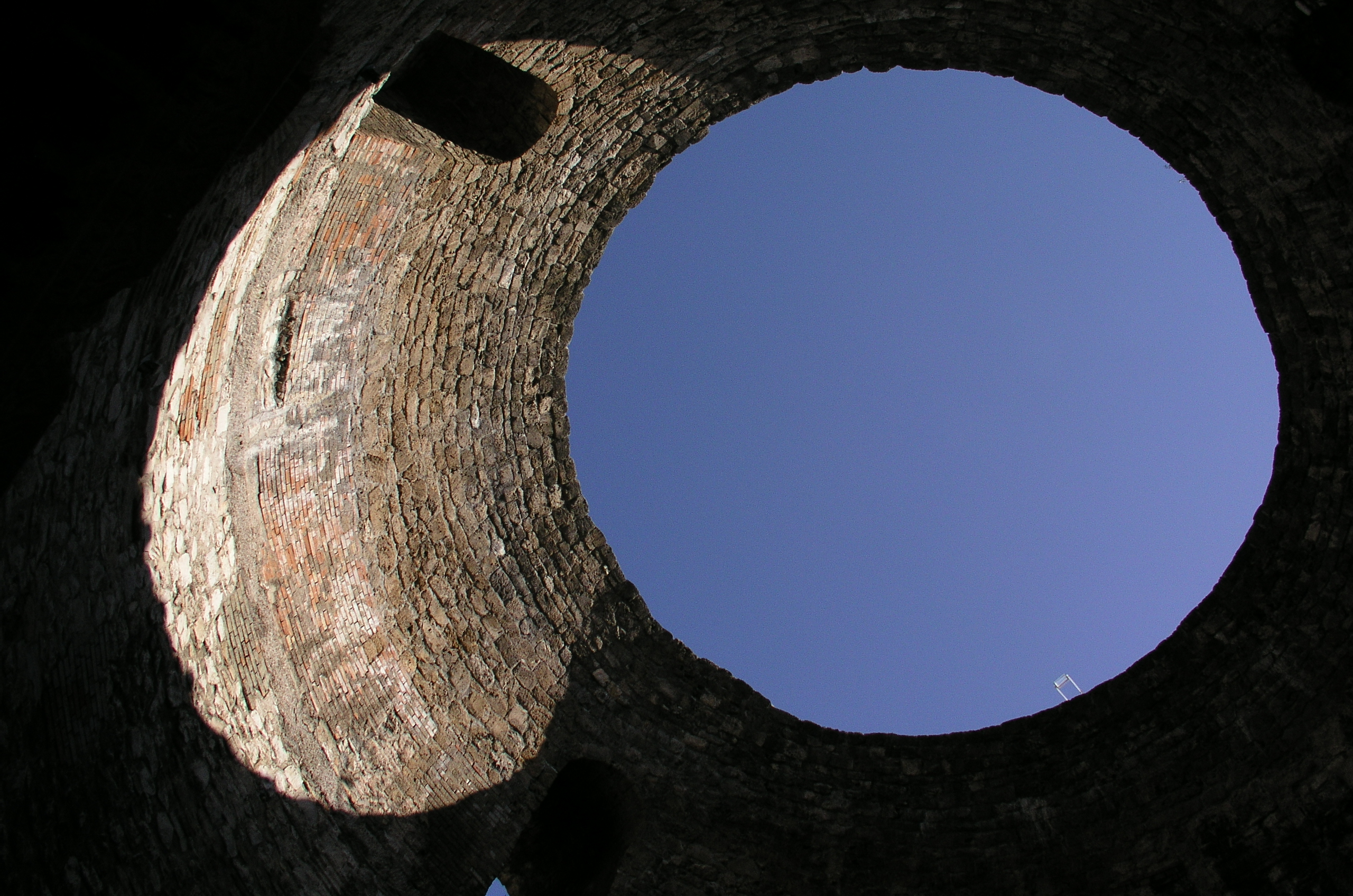
The Vestibule leading to the cellars of the Palace.

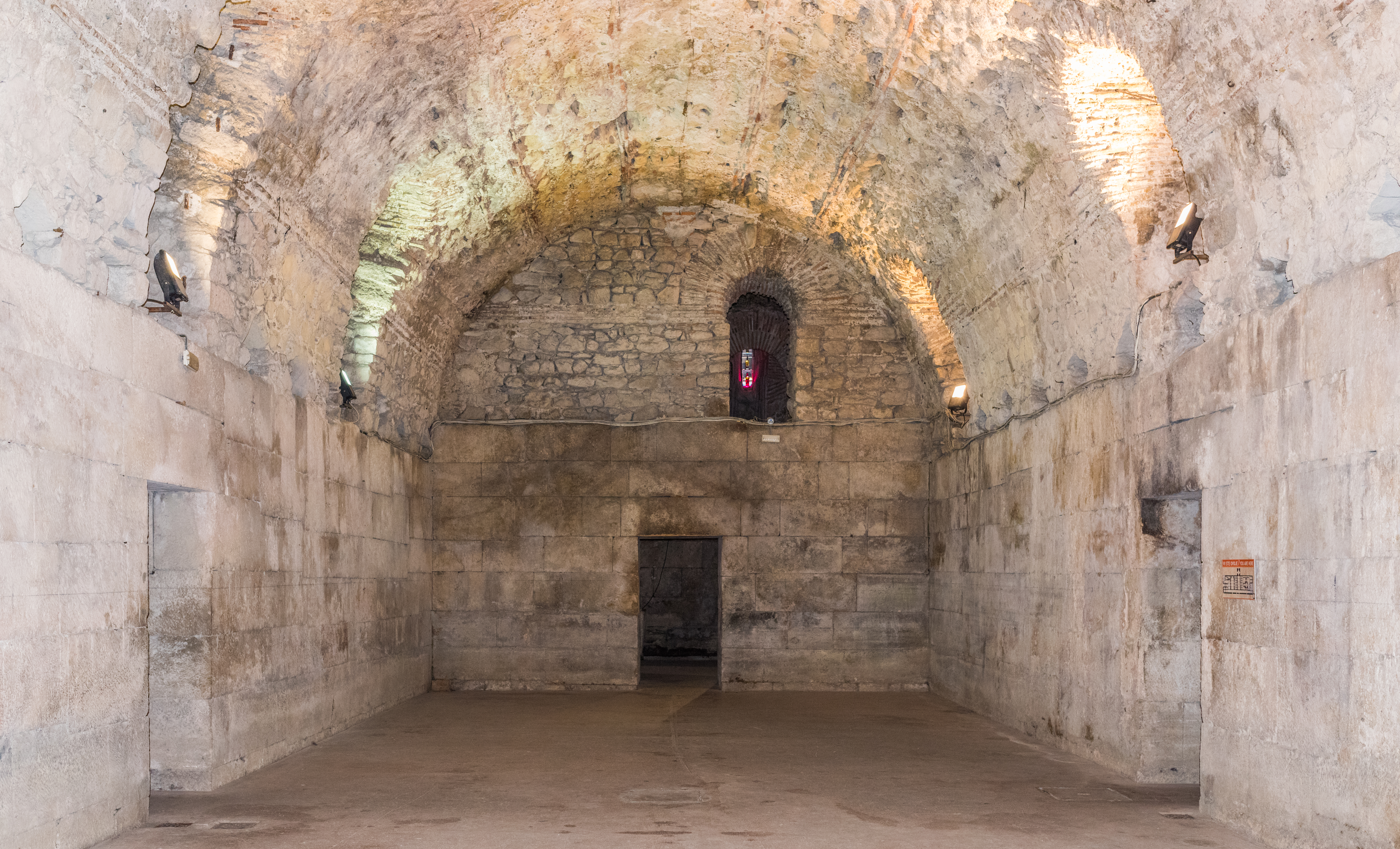
Cellars of Diocletian's Palace.

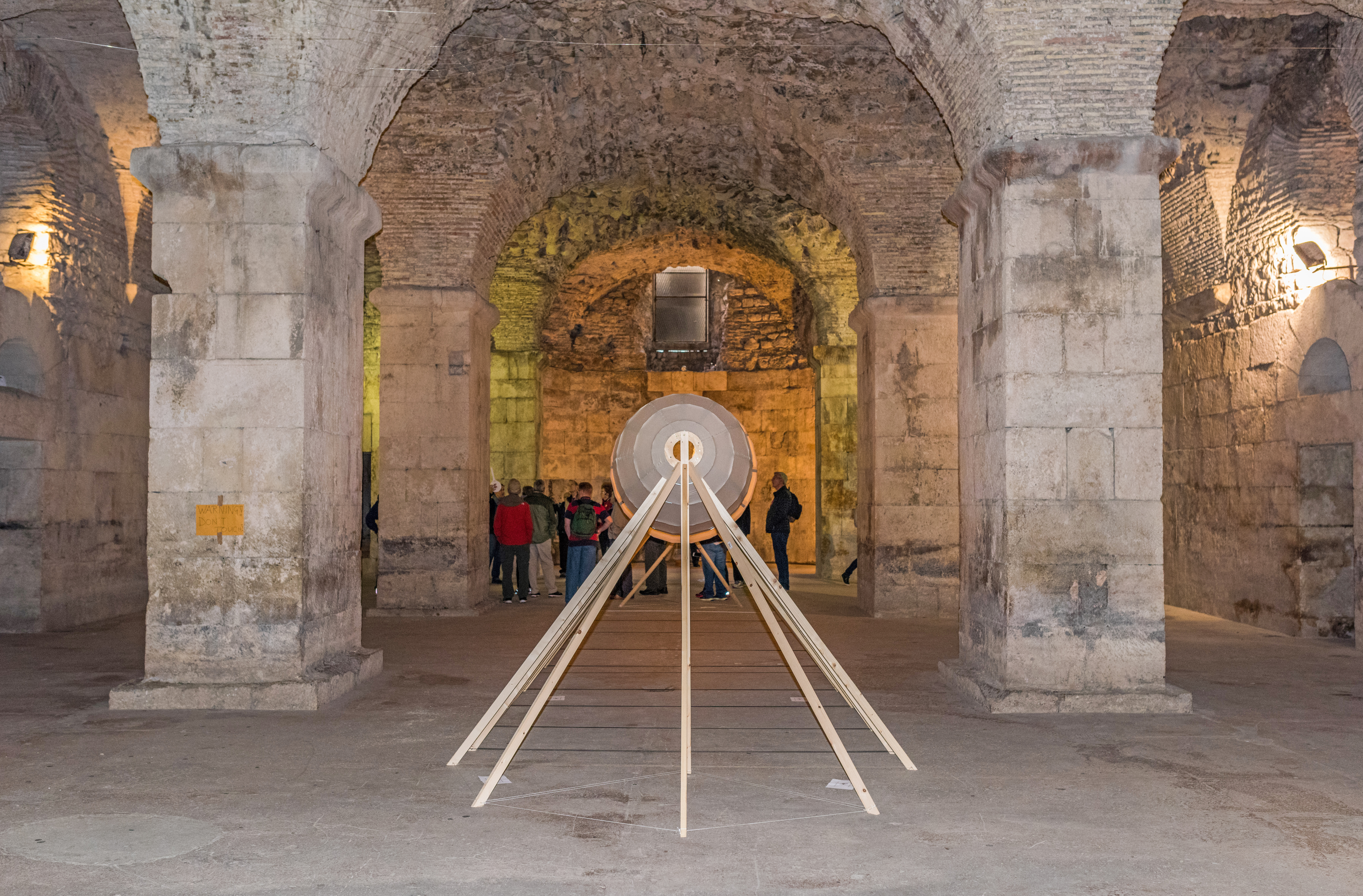
Cellars of Diocletian's Palace.

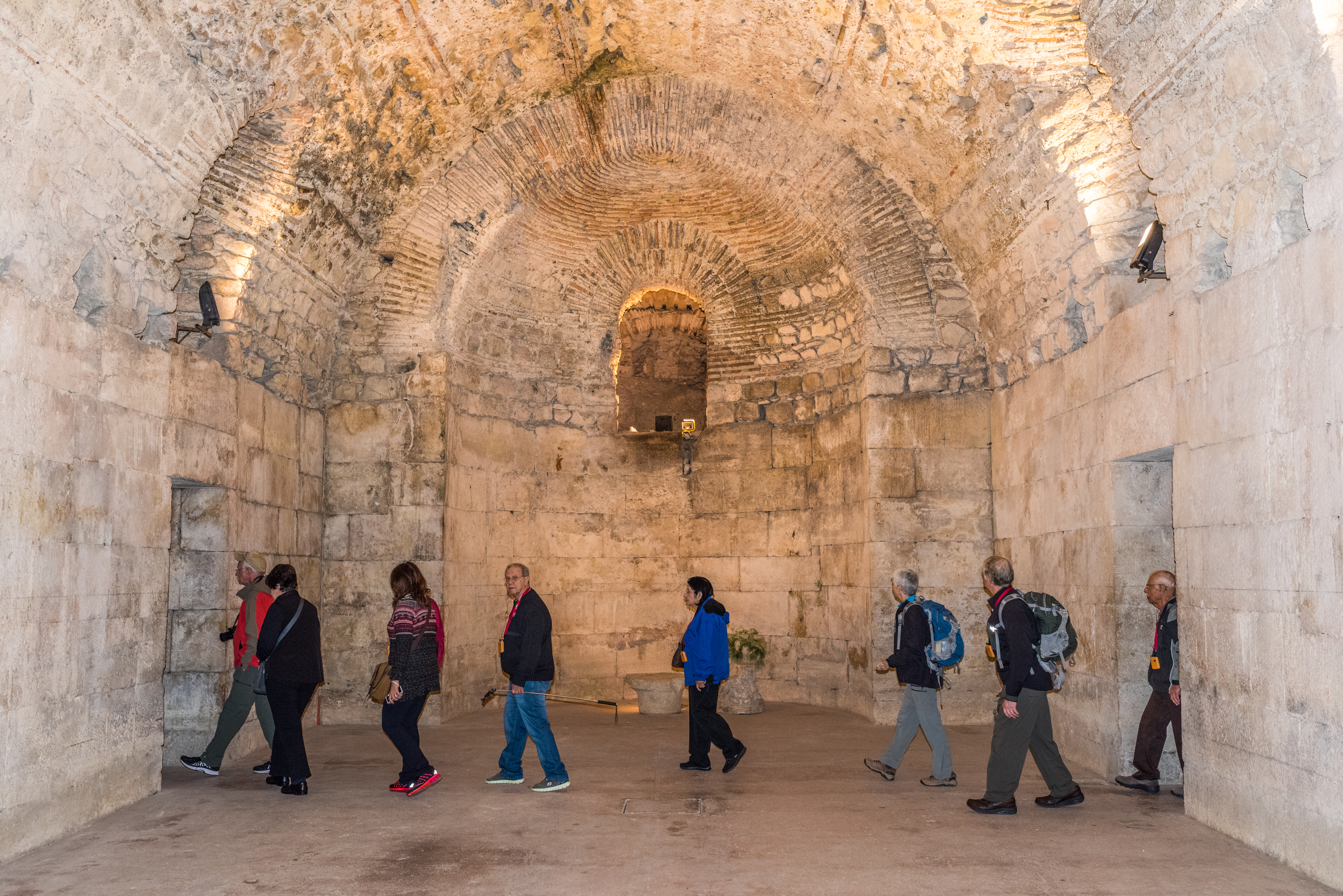
Cellars of Diocletian's Palace.

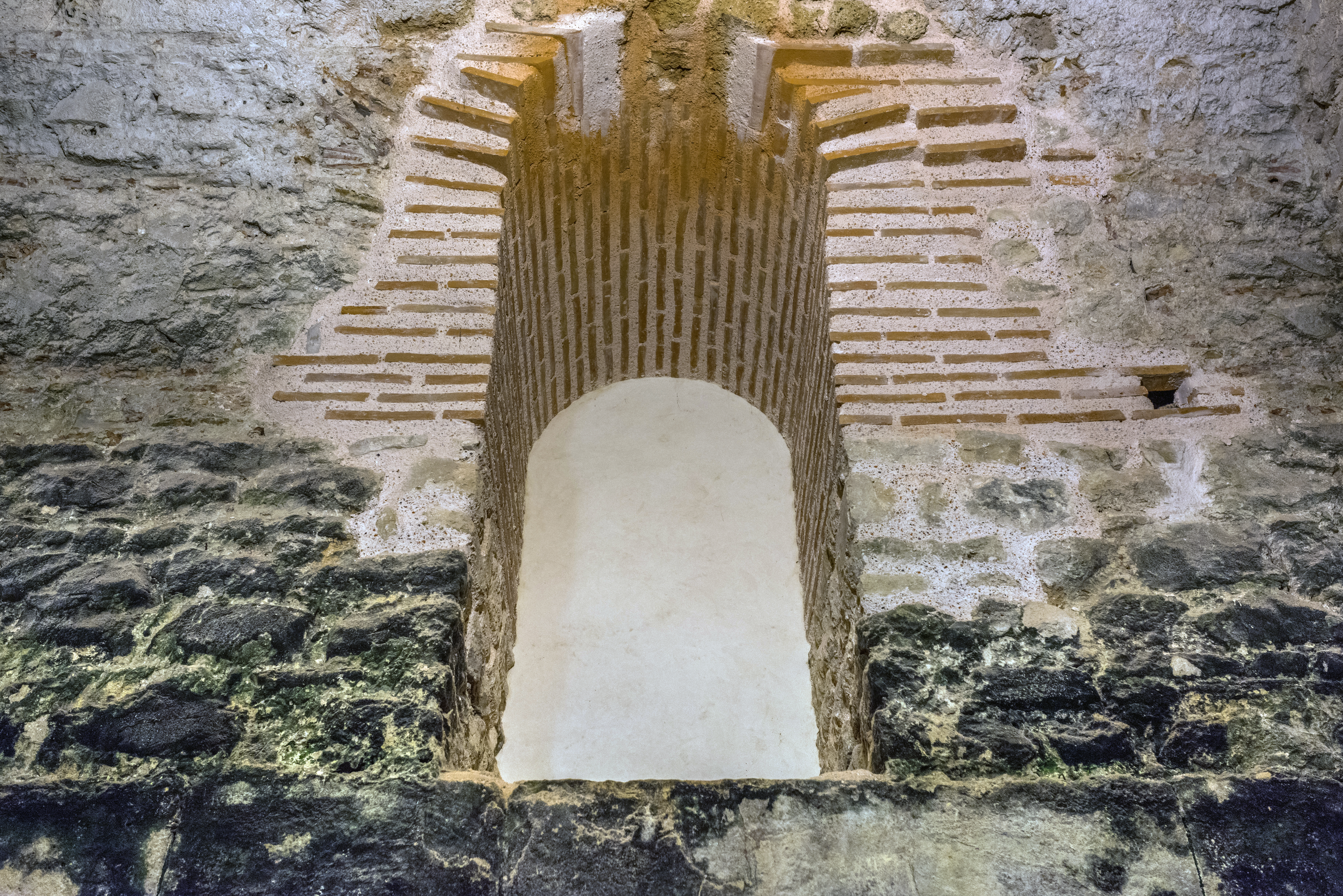
Cellars of Diocletian's Palace.

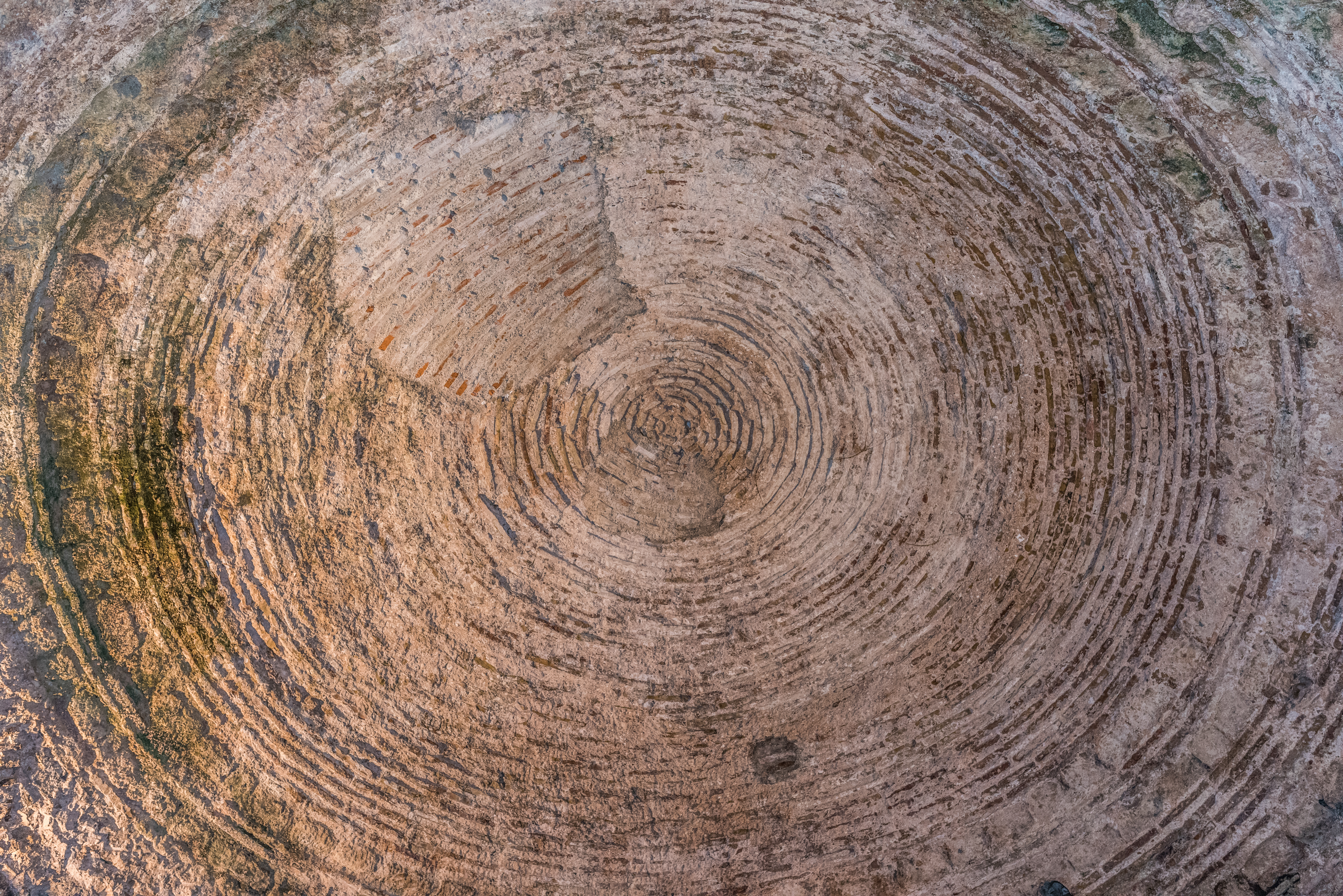
Cellars of Diocletian's Palace.

== See also ==
- Diocletian's Palace
- Vestibule, Split
- The Bronze Gate (Diocletian's Palace)
- The Iron Gate (Diocletian's Palace)
- The Silver Gate (Diocletian's Palace)
- The Golden Gate (Diocletian's Palace)
- Roman architecture
- Dalmatia
