= St. Martin's Church (Split) =

Coordinates: 43°30′33″N 16°26′26″E

The Church of Saint Martin
- Crkva svetog Martina
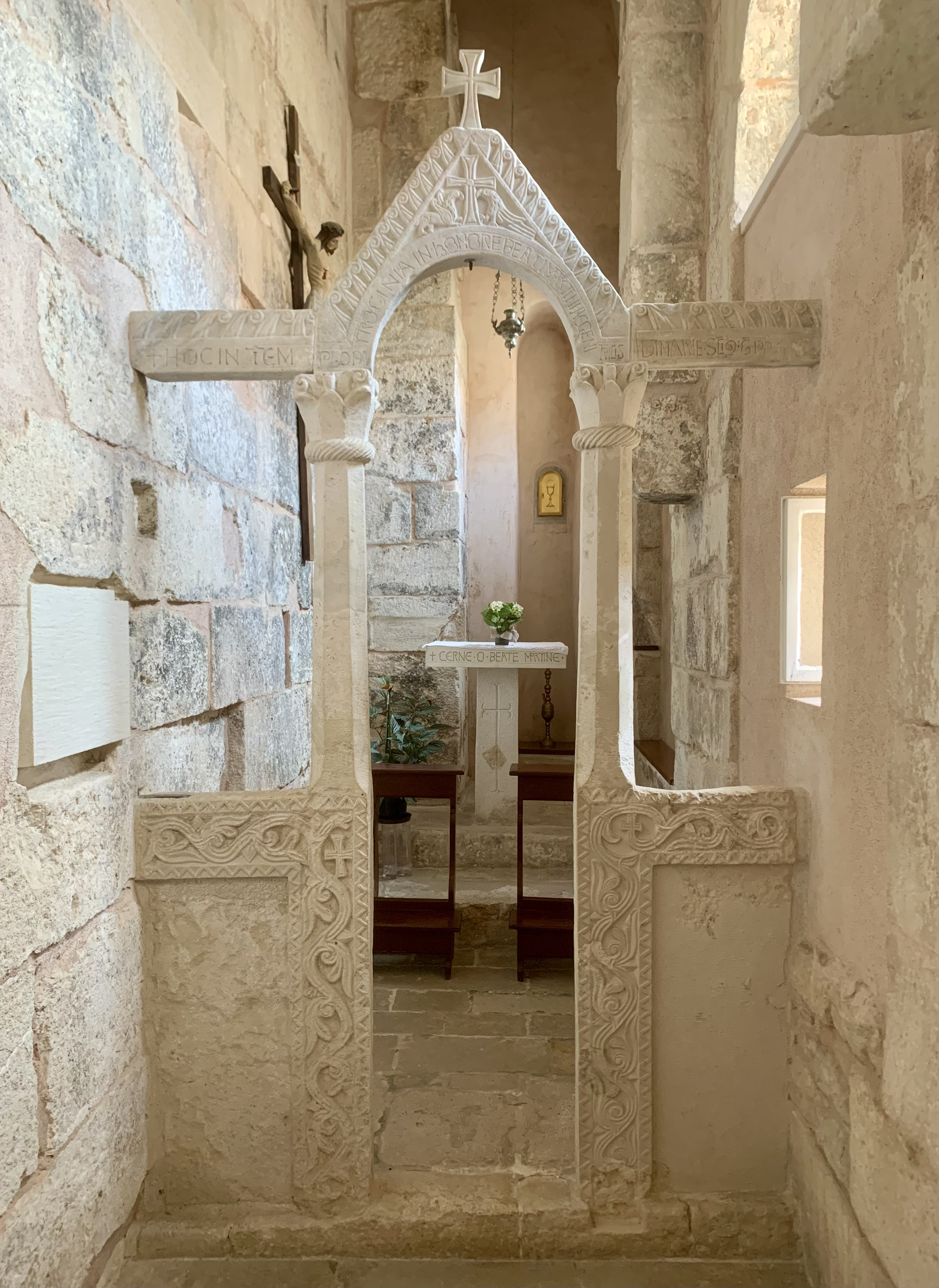
- Interior image of The Church of Saint Martin with a view of the chancel screen (June 2013)
- The Church of Saint Martin
- Location: Split
- Country: Croatia
- Denomination: Roman Catholic
- Previous denomination: Chalcedonian Christianity
- Tradition: Roman Rite

History
- Status: Open
- Dedication: St Martin

Architecture
- Functional status: Active
- Heritage designation: National Monument
- Architectural type: Church
- Style: Roman Romanesque, Gothic
- Groundbreaking: 6th century (within a 4th-century structure) renovated (9th century)

Specifications
- Materials: stone

Administration
- Parish: Split

Clergy
- Bishop: Dražen Kutleša

St. Martin's Church (Croatian: Crkva sv. Martina) is a Roman Catholic church in Split, Croatia. Built into a small space (an early guardhouse) within the ancient Golden Gate of Diocletian's northern wall, it is one of the oldest churches in the city. St. Martin's Church is one of Split's tourist attractions and is known for its fine 11th century chancel screen. It is currently in the care of the Dominican sisters, who have a monastery next door. The church itself is open to public visits.

== History ==
St. Martin's is located in a cavity of the west wall above the Porta Aurea of Diocletian's Palace. That space, in the time of Diocletian (285-305), was a narrow corridor (1.64 meters wide by 10 meters long) that was used as a guardhouse, with the windows (now filled in) on the south side for surveillance of approach to the main gate into the complex. These windows remain well preserved to the present day in their original form, while windows on the north side date from the city's defence against the Ottoman Turks in the 15th century. The space was converted into a church sometime in the 6th century when the complex saw an influx of refugees from outlying communities. Similar churches exist/existed over the Silver Gate, Iron Gate, and the Bronze Gate.

An inscription along the architrave of the entrance door:

REX BENEDICTE D(EU)S, LAUDIS DECUS IMPERI V(IRTUS)Q(UE.
(H)ANC (ECCLESIAM) CONSTITUIT SUB (H)ONORE(M) BEATI MARTINI
(H)UMIL(I)TE(R) (HA)EC ATQ(UE) POTE(N)S P(RES)B(Y)T(E)R DOMINICUS.
SALVE PA(TER)...T TIBI P(ER) N(OST)RI PECTORIS ANTRA COLI.

Translated by archaeologist Frane Bulić, it reads:

Blessed by God, our King, to you the glory, honour and power! Founding this Church for the glory of the blessed Martin, in modesty and according to your means, the priest Dominic. "Hail Father Martin, allow us to worship you from the bottom of our soul and heart in this small cavern".

In identifying Dominic, Bulić dated the inscription to the ninth century and the region of Trpimir I. It seems the (knez) chaplain Dominic renovated the former guardhouse into the first Christian church in the city dedicated to the Virgin Mary, Saint Gregory I and St. Martin of Tours (the father of western monasticism).

On 4 March 852 Trpimir issued a charter in Biaći (in loco Byaci dicitur) in the Latin language, confirming Mislav's donations to the Archbishopric in Split. The charter is preserved in a copy from 1568. In this document, Trpimir named himself "by the mercy of God, Duke of the Croats" (Latin: Dux Chroatorum iuvatus munere divino) and his realm as the "Realm of the Croats" (Regnum Chroatorum). The term regnum was used by other rulers of that time as a sign of their independence and did not necessarily mean a kingdom. The charter documents Trpimir's decision to build a church (possibly St Martin's) and the first Benedictine monastery in Rižinice, thus bringing the Benedictins into Croatia.

On the architrave, together with his own name, Trpimir also had the name of his other chaplain (also called Martin). The Main altar too dates from the 9th century. The church later provided certain amenities such as a settlement for Dominican sisters (which dates as far back as the 14th century). Bulić, following his discoveries of 1890 and study of the palace, recommended its renovation. On that occasion, the new altar and nave were built. In 1929, during the enlargement of one of the windows, a tablet was discovered with an engraved inscription: "The unworthy servant, priest Dominic, chaplain of Duke Trpimir". Bulić believed that this might represent the gravestone of Dominic. Today it is kept in the Archaeological Museum.

Above the church, a pre-Romanesque bell tower was erected, which was later demolished in the 19th century (similar to the church bell tower of Our Lady of Zvonik above the Iron Gate, which has been preserved to date).

== Architecture ==
The northern gate of the Palace had been conceived as the main entrance, and so it had been elaborately decorated with statues of Emperor Diocletian and his co-regent Maximian in the upper row of the niches, and with a sculpture of an eagle (a symbol of Jupiter), between the two. There were the statues of their two successors to the throne – Caesars Galerius and Constantine – in the lower row of the niches. This conclusion can be made on account of the imperial iconography pattern, effective at the time of tetrarchy (rule by four persons). On the top of the wall, there have been four pedestals preserved until the present day (while there were five of them on the drawings from the 18th century) that could have been used as a supporting base for statues, but it is unlikely to believe that the imperial figures would have been repeated twice on the same façade. So far, there has not been a credible explanation given for this double usage. This could be concluded by the presence of patron saints (later added) to whom the other gates of the Imperial Palace had been dedicated: St. Theodore (The Western Gate), St Apollinaris (The Eastern Gate) and St. Julian (The Southern Gate). St. Martin (patron saint of soldiers), like St. Theodore, was venerated in the later Roman period, particularly in the West, during the rule of the Emperor Justinian (527-565).

The altar screen divides the church into two parts. The screen is made of marble and covered in vines, grape vines and griffon. On the altar wall, the only one preserved in situ in Dalmatia, there is an inscription with the dedication to the patronage of the Virgin Mary, St. Gregory the Pope and Blessed Martin.

The Byzantine stage, probably built in the 9th century, belongs to the barrel vault, with an altar in the apse with a carved cross of early Christian denominations and a small trance set in the middle of large, buried antique openings on the southern wall. The later Byzantine stage of the 11th century belongs to the altarpiece and the bell tower, which was later destroyed.
