= Golden Gate (Diocletian's Palace) =

- Zlatna vrata (Croatian)
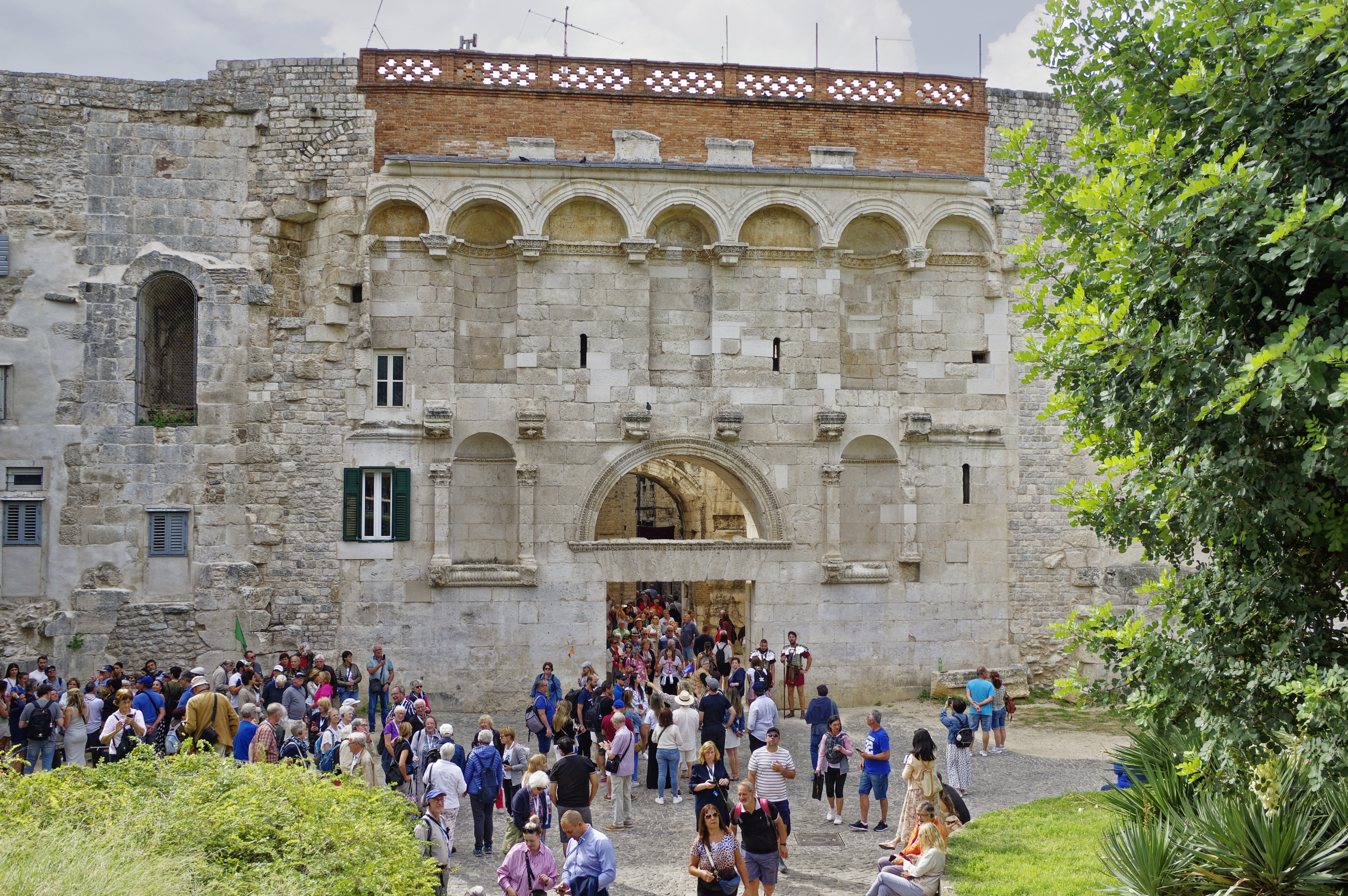
- The Golden Gate (Porta Aurea)

- Location within Croatia
- 43°30′33″N 16°26′26″E
- Type: Gatehouse
- Location: Split, Croatia

History
- Built: 4th century AD
- Built by: Diocletian

Site notes
- Architectural style: Roman

The Golden Gate (Croatian: Zlatna vrata, Latin: Porta Aurea), or "the Northern Gate", is one of the four principal Roman gates into the stari grad (old town) of Split. Built as the main gate of Diocletian's Palace, it was elaborately decorated to mark its status. Over the course of the Middle Ages, the gate was sealed off and lost its columns and statuary. It was reopened and repaired in modern times and now serves as a tourist attraction.

== History ==
The gate stood at a terminal point of the road which led north towards Salona, Diocletian's birthplace and the capital of the Roman province of Dalmatia. It was probably used by Diocletian to enter the palace after his abdication from the imperial throne on 1 May 305. The Romans of late antiquity called the structure Porta Septemtrionalis ("Northern Gate"). In the Middle Ages, its name was changed to Porta Romae ("Roman Gate"); the name "Golden Gate" seems to date from the Renaissance, making its first appearance in the 1553 itinerary of the Venetian trade unions Died and Giustiniana.

Amid the upheavals of the Migration Period in the 6th century, small churches were built over the Golden, Silver, Iron, and Bronze gates. Dedicated to St. Martin, the church of the Golden Gate occupies a narrow corridor (1.64 x 10 meters), which had been used as a guard passageway in the time of Diocletian. St. Martin's Church was later augmented by a pre-Romanesque bell tower. Demolished in the 19th century, this was similar in style to the still-surviving bell tower of the Church of Our Lady of Zvonik above the Iron Gate.

The sieges of the early Middle Ages prompted the town's inhabitants to close off the gate, using a smaller and more defensible passageway in its place. In more settled times, a new gate, the Door of Picture, permanently superseded the Golden Gate as the main entrance to the city on the north side.

In or around 1630, the Venetian governor Alvise Zorzi ordered the disassembly of eleven Roman towers on the north and east sides of the palace wall, sending the stone blocks to Venice to be used in the construction of Santa Maria della Salute. Among the casualties of this project were the two octagonal towers flanking the Golden Gate. The gate was only re-opened in 1857, in an undertaking which necessitated the demolition of houses which had been built up against the north wall of the palace. Much accumulated earth was cleared away, but around 2 meters of the gate and wall remain below ground level. The most recent reconstruction was carried out by the metropolis in the first years of the new millennium, with the gate covered in a building wrap from 2012 until 2015. As of 2020, the structure was open to the public.

== Description ==
The Porta Septemtrionalis was the "main landward gate" of Diocletian's palace, located in the middle of the northern wall. Its exterior opening measures 4.17 by 4.36 meters; above the lintel is a 3.02-meter-high arch composed of 19 stone blocks. The double doors of the gate were set into this opening, which could also be closed by a portcullis. Between the inner and outer openings of the gate is a courtyard (propugnaculum), once overseen by guard passageways built into its upper walls. The inner gate opens onto the Cardo Maximus, at whose opposite end is the Bronze Gate. Centuries of soil accumulation at the base of the wall have reduced the openings in the gate from 6.5 to fewer than 4.5 meters in height.

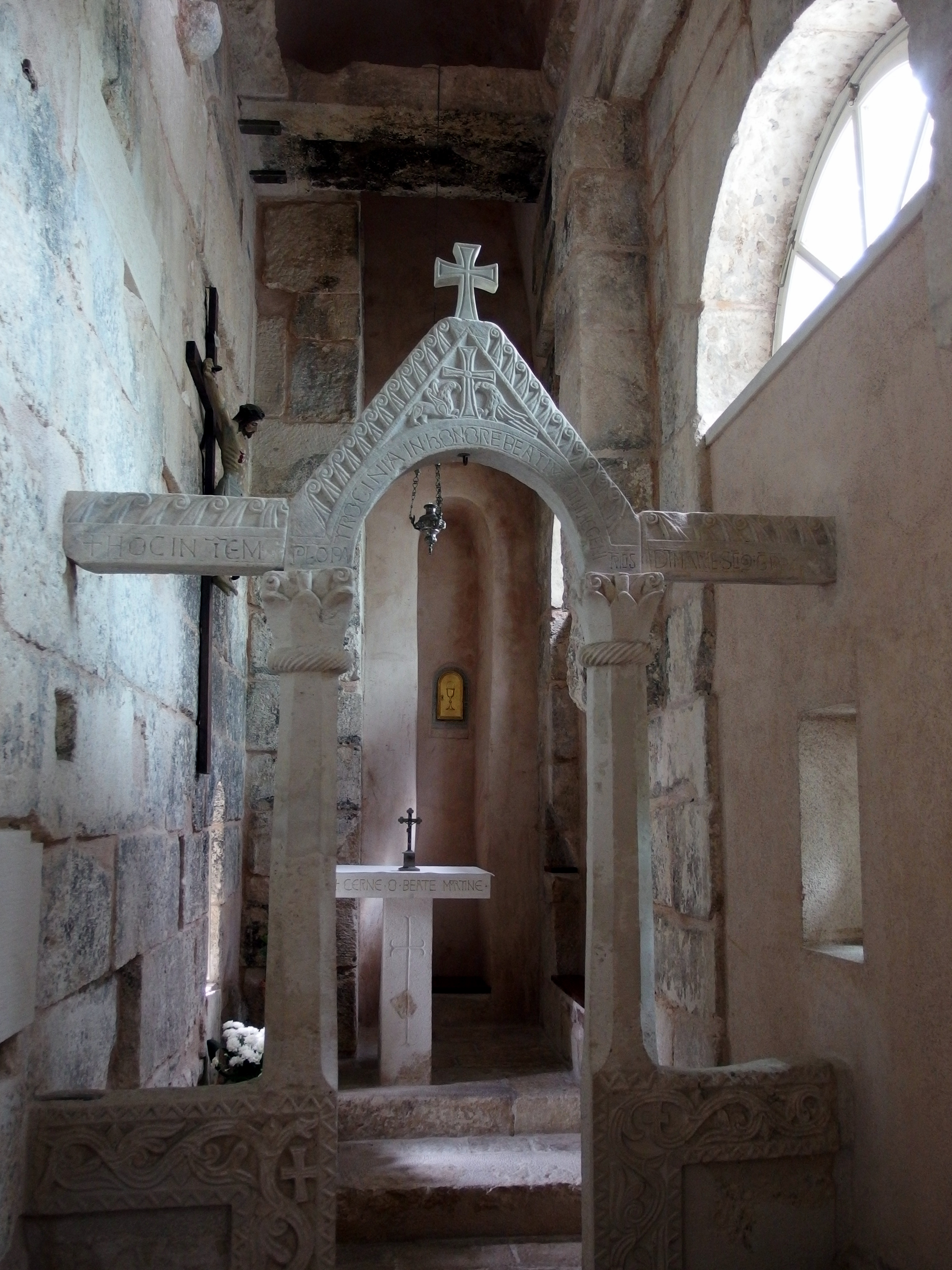
Interior of The Church of Saint Martin with a view of the chancel screen (June 2013)

Set into the facade of the gate are five niches, two on each side of the central arch and one above. Four of these once housed statues of the Tetrarchs: Diocletian, Maximian, Galerius and Constantius Chlorus. Modern restorers note that the fifth, central niche was made too shallow to hold a statue, to leave room for the portcullis to retract into the upper part of the gate. The same examination found no evidence of statues having stood in the other niches, and the restorers express doubt that the decoration of the gate was ever finished.

The upper three niches are incorporated into a blind arcade of seven arches. Formerly the arches were supported by columns, whose bases stood on corbels projecting from the facade. These columns have since disappeared, although five of their capitals remain, still affixed to the underside of the arcade. The undersides of the corbels are decorated with carved acanthus, with the exception of those immediately over the gateway, which display sculptures of small humanoid faces with horns (one set of which has been broken off) and animals' ears. A modern scholar found these faces "not unlike medieval devils" in appearance. Above the arcade are four plinths; some reconstructions of the gate prefer these, rather than the niches, as the location of the Tetrarchs' portrait statues. John Bryan Ward-Perkins sees the style of the gate as influenced by the architectural practices of the eastern Roman provinces, particularly Syria. He cites such "typically Syrian" features as the "combination of an open arch with a horizontal lintel [and] the bracketing out on consoles of [the] decorative arcade".

The outer gate was defended by two octagonal towers, since lost. The surface of each tower on the ground floor was about 60m^{2}, the inner diameter 8.53m, and the side 3.41 m. There were no corresponding structures on the inner face of the gate. The towers and their connecting walkways could be entered only through passages built into the palace wall and had no doorways on the ground floor.

== Gallery ==
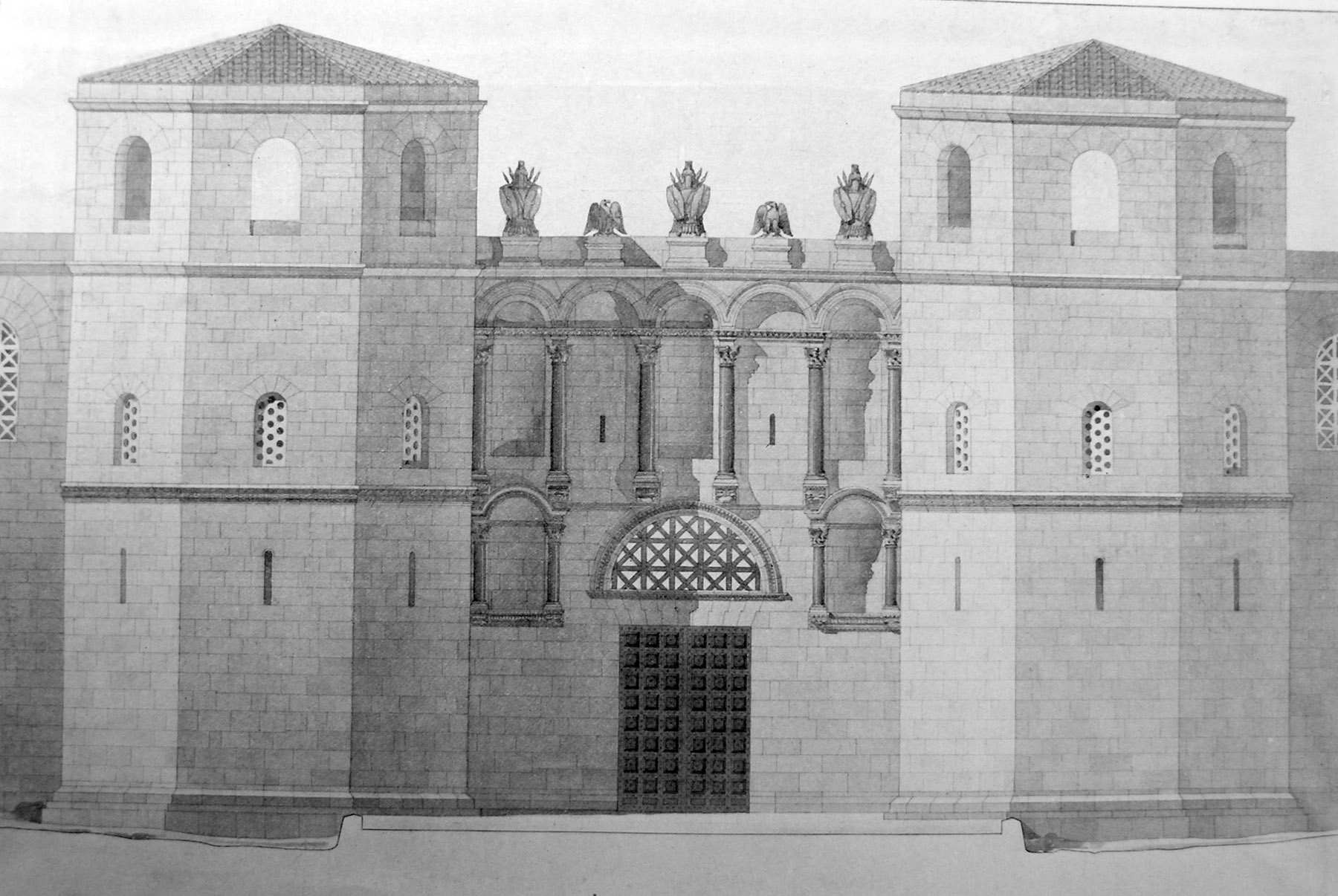
Reconstruction of the 5th century Porta Aurea

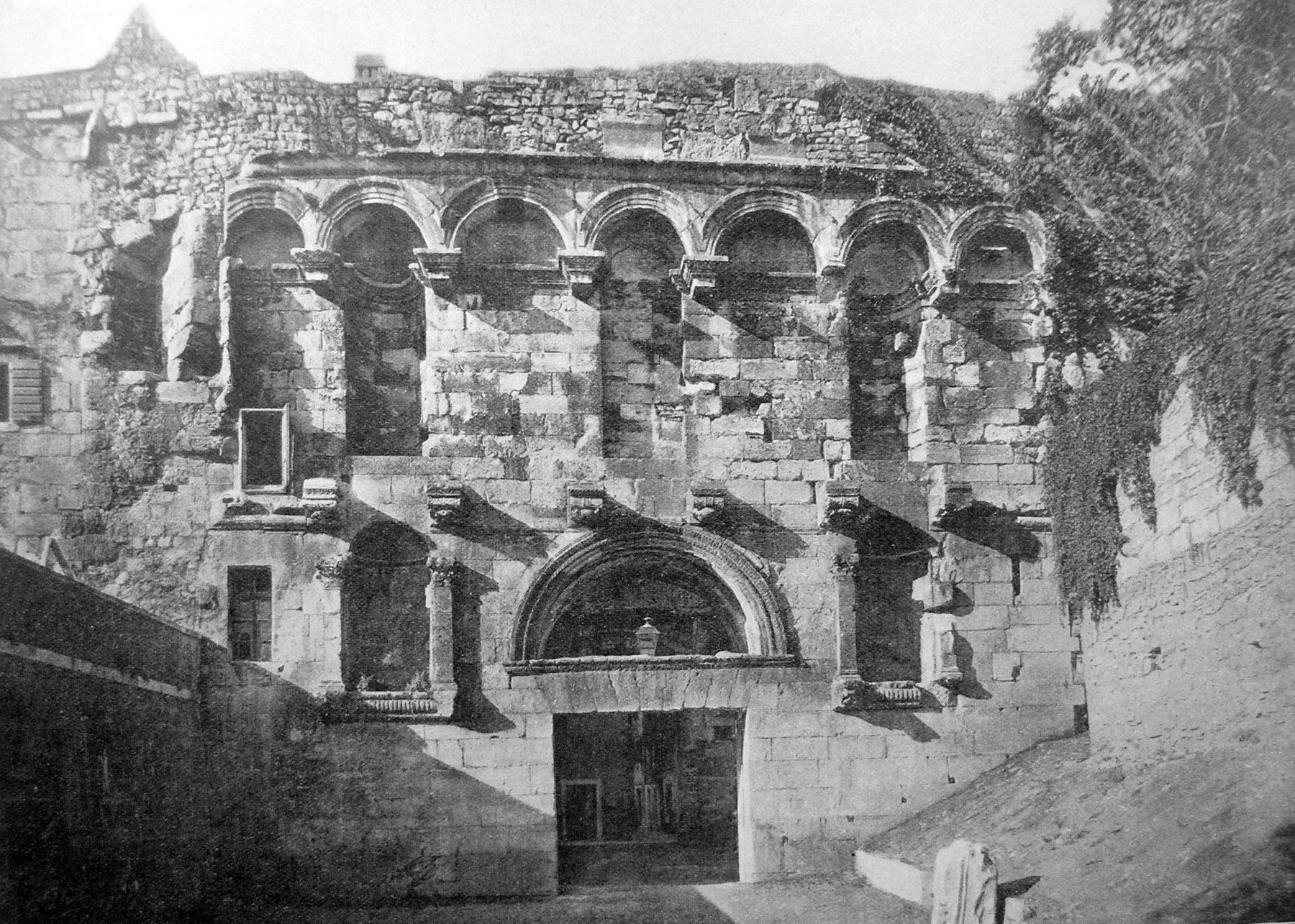
View of The Golden Gate ca. 1910, Photo by E. Hébrard and J. Zeiller, Spalato, le Palais de Dioclétien, Paris, 1912.

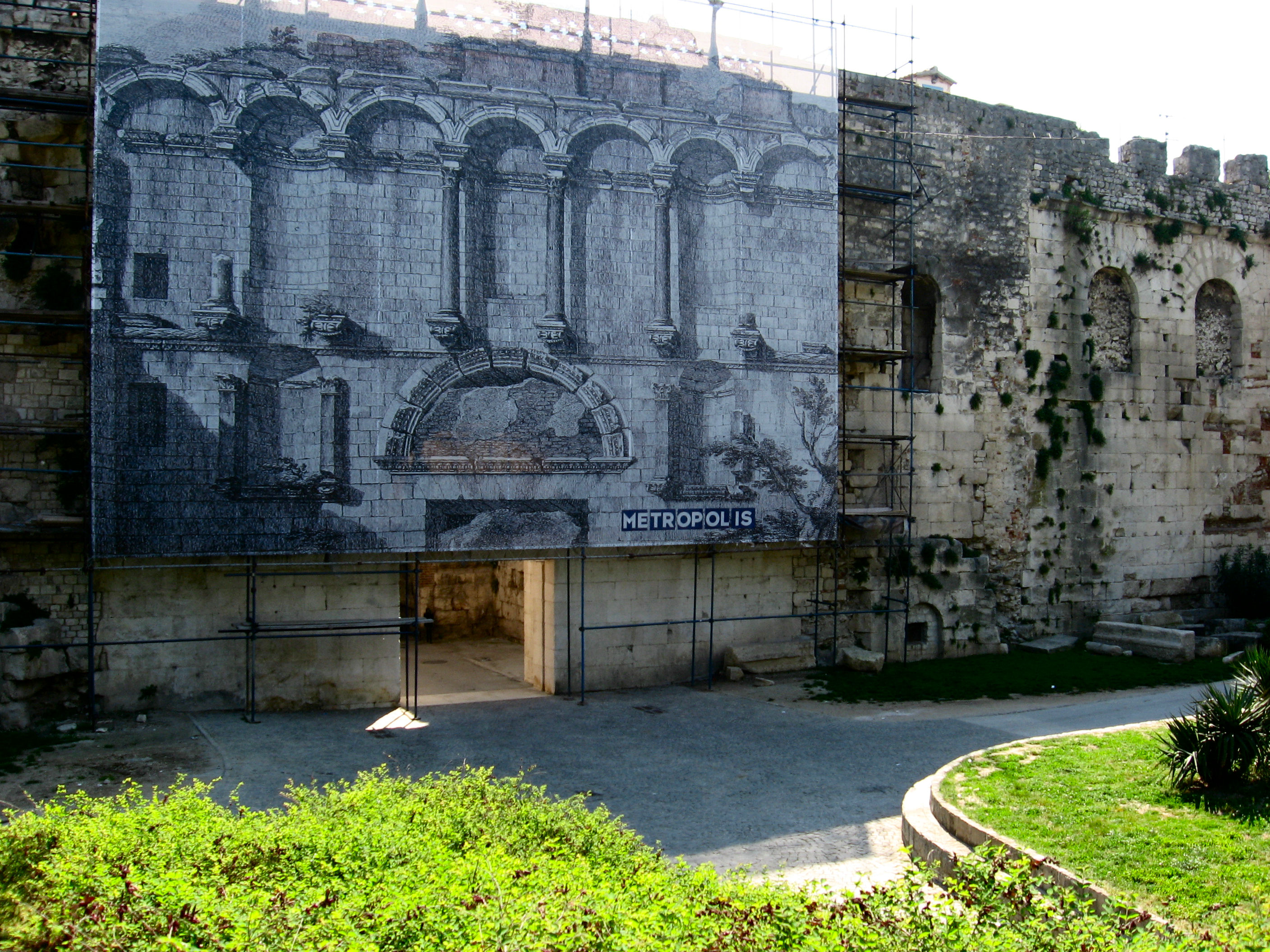
The Porta Aurea, during cleaning and restoration 2007

== See also ==
- Diocletian's Palace
- Vestibule (Split)
- The Bronze Gate (Diocletian's Palace)
- The Iron Gate (Diocletian's Palace)
- The Silver Gate (Diocletian's Palace)
- The Golden Gate (Constantinople), Imperial entrance gate of the city of Constantinople, present-day Istanbul, Turkey
- Red Peristyle (an act of urban intervention done on the main square of the palace)
- Roman architecture
- Marjan, Croatia
- Salona
- Dalmatia
