= Vestibule, Split =

Section of a historic site in Croatia

The Vestibule
- The Rotonda
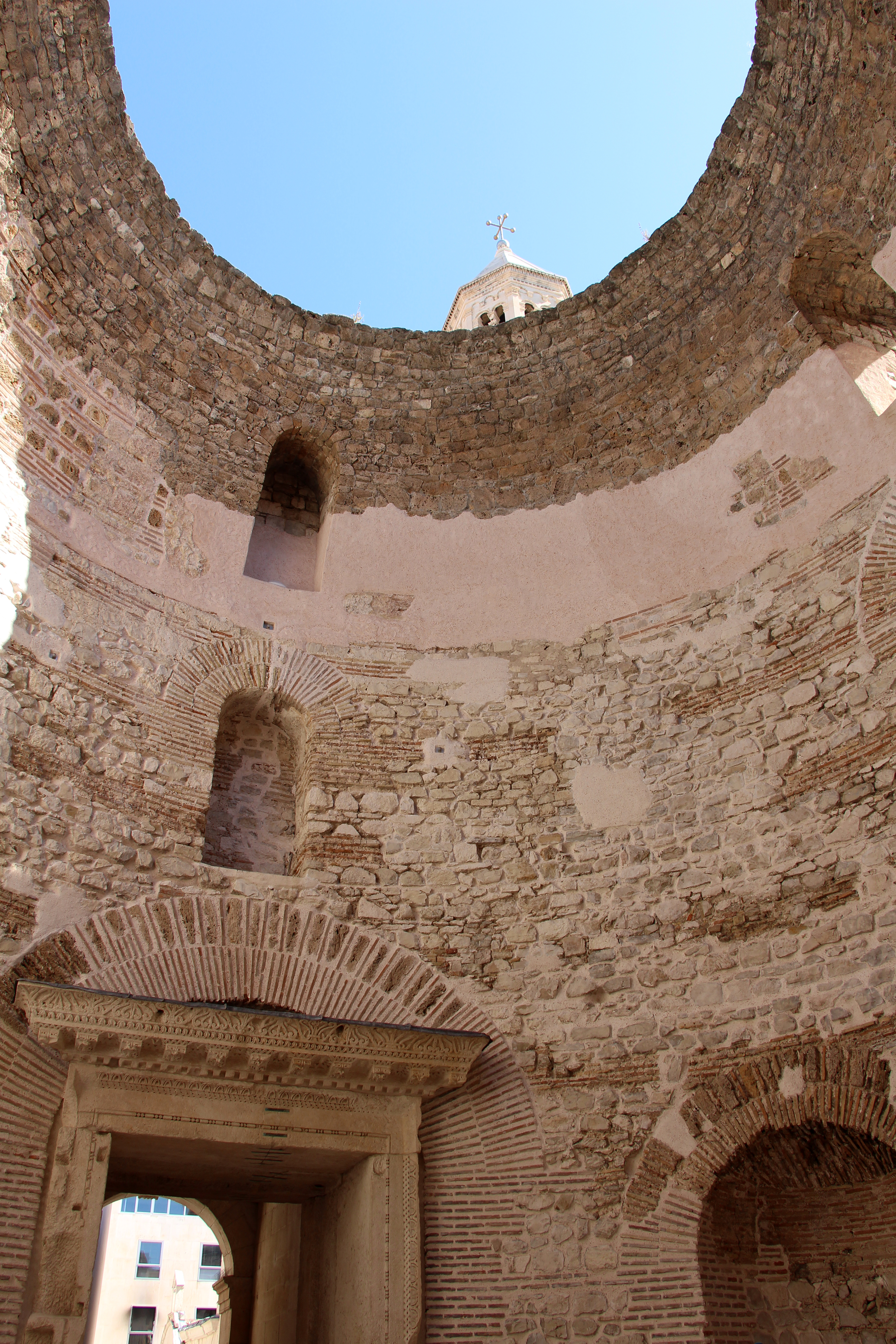
- The Vestibule in Diocletian's Palace.
- Type: Dome
- Location: Split, Croatia

History
- Built: 4th century AD
- Built by: Diocletian

Site notes
- Architectural style: Roman

The Vestibule, also known as The Rotonda or The Atrium, is the first section of the imperial corridor in Diocletian's Palace that led from the Peristyle, which was once the formal entrance to the imperial apartments.

== History ==
Built up to the beginning of the 4th century, as the original part of the ancient palace. It is a circular hall, once topped with a dome, 17 meters in height and 12 meters in diameter. Built as a grand meeting hall only for and selected audiences such as ambassadors. The entrance was adorned with a large door dimension of 2.56 x 3.96 ms with an abundance of relief decorations. The Vestibula area was cleared of four semicircular niches that were filled with statues of unknown deities. Southeast of the vestibule is the Medieval quarter, where the oldest building is the early Romanesque house from the 10th century. On the opposite, inside the church of St. Andrija (now part of the Ethnographic museum).

== Today ==
The space is used by klapa groups to perform popular folk songs during the summer months, taking advantage of the acoustics for an a cappella performance.

== Gallery ==
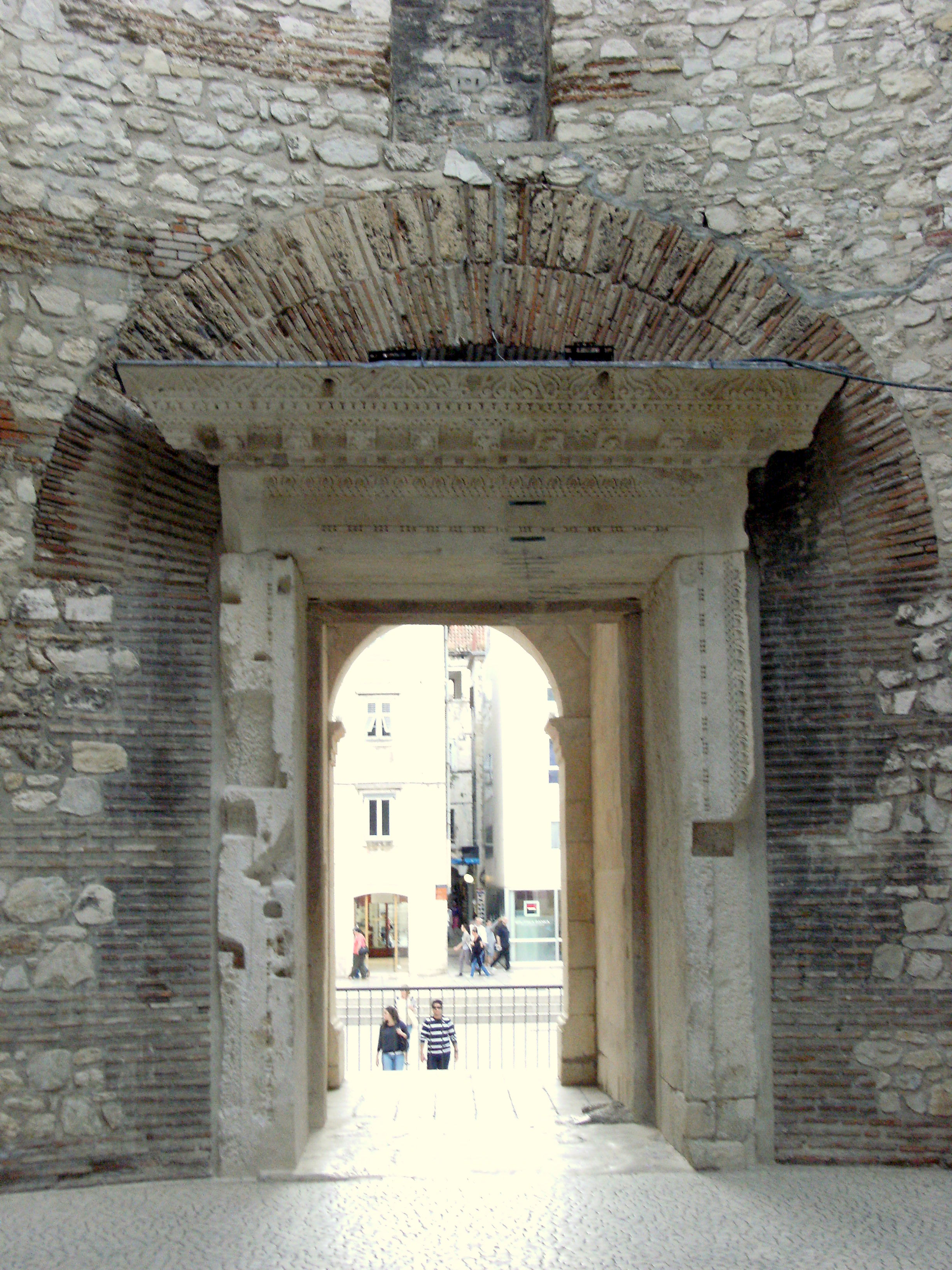
The entrance doorway

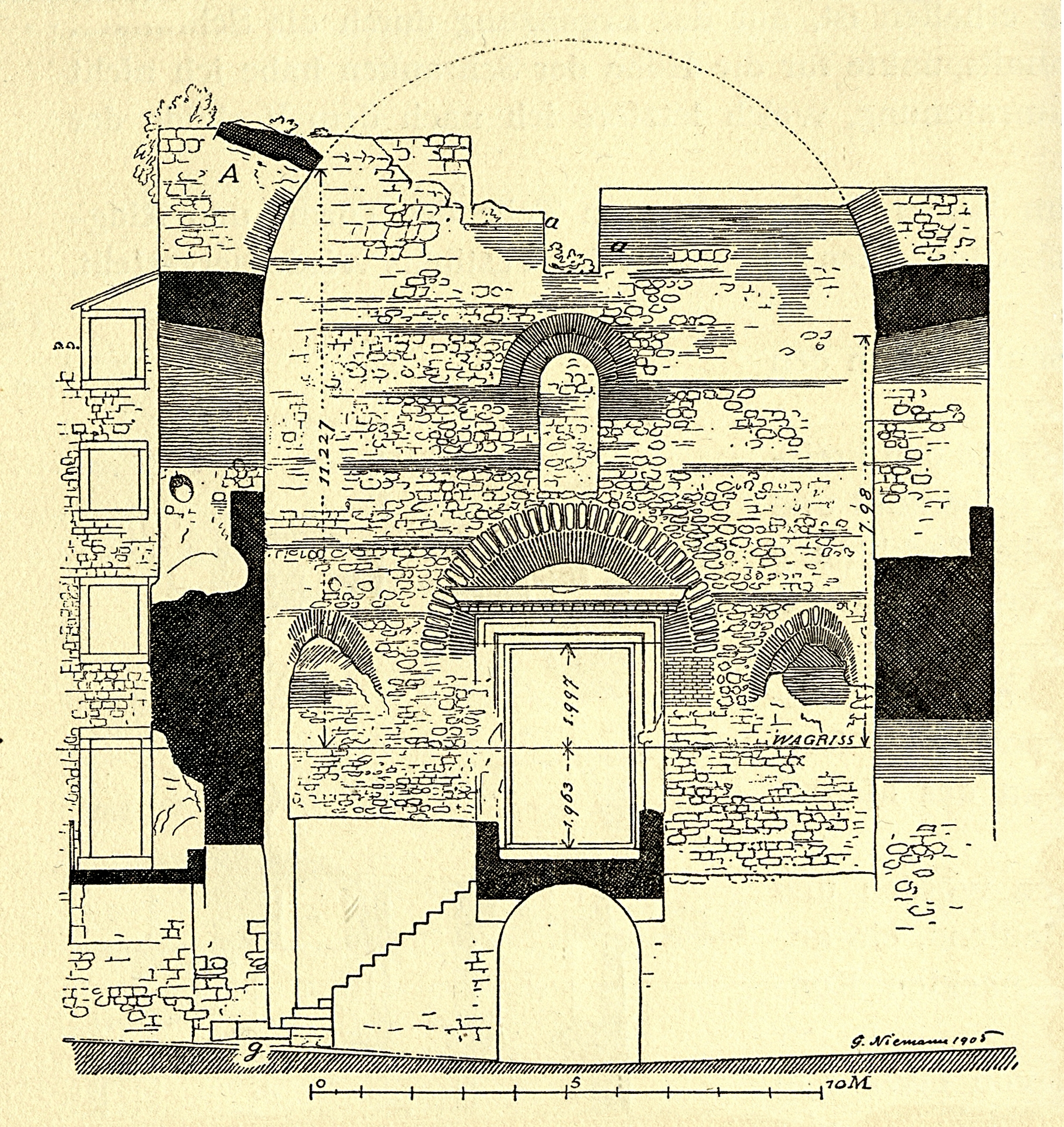
Schematic cross section of the Vestibule

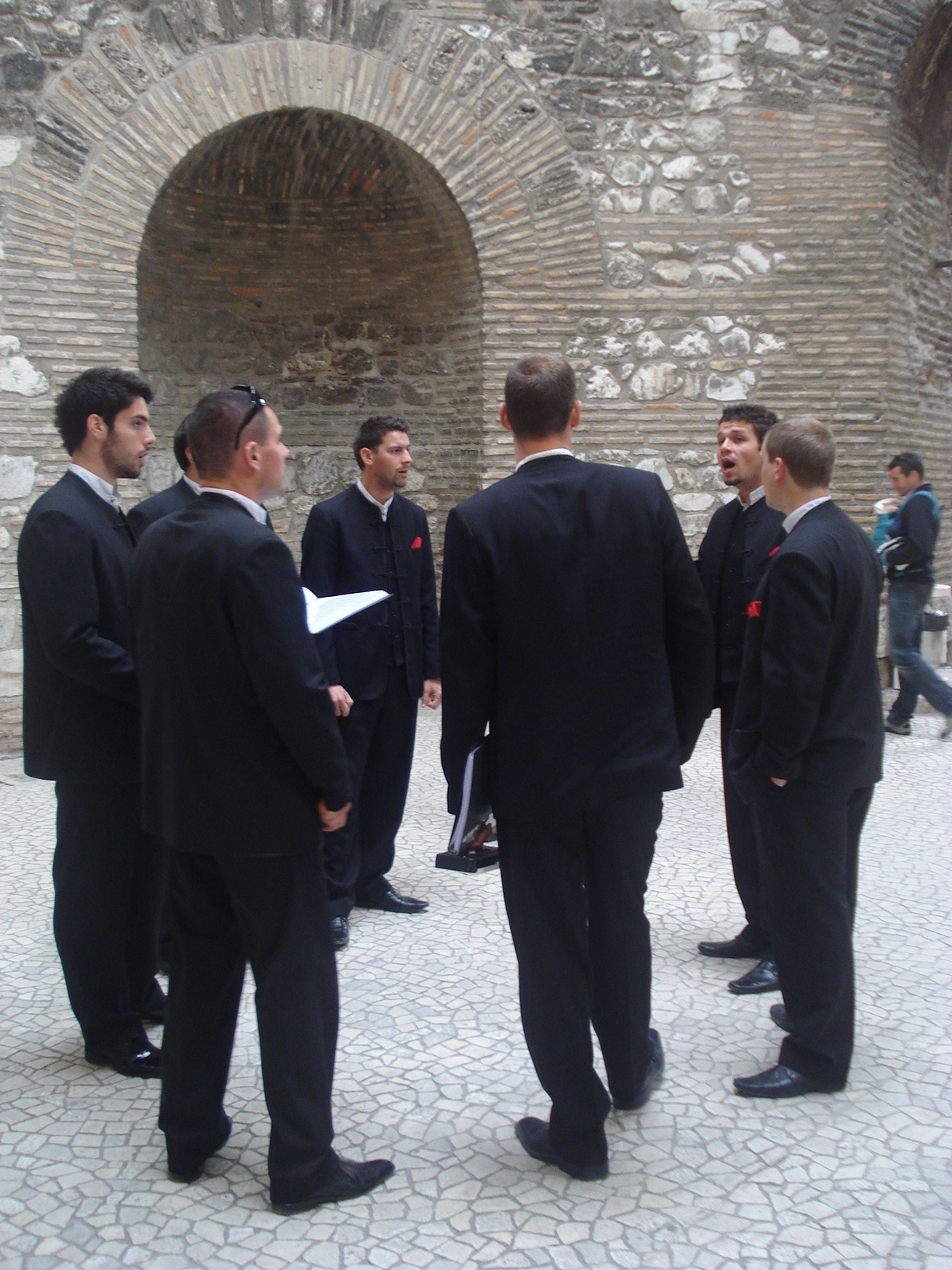
A klapa group performing music inside the Vestibule

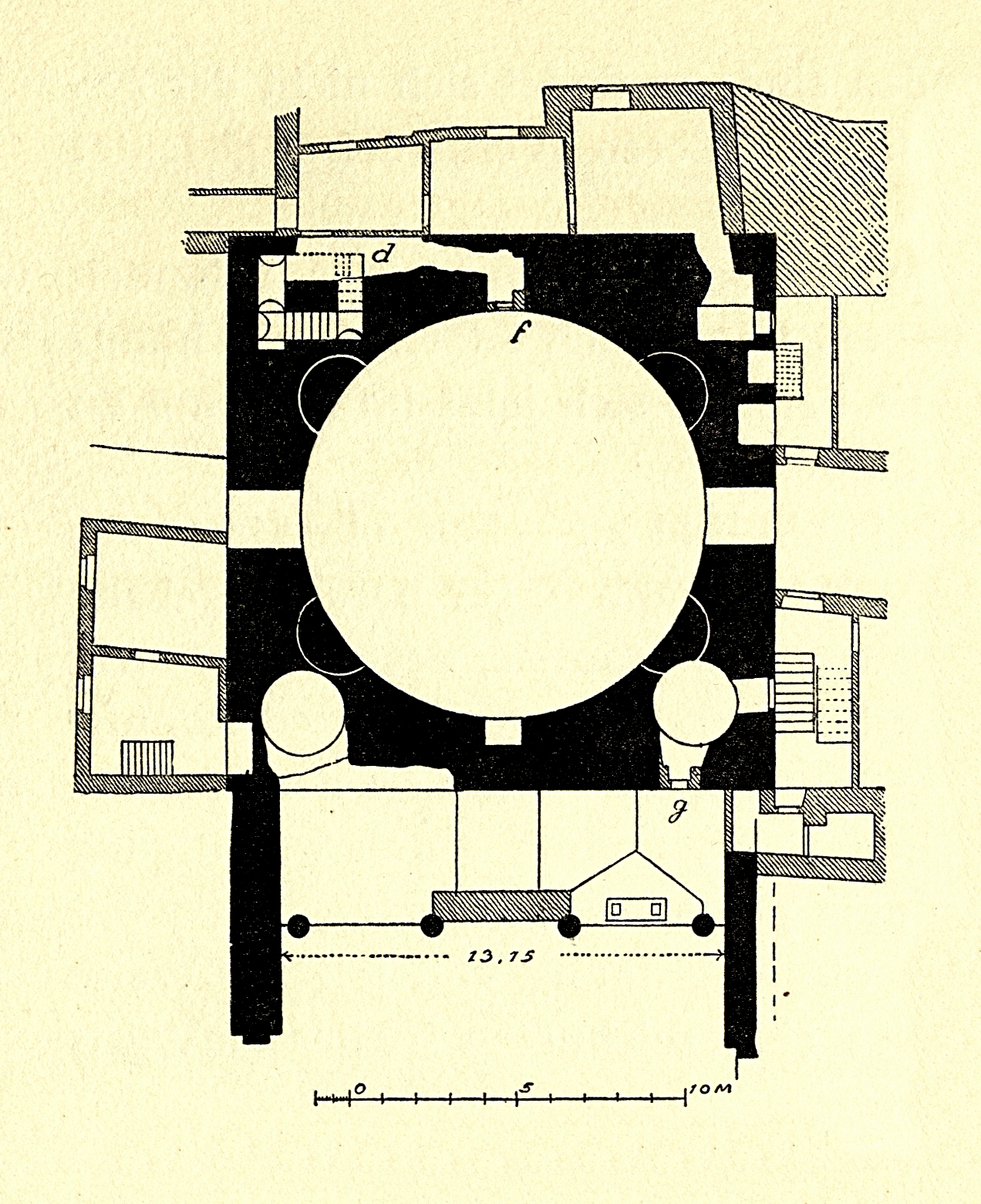
Floorplan of the Vestibule

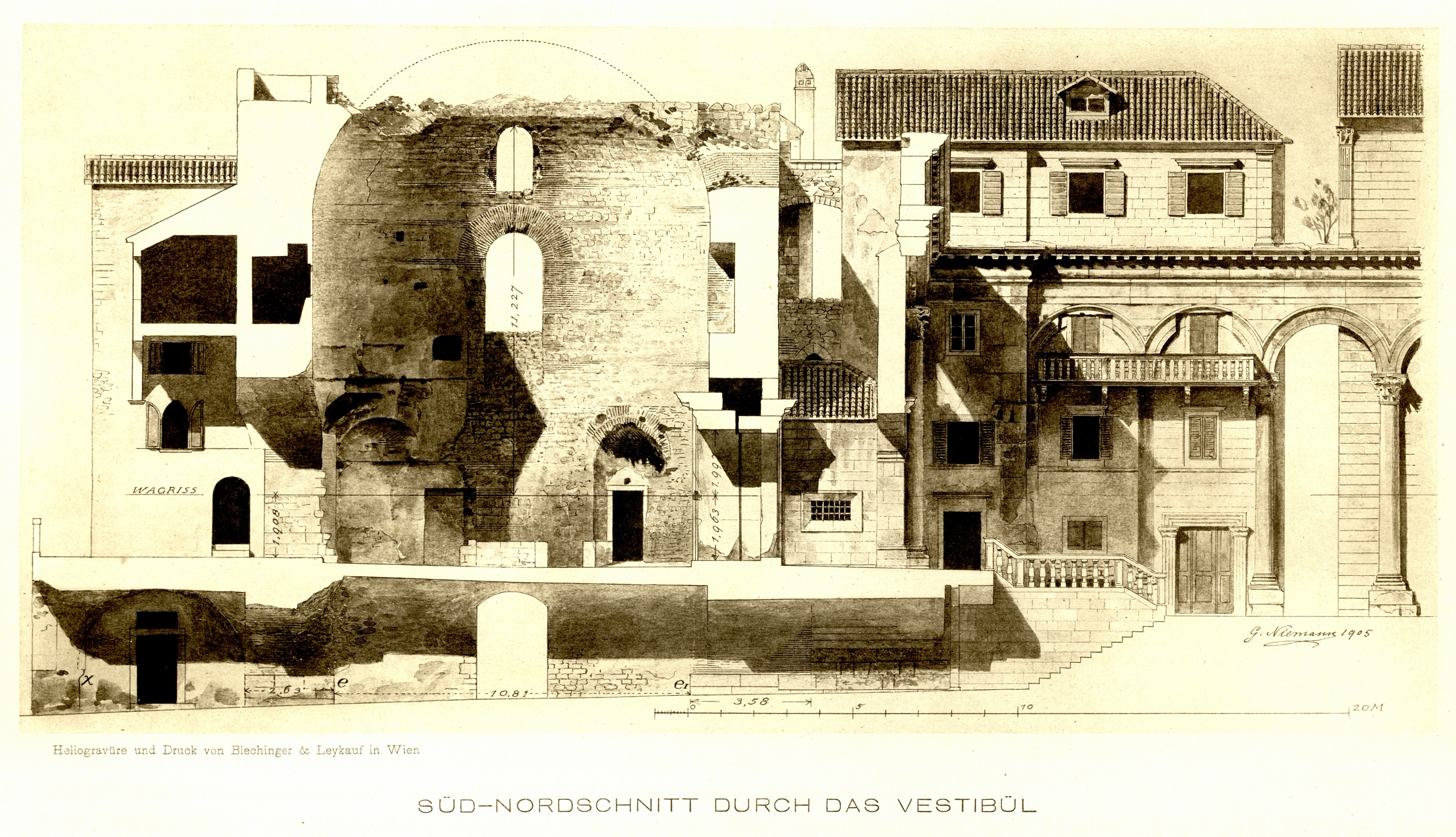
Schematic cross section of the Vestibule with surrounding buildings

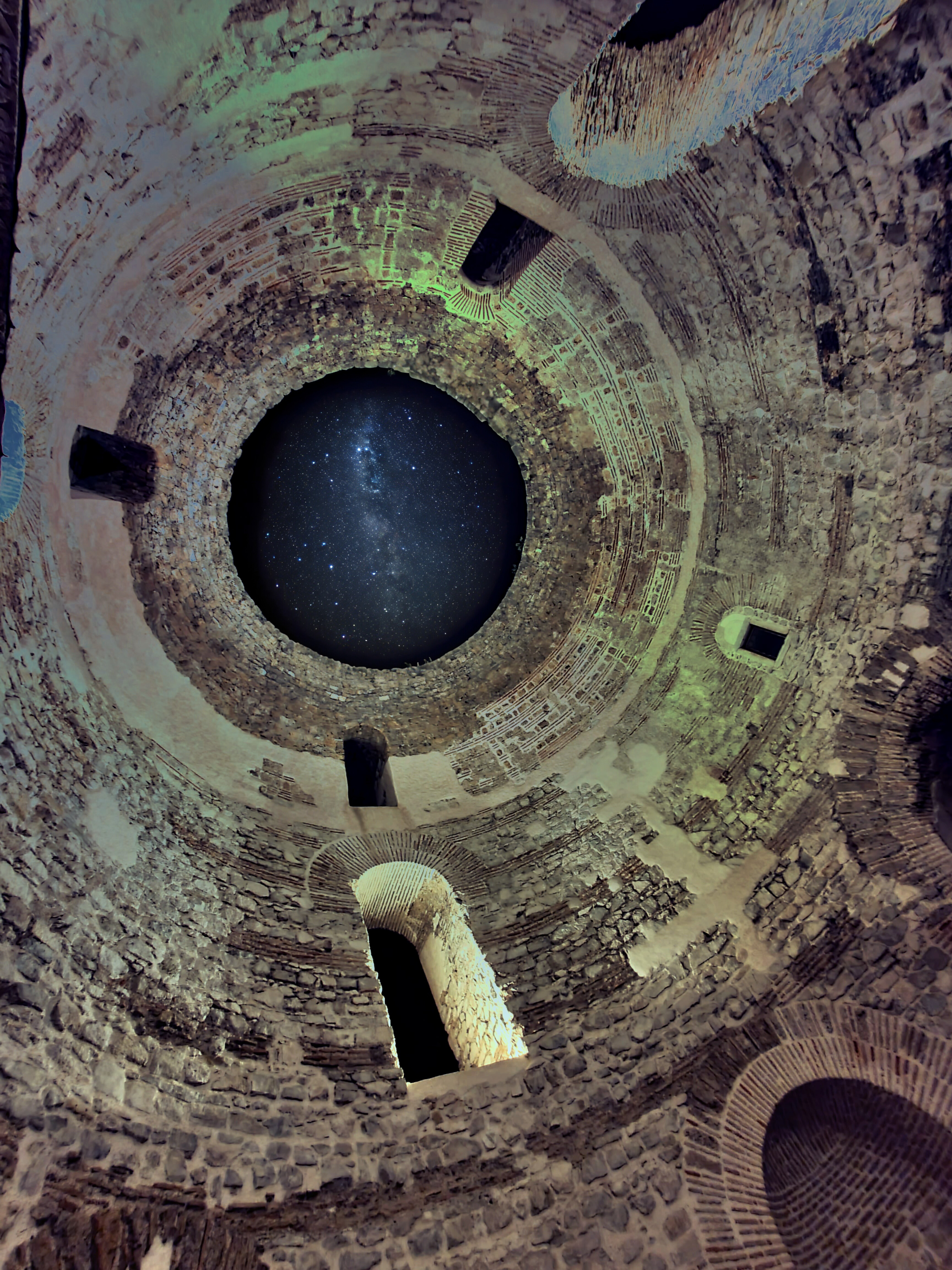
View of Milky Way through Vestibule, during night

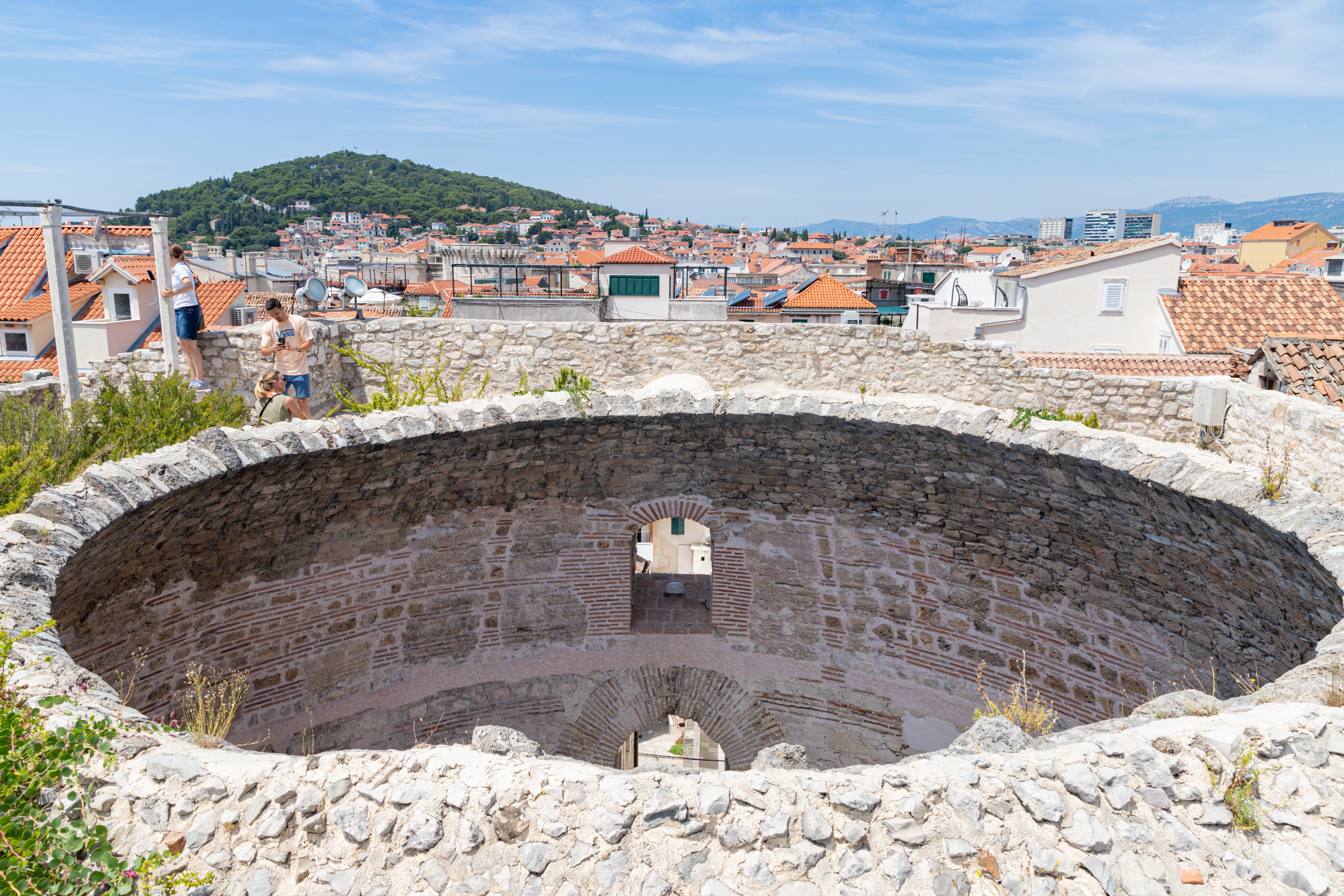
View of Vestibule above Diocletian's Palace

== See also ==
- List of Roman domes
- Cellars of Diocletian's Palace
- Dalmatia
- Diocletian's Palace
- The Bronze Gate (Diocletian's Palace)
- The Iron Gate (Diocletian's Palace)
- The Golden Gate (Diocletian's Palace)
- The Golden Gate (Constantinople), Imperial entrance gate of the city of Constantinople, present-day Istanbul, Turkey
- Marjan, Croatia
- Red Peristyle (an act of urban intervention done on the main square of the palace)
- Roman architecture
- Salona
