= Silver Gate (Diocletian's Palace) =

The Silver Gate
- Srebrna vrata (Croatian)
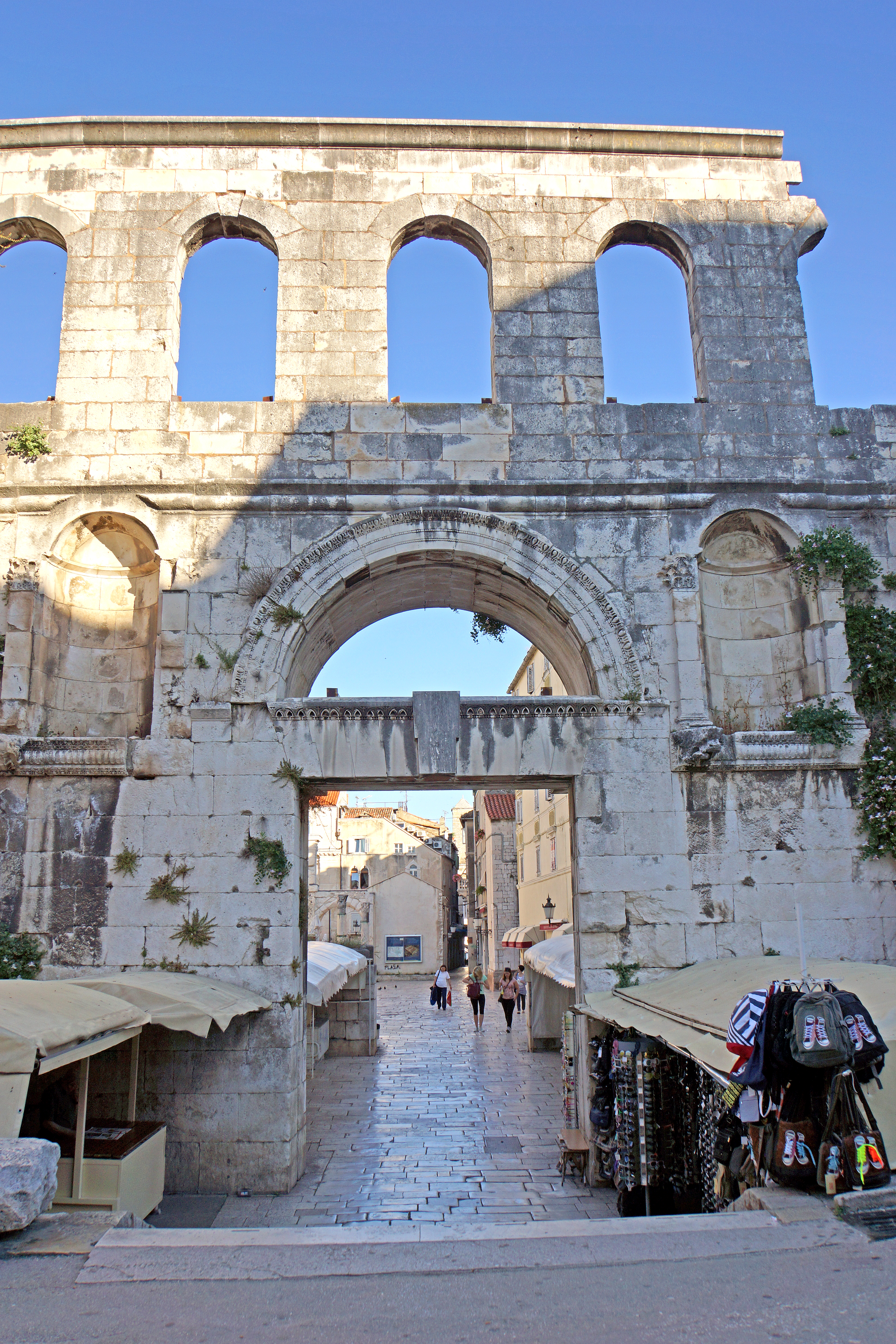
- Silver Gate (Porta argentea) as it appeared in 2013

- Location within Croatia
- Interactive map of The Silver Gate
- 43°30′29″N 16°26′28″E
- Type: Gatehouse
- Location: Split, Croatia

History
- Built: 4th century AD
- Built by: Diocletian

Site notes
- Architectural style: Roman

The Silver Gate (Croatian: Srebrna vrata, Latin: Porta argentea), or "the Eastern Gate", is one of the four principal Roman gates into the stari grad (old town) of Split that was once Diocletian's Palace. The gate faces east towards the Roman town of Epetia, today Stobreč.

== History ==
During late antiquity, the gate was known as the Porta Orientalis ("the Eastern Gate"). Probably in or around the 6th century, a small church dedicated to St. Apolinar was built above the gate, in the sentry corridor. This coincided with the complex seeing an influx of refugees from outlying communities. Similar churches were built over the Golden Gate, the Iron Gate, and the Bronze Gate. The structure of this part of the wall and the door itself were incorporated in various buildings in the following centuries, such as the Church of Dušica, which was destroyed in the Second World War.

The gate was still in operation during the Middle Ages. In 1764 the Venetians, who had ruled over the city for some time, opened what became known as 'the Small Gate', a few meters from the Silver Gate. A building (later the Archaeological Museum) was constructed immediately beside the Small Gate in 1820.

At the end of the 19th century, the church was enlarged, and its present appearance was gained in the early 1930s. The gate was extensively renovated in 1952, after the Allied bombing of Yugoslavia in World War II during which the Baroque church Dušica (Saints-innocents) suffered extensive damage. It was during this time that controversial attempts were made to clean up and restore the building by removing later additions of the fabric of the structure of the eastern wall of the Palace. Gates such as 'the Small Gate' were closed off, which undermined the former aesthetic quality of the surroundings.

Opposite the Silver Gate, next to the main town market is an old monastery and a church of the Dominican monastery of St. Catherine of Alexandria built in the 13th century and restored after the demolition in the 17th century.

The Silver Gate was used by the Pope John Paul II in his popemobile on the way to the Cathedral of Saint Domnius, during his visit to Split in 2000.

== Description ==
The Porta Orientalis was a secondary gate of Diocletian's Palace, as it was not the main gate and was located in the middle of the east wall. Made up of two parts, an outer and inner gates designed as a defensive system the architecture was less ornate and decorative that the Golden Gate located in the north wall of the palace, but still retains 2 niches, which most probably housed sculptures. Like the Golden Gate, the Silver Gate was located between two octagonal towers, and beside them, there were four more towers which oversaw the eastern gateway to the palace.

== See also ==
- Diocletian's Palace
- Vestibule, Split
- The Bronze Gate (Diocletian's Palace)
- The Iron Gate (Diocletian's Palace)
- The Golden Gate (Diocletian's Palace)
- The Golden Gate (Constantinople), Imperial entrance gate of the city of Constantinople, present-day Istanbul, Turkey
- Red Peristyle (an act of urban intervention done on the main square of the palace)
- Roman architecture
- Marjan, Croatia
- Salona
- Dalmatia
