= Iron Gate (Diocletian's Palace) =

The Iron Gate
- Željezna vrata (Croatian)
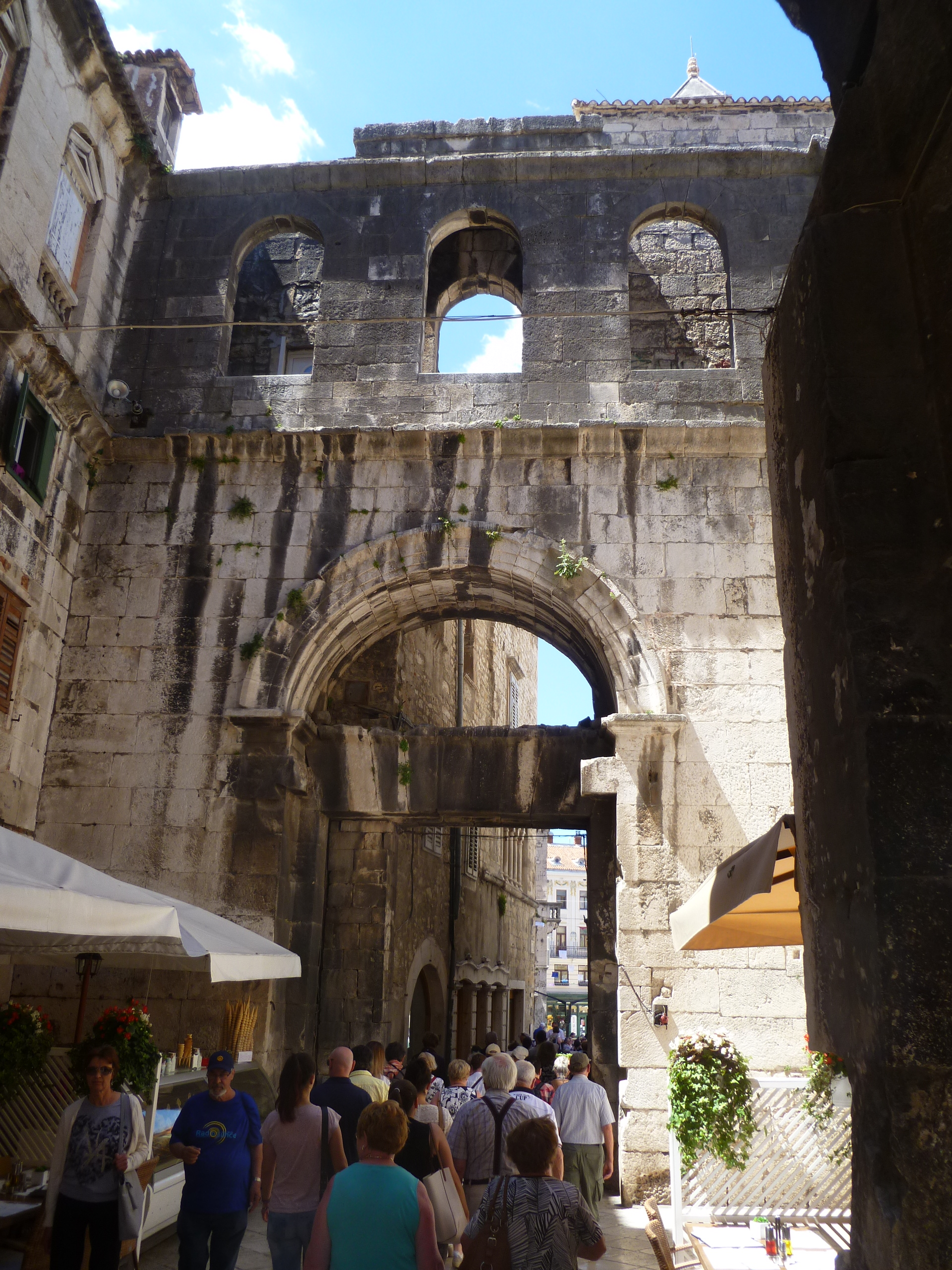
- View of The Iron Gate from 2015

- Location within Croatia
- 43°30′31″N 16°26′21″E
- Type: Gatehouse
- Location: Split, Croatia

History
- Built: 4th century AD
- Built by: Diocletian

Site notes
- Architectural style: Roman

The Iron Gate (Croatian: Željezna vrata, Latin: Porta ferrea), or "the Western Gate", is one of the four principal Roman gates into the stari grad (old town) of Split that was once Diocletian's Palace. Originally a military gate from which troops entered the complex, the gate is the only one to have remained in continuous use to the present day.

== History ==
During the late antiquity, the gate was known as the Porta Occidentalis ("the Western Gate"). During the persecutions under Theodosius I, a relief sculpture of Nike, the Roman goddess of victory (which stood on the lintel) was removed from the gate, later in the 5th century, Christians engraved a Cross in its place.

In the 6th century, above the gate a small church dedicated to St Theodore was built. This coincided with the complex seeing an influx of refugees from outlining communities, similar churches were over the Golden Gate, the Silver Gate, and the Bronze Gate. Above the Church of Our Lady of the Belfry a pre-Romanesque bell tower was erected in the 11th century and the oldest preserved bell tower on the Adriatic coast. In the 11th century, the church was rebuilt and rededicated, now known as the church of our Lady of the Belfry or Church of Our Lady of the Belfry, where an image of Our Lady of Belfryis preserved. Later a clock was added to outface of the gate. During the Middle Ages the area inside the gate was used as a courthouse.

After the expansion of the city from the palace to the west, the Iron Gate remained in operation as a city gate with a guard house. The Romanesque bell tower partially concealed the left side of the gate, on the right the palace of the family Cipriani Benedetti, decorated with two unique six-sided windows. In later years, a Bazaar of small shops operated well into the 20th century.

== Description ==
The Porta Occidentalis was a secondary gate of Diocletian's palace, as it was not the main gate and was located in the middle of the west wall. Made up of two parts, an outer and inner gates designed as a defensive system the architecture has a rich profile, while the arch is easily profiled. Instead of blind arches and columns, a series of casual arcades are arranged.

These doors are located next to the propagator stairs, similar to the original ones, leading to the patrol corridor. The hallway on each side has three arcades of 1.45 x 2.90 ms on the inside and five on the outside. The width of the corridor is 1.20 m, the right part of the wall is 0.57, the left 0.45 m, and the total wall thickness is 2.22 m. The corridor is about 5.20 m high and the original rock stone cover a slab ending the height of the perimeter wall and is the only place in the palace where you can see the tip of the main wall. The relative height at that place is 15.75 m and the threshold is 1m lower than today's passage. The city clock is also of special interest as it has 24 digits (instead of the usual 12).

== Gallery ==
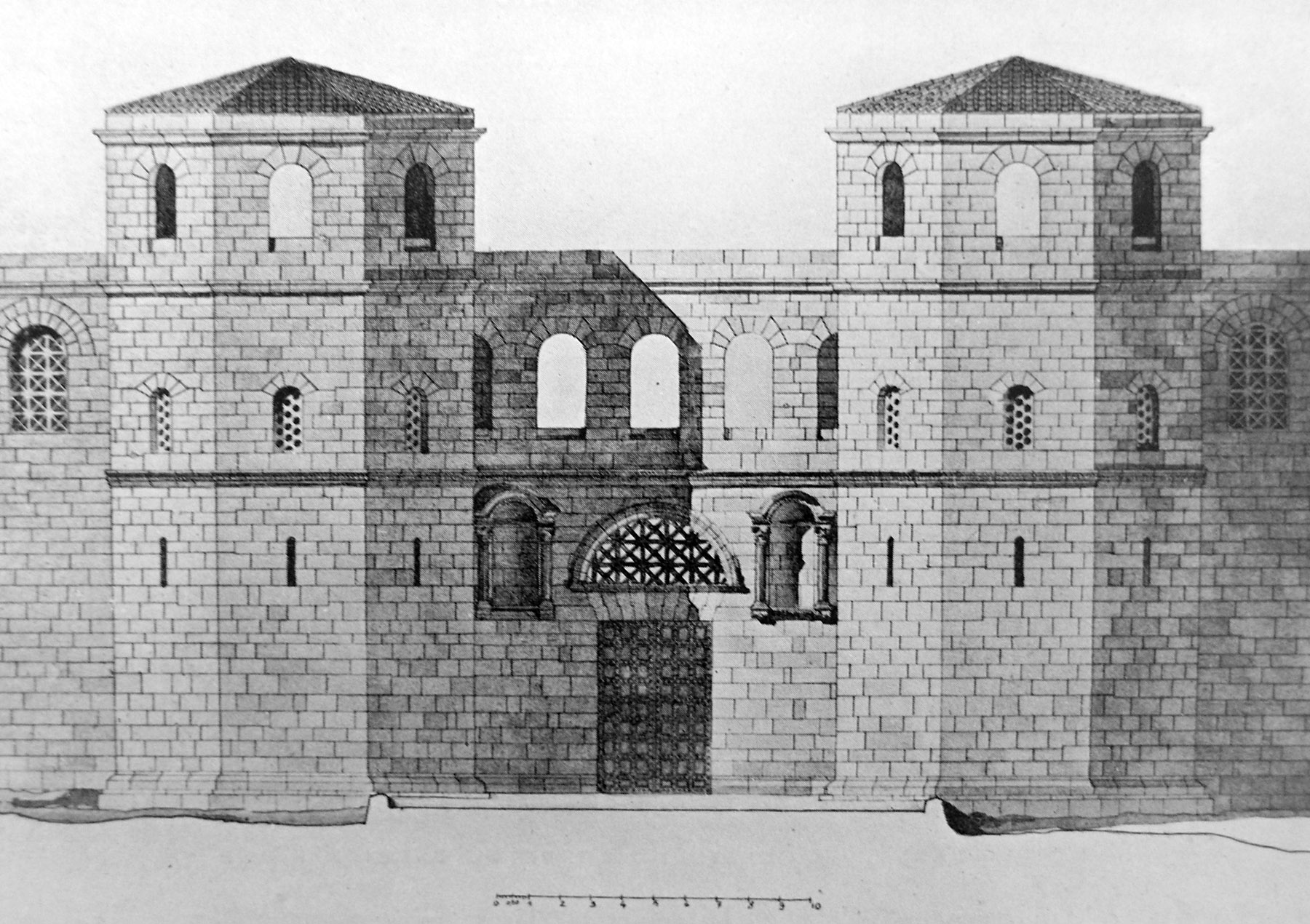
Reconstruction of the 5th century Porta Ferrea

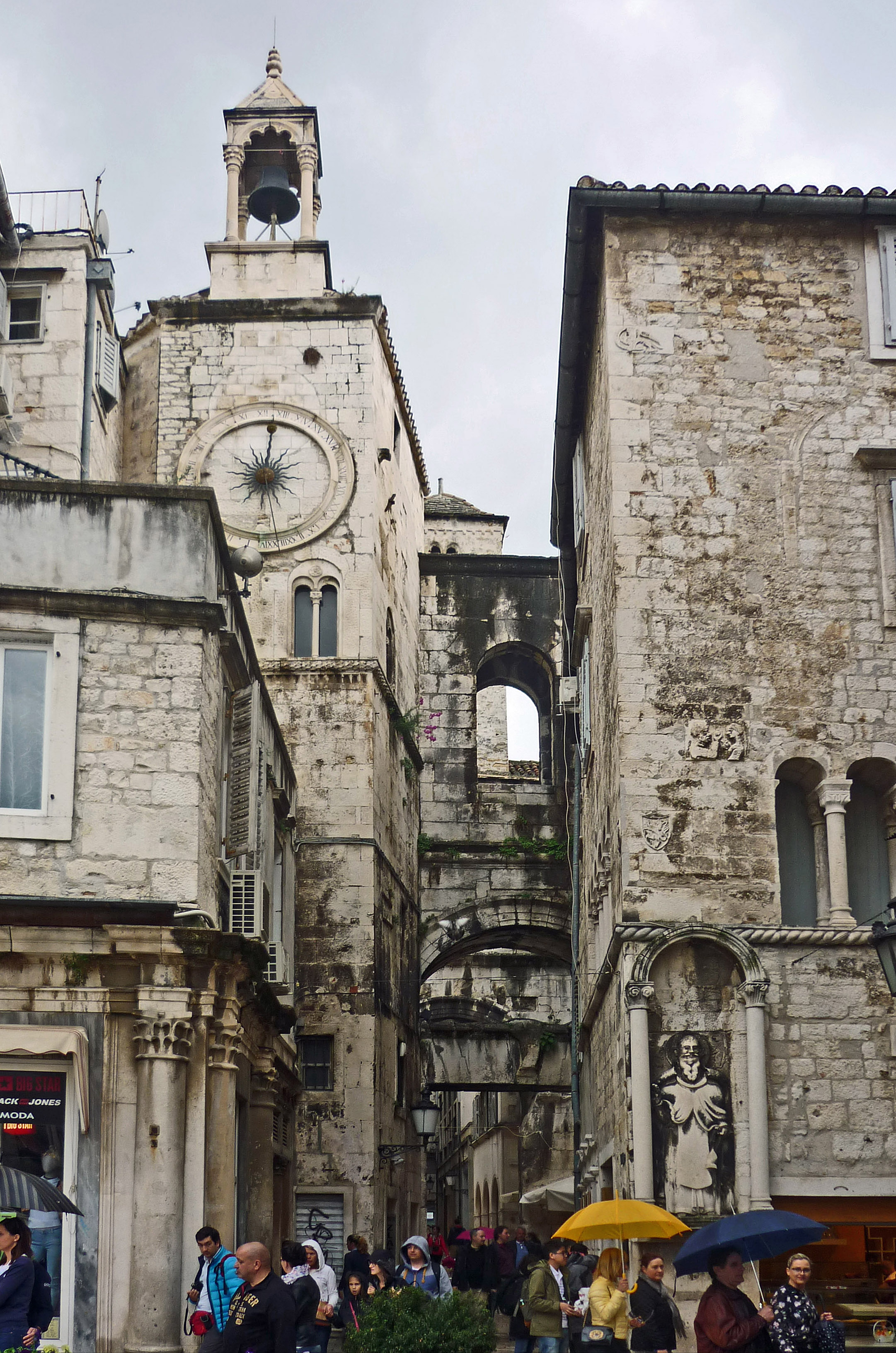
The Porta Ferrea and its adjacent buildings 2017

== See also ==
- Diocletian's Palace
- Vestibule, Split
- The Bronze Gate (Diocletian's Palace)
- The Golden Gate (Diocletian's Palace)
- The Silver Gate (Diocletian's Palace)
- The Golden Gate (Constantinople), Imperial entrance gate of the city of Constantinople, present-day Istanbul, Turkey
- Red Peristyle (an act of urban intervention done on the main square of the palace)
- Roman architecture
- Marjan, Croatia
- Salona
- Dalmatia
