= Bronze Gate (Diocletian's Palace) =

- Mjedena vrata (Croatian)
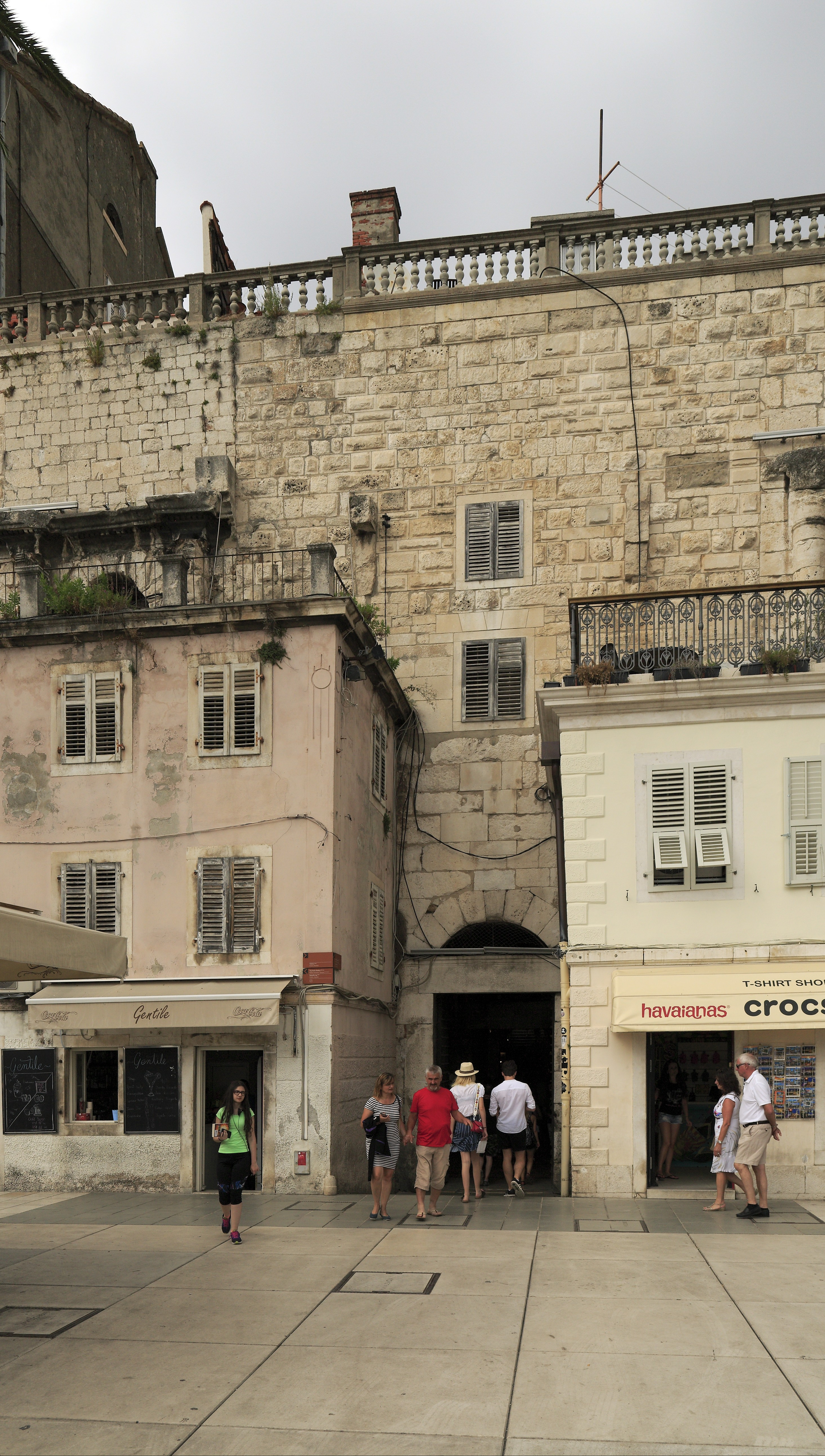
- Bronze Gate (Porta Meridionalis)

- Location within Croatia
- 43°30′27″N 16°26′23″E
- Type: Gate
- Location: Split, Croatia

History
- Built: 4th century AD
- Built by: Diocletian

Site notes
- Architectural style: Roman

The Bronze Gate (Croatian: Mjedena vrata, Latin: Porta Meridionalis), or "the Southern Gate", is the smaller of the four principal Roman gates into the stari grad (old town) of Split. Built as part of Diocletian's Palace, it was originally a sea gate from which the Emperor entered the complex by boat. Today it is the main entry point from the promenade to the cathedral.

== History ==
Inhabitants of the palace accessed the gate through a complex of basement rooms, constructed just below the peristyle. There was no promenade; instead, the sea lapped up against the walls, allowing ships to dock at the palace. Known in late antiquity as the Porta Meridionalis ("Southern Gate"), it was probably used by Diocletian to travel to and from the docks. During the Middle Ages the gate offered a direct exit to the sea and escape in the event of an attack on the palace, and consequently became known as the "Security Gate". Today it is the most frequently used palace gate, and a starting point for many guided tours because of its access to the Riva.

== Description ==
The Bronze Gate was the main gate of Diocletian's palace (via the sea), located in the middle of the south wall; today this section of the outer walls is the best preserved.

The gate is built in a style described by one modern guidebook as "anonymous and functional", and differs completely from the other three gates of the palace. It is smaller in size, lacks decoration, and is not supported by gatehouses on either side.

== See also ==
- Diocletian's Palace
- Vestibule, Split
- The Golden Gate (Diocletian's Palace)
- The Iron Gate (Diocletian's Palace)
- The Silver Gate (Diocletian's Palace)
- The Golden Gate (Constantinople), imperial entrance gate of the city of Constantinople, present-day Istanbul, Turkey
- Dalmatia
- Roman architecture
