= Red Peristyle =

Urban intervention in Split, Croatia

Red Peristyle (Croatian: Crveni peristil) was an urban intervention in Diocletian's Palace in the city of Split, Croatia, performed on 11 January 1968, when its peristyle (main court) was painted red. This was also the name of the group responsible for the intervention, which was formed in 1966. The group had a destructive approach similar to Marcel Duchamp's post-urban art of the 1960s. A number of other actions were recognized as the work of the same artistic group.

This illegal attack on public property was made more controversial by the choice of the colour. It was seen as an act of provocation towards communism in the former Yugoslavia. It was also prosecuted by the authorities as vandalism. Only one art historian, Cvito Fisković, made a statement in defence of the artists. Two of them, Pave Dulčić and Tomo Ćaleta, committed suicide, whereas Nenad Đapić and one other did not speak about the event. A myth of the Red Peristyle evolved and created a group of new "anti-heroes".

== See also ==
- Croatian art of the 20th century
- Anti communism § Performing arts
