= 1st National Assembly =

1st National Assembly or First National Assembly may refer to:

- First National Assembly at Epidaurus
- 1st legislature of the French Fifth Republic, which was the first National Assembly of the French Fifth Republic.
- 1st National Assembly of Namibia
- 1st National Assembly of Pakistan
- 1st National Assembly of the Philippines
- 1st National Assembly of Serbia
- 1st National Assembly for Wales
