= List of members of the National Assembly of Serbia, 1990–1992 =

== MPs by party ==
Name	Abbr.	Leader	Ideology	Political position	MPs	Gov′t
Socialist Party of Serbia; Социјалистичка партија Србије; Socijalistička partija Srbije	SPS	Slobodan Milošević	Communism; Yugoslavism	Left-wing	194 / 250	G
Serbian Renewal Movement; Српски покрет обнове Srpski pokret obnove	SPO	Vuk Drašković	Monarchism; Serbian nationalism	Right-wing	19 / 250	O
Democratic Fellowship of Vojvodina Hungarians; Демократска заједница војвођанских Мађара; Demokratska zajednica vojvođanskih Mađara	DZVM	András Ágoston	Hungarian minority politics Regionalism	Centre	8 / 250	O
Democratic Party; Демократска странка Demokratska stranka	DS	Dragoljub Mićunović	Social liberalism Pro-Europeanism	Centre	7 / 250	O
Party of Democratic Action of Sandžak; Странка демократске акције Санџака; Stranka demokratske akcije Sandžaka	SDA S	Sulejman Ugljanin	Bosniak minority politics Separatism	Right-wing	3 / 250	O
Union of Reform Forces of Yugoslavia; Савез реформских снага Југославије; Savez reformskih snaga Jugoslavije	SRSJ	Ante Marković	Social democracy Yugoslavism	Centre-left	2 / 250	O
Peasants Party of Serbia; Сељачка странка Србије; Seljačka Stranka Srbije	SSS	Milomir Babić	Agrarianism; Monarchism	Centre-right	2 / 250	O
Party for Democratic Action; Партија за демократско деловање Partija za demokratsko delovanje	PDD	Riza Halimi	Albanian minority politics National conservatism	Right-wing	1 / 250	O
