= Yugoslavism =

South Slavic unification ideology

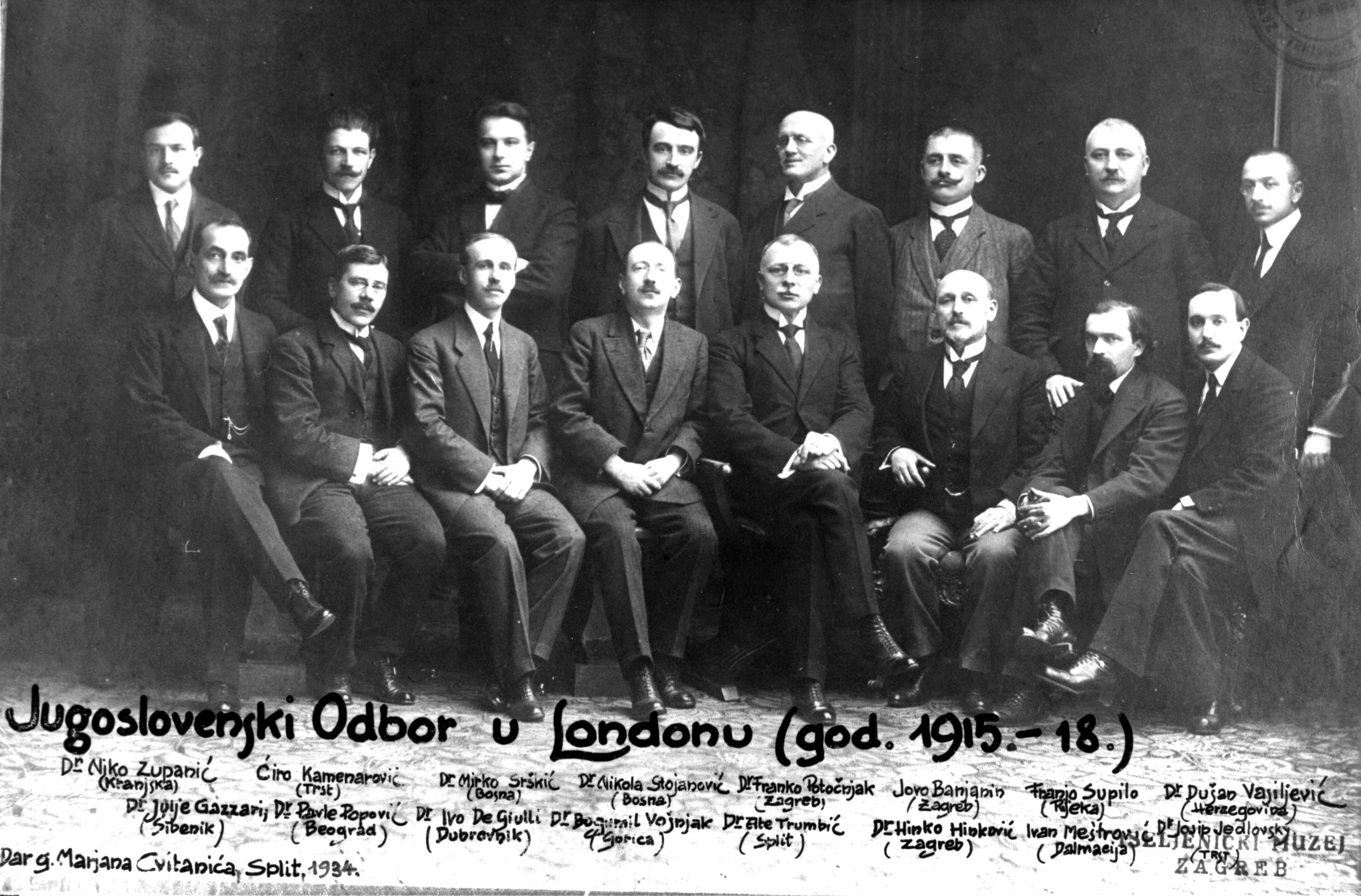
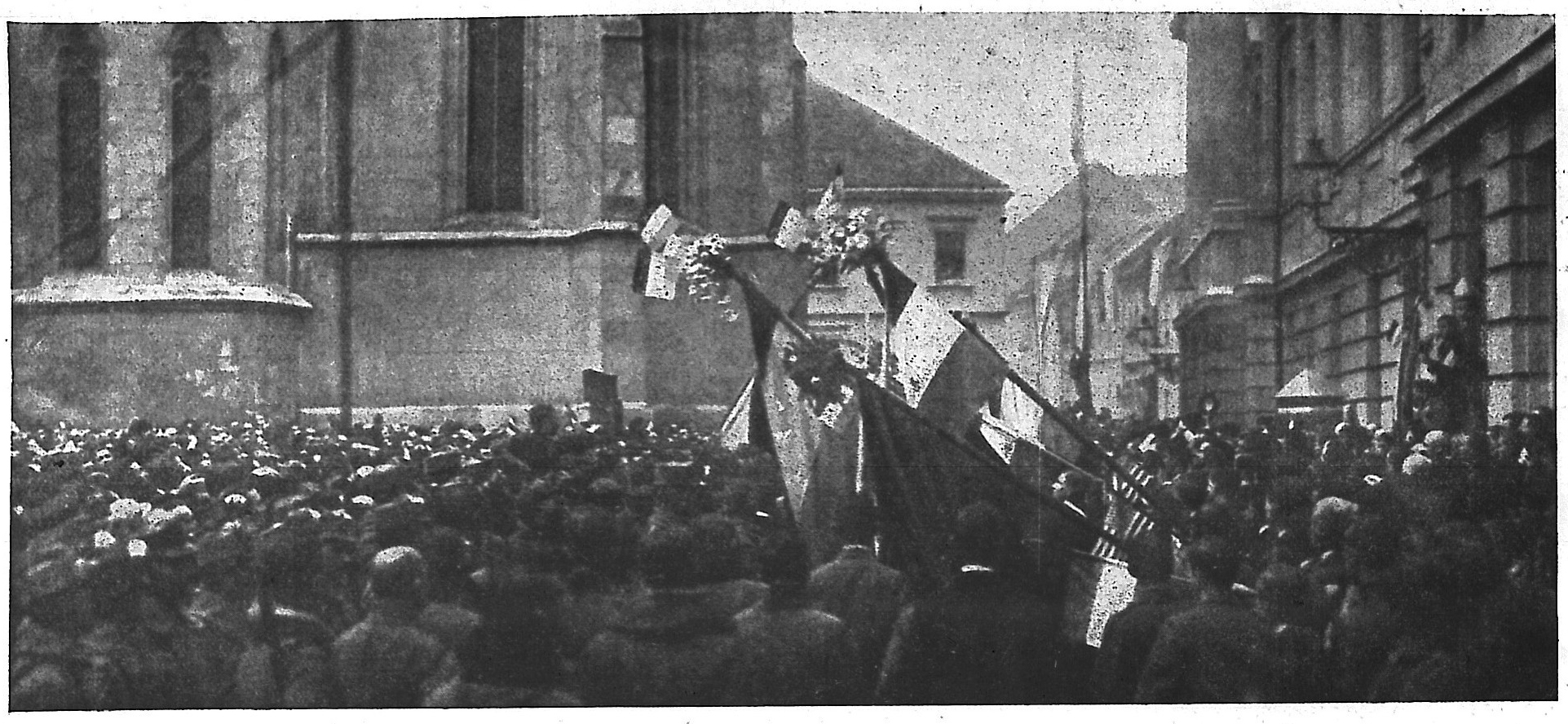
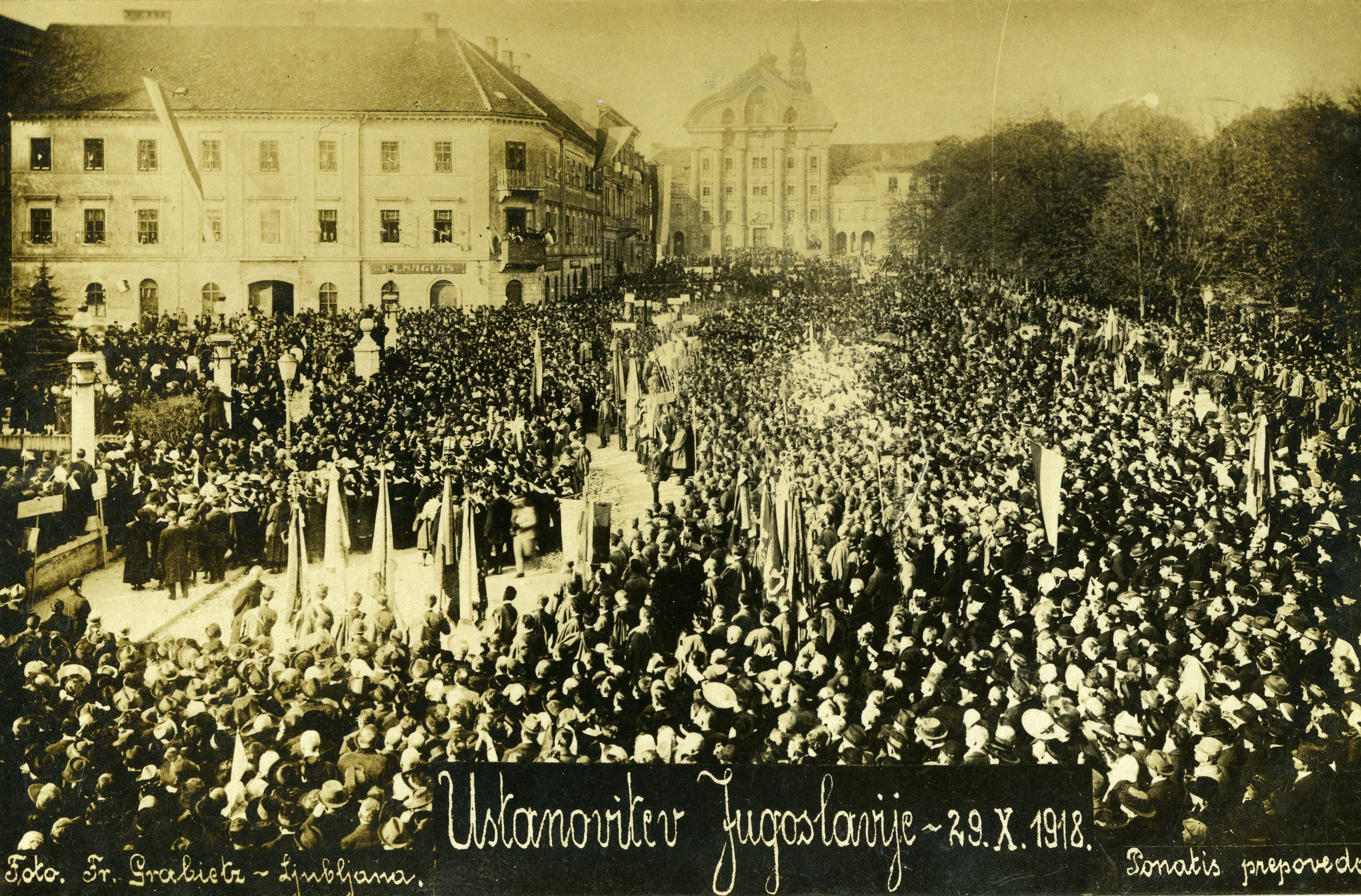
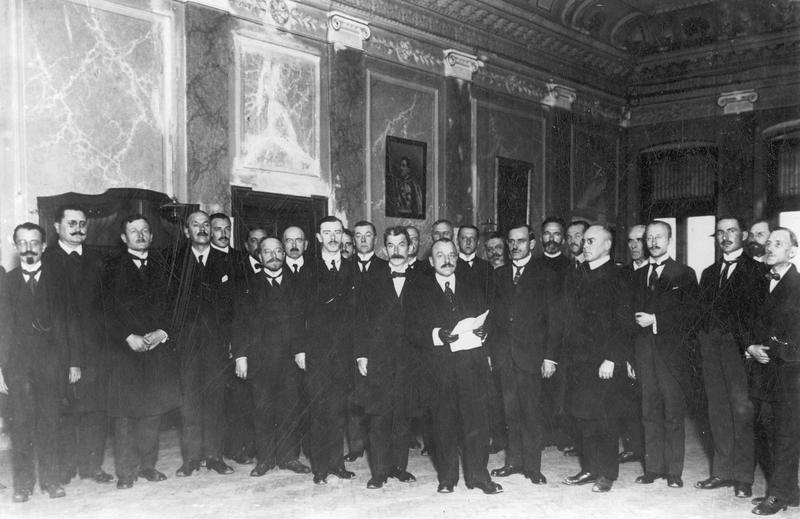
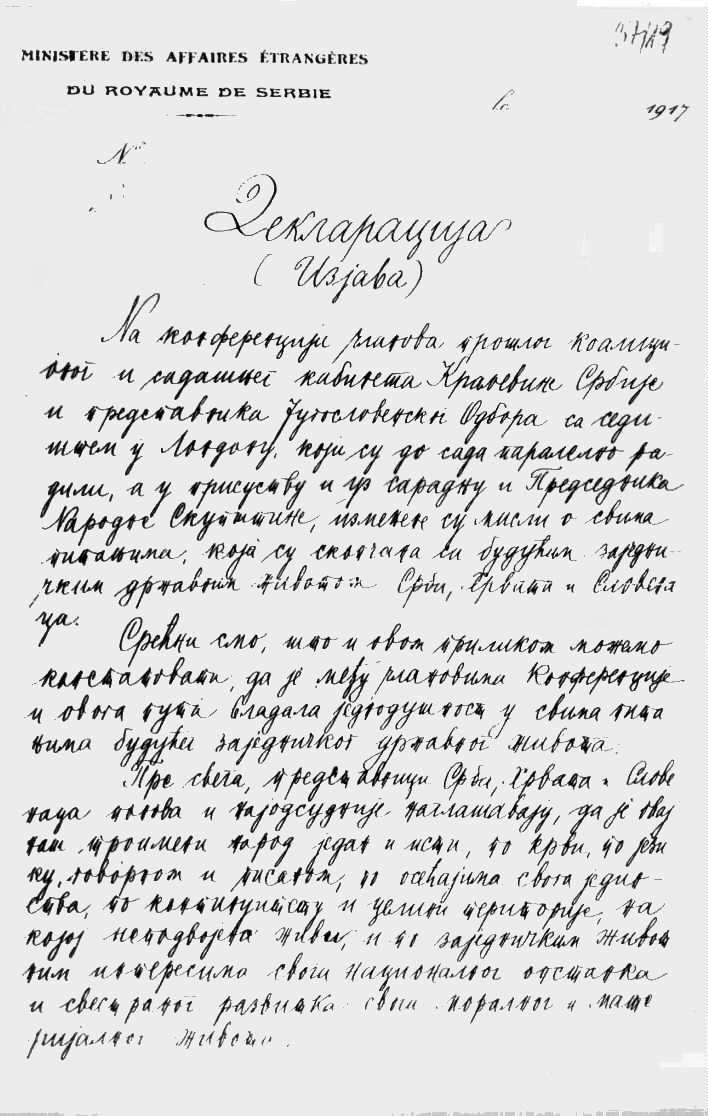
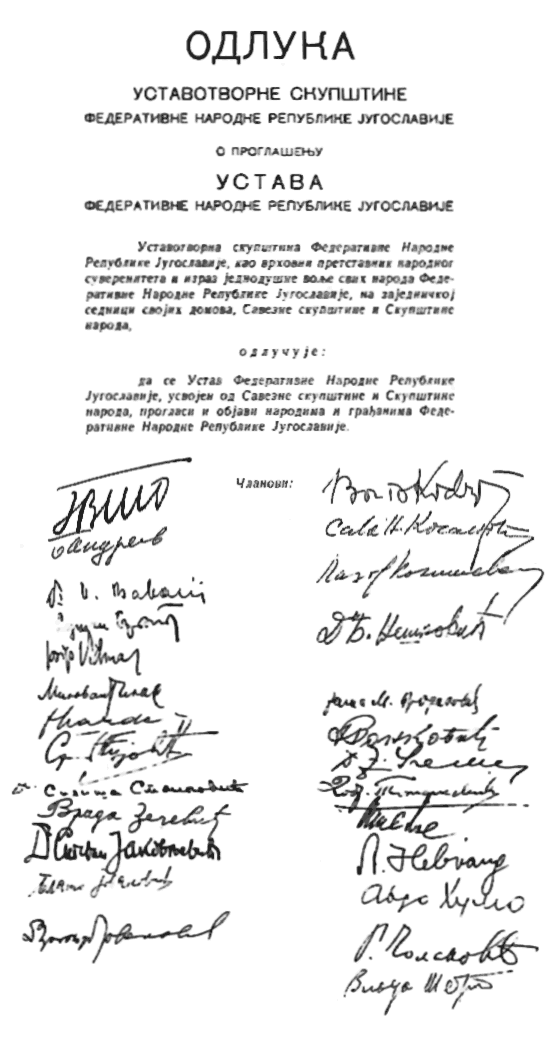
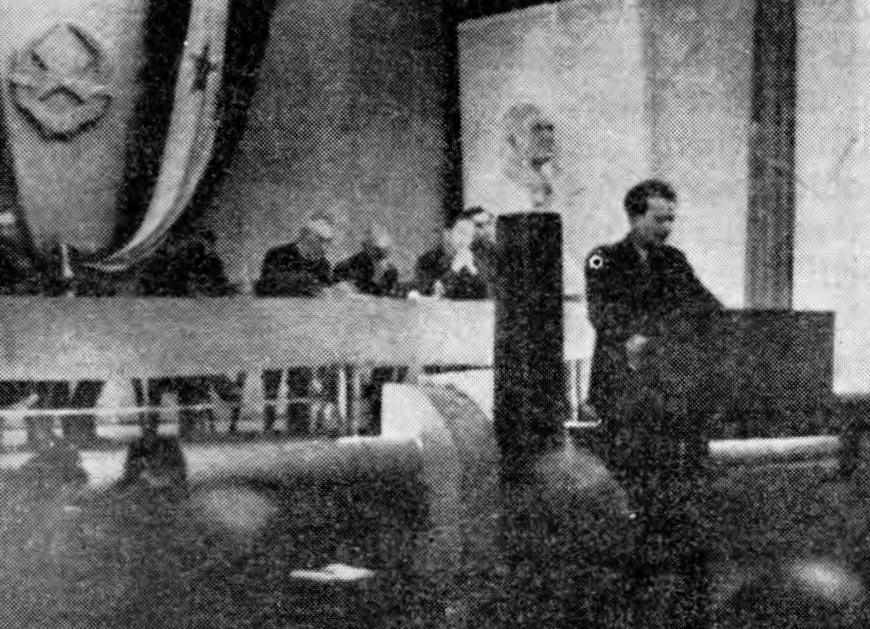
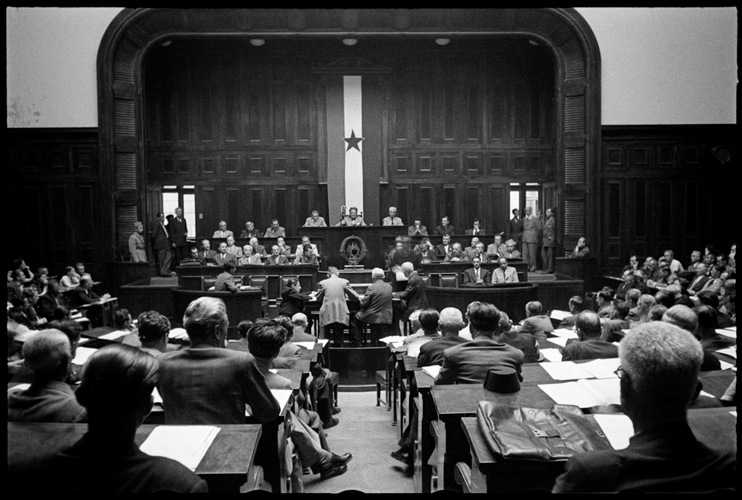
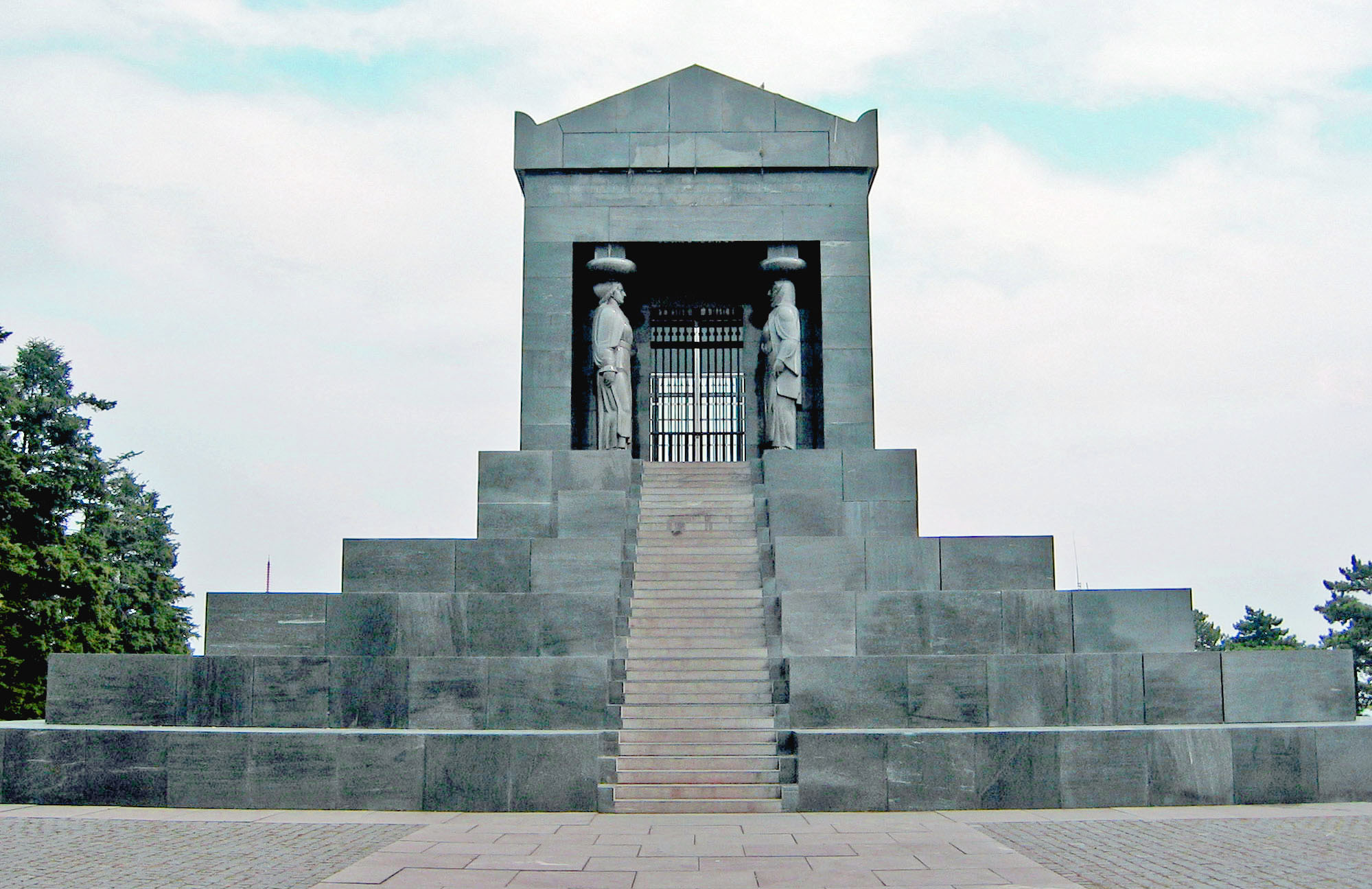
From top to bottom, left to right: the Yugoslav Committee in 1916; the celebration of the establishment of the State of Slovenes, Croats and Serbs in St. Mark's Square, Zagreb; the proclamation of the State of Slovenes, Croats and Serbs in Ljubljana's Congress Square; the National Council delegation addressing the Prince Regent Alexander; the Corfu Declaration; the Vidovdan Constitution; the decision on the promulgation of the 1946 Yugoslav Constitution, the second session of AVNOJ in Jajce; the third session of AVNOJ in Belgrade, preparing for the second Yugoslavia's Constitutional Assembly; and the Monument to the Unknown Hero by Ivan Meštrović on Avala Hill in Belgrade.

Yugoslavism, Yugoslavdom, or Yugoslav nationalism is an ideology supporting the notion that the South Slavs, namely the Bosniaks, Bulgarians, Croats, Macedonians, Montenegrins, Serbs, and Slovenes, belong to a single Yugoslav nation separated by diverging historical circumstances, forms of speech, and religious divides. During the interwar period, Yugoslavism became predominant in, and then the official ideology of, the Kingdom of Yugoslavia. There were two major forms of Yugoslavism in the period, the first of which is the regime-favoured integral Yugoslavism, promoting unitarism, centralisation, and unification of the country's ethnic groups into a single Yugoslav nation, by coercion if necessary. The approach was also applied to languages spoken in the Kingdom. The main alternative was federalist Yugoslavism, which advocated the autonomy of the historical lands in the form of a federation and gradual unification without outside pressure. Both agreed on the concept of National Oneness developed as an expression of the strategic alliance of South Slavs in Austria-Hungary in the early 20th century. The concept was meant as a notion that the South Slavs belong to a single "race", were of "one blood", and had shared language. It was considered neutral regarding the choice of centralism or federalism.

The Yugoslavist idea has roots in the 1830s Illyrian movement in Habsburg Croatia, where a group of intellectuals saw the unity of South Slavs within the Austrian Empire or outside of it as a protection against Germanisation and Magyarisation. Cooperative talks began with Serbian politicians and working to standardise Serbo-Croatian as a common language with orthographer Vuk Karadžić, with limited success. Following the Austro-Hungarian Compromise of 1867, the concept was rivalled by Trialism. Control of the Balkans by the Ottoman Empire and Austria-Hungary prevented practical implementation of Yugoslavist ideas until the Ottomans were pushed out of the Balkans in the 1912 First Balkan War and Austria-Hungary disintegrated in the final days of the First World War. During the war, preparations for unification began in the form of the Niš Declaration of Serbian war aims, the establishment of the Yugoslav Committee to represent South Slavs living in Austria-Hungary, and the adoption of the Corfu Declaration on principles of unification. The short-lived State of Slovenes, Croats and Serbs was proclaimed in the South Slavic lands formerly ruled by the Habsburgs at the end of the First World War. Its leadership primarily wanted unification with Serbia on a federal basis, while Serbia preferred a centralised state.

The unification took place on 1 December 1918, when the Kingdom of Serbs, Croats and Slovenes was proclaimed. In the first years of the new kingdom, politics became increasingly ethnic as individual political parties became identified with particular nations within the country. Similarly, integral Yugoslavism became associated with the regime, and the political struggle against the government was increasingly equated with the ethnic struggle between the Serbs (identified with the regime) and various ethnic groups – most often the Croats as the most vocal political opposition to the regime. Alliances shifted over time and were not always ethnic-based. They depended largely on the form of Yugoslavism adopted by those concerned. The outcome of the political debates of the first few years of the new country resulted in the Vidovdan Constitution – deemed illegitimate by many – and in regime- and opposition-sponsored violence. The state abandoned integral Yugoslavism in 1939 when a settlement was reached with the Croat opposition leader Vladko Maček with the Cvetković–Maček Agreement. The regime attempted to unify the common language. Lack of standardisation of Serbo-Croatian brought about the practice of publication of official documents in the Ekavian speech favoured in Serbia, often in Cyrillic script not normally used by the Croats or the Slovenes to write. The Serbian Orthodox Church was given preference by the regime. The regime tried reducing the power of the Catholic Church in the Kingdom, promoting conversions and rival churches, and refraining from ratification of the Concordat with the Holy See over Serbian Orthodox Church protests. Before the First World War, a synthetic Yugoslavist culture was largely confined to Croat artists and writers. Ivan Meštrović became the most prominent among them at a 1911 exhibition in Rome. Disillusioned after the unification, most artists and writers distanced themselves from the synthetic culture.

After the Second World War, the Communist Party of Yugoslavia (KPJ) ruled the country. The KPJ adopted a formal commitment to federalism in a highly centralised state, promoting social Yugoslavism and a diversely interpreted notion of "brotherhood and unity". The 1948 Tito–Stalin split pushed the KPJ to gradual decentralisation until the mid-1950s, when a Yugoslavist campaign was launched to reverse the course, leading to a debate on levels of decentralisation. Centralist forces were defeated by the mid-1960s. Significant decentralisation occurred during, and in the aftermath of, the Croatian Spring. In 1987, Slovenian intellectuals cited Yugoslavism as the main threat to Slovenian identity. The issues raised by them contributed to the motivation for a 1990 proposal to restructure Yugoslavia as a confederation and for subsequent Slovenian and Croatian declarations of independence marking the breakup of Yugoslavia.

== Background ==
The South Slavs are a subgroup of Slavic peoples comprising the Bulgarians, Croats, and Serbs whose national identity developed long before modern nationalism through collective memory of their mediaeval states. Furthermore, the South Slavs also include the Bosniaks (i.e. Muslim Slavs of Bosnia and Herzegovina), Macedonians, Montenegrins, and Slovenes.

In the early 19th century, the Balkans were divided between the Austrian and the Ottoman empires. The Austrian Empire comprised the Slovene Lands, the Kingdoms of Croatia, Slavonia, Dalmatia with significant Croat populations, and Vojvodina, containing a substantial Serb population. The Hofkriegsrat-controlled Military Frontier separated the Kingdoms of Croatia and Slavonia from each other and Ottoman territory. Substantial Croat and Slovene populations lived in Istria, organised as the Kingdom of Illyria. In the Ottoman Empire, the semi-independent Principality of Serbia developed in the early 19th century. The empire included the Bosnia Eyalet as its westernmost part between Serbia and the Austrian realms. There was also the unrecognised Prince-Bishopric of Montenegro.

== Before Yugoslavia ==
=== Illyrian movement ===
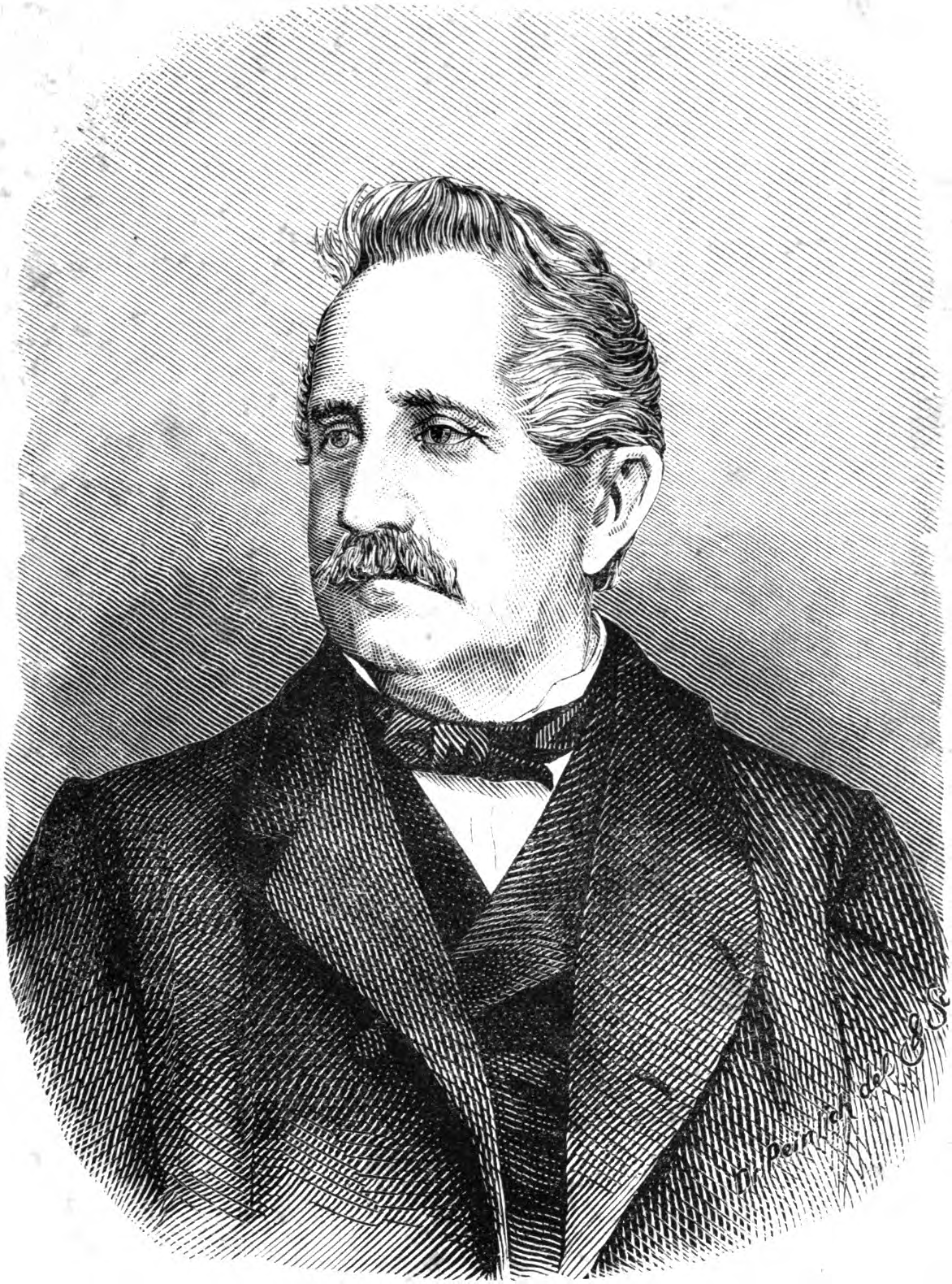
Ljudevit Gaj led the Illyrian movement in the 1830s.

The idea of South Slavic unity predates the creation of Yugoslavia by nearly a century. First developed in Habsburg Croatia by a group of Croat intellectuals led by Ljudevit Gaj in the 1830s, the concept developed through diverse forms of the proposed unity from varying levels of cultural and political cooperation or integration. Members of the Illyrian movement held that the South Slavs could unite around a shared origin, variants of a shared language, and the natural right to live in their own polity. They argued Croatian history is a part of a wider history of the South Slavs and that Croats and Serbs, as well as potentially Slovenes and Bulgarians, were parts of a single 'Illyrian' nation (using that word as a neutral term). The movement began as a cultural one, promoting Croatian national identity and integration of all Croatian provinces within the Austrian Empire. The reference to "Croatian provinces" was normally interpreted as a reference to the Kingdoms of Croatia, Slavonia, and Dalmatia, and sometimes a part of or the entirety of Bosnia and Herzegovina. A wider aim was to gather all South Slavs, or Jugo-Slaveni (Note: Coined by compounding Croatian language nouns 'jug' and 'Slaveni' meaning South and Slavs respectively.) for short, in a commonwealth within or outside of the Empire. The movement's two directions became known as Croatianism and Yugoslavism, (Note: Some sources also refer to it as the Yugoslav nationalism, or Yugoslavdom.) respectively, meant to counter Germanisation and Magyarisation. In the 1830s and 1840s, there were very few proponents of the Illyrian idea. Virtually all of them were Croats from the ranks of intellectuals – clergy, officials, artists, students, and soldiers. By 1910, they rallied around the People's Party (NS) but accounted for barely one per cent of the population.

In mid-19th-century Slovene Lands, early Slovenian nationalists felt closer to Czechs or Russians than other South Slavs, seeking solutions within a reformed framework of the Habsburg empire. Support for Serbo-Croat cooperation grew as a reaction to ongoing Germanisation, but most Slovene intellectuals rejected the Illyrian ideas.

=== Illyrian contribution to linguistic unity ===
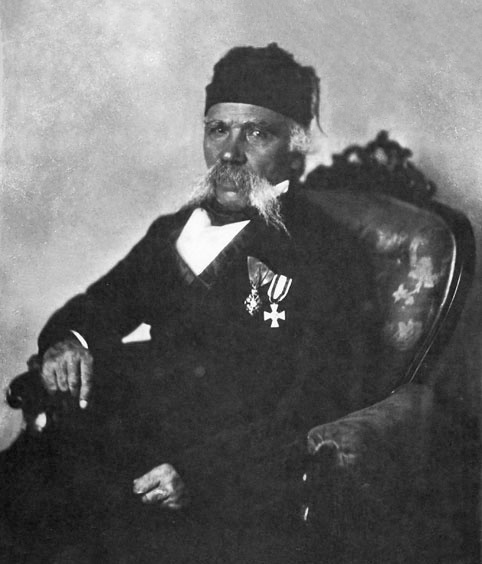
Vuk Karadžić held that a common language was the foundation of a nation.

Since the Middle Ages, Croats spoke three supradialects – named after forms of the word "what" – Chakavian, Kajkavian, and western Shtokavian. The Serbs spoke two – eastern Shtokavian and the Prizren–Timok dialect. From the 12th century, the two Shtokavian dialects grew increasingly mutually similar and more distinct from the other dialects.

Gaj supported the idea proposed by Serbian orthographer Vuk Karadžić that a common language was the foundation of a nation. Karadžić held that Serbs and Croats could be united by a common orthography. To support this aim, the Illyrian movement chose to promote Shtokavian as the standard literary language because nearly all Serbs spoke it. This represented a sacrifice made on purpose – most prominent Illyrians spoke Kajkavian, normally used in Zagreb. This led to the Vienna Literary Agreement on the standardisation of the Serbo-Croatian language as the common language. This also produced nationalist claims that Serbs were Eastern Orthodox Croats and that Croats were Roman Catholic Serbs, as well as that the Slavic Muslims were Islamised Serbs or Croats – denying the existence of the "rival" ethnic groups. Despite the agreement, the Illyrians did not adopt the standard proposed by Karadžić for another four decades.

Croats did not universally accept Gaj's linguistic determination of a nation. The founder of the Party of Rights (SP), Ante Starčević, held that the existence of states gives rise to the existence of nations. Starčević cited France and England as examples of such nation building. He applied the idea of a state as the foundation of a nation to the Croats by advocating the concept of the Croatian state right. Josip Frank, Starčević's successor at the helm of the SP, argued that nations had different racial traits, assuming an anti-Serbian stance.

The Illyrians found little support among Serbs in Habsburg lands, as they viewed Serbia as a nucleus of South Slavic unification, ascribing to it the role played by Piedmont-Sardinia in Italian unification. Most Serb intellectuals dismissed the modified Shtokavian as a threat to the liturgical Church Slavonic and Gaj's Latin alphabet, recommending Croats use the Cyrillic script as a truly Slavic alphabet. In 1913, there was an attempt to create a Serbo-Croatian standard by Serbian literary critic Jovan Skerlić. He proposed Croats accept the "Eastern dialect" while Serbs would abandon the Cyrillic script. The plan had a mixed reception in Croatia and was abandoned at the outbreak of the war.

=== 19th-century Serbia and the Yugoslavist idea ===
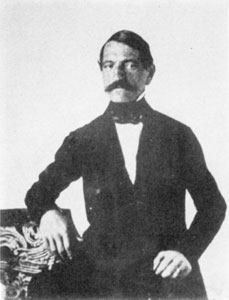
Ilija Garašanin wrote on the establishment of Greater Serbia and worked with Josip Juraj Strossmayer on an anti-Ottoman South Slavic coalition.

Vojvodina Serbs favoured closer ties with or joining the de facto independent Serbia over the Illyrian ideas. Serbia discouraged their irredentism to preserve good relations with Austria. In the 1860s, within the framework of efforts by Prince Mihailo Obrenović to establish an anti-Ottoman coalition, Roman Catholic bishop Josip Juraj Strossmayer and Serbian Foreign Minister Ilija Garašanin agreed to work towards establishing a Yugoslav state independent of Austria and the Ottomans. The plan, inspired by the Risorgimento (Italian unification), called for unification of the lands from Carinthia, Carniola, and Southern Styria in the north to Albania, Bulgaria, and Thrace in the south. The scheme was mostly used to promote the unification of South Slavic lands in Austria-Hungary around Croatia and South Slavic regions of the Ottoman Empire around Serbia. The plan was abandoned after the assassination of Mihailo and the Austro-Hungarian Compromise of 1867.

As Serbia achieved independence through the 1878 Treaty of Berlin, the Yugoslav idea became irrelevant in the country. Before the 1912 First Balkan War, Serbia was mono-ethnic, and Serbian nationalism sought to include (those considered to be) Serbs into the state. It portrayed the work of bishops Strossmayer and Franjo Rački as a scheme to establish Greater Croatia. There was pressure to expand Serbia by a group of Royal Serbian Army officers known as the Black Hand. They carried out the May 1903 coup, installing the Karađorđević dynasty to power, and then organised nationalist actions in "unredeemed Serbian provinces" specified as Bosnia, Herzegovina, Montenegro, Old Serbia (meaning Kosovo), Macedonia, Croatia, Slavonia, Syrmia, Vojvodina, and Dalmatia. This echoed Garašanin's 1844 Načertanije – a treatise anticipating the collapse of the Ottoman Empire, calling for the establishment of Greater Serbia to pre-empt Russian or Austrian expansion into the Balkans and unifying all Serbs into a single state.

=== Trialism in Austria-Hungary ===
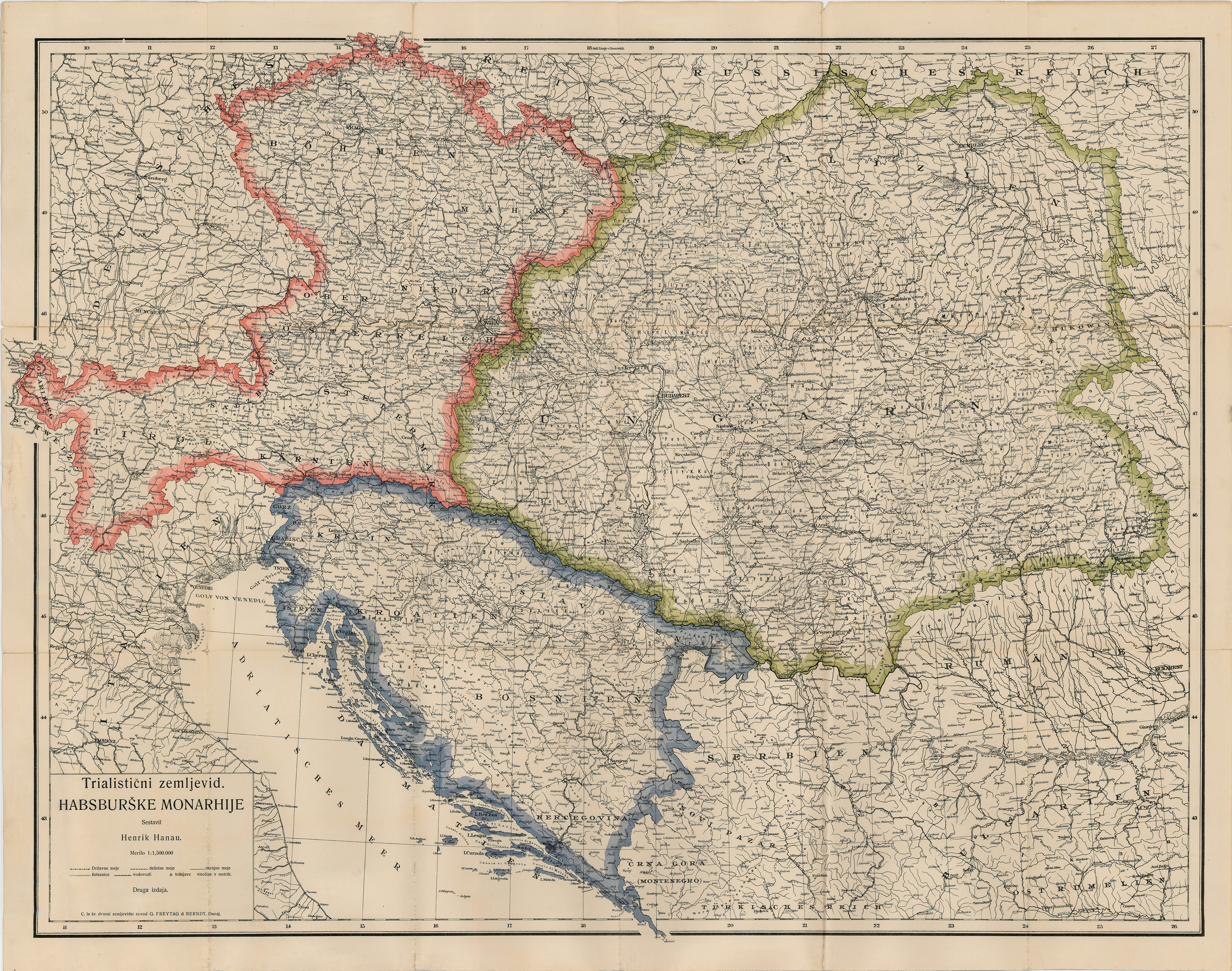
A proposed trialist administrative reform of Austria-Hungary from 1905

While the Illyrians achieved the goal of raising Croatian national awareness by 1850, they failed elsewhere. In the 1850s, the NS, Strossmayer and Rački championed the Illyrian idea. Fearing Drang nach Osten ('drive to the east'), they believed Germanisation and Magyarisation could only be resisted through unity with other Slavs, especially the Serbs. They advocated the unification of Croatia, Slavonia, and Dalmatia as the Triune Kingdom expanded to include other South Slavs in Austria (or Austria-Hungary after the Compromise of 1867) before joining other South Slavic polities in a federation or confederation. The proposed consolidation of variously defined Croatian or South Slavic lands led to proposals for trialism in Austria-Hungary, accommodating a South Slavic polity with a rank equal to the Kingdom of Hungary. Croatia and Slavonia were consolidated with the Military Frontier into Croatia-Slavonia in 1881. Nonetheless, divisions remained as they were among the Lands of the Crown of Saint Stephen – the Hungarian part of the monarchy – while Dalmatia and Istria were included in Austrian Cisleithania. There was also a significant Croatian population in Bosnia and Herzegovina, annexed by Austria-Hungary in 1908. Unification of those lands became the central issue for Croatian–Slavonian politics in the trialist context.

Béni Kállay, the administrator of the Condominium of Bosnia and Herzegovina, introduced the concept of Bosnians, rejecting ethnic and religious divisions. Kállay's project entailed a campaign to standardise the Bosnian language. It was viewed as having a key cultural, social, and political role in strengthening the Austro-Hungarian rule. Kállay's language policy coincided with the formal introduction of the orthographic norms set out in the Vienna Literary Agreement by the administration of Ban Károly Khuen-Héderváry in Croatia-Slavonia in the 1890s. At the same time, linguistic differences grew with the departure of the Belgrade-based Serbian standard from the Karadžić-proposed form by the adoption of Ekavian speech. The start of Austrian rule in Bosnia and Herzegovina – and the consequent reorienting of Serbian political priorities – prompted the shift. Macedonia became the priority and Ekavian was deemed better suited for expansion into the region. During the Austro-Hungarian rule in Bosnia and Herzegovina, a religious community developed to preserve the cultural and religious autonomy of the Islamic population, renouncing a nationalist agenda. The secular Bosnian Muslim intelligentsia was divided into pro-Croat and pro-Serb factions, declaring themselves instead as Croats or Serbs of Islamic faith. In 1878–1903, strong antagonism developed between Serbs and Croats as the agendas for the creation of Greater Serbia and the Triune Kingdom clashed over the issue of Serbian or Croatian control of Bosnia and Herzegovina. This clash was used and exacerbated by Héderváry, whose divide and rule policies increased mutual hostilities. They also resulted in the decline in support for Yugoslavist ideas in the period.

== End of two empires ==
=== Branching concept ===
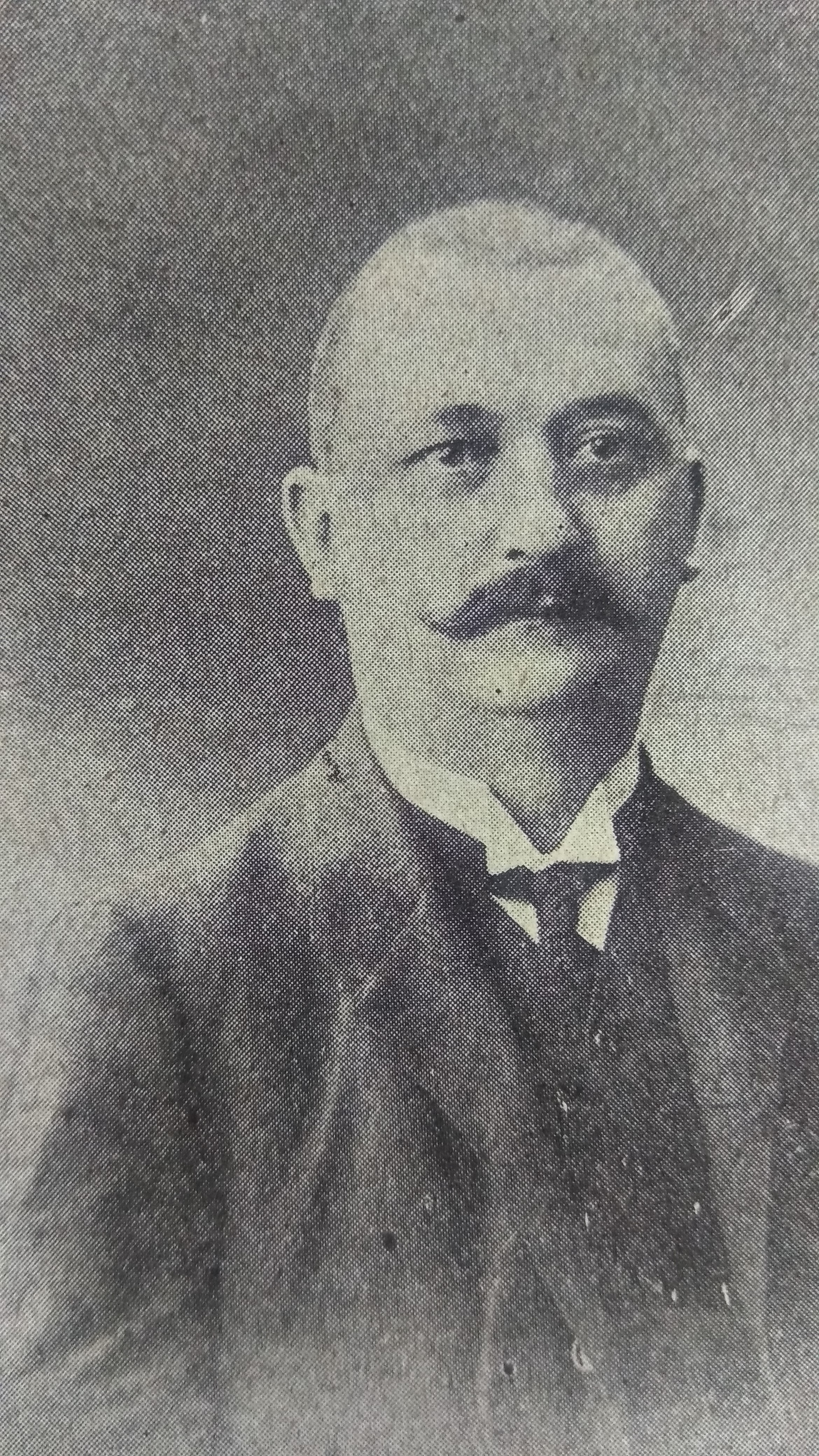
Frano Supilo co-founded the Croat-Serb Coalition with Svetozar Pribićević.

In the first two decades of the 20th century, various Croat, Serb, and Slovene national programmes adopted Yugoslavism in different, conflicting, or mutually exclusive forms. Yugoslavism became a pivotal idea for establishing a South Slavic political union. Most Serbs equated the idea with a Greater Serbia under a different name or a vehicle to bring all Serbs into a single state. For many Croats and Slovenes, Yugoslavism protected them against Austrian and Hungarian challenges to the preservation of their Croat and Slovene identities and political autonomy.

The proponents of the political union pursued different forms of Yugoslavism. Unitarist or integral Yugoslavism and federalist Yugoslavism were the two major categories. The former denied the existence of separate nations or sought to supersede them by the introduction of a single Yugoslav nation. Some sources draw a distinction between the unitarists and the integralists. According to them, the unitarists believe South Slavs are a single ethnic unit but refrain from active unification – unlike the integralists, who actively work to amalgamate the Yugoslav nation. The federalists acknowledged the existence of separate nations and wanted to accommodate them in a new political union through a federation or another system affording various South Slavic nations political and cultural autonomy. Some sources also identify a group associated with the concept of Yugoslavism as the pseudo-Yugoslavs tactically choosing to pursue an apparently Yugoslavist agenda to implement specific national interests.

The concept of National Oneness (Note: Serbo-Croatian: Narodno jedinstvo) originated among a group of politically active students known as the Progressive Youth. It was quickly adopted and developed by the Croat-Serb Coalition (HSK) as an expression of a strategic alliance of South Slavs in Austria-Hungary in the early 20th century. It did not imply unitarist Yugoslavism. While the concept was meant as an expression of the notion that the South Slavs belong to a single "race", were of "one blood", and had one shared language, it was considered neutral regarding the possibility of centralised or decentralised government in a common state.

=== Defeat of the Ottoman Empire ===
The existence of the Ottoman Empire and Austria-Hungary in the Balkans was a barrier to the political unification of the South Slavs. This changed in late 1912 with the outbreak of the First Balkan War. In the conflict, the Ottomans lost most of the Balkan possessions as Serbia, Greece, and Bulgaria took control of Vardar, Aegean and Pirin Macedonia, respectively. The region's borders were to be adjusted under the mediation of Nicholas II of Russia. However, the war produced a rivalry between Bulgaria on one side and Greece and Serbia on the other. After suffering the greatest losses in the war, Bulgaria was dissatisfied with the size of its territorial gains. To protect against Bulgaria, the Greek–Serbian Alliance of 1913 was concluded, and the allies specified territorial claims against Bulgaria. In 1913, Bulgaria attacked Serbia, starting the Second Balkan War, to expand its territory but ended in further losses.

=== Outbreak of the First World War ===
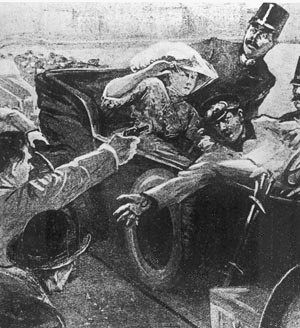
Depiction of the assassination of Archduke Franz Ferdinand

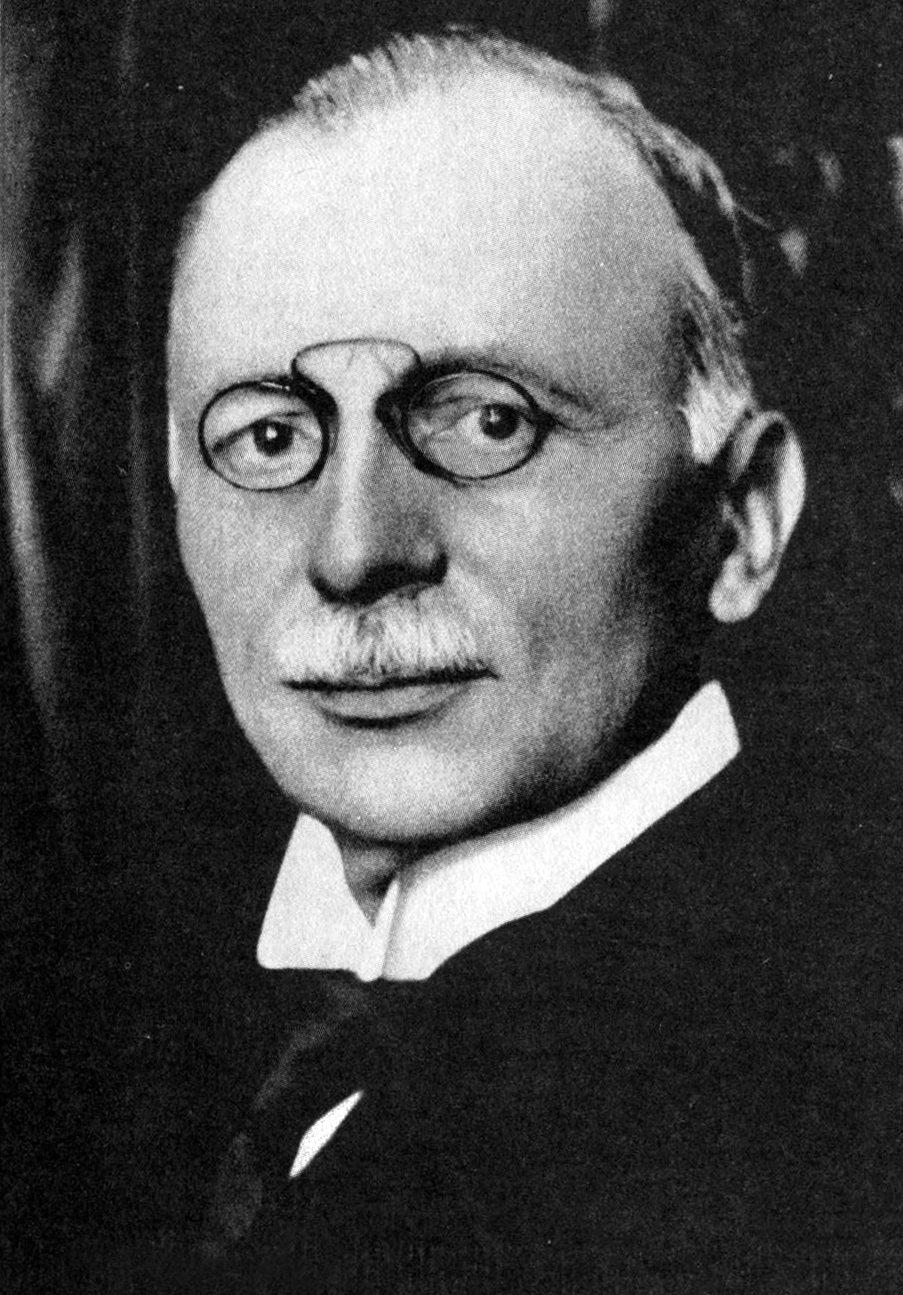
Ante Trumbić led the Yugoslav Committee in the run-up to the creation of Yugoslavia.

On 28 June 1914, Gavrilo Princip – a Bosnian Serb member of the Young Bosnia movement – assassinated Archduke Franz Ferdinand of Austria, heir presumptive to the throne of Austria-Hungary, in Sarajevo. The organisation, supported by the Black Hand, consisted of Yugoslavist nationalists advocating a political union of Serbs, Croats, Slavic Muslims, and Slovenes through revolutionary actions. The July Crisis and the outbreak of the First World War followed the assassination.

Since the outbreak of hostilities, Serbia had considered the war an opportunity for territorial expansion beyond Serb-inhabited areas. A committee tasked with determining war aims produced a programme to establish a Yugoslav state by adding Croatia-Slavonia, Slovene Lands, Vojvodina, Bosnia and Herzegovina, and Dalmatia. In the Niš Declaration, the National Assembly of Serbia announced the struggle to liberate and unify "unliberated brothers".

In 1915, the Yugoslav Committee was established as an ad hoc group with no official capacity. Its members thought that the Yugoslavist idea entered the final phase in 1903. That was the year the Khuen-Héderváry Administration ended, the year Kállay died, and the year of the dynastic change in Serbia. The committee, partially funded by the Serbian government, consisted of intellectuals and politicians from Austria-Hungary claiming to represent the interests of South Slavs. The president of the committee was Ante Trumbić, but its most prominent member was Frano Supilo, the co-founder of the ruling HSK in Croatia-Slavonia. Supilo urged the establishment of a Yugoslav state as a federation with Serbia (including Vojvodina), Croatia (including Slavonia and Dalmatia), Bosnia and Herzegovina, Slovenia, and Montenegro as its federal units. Supilo distrusted Serbian prime minister Nikola Pašić, a proponent of Greater Serbia, and cautioned the committee about Pašić's likely intentions. On the other hand, the committee learnt of the Treaty of London awarding the Kingdom of Italy parts of the Slovene Lands, Istria, and Dalmatia by the Triple Entente in return for an Italian alliance.

In May 1917, members of the Yugoslav Deputies' Club of the Imperial Council in Vienna drafted the May Declaration on the unification of Slovenes, Croats, and Serbs within Austria-Hungary and a trialist restructuring of the empire. Starčević's faction of the SP and the Croatian People's Peasant Party (HSS), led by Stjepan Radić, supported the declaration in the Diet of Hungary, where Croatia-Slavonia was represented. Frank's faction of the SP rejected the idea. The declaration was debated in the press for a year before the imperial authorities outlawed the proposal.

In June – July 1917, the Serbian government and the Yugoslav Committee held a series of meetings on Corfu. They discussed the future common state and produced the Corfu Declaration that the Serbs, Croats, and Slovenes were one "tri-named" people and that the Karađorđević dynasty would reign in the new unified state organised as a parliamentary, constitutional monarchy. The document did not say if the state would be federal or centralised. Trumbić proposed to establish a provisional government of the new state. Pašić declined, however, to avoid undermining the diplomatic advantage enjoyed by Serbia in the unification process as a recognised state. Supilo died two months later.

=== State of Slovenes, Croats and Serbs ===
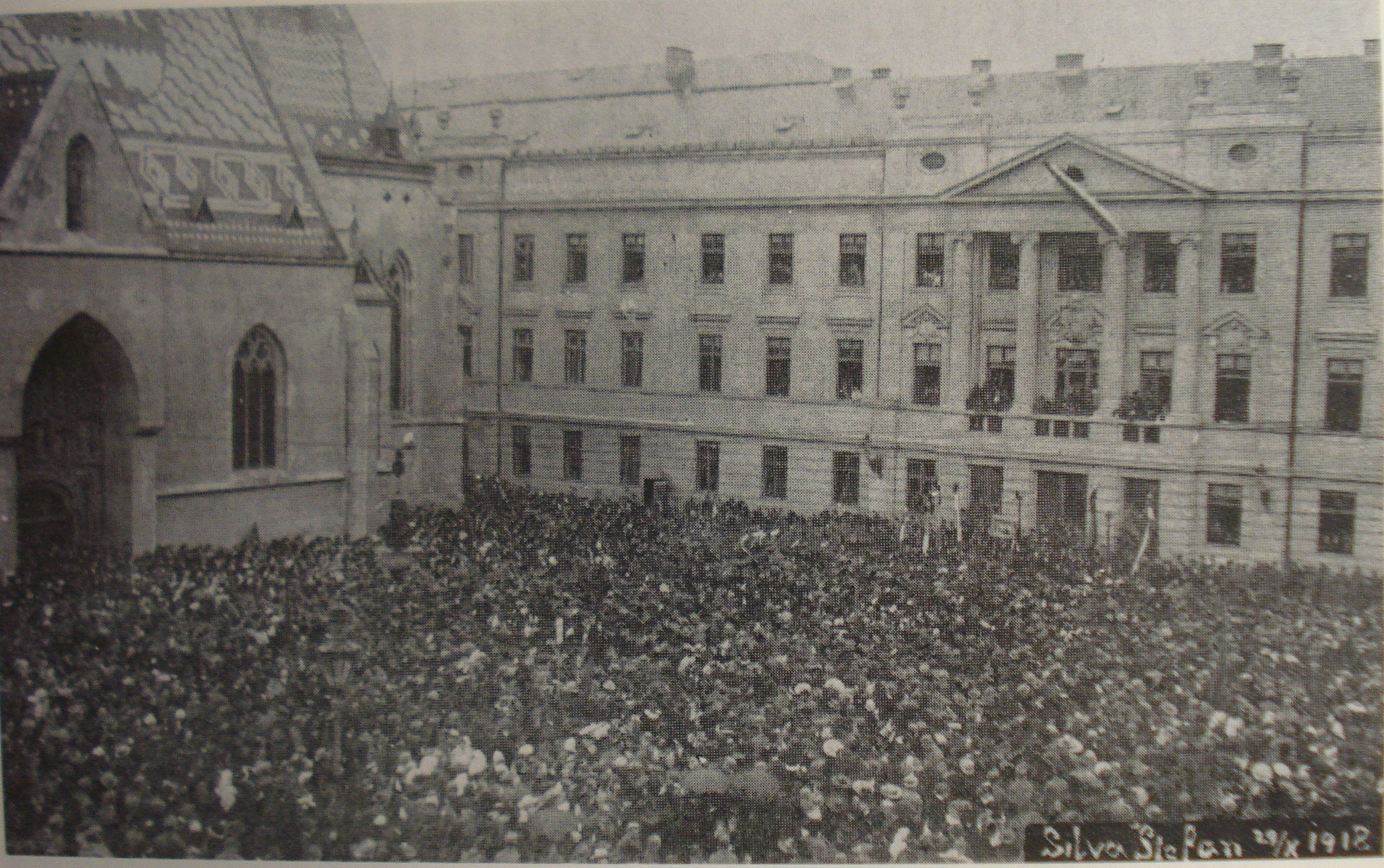
Proclamation of the State of Slovenes, Croats and Serbs in front of the Sabor in Zagreb.

On 5–6 October 1918, representatives of Slovene, Croat, and Serb political parties in Austria-Hungary established the National Council of Slovenes, Croats and Serbs to work towards independence from the empire. The same month, Emperor Charles I of Austria offered to reorganise Austria-Hungary as a federation, but his proposal was rejected as belated. On 18 October, the National Council declared itself the central organ of the new State of Slovenes, Croats and Serbs. The Croatian Sabor ('Parliament') was convened to sever ties with Austria-Hungary formally and establish the new state on 29 October. It elected the leader of the Slovene People's Party (SLS), Anton Korošec, as the president of the state. The president of one of SP's splinter parties, Ante Pavelić, and HSK co-founder and Croatian Serb Svetozar Pribićević were elected vice presidents.

Representatives of the National Council, the Serbian government and opposition, and the Yugoslav Committee met in Geneva on 6–9 November to discuss unification. The National Council and the Yugoslav Committee asked Pašić to renounce centralist government in the future state. Pressured by France and no longer enjoying the support of Russia, Pašić complied and signed the Geneva Declaration. In response, Prince Regent Alexander of Serbia compelled him to resign. The new cabinet declined to honour the declaration, annulling Serbia's commitment to a federal state.

The National Council faced threats of revolutionary unrest and Italian invasion. Therefore, it invited the Serbian Second Army to preserve order. In mid-November, Italian troops entered Istria, captured Rijeka on 17 November and were stopped before Ljubljana by city defenders, including a battalion of Serbian prisoners of war. The National Council appealed unsuccessfully for international help. On 25 and 26 November, assemblies in Vojvodina and Montenegro voted to join Serbia. In the latter case, the Podgorica Assembly was convened as an ad hoc body to depose the Petrović-Njegoš dynasty in favour of the Karađorđevićs.

Pressed by the Italian threat, the National Council dispatched a delegation to Prince Alexander to arrange unification in a federation. The delegation ignored the instructions when it addressed the Prince Regent on 1 December. Prince Alexander accepted the unification offer on behalf of Peter I of Serbia, and the Kingdom of Serbs, Croats and Slovenes was established. No ethnic or religious group had an absolute majority in the kingdom's population.

== Defining the South Slavic kingdom ==
=== Provisional government ===
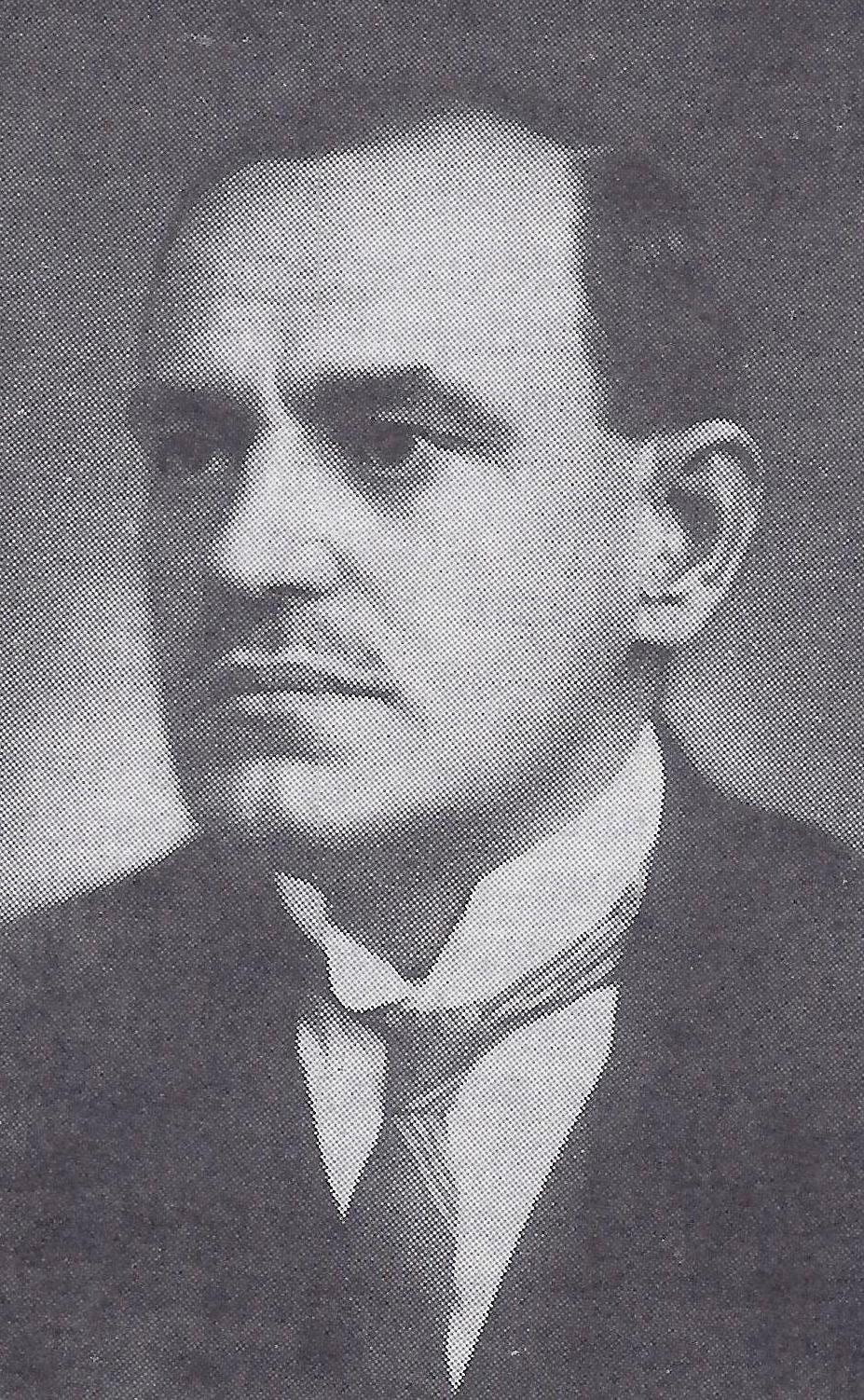
As the Interior Minister, Svetozar Pribićević centralised administration of the Kingdom of Serbs, Croats and Slovenes before adoption of constitution.

After unification, the Prince Regent appointed Stojan Protić as prime minister. Korošec was appointed his deputy, Momčilo Ninčić the finance minister, Trumbić the foreign minister, Pribićević the interior minister, and Ljubomir Davidović the education minister. Protić and Davidović were drawn from the largest Serbian parties – the People's Radical Party (NRS) and the Independent Radical Party, respectively. Soon afterwards, the Independent Radical Party went through a series of mergers to form the Democratic Party (DS). While the Prince Regent promised in the 1 December declaration that the Temporary National Representation would be appointed from a list of candidates approved with the agreement of the Serbian Assembly and the National Council, government minister Albert Kramer drew up the list instead.

While Pribićević wanted maximum centralisation, Protić advocated autonomous regions, as he saw the advantages of maintaining the administrative authority of the historical provinces. The NRS thought it necessary to preserve the Serb nation as the group having the dominant role in the unification but opposed federation. This led the NRS to insist on naming the country the Kingdom of Serbs, Croats and Slovenes, rejecting the name of Yugoslavia. The advocates of decentralisation preferred Yugoslavia. The debate on the constitutional system produced three proposed constitutions. A centralised state put forward by Pribićević, a federation proposed by Radić and a compromise from Protić.

Before the Constitutional Assembly was convened, and while the system of government was yet to be determined formally, the provisional government took measures to strengthen centralisation of the country. Pribićević moved to dismantle any pre-1918 administrative and representative bodies. In Croatia, the process contributed to increased tensions and disorder. The early centralisation processes were accompanied by government efforts in linguistic unification – by declaring the so-called Serbo-Croato-Slovenian or Yugoslavian language, also referred to as the state or national language, the sole official language. The Cyrillic script was made formally equal in use to the Latin script – the latter employed previously as the sole Croatian and Slovenian script. In practice, the bulk of official publications were made in the Ekavian Serbo-Croatian (also referred to as Yugoslav) language, largely printed only in Cyrillic script. Thus, Serbian became the de facto official language. Croatian and Slovenian were declared dialects of Serbian, relegating Croatian and Slovenian culture to a secondary status and echoing Pašić's views of South Slavic unity. In the military, use of Latin script was often regarded as reflecting anti-state sentiment and contributed to the decision by many non-Serbs to resign commissions – increasing Serb numerical domination among the officer corps. The Macedonian language was banned entirely. Even before the standardisation of school curricula, the doctrine of a "three-named people" was introduced into the education system.

=== Initial political opposition ===
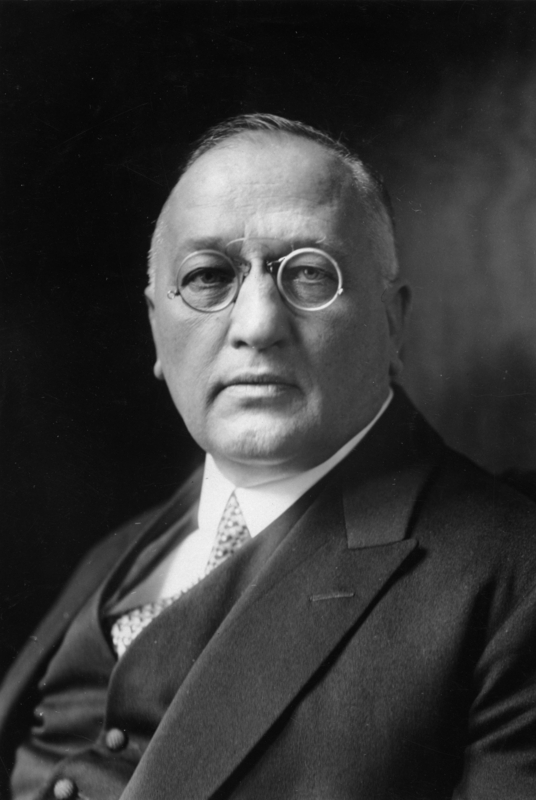
Anton Korošec, former president of the National Council of Slovenes, Croats and Serbs, led the Slovene People's Party.

Over time, the centralisation–decentralisation debate evolved from a contest of forms of Yugoslavism and turned primarily, but not exclusively, into a conflict between the Serbs and the Croats. Historian Ivo Banac pointed to the manner of the unification as the source of the country's ethnic conflicts and instability. Radić was a particularly vocal opponent of the monarchy while he and the HSS supported federal or confederal Yugoslavism, affording Croatia the maximum autonomy. In February, the HSS started a petition addressed to the Paris Peace Conference demanding a "neutral Croat peasant republic". Radić was imprisoned for a year in response. Even though the HSS was less influential than the NS and the SP in Croatia before the war, the imprisonment of Radić and other HSS members made them the champions of the Croatian national cause in public opinion and a de facto Croatian national movement.

While largely welcoming unification, Slovenes generally rejected integral Yugoslavism and worked to preserve their language and culture. Initially, the Korošec-led SLS advocated the federalist system of government and Slovenian autonomy. Slovenian Centralists were the most influential political opponents of the SLS in 1920, but their influence waned, leaving the SLS as the main representatives of the Slovenes in the interwar period, regardless of their support or opposition to the regime or Slovenian autonomy.

The Yugoslav Muslim Organization (JMO) represented the interests of the Muslim Slavic population of Bosnia and Herzegovina, while the Džemijet represented the Islamic population elsewhere in the state. The JMO supported Yugoslavism as a protection against assimilation by the Serbs and the Croats. While denouncing Yugoslav nationalism of the DS, the JMO allied itself with the NRS for its support of the preservation of Bosnian Muslim identity.

The Communist Party of Yugoslavia (KPJ) initially supported centralisation and unitarist positions. Soon after the establishment of the kingdom, the KPJ reversed its position under instructions from the Communist International and advocated the breakup of the country.

=== Early unrest and violence ===
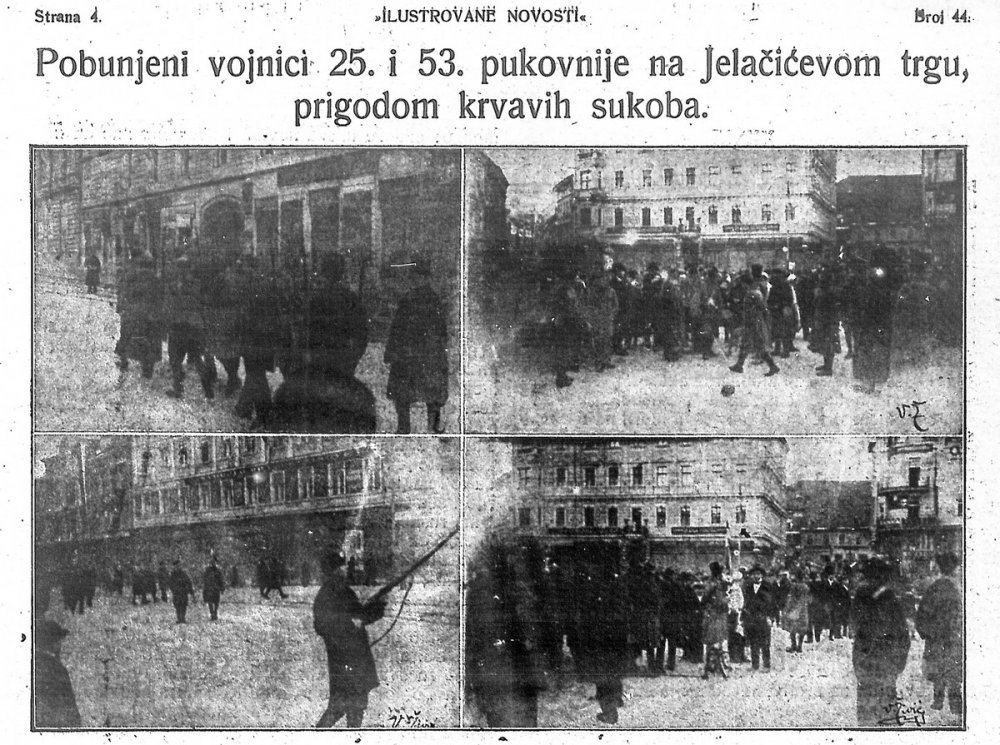
A protest against the monarchy held in Zagreb on 5 December 1918

The period immediately after the unification saw significant violence and civil unrest in the country. There were revolutionary actions in Slavonia and Vojvodina inspired by the Hungarian Soviet Republic. Macedonia and Kosovo – known as Southern Serbia then – saw a Serbianisation campaign and a colonisation programme. The Macedonian Bulgarians fought back through the Internal Macedonian Revolutionary Organization (VMRO), which had been re-established by Todor Alexandrov. He initially favoured the annexation of Macedonia to Bulgaria but later switched to the idea of an Independent Macedonia as a second Bulgarian state in the Balkans. In Kosovo, there were instances of retribution for killings by Albanians during the First World War Serbian Great Retreat. Acts of Albanian retaliation culminated in the failed 1919 uprising by the Committee for the National Defence of Kosovo and the massacre of Albanians by the regime forces. 50,000 police and troops were deployed to the region, supported by Chetnik paramilitaries led by Jovan Babunski.

In Bosnia and Herzegovina, Bosnian Serbs attacked Muslim landowners and peasants – killing about 2,000 and evicting 4,000 from their homes by 1920. Montenegrins killed several hundred Muslims in the Sandžak region in the same period. The desire to seize Muslim-owned land and compel the Muslim population to leave the country motivated the violence. In Montenegro, pro-independence Greens launched the unsuccessful Christmas Uprising against pro-Serbian Whites in 1919. In early December 1918, there was an anti-monarchy protest in Zagreb suppressed by force. The same winter, violence swept through the Croatian countryside – peasants looted large estates and shops, but there was also some inter-ethnic violence. After a lull, a peasant revolt broke out in Croatia in late March 1919 in response to a campaign of branding of draught animals for army use.

=== Vidovdan Constitution ===
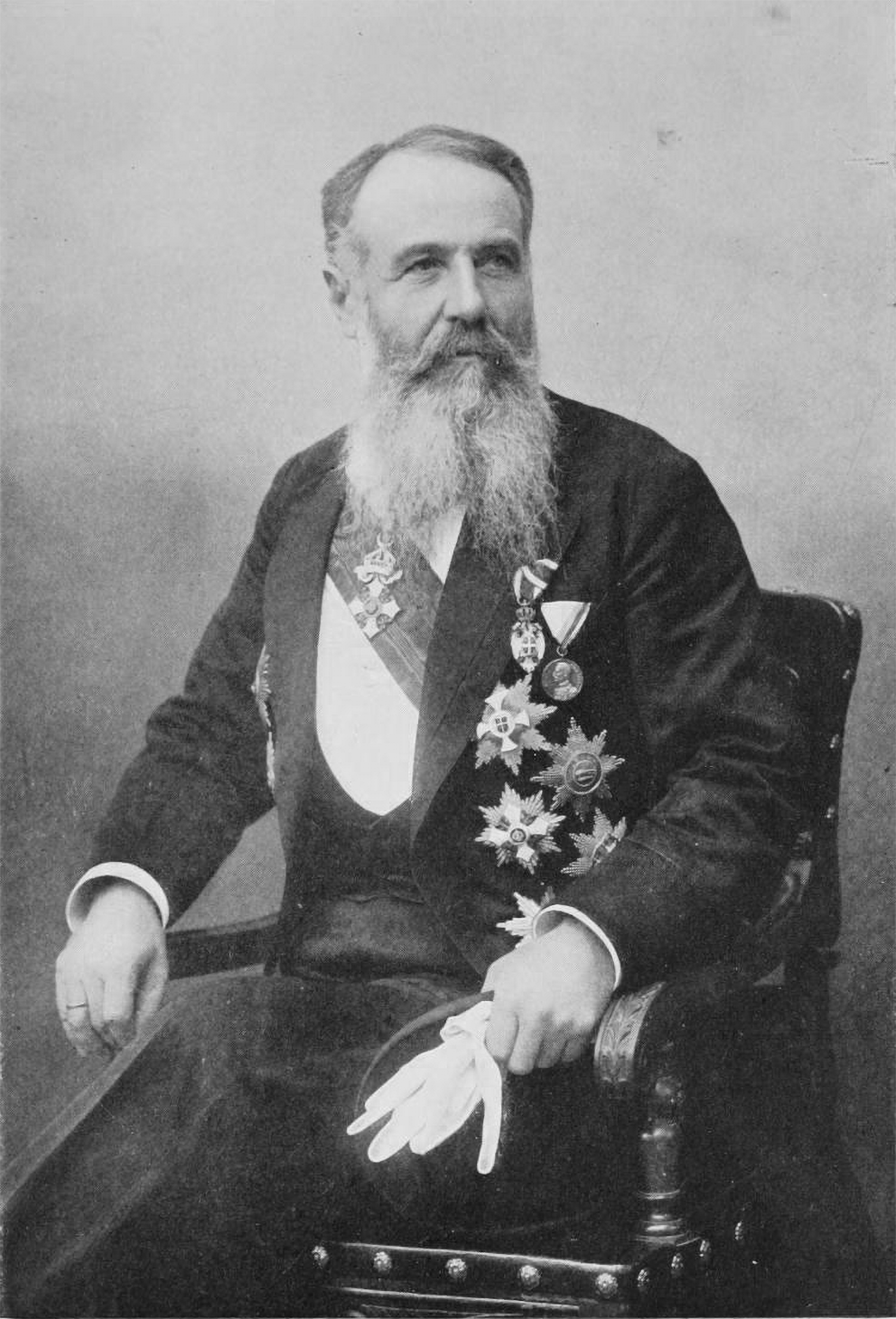
Prime Minister Nikola Pašić had the deciding role in selecting among different draft constitutions.

Following the 1920 election, the DS and the NRS became the largest parliamentary parties but did not have the majority in the Constitutional Assembly. The KPJ and the HSS – the third and the fourth largest parliamentary parties – refused to participate in the assembly over the rule that a simple majority would adopt the new constitution rather than by consensus as foreseen by the Corfu Declaration. A further dispute arose when the members of parliament were asked to swear an oath to the king. All parties except the DS and the NRS refused to do this.

The Constitutional Assembly adopted the Vidovdan Constitution based on the Pribićević draft on 28 June 1921. The choice was made at Prime Minister Pašić's urging as the version providing the least concessions to parties advocating decentralisation. Since the DS and the NRS did not have the votes to adopt the constitution, they obtained the support of the JMO and Džemijet in return for compensation to Muslim landowners for lost property.

Even though ideological divisions existed throughout the kingdom, politics quickly became largely ethnic-based. The parties in power portrayed any criticism of government as tantamount to treason. Regardless of the ethnic nature of the country's politics, there were political parties crossing that boundary at certain times – Serb parties opposing the regime or non-Serb ones supporting it. The constitution was a product of the Serb minority, but it confirmed Serb primacy, marking the start of a long political crisis. The integral Yugoslavism was firmly associated with the royal regime. In the 1920 election, the KPJ achieved considerable success in large cities in Montenegro and Macedonia through protest votes against the regime from unemployed urban voters and voters in regions having no other attractive national or regional opposition.

The Vidovdan Constitution was dysfunctional and ultimately failed because it was illegitimate and did not ensure the rule of law, individual rights, or neutrality of the state in the matters of religion and national culture. The national question was a product of the dysfunctional nature of the constitution. The fault lay primarily with the policies adopted by the king and Pašić as well as by Davidović and Pribićević in the first years of the kingdom. They viewed the Kingdom of Serbs, Croats and Slovenes essentially as an expansion of Serbia, and the conflicts were a response to the Serbian hegemonism and the constitution designed to serve only a particular interpretation of Serbian national interests.

== State ideology ==
=== Violence in service of ideology ===
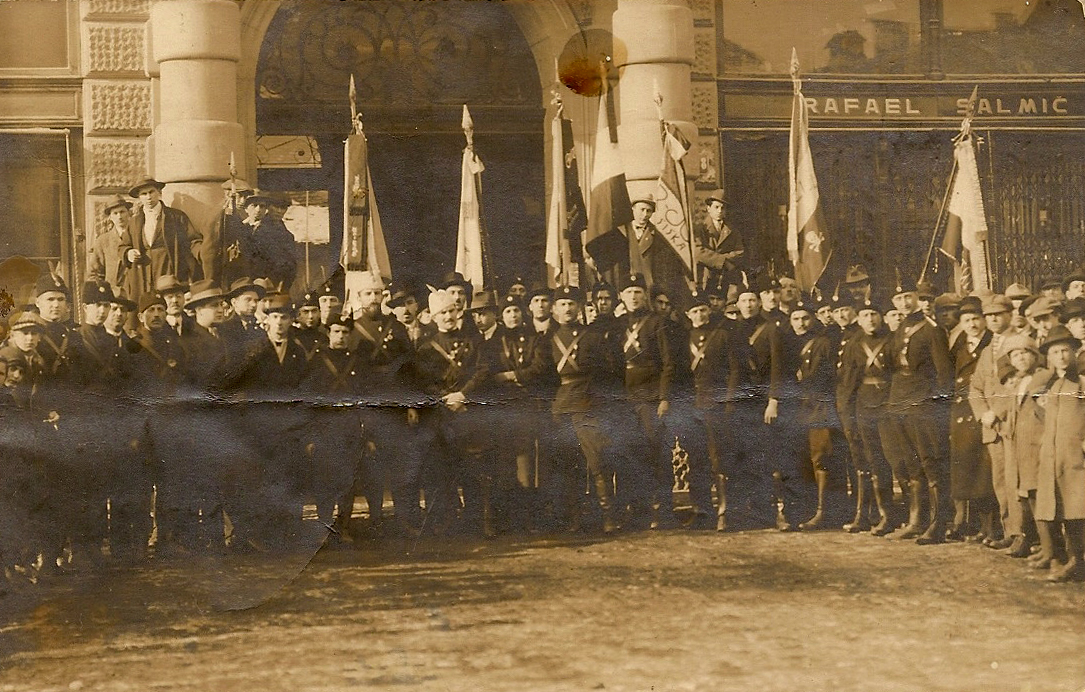
Photo of ORJUNA members in Celje.

Interior minister Milorad Drašković cancelled the KPJ victory in the 1920 Belgrade city election, prompting the communist terrorist group Crvena Pravda to assassinate him. In turn, this led to the outlawing of the KPJ and the enactment of legislation allowing the government to prosecute political opponents.

The regime organised paramilitary forces outside the legal framework. The royal administrator for Croatia established the Organization of Yugoslav Nationalists (ORJUNA) in Split in 1921. Funded through the provincial government, it operated under the protection of a DS faction loyal to Pribićević. Its purpose was to carry out extralegal actions against communists, Croatian separatists, and other real or perceived enemies of the state, including federalists, on behalf of the regime. By 1925, ORJUNA Action Groups had 10,000 members and were supplied with weapons by the White Hand organisation – a Black Hand splinter group with military ties. ORJUNA was an openly terrorist group advocating unitarism and a dictatorship of Yugoslav nationalists, potentially under royal patronage, and abolishing parliamentarism. It had similarities with the Italian Fascist Blackshirts, including the glorification of violence.

The Serbian National Youth (SRNAO) and the Croatian National Youth (HANAO) were formed in response. They employed similar methods of operation. The HANAO, established as a Croatian defence against the ORJUNA and initially backed by the HSS, became the main opponent of the ORJUNA. The NRS backed the SRNAO, who viewed the ORJUNA as being insufficiently Serbian. The officially sanctioned Chetnik organisation splintered in 1924 along the same ideological lines which separated the ORJUNA from the SRNAO. Until that point, the Chetnik movement was under the influence of DS, and the party was imposing Yugoslavist ideology. Following the NRS electoral victory over the DS in 1925, NRS's Puniša Račić became the dominant figure in the movement and went on to reverse its ideological course. That meant that Serbian identity, instead of the Yugoslav nation, was to assimilate other ethnic identities. Chetnik units pursued this aim by terrorising Croat and Muslim villages in Croatia and Bosnia.

=== Dysfunctional parliamentarism ===
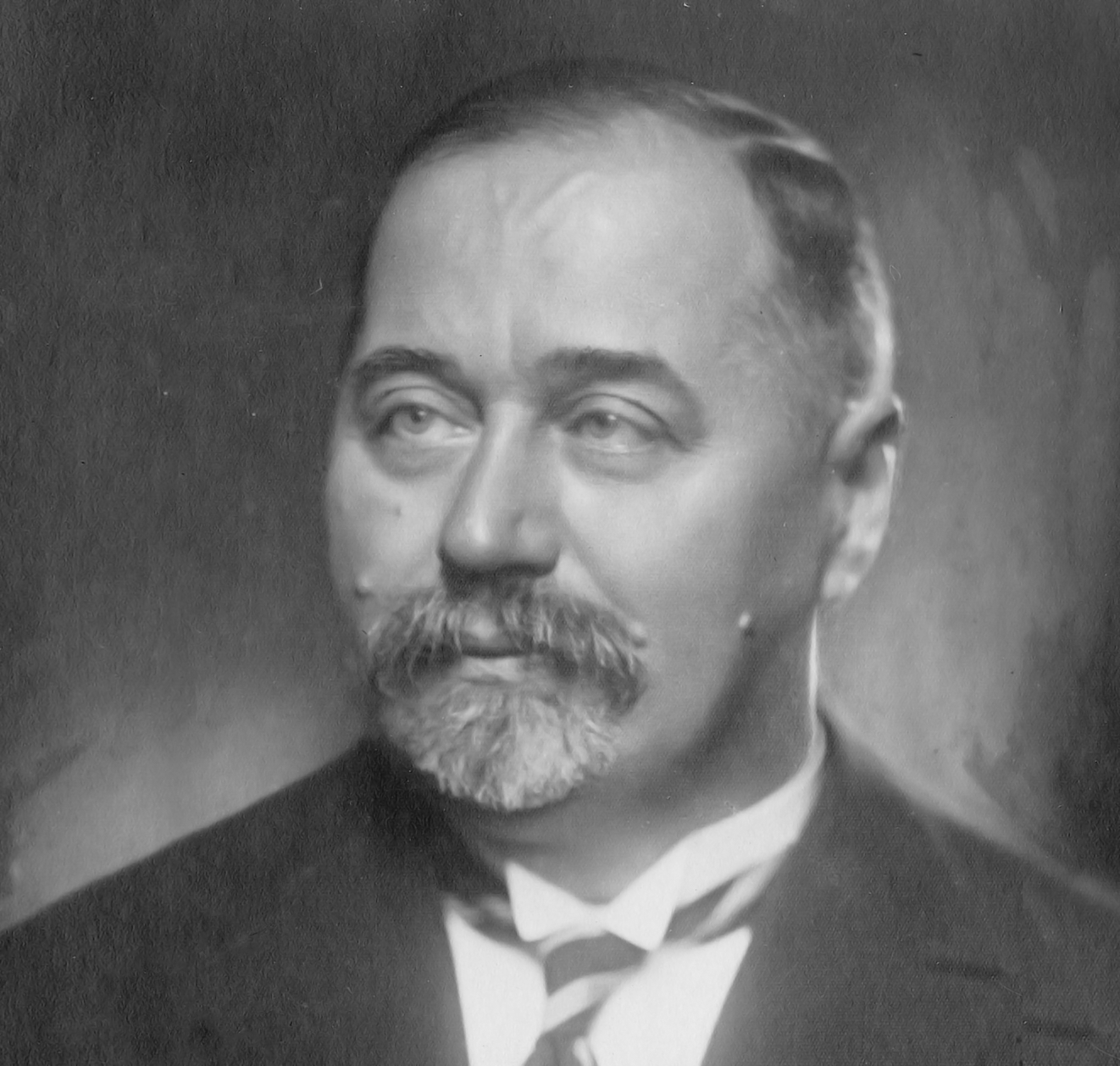
Stjepan Radić led the Croatian Peasant Party as one of the most vocal political opponents of the regime.

The centralism–federalism conflict evolved in the 1920s. The HSS ended its parliamentary boycott in 1924, aiming to vote against the NRS government, but its deputies were denied the right to vote for 16 weeks on the pretext of the verification of their credentials. That year, the Davidović-led DS split, and Pribićević formed the Independent Democratic Party (SDS). Pribićević realised the regime used the Croatian Serbs – his primary constituents – to antagonise Croats, stirring up ethnic tensions only to abandon Croatian Serbs, leaving them vulnerable to retribution whenever profit could be extracted from compromise with Croats.

In late 1924, HSS campaigning was banned, and Radić was imprisoned on charges of communist anti-state activity after the HSS joined the Krestintern. Despite this, the HSS received more votes in the 1925 election than in 1923. The NRS and the HSS established a coalition government in 1925 as the HSS formally renounced republicanism and changed the party name to the Croatian Peasant Party, abandoning the demand for a federation, and limiting its aims to Croatian autonomy. Radić was released from prison on the day the government was formed. The coalition ended during the 1927 local election campaign when the police interfered with HSS campaigning in Bosnia and Herzegovina and in Vojvodina. NRS Interior Minister Božidar Maksimović confirmed the accusations, adding the NRS would prefer Croats in Vojvodina declared themselves as Bunjevci or Šokci.

Following the split with the DS, Pribićević rejected centralism but retained a belief in the National Oneness. Since Radić remained open to the idea of a common Yugoslav identity, this allowed SDS-HSS cooperation. Radić was ready to accept that Serbs and Croats were linguistically and ethnically one people mutually distinguished by their political cultures. In 1927, the SDS and the HSS established the Peasant-Democratic Coalition (SDK) ostensibly to fight a taxation system which placed a disproportionately higher tax burden on areas not included in the pre-1918 Kingdom of Serbia. Rearrangement of forces in the centralism–federalism struggle was completed by the establishment of the ruling DS–NRS–JMO coalition joined by the SLS, which abandoned demands for Slovenian autonomy.

=== Death of Stjepan Radić ===
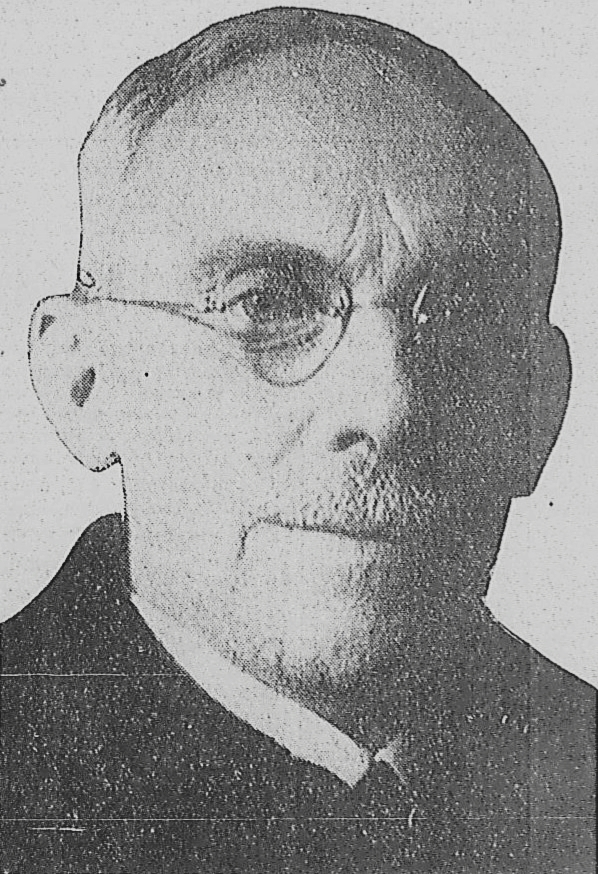
Vladko Maček succeeded the helm of the Croatian Peasant Party after Stjepan Radić's death.

In 1928, relations between the ruling coalition and the SDK deteriorated over accusations of unfair taxation and government corruption. Calls for violence against the SDK and specifically against Radić further inflamed the situation, resulting in shouting matches and physical altercations in the Assembly. On 20 June, after being accused of corruption in the Assembly, Račić took the floor, drew a revolver, and shot five HSS delegates – killing two and wounding three including himself. Račić turned himself in but was never tried. In the immediate aftermath of the shootings, 19,000 people gathered in the centre of Zagreb demanding secession from Serbia. In the ensuing violence, 3 more people were killed, 40 wounded, and 180 arrested. The government resigned; the king offered the mandate to several people who failed or declined to form a new government before turning to Korošec.

Radić died on 8 August. A large crowd attended his funeral, and there were numerous public displays of mourning in Croatia and in Bosnia and Herzegovina. Five days after his death, Vladko Maček was elected to lead the HSS. Unlike Radić, Maček dismissed the idea of a common Yugoslav nation. He claimed the ideology of National Oneness based on linguistic unity was insufficient to forge a single nation. In the immediate aftermath of the shooting, the king dismissed any possibility of federalism but offered Radić, Pribićević, and Maček "amputation" to remove Slovenia and Croatia from the country. They declined the offer for fear that it entailed transferring parts of Croatia to expanded Serbia. Instead, the SDK adopted a resolution breaking off relations with Serbia-based parties and declaring they no longer recognised the Kingdom of Serbs, Croats and Slovenes – returning to advocating a republic.

The Frankist faction of the Party of Rights saw the killings as an opportunity to tout opposition to Yugoslavism as the central issue among Croats. As the crisis coincided with the tenth anniversary of the establishment of the kingdom, Frankist leaders Ante Pavelić and Gustav Perčec portrayed Radić as the most recent in a long line of Croatian victims who suffered at the hand of Serbs in their All Saints' Day and 5 December decennial speeches. Pavelić exaggerated the significance of the Frankists at the time, but there was a shift in attitude towards Serbian primacy. While ten years of unity and liberty were celebrated in Serbia, the decennial was spoken of as ten bloody years in the former Habsburg lands of the South Slavic kingdom.

=== Royal dictatorship ===
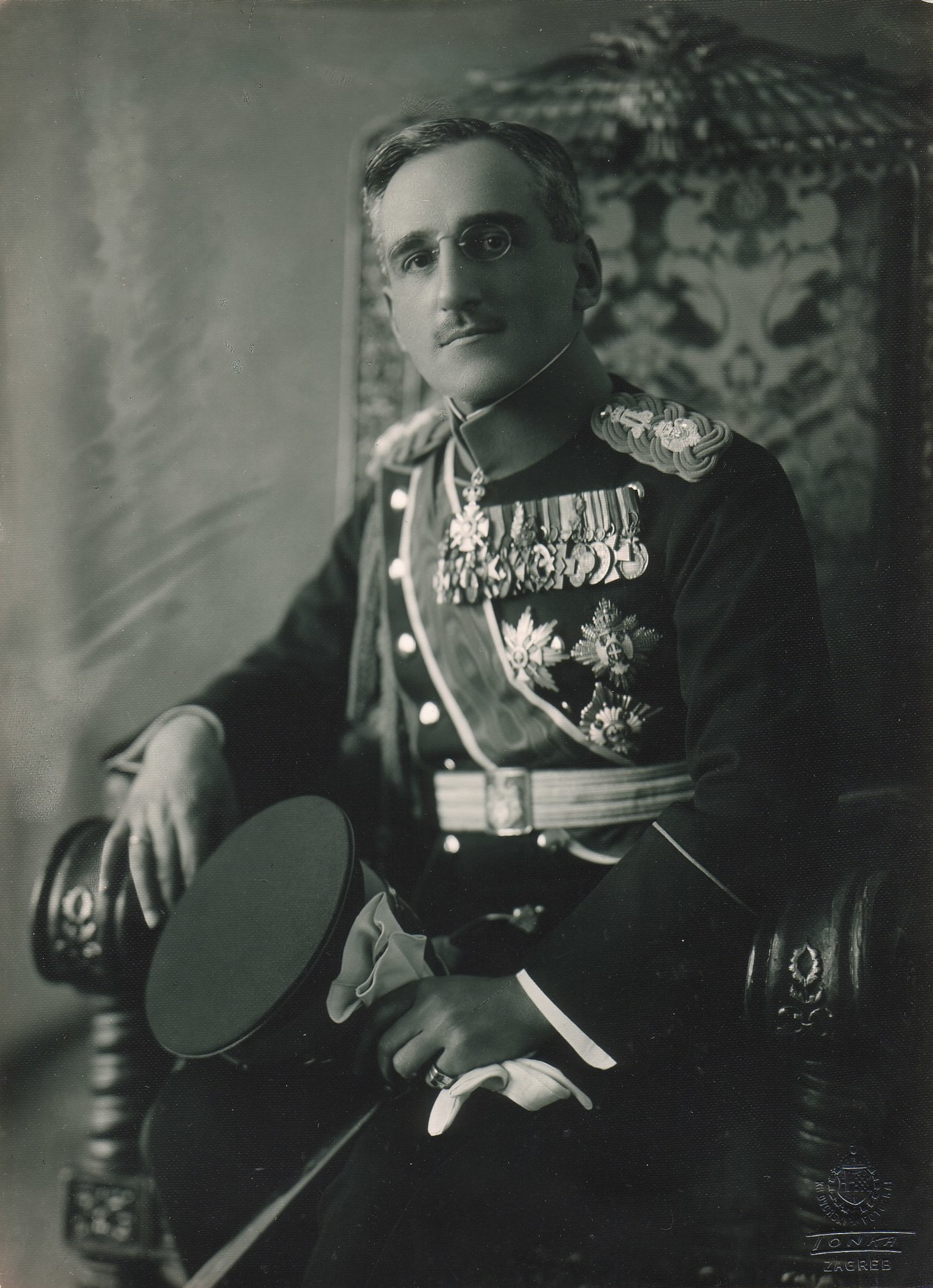
Alexander I of Yugoslavia introduced the Royal Dictatorship in 1929 and imposed the 1931 Constitution, enforcing integral Yugoslavism as the official state ideology.

The king proclaimed a royal dictatorship on 6 January 1929, and integral Yugoslavism became the official ideology of the regime. In October, the country was renamed the Kingdom of Yugoslavia to augment the National Oneness. "Tribal" symbols were prohibited, and the country was reorganised administratively to obliterate remnants of historical borders. All ethnically specific organisations, including non-political ones, were suppressed or discouraged, and "Yugoslav" counterparts were set up as replacements. The regime used the "blood and sacrifice" rhetoric as justification – referring to Serbian wartime losses – privileging Serbs and denigrating or excluding others. Even though Serbs and Montenegrins (deemed Serbs by the regime) constituted 39% of the population in 1932, it was government policy to recruit most staff of key ministries among Serbs. Employees of the justice, interior, and education ministries were 85%, 89%, and 96% Serb, respectively.

Strict censorship was introduced, and there were arrests of opposition leaders. Police became instrumental in imposing integral Yugoslavism, using terror groups – mostly composed of police personnel – for extralegal actions against dissidents. Pavelić and Perčec left the country days after the dictatorship was announced, and HSS vice president and secretary – August Košutić and Juraj Krnjević – left by August. The police kept politically active people under surveillance.

By spring, even the centralist DS held that an arrangement must be found with the HSS and the monarchy abolished, or at least significant autonomy given to parts of Yugoslavia. The regime was under increasing international criticism, especially after a police agent killed Frankist scholar Milan Šufflay in 1931. The event drew a protest from a group of intellectuals, including Heinrich Mann and Albert Einstein. Urged by the British, French, and Czechoslovak allies and possibly influenced by the toppling of Alfonso XIII of Spain, King Alexander negotiated with the NRS and the SLS to broaden his base of support – resulting in the Octroyed Constitution. It forbade most political activities and gave broad powers to the King and the executive. The Yugoslav Radical Peasants' Democracy (later renamed the Yugoslav National Party) (JNS) was established as the regime party to carry out the political programme effectively determined by the King. The JNS ran unopposed in the 1931 election, which was boycotted by the opposition.

In 1931, the exiled Pavelić established the fascist organisation, Ustaše, rejecting Yugoslavist traditions, sharing views with Hungarian revisionists and ideology with Italian Fascists. After a failed 1932 incursion in Lika, Ustaše focused on assassinations. A plot to kill the King in Zagreb in 1933 was uncovered, and the regime executed about one hundred people in retribution – even though most of them were unrelated to the plot or Ustaše. Working with the VMRO, Ustaše assassinated the King during his visit to France in 1934.

=== Abandoning integral Yugoslavism ===
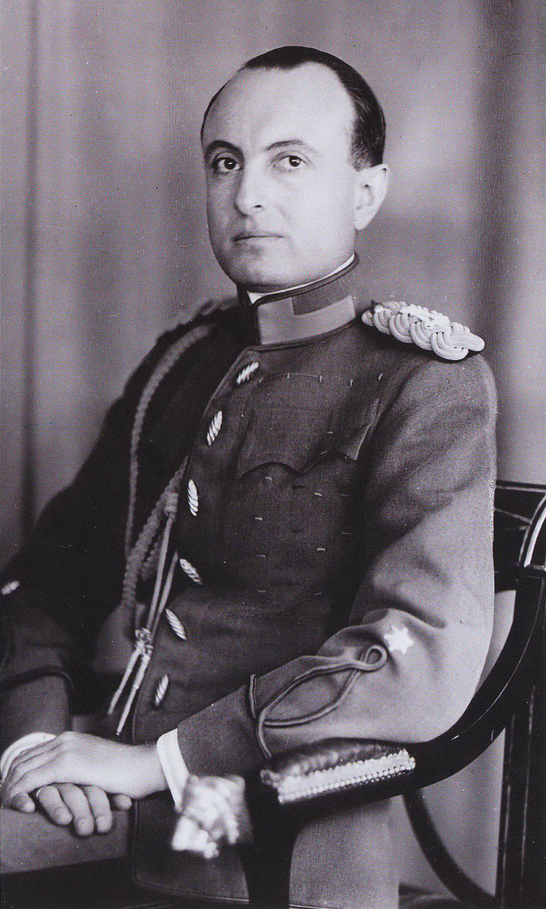
Prince Regent Paul (pictured) tasked the Prime Minister, Dragiša Cvetković, with resolving the Croatian question with Vladko Maček.

Before the end of 1934, Prince Paul, the head of the three-person regency, compelled the JNS government to resign. The united opposition contested the 1935 election, running against the JNS Prime Minister, Bogoljub Jevtić. The JNS list won, but the opposition threatened to boycott the Assembly because of electoral fraud determined by foreign observers. In response, Prince Paul replaced Jevtić with Milan Stojadinović. In one of his early speeches as prime minister, Stojadinović announced his intention to negotiate a settlement of what came to be called the Croatian question, but nothing specific was done in that respect until the 1938 election. The united opposition, led by Maček, won 45% of the votes, coming behind Stojadinović's Yugoslav Radical Union (JRZ). However, the opposition won 78% and 82% of votes in Littoral and Sava banovinas (roughly corresponding to Croatian lands), respectively.

Prince Paul gave the highest priority to the resolution of the Croatian question but knew that Maček would not negotiate with Stojadinović. Shortly after the election, minister Bogoljub Kujundžić gave a speech in the Assembly claiming Serbs were superior to Croats and Slovenes, prompting five ministers to resign. Prince Paul did not allow Stojadinović to nominate another cabinet – instead, he appointed Dragiša Cvetković as prime minister, tasking him with negotiating with Maček. HSS was negotiating simultaneously with Cvetković and Italy – receiving Italian promises of support if the HSS started an uprising – in return for territorial concessions and turning over the defence and foreign relations of Croatia to Italy. In talks with Cvetković, Maček asked for federal reorganisation of Yugoslavia, but the proposal was turned down. Instead, they agreed on a dualist formula modelled on Austria-Hungary, where the Banovina of Croatia would be established from the Sava and Primorje banovinas and other territories to be determined by a series of plebiscites. After Prince Paul vetoed the arrangement objecting to the plebiscites, Maček resumed contact with Italian Foreign Minister Galeazzo Ciano. Shortly thereafter, Cvetković and Maček restarted talks and came to an agreement on the borders of Banovina of Croatia. Prince Paul accepted the new arrangement, and the Cvetković–Maček Agreement was signed on 26 August 1939. After the agreement, the state no longer insisted on National Oneness and abandoned Yugoslavism as official ideology.

== Synthetic culture ==
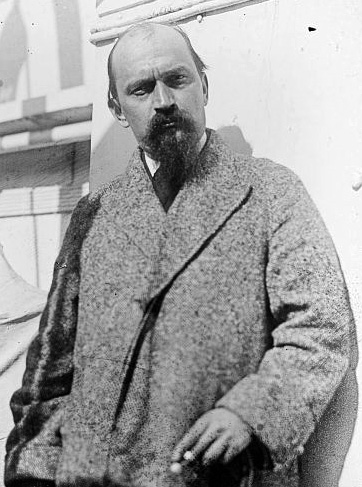
Ivan Meštrović was nicknamed the "Prophet of Yugoslavism" for his contribution to the 1911 International Exhibition of Art in Rome.

There was no unitary Yugoslav culture. The pre-First World War cultural Yugoslavism was confined largely to Croat writers and artists. The central model of cultural unification espoused by 19th-century Yugoslavist thinkers involved coalescing around Serbian culture, but this concept was mostly abandoned by 1900. In 1911, at the International Exhibition of Art in Rome, Croat and Serb artists from Austria-Hungary chose to exhibit in the Serbian pavilion to allow themselves greater presence than possible in a pavilion shared with the rest of the empire. Eighteen artists contributed 203 works of the total of 236 exhibited in the pavilion – nearly half of that number were Ivan Meštrović's sculptures. This established him as the "Prophet of Yugoslavism", even though his works, or contemporary works of other artists like Jozo Kljaković, did not particularly incorporate any South Slavic elements in their interpretation of national themes, but rather personal interpretations of Art Nouveau.

The aftermath of the First World War dampened the enthusiasm for unification of Yugoslav culture. Postwar writers and artists generally rejected such attempts. The most vocal critic of unitary culture was writer Antun Branko Šimić. Some, like Miroslav Krleža and August Cesarec, turned to radical socialism and criticised monarchist and bourgeoise Yugoslavia. Those, like Tin Ujević, who went through a phase of supporting the cultural unification joined this group in the critique. Finally, with few exceptions such as Ivo Andrić and Niko Bartulović, nearly all Croat writers and artists associated with pre-war Yugoslavism abandoned the ideology. As Yugoslavism in general and Yugoslavist synthetic culture in particular lost support in the interwar period, even Meštrović (and to a lesser degree Andrić) drew criticism. In Croatia, Meštrović's works portraying Serbian cultural figures were resented, while in Serbia, he was criticised because those same figures were not depicted wearing Serbian military hats and peasant shoes.

Meštrović planned, but never realised, construction of the Vidovdan Temple commemorating the 1389 Battle of Kosovo. He planned to dedicate the monument to Lazar of Serbia as the hero of the Kosovo Myth with the aim of transforming the figure of Serbian history into a Yugoslav hero. The Kosovo Myth and Vidovdan commemorations of the battle portray Lazar as the moral victor in the battle that cost him his life, and Meštrović interpreted the Kosovo Myth as symbolising sacrifice and moral victory of Yugoslavs. The myth was officially touted by the regime as a pan-Yugoslav national myth in the interwar period (and Vidovdan was a national holiday). Association of the myth with the integral Yugoslavism was particularly emphasised in the dictatorship era. It was compounded by the narrative of the Serbian World War I struggle and sacrifice – which was interpreted as implying the entitlement of the Serbs to lead Yugoslavia on account of suffering to liberate all the Yugoslavs.

== Religious centralisation and conflict ==
King Alexander also pursued unification in religious matters. He incorporated the Montenegrin Orthodox Church into the structure of the Serbian patriarchate in 1920. Ten years later, the King revoked the Habsburg-era statute allowing autonomous administration of Islamic religious affairs in Bosnia and Herzegovina. Furthermore, he ordered the seat of the Reis-ul-ulema moved from Sarajevo to Belgrade. When the sitting Reis-ul-ulema refused and resigned in protest, the King appointed a pro-regime politician, Ibrahim Maglajlić, to the post.

The Roman Catholic Church structures in the country refused to bend to the King's will. Instead, the regime sought to reduce its power in the country through disproportionately low subsidies, promotion of the Old Catholic Church as a rival, and downplaying the historical role of the Roman Catholic Church in school curricula while stressing the role of the Serbian Orthodox Church. The Serbian Orthodox Church accepted the role the regime gave it and publicly accused the Roman Catholics and the Roman Catholic Church of threatening Yugoslavia's sovereignty. Various forms of pressure were applied to Roman Catholics to convert to Orthodoxy and thousands did so. By the late 1930s, the Concordat was negotiated between the Holy See and Yugoslavia – only to be shelved by the regime after protests from the Serbian Orthodox Church. Following the protests, the Roman Catholic Church felt rejected by the regime and deemed Yugoslavia an agency of the hostile Serbian Orthodox Church.

== Socialist Yugoslavism ==
=== Federalism and conflict with Stalin ===
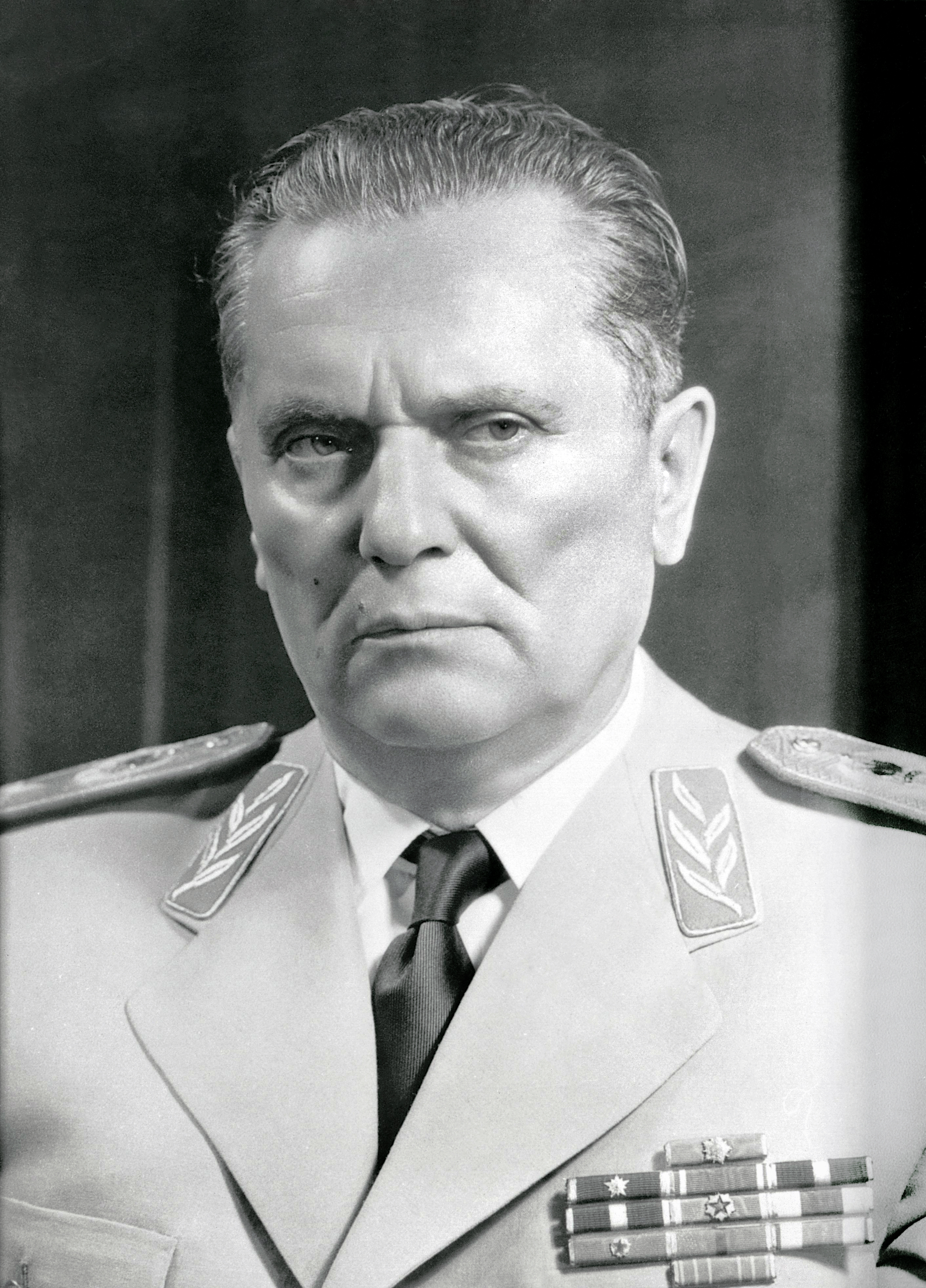
Josip Broz Tito was the leader of the Communist Party-ruled socialist Yugoslavia.

Following the Axis invasion of Yugoslavia in 1941, the KPJ launched armed resistance, which had spread by the end of 1941 to all areas of the country except Macedonia. Building on experience in clandestine operation, the KPJ organised the Yugoslav Partisans as resistance fighters led by Josip Broz Tito. In November 1942, the Partisans established a pan-Yugoslav assembly – the Anti-Fascist Council for the National Liberation of Yugoslavia (AVNOJ). It adopted the federalist approach to state building and acknowledged the failure of integral Yugoslavism. The Tito–Šubašić Agreements with the royal Yugoslav government-in-exile in 1944 and 1945 confirmed AVNOJ's decision. The Provisional Government of the Democratic Federal Yugoslavia with Tito as the prime minister replaced the government-in-exile. KPJ official policy was that a supranational Yugoslav working-class identity would replace national identities. Postwar socialist Yugoslavia was centralised, with a formal commitment to weak federalism. The 1946 Yugoslav Constitution was proclaimed by reading the document in Serbian, Croatian, Slovenian, and Macedonian languages – but it specified no official language.

Tito's foreign policy sought to integrate Albania into the Yugoslav federation, support the Greek communist guerrillas, and broaden ties with Bulgaria – potentially uniting the countries. The conclusion of the 1947 Bled Agreement with Bulgaria and the imminent deployment of the Yugoslav Army to Albania prompted a political confrontation with the Soviet Union. The clash culminated with the Tito–Stalin split in 1948. For political reasons, the rift was presented as an ideological rather than a geopolitical one. In response, the KPJ purged real and perceived Soviet supporters and regime opponents. Tito understood the Yugoslav government had to differ from the interwar centralism and Soviet-style socialism; therefore, the KPJ moved gradually away from party centralism, introducing self-management. This led to debates about the level of (de)centralisation and a power struggle which increasingly equated the struggle for centralism with unitarism and Serbian interests at the expense of other Yugoslav republics. The KPJ proclaimed a shift of its role from a ruler to a leader, decentralised its structure, and rebranded itself as the League of Communists of Yugoslavia (SKJ) at its sixth congress in 1952.

=== Rise of centralism ===
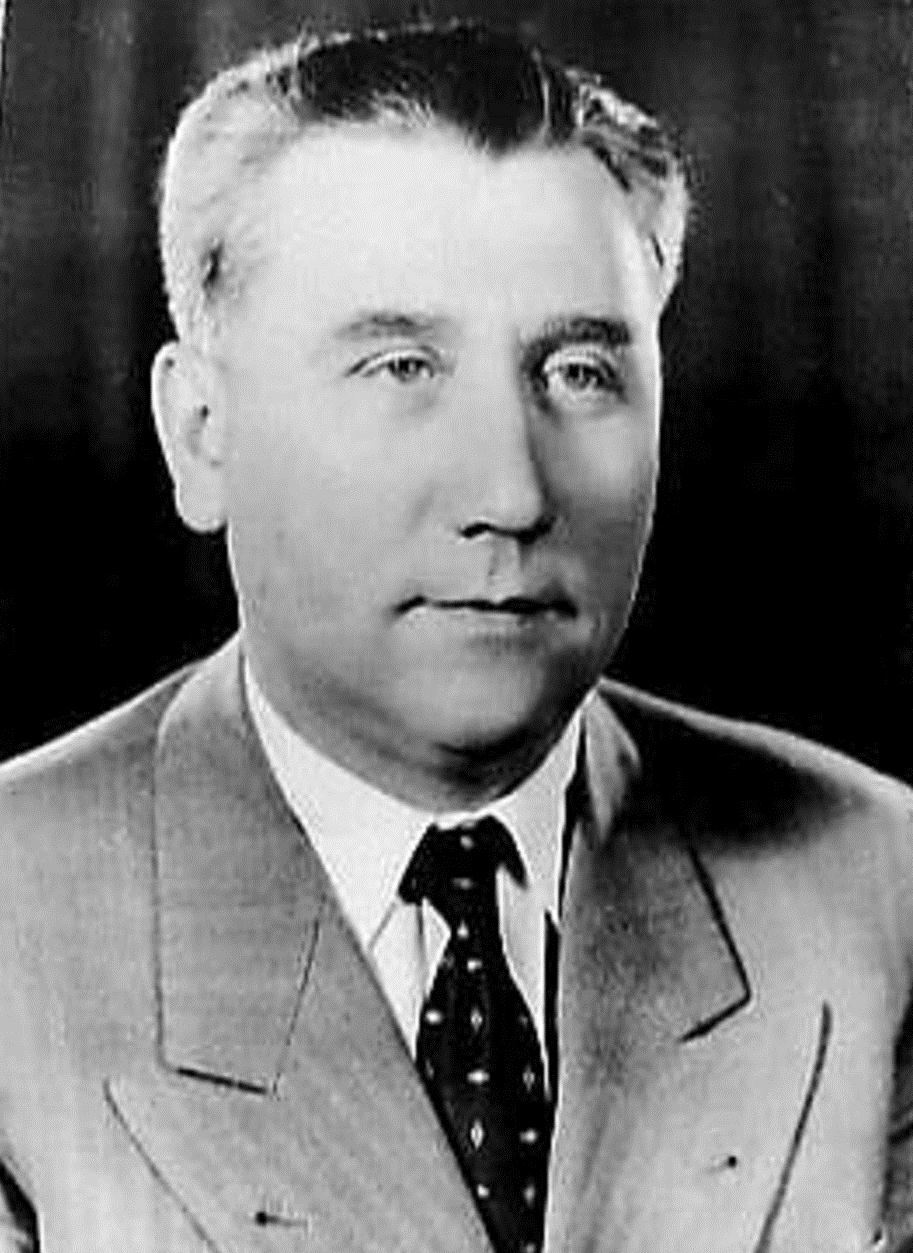
Vice President of Yugoslavia Aleksandar Ranković supported integral Yugoslavism until the 1960s.

In 1953, Tito was convinced Yugoslav nations would merge. When SKJ ideologue Milovan Đilas pointed out that King Alexander had thought the same, Tito insisted that socialism made the difference. Between 1957 and 1966, the political conflict developed with factions allied with the foreign minister, Edvard Kardelj (a Slovene), and the Yugoslav vice-president and Tito's likely successor, Aleksandar Ranković (a Serb). Ranković supported integral Yugoslavism, claiming that South Slavic unity stemmed from ethnic relatedness. Kardelj thought Yugoslav nations were bound primarily by the common interest of struggle against imperialism.

In 1958, the SKJ became more centralised by revoking many powers given to its republican branches. The party programme published at the 7th Congress praised emerging Yugoslav consciousness, and a series of articles was published advocating the creation of unified Yugoslav culture. This followed the introduction of the option of declaring one's ethnicity as Yugoslav in the 1953 census and the regime-sponsored 1954 Novi Sad Agreement between cultural organisations Matica srpska and Matica hrvatska on the single Serbo-Croatian language. The socialist Yugoslavism campaign sought to replace federalism with unitarism, but proponents of the socialist Yugoslavism stopped short of declaring an intention of nation-building.

The regime promoted the notions of "socialist Yugoslav consciousness" and "Yugoslav socialist patriotism" as the feeling or awareness and love of the socialist self-management community as concepts unrelated to nationalism and ethnicity. Yugoslav social patriotism was also claimed to support the values and traditions of ethnic groups living in Yugoslavia rather than aimed at creating a new Yugoslav nation. Tito endorsed the concept of "organic Yugoslavism" as a harmonious symbiosis of national specificities and affection for the Yugoslav federation as a community.

The intra-SKJ debate over the future of the federation took place by proxy: Dobrica Ćosić represented pro-centralisation views he attributed to leading Serbian communist Jovan Veselinov and Tito. Slovene communist writer Dušan Pirjevec, backed by Slovene communist leader Boris Kraigher, championed the opposing argument. Ćosić claimed the pursuit of republican interests leads to the disintegration of Yugoslavia and threatens Serbs outside Serbia; Pirjevec accused Ćosić of unitarism, and Serbs generally, of expansionism.

The Ćosić–Pirjevec debate mirrored interpretations of the Partisan-era "brotherhood and unity". The motto was used for wartime mobilisation largely in place of revolutionary slogans. After the war, the KPJ/SKJ used it to stress the party's role in establishing brotherhood and unity among nations of Yugoslavia, especially Serbs and Croats. However, it was generally interpreted by the Serbs as meaning the Yugoslav nations are true siblings, while Croats, Slovenes, and others largely interpreted the motto as implying the nations were friendly relatives living in unity.

=== Defeat of centralist forces ===
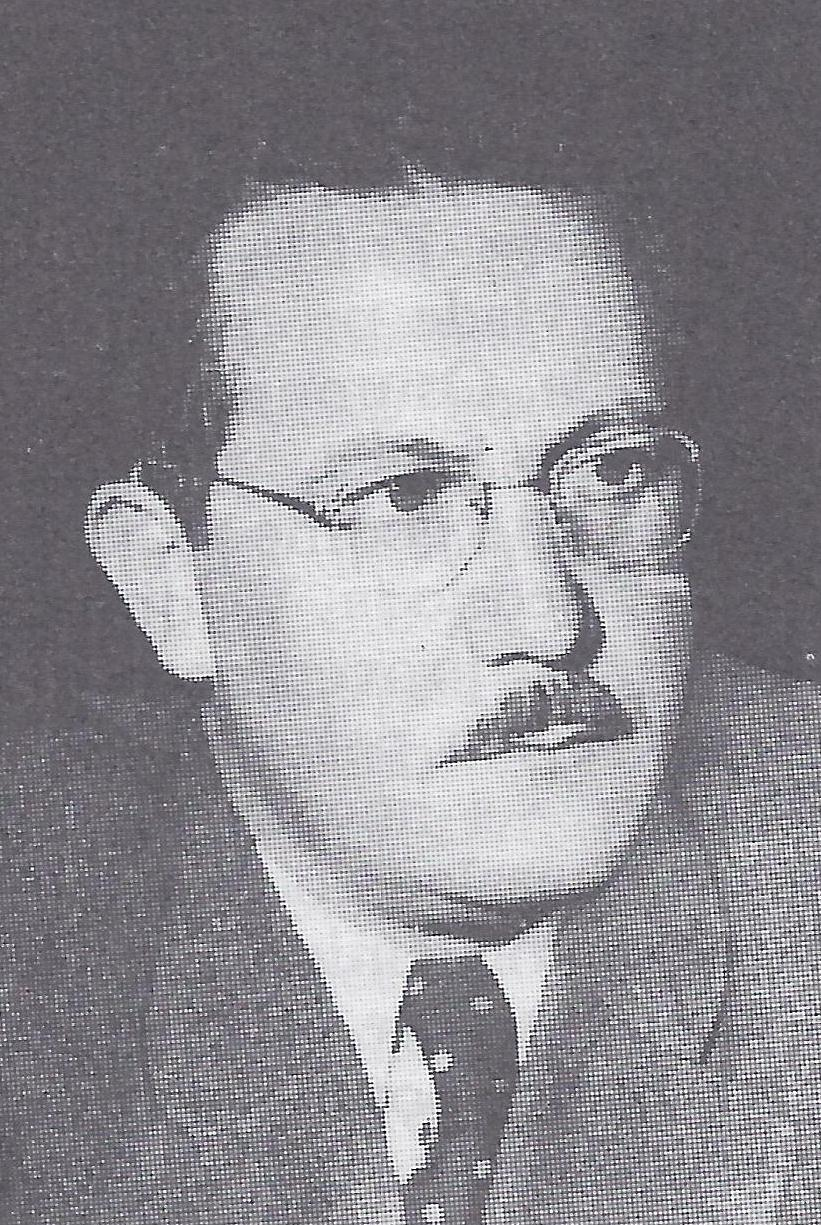
Edvard Kardelj persuaded Josip Broz Tito to remove Aleksandar Ranković from his political functions in 1966.

An exchange of letters published in the SKJ organ Borba publicly criticised the Yugoslavist campaign. Campaign proponents, largely ethnic Serbs, were accused of plotting to abolish the federation and resurrect Greater Serbian chauvinism. Most of the opposition came from SKJ branches in Croatia, Macedonia, Slovenia, and Vojvodina. In early 1963, Tito felt compelled to warn publicly about chauvinism and reassure non-Serbs that no merger of nations was intended, but he still defended Yugoslavism. In 1964, at the 8th Congress of the SKJ, Tito and Kardelj criticised proponents of the merger of the Yugoslav nations as advocates of bureaucratic centralisation, unitarism, and hegemony. Yugoslavism was not mentioned again at the Congress, and the SKJ transferred some of its powers to its republican branches. The SKJ regime abandoned Yugoslavism in favour of decentralisation. Siding with the Kardelj's ideas meant only Tito could defend Yugoslavism. All other supporters were dismissed by the SKJ leadership as unitarists.

In the spring of 1966, Kardelj persuaded Tito to remove Ranković from the SKJ central committee and the position of vice president of Yugoslavia. Ranković was accused of plotting to seize power, ignoring the decisions of the 8th Congress, and abusing the State Security Administration directly or through allies. He was accused of illegally wiretapping SKJ leadership, including Tito, removed from official posts, and expelled from the SKJ. By removing Ranković, Tito aimed at allowing greater decentralisation of Yugoslavia. The SKJ replaced Ranković in all his former posts with Serbs, but his ouster was generally perceived in Serbia as a Serbian defeat, resulting in resentment. Republican leaderships, including that of Serbia, supported Kardelj against Ranković because none of them could influence the federal government effectively on their own, especially with Tito in control. They saw the ouster as an opportunity to limit future federal power by eliminating the possibility of anyone inheriting Tito's authority.

=== Croatian Spring ===
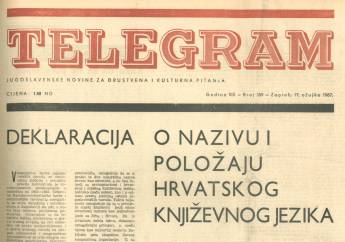
The Declaration on the Name and Status of the Croatian Literary Language was first published in the literary newspaper Telegram.

In 1967 and 1968, the Yugoslav constitution was amended, reducing federal authority in favour of the constituent republics. This was followed shortly by the appointment of new leadership of the Serbian SKJ branch, who favoured economic reforms and a policy of non-interference in other republics' affairs. At the 9th Congress of the SKJ in 1969, the Croatian and Macedonian branches pressured the SKJ to adopt the principle of unanimity in decision-making, obtaining a veto power for the republican branches. Further Croatian economic demands centred on contributing less tax to the federal budget and addressing under-representation of Croats in the police, security forces, and the military, as well as in political and economic institutions throughout Yugoslavia. By the end of the 1960s, the Croatian media and the authorities increasingly framed economic relations between Croatia and the federal government as an ethnic struggle. A genuine perception among Croatian nationalists of cultural and demographic threats to Croatian national sentiment, language, and Croatia's territory worsened the situation.

A major point of contention was the first two volumes of the Dictionary of Serbo-Croatian Literary and Vernacular Language based on the Novi Sad Agreement published in 1967. They sparked controversy about whether Croatian was a separate language. The dictionary excluded common Croatian expressions or treated them as local dialect, while Serbian variants were presented as the standard. The unrelated 1966 Serbo-Croatian dictionary published by Miloš Moskovljević inflamed the situation further by omitting the term "Croat" from the vocabulary. The Declaration on the Name and Status of the Croatian Literary Language issued by 130 Croatian linguists in response criticised the 1967 dictionary and called for formal recognition of Croatian as a separate and official language in Croatia. The declaration marked the beginning of the four-year-long period of increased Croatian nationalism commonly referred to as the Croatian Spring. Matica Srpska, the oldest Serbian language cultural-scientific institution, took the position that Croatian was only a dialect of Serbian, and Matica hrvatska, the non-governmental Croatian national institution, withdrew from the Novi Sad Agreement in 1970. It published a new Croatian dictionary and orthography, which was condemned by Serbia but endorsed by the Croatian branch of the SKJ.

In December 1971, Tito suppressed the Croatian Spring and compelled the Croatian leadership to resign. Purges targeting politicians, officials, media professionals, writers, filmmakers, and university staff continued until late 1972. In early 1972, reformists were removed or forced to resign in Slovenia, Macedonia, and Serbia. Nonetheless, the reformist achievements were preserved in the 1974 Constitution.

=== Breakup of Yugoslavia ===
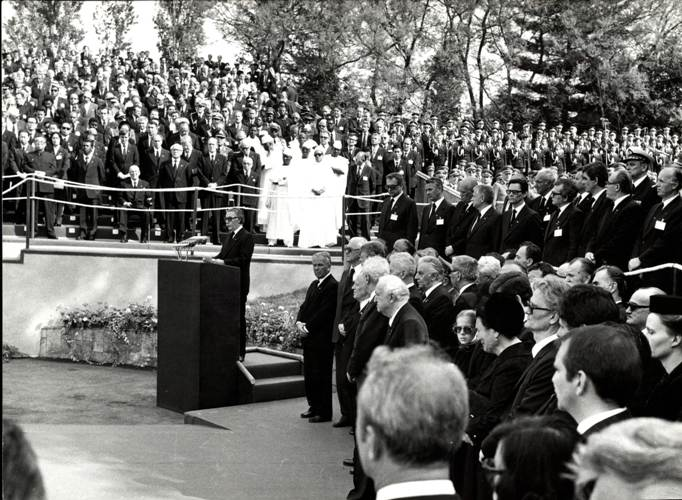
State funeral of Tito in 1980.

In Serbia Dobrica Ćosić joined other Serb political writers in writing the highly controversial Memorandum of the Serbian Academy of Sciences and Arts of 1986. The Memorandum claimed to promote solutions to restore Yugoslav unity, but it focused on fiercely condemning Titoist Yugoslavia of having economically subjugated Serbia to Croatia and Slovenia and accused ethnic Albanians of committing genocide against Serbs in Kosovo.

In Slovenia, editors of Slovene's Nova Revija, Niko Grafenauer and Dimitrij Rupel, published the Contributions to the Slovene National Program in 1987 as a special edition of the magazine. In a series of articles, anti-communist intellectuals argued for the independence of Slovenia and identified Yugoslavism as the main threat to Slovenian identity. Most of Slovenia's population backed this view. The Slovene centre-right DEMOS coalition, which won the 1990 Slovene parliamentary elections, supported those views. The Social Democratic Party of Croatia (reformed League of Communists of Croatia, formerly a branch of the SKJ) tried to mediate the conflict between Slovenia and Slobodan Milošević-led Serbia by formulating a compromise. In the weeks that separated the Slovene and Croatian parliamentary elections, this was seen in Croatia as a weakness and boosted the popularity of the nationalist Croatian Democratic Union (HDZ) led by Franjo Tuđman as a counterweight to displays of expansionist Serbian nationalism. HDZ advocated the end of Yugoslavism as "compulsory brotherhood" instead of dismantling Yugoslavia.

Lacking international support for independence, the Slovene and Croatian leaderships proposed a confederal reform of Yugoslavia, but diverging circumstances made Croatian–Slovene cooperation difficult. Slovenia had no large Slovenian populations in other parts of Yugoslavia and therefore no reason to negotiate with others. Milošević and his allies in the Yugoslav Presidency, chaired by Borisav Jović, had different approaches to the two republics. Slovenia, unlike Croatia, had no sizable Serb minority, and Jović supported its independence. At the same time, Croatia saw a Serb revolt (referred to as the Log Revolution) in areas predominantly populated by ethnic Serbs. Slovenia, Croatia, and Serbia negotiated over preserving Yugoslavia in 1990–1991. Slovenia and Croatia proposed a confederal system – only because it was politically difficult to be openly anti-Yugoslav. This resulted from pressure to preserve Yugoslavia in some form by the international community. The confederal reform proposal became increasingly unfeasible as Milošević was rejecting it. He favoured recentralisation of Yugoslavia and proposed to re-establish the political system in existence before the fall of Ranković in 1966. In 1988–1994, Serb intellectuals were unsuccessfully proposing the reintroduction of Yugoslavist ideas as state policies.

== See also ==
- Austro-Slavism
- Czechoslovakism
- Serbian–Montenegrin unionism
- Titoism
- Yugo-nostalgia
- Yugoslav studies

== Sources ==
- Banac, Ivo (1984). The National Question in Yugoslavia: Origins, History, Politics. Ithaca: Cornell University Press. ISBN 0-8014-1675-2.
- Banac, Ivo (1992). "Yugoslavia". The American Historical Review. 97 (4). Oxford: Oxford University Press on behalf of the American Historical Association: 1084–1104. doi:10.2307/2165494. ISSN 0002-8762. JSTOR 2165494.
- Batović, Ante (2017). The Croatian Spring: Nationalism, Repression and Foreign Policy Under Tito. London: I. B. Tauris. ISBN 978-1-78453-927-6.
- Biondich, Mark (2007). "The Historical Legacy: The Evolution of Interwar Yugoslav Politics, 1918–1941". In Cohen, Lenard J.; Dragović-Soso, Jasna (eds.). State Collapse in South-Eastern Europe: New Perspectives on Yugoslavia's Disintegration. West Lafayette: Purdue University Press. pp. 43–74. ISBN 978-1-55753-460-6.
- Bougarel, Xavier (2003). "Bosnian Muslims and the Yugoslav Idea". In Djokić, Dejan (ed.). Yugoslavism: Histories of a Failed Idea, 1918-1992. London: C. Hurst & Co. pp. 100–114. ISBN 1-85065-663-0.
- Calic, Marie-Janine (2019). A History of Yugoslavia. West Lafayette: Purdue University Press. ISBN 978-1-55753-838-3.
- Cipek, Tihomir (2003). "The Croats and Yugoslavism". In Djokić, Dejan (ed.). Yugoslavism: Histories of a Failed Idea, 1918-1992. London: C. Hurst & Co. pp. 71–83. ISBN 1-85065-663-0.
- Connor, Walker (1984). The National Question in Marxist-Leninist Theory and Strategy. Princeton: Princeton University Press. ISBN 0-691-07655-3.
- Crampton, R. J. (1997). Eastern Europe in the twentieth century and after. London: Routledge. ISBN 978-0-415-16422-1. OCLC 560417530.
- Djokić, Dejan (2003). "(Dis)integrating Yugoslavia: King Alexander and Interwar Yugoslavism". In Djokić, Dejan (ed.). Yugoslavism: Histories of a Failed Idea, 1918-1992. London: C. Hurst & Co. pp. 136–156. ISBN 1-85065-663-0.
- Dragović-Soso, Jasna (2007). "Why did Yugoslavia Disintegrate? An Overview of Contending Explanations". In Cohen, Lenard J.; Dragović-Soso, Jasna (eds.). State Collapse in South-Eastern Europe: New Perspectives on Yugoslavia's Disintegration. West Lafayette: Purdue University Press. pp. 1–42. ISBN 978-1-55753-460-6.
- Feldman, Andrea (2017). "Kállay's Dilema: On the Challenge of Creating a Manageable Identity in Bosnia and Herzegovina (1882–1903)". Review of Croatian History. 13 (1). Zagreb: Croatian Institute of History: 103–117. ISSN 1845-4380.
- Glenny, Misha (2012). The Balkans, 1804–2012: Nationalism, War and the Great Powers. Toronto: House of Anansi Press. ISBN 978-1-77089-273-6.
- Haug, Hilde Katrine (2012). Creating a Socialist Yugoslavia: Tito, Communist Leadership and the National Question. London: Bloomsbury Publishing. ISBN 978-0-85772-121-1.
- Helfant Budding, Audrey (2007). "Nation/People/Republic: Self-Determination in Socialist Yugoslavia". In Cohen, Lenard J.; Dragović-Soso, Jasna (eds.). State Collapse in South-Eastern Europe: New Perspectives on Yugoslavia's Disintegration. West Lafayette: Purdue University Press. pp. 91–130. ISBN 978-1-55753-460-6.
- Ignjatović, Aleksandar (2014). "Images of the Nation Foreseen: Ivan Meštrović's Vidovdan Temple and Primordial Yugoslavism". Slavic Review. 73 (4). Cambridge: Cambridge University Press: 828–858. doi:10.5612/slavicreview.73.4.828. ISSN 0037-6779. JSTOR 10.5612/slavicreview.73.4.828. S2CID 163714574.
- Irvine, Jill (2007). "The Croatian Spring and the Dissolution of Yugoslavia". In Cohen, Lenard J.; Dragović-Soso, Jasna (eds.). State Collapse in South-Eastern Europe: New Perspectives on Yugoslavia's Disintegration. West Lafayette: Purdue University Press. pp. 149–178. ISBN 978-1-55753-460-6.
- Jelavich, Charles; Jelavich, Barbara (2000). The Establishment of the Balkan National States, 1804-1920. Seattle: University of Washington Press. ISBN 0-295-96413-8.
- Jović, Dejan (2007). "The Slovenian-Croatian Confederal Proposal: A Tactical Move or an Ultimate Solution?". In Cohen, Lenard J.; Dragović-Soso, Jasna (eds.). State Collapse in South-Eastern Europe: New Perspectives on Yugoslavia's Disintegration. West Lafayette: Purdue University Press. pp. 249–280. ISBN 978-1-55753-460-6.
- Jović, Dejan (2003). "Yugoslavism and Yugoslav Communism: From Tito to Kardelj". In Djokić, Dejan (ed.). Yugoslavism: Histories of a Failed Idea, 1918-1992. London: C. Hurst & Co. pp. 157–181. ISBN 1-85065-663-0.
- Lampe, John R. (2000). Yugoslavia as History: Twice There Was a Country (2nd ed.). Cambridge: Cambridge University Press. ISBN 0-521-77357-1.
- Lukic, Renéo; Lynch, Allen (1996). Europe from the Balkans to the Urals: The Disintegration of Yugoslavia and the Soviet Union. Stockholm: Stockholm International Peace Research Institute. ISBN 9780198292005.
- Mićanović, Krešimir (2012). "Jezična politika s kraja 60-ih i s početka 70-ih: U procijepu između autonomije i centralizma" [Language Policy in Late 1960s and Early 1970s: Caught Between Autonomy and Centralism]. In Jakovina, Tvrtko (ed.). Hrvatsko proljeće 40 godina poslije [Croatian Spring 40 Years Later] (in Croatian). Zagreb: Centar za demokraciju i pravo Miko Tripalo. pp. 271–290. ISBN 978-953-56875-1-1.
- Miller, Nicholas J. (2007). "Return Engagement: Intellectuals and Nationalism in Tito's Yugoslavia". In Cohen, Lenard J.; Dragović-Soso, Jasna (eds.). State Collapse in South-Eastern Europe: New Perspectives on Yugoslavia's Disintegration. West Lafayette: Purdue University Press. pp. 179–202. ISBN 978-1-55753-460-6.
- Newman, John Paul (2013). "The Origins, Attributes, and Legacies of Paramilitary Violence in the Balkans". In Gerwarth, Robert (ed.). War in Peace: Paramilitary Violence in Europe After the Great War. Oxford: Oxford University Press. pp. 145–163. ISBN 9780199686056.
- Newman, John Paul (2015). Yugoslavia in the Shadow of War: Veterans and the Limits of State Building, 1903–1945. Cambridge: Cambridge University Press. ISBN 9781107070769.
- Nielsen, Christian Axboe (2009). "Policing Yugoslavism. Surveillance, Denunciations, and Ideology during King Aleksandar's Dictatorship, 1929-1934". East European Politics and Societies. 23 (1). Thousand Oaks: SAGE Publications Ltd: 34–62. doi:10.1177/0888325408326789. ISSN 0888-3254. S2CID 145765948.
- Pavković, Aleksandar (2003). "Yugoslavism's Last Stand: a Utopia of Serb Intellectuals". In Djokić, Dejan (ed.). Yugoslavism: Histories of a Failed Idea, 1918-1992. London: C. Hurst & Co. pp. 252–267. ISBN 1-85065-663-0.
- Nielsen, Christian Axboe (2014). Making Yugoslavs: Identity in King Aleksandar's Yugoslavia. University of Toronto Press. ISBN 978-1-4426-2750-5.
- Pavlowitch, Kosta St. (2003a). "The First World War and Unification of Yugoslavia". In Djokić, Dejan (ed.). Yugoslavism: Histories of a Failed Idea, 1918-1992. London: C. Hurst & Co. pp. 27–41. ISBN 1-85065-663-0.
- Pavlowitch, Stevan K. (2003b). "Serbia, Montenegro and Yugoslavia". In Djokić, Dejan (ed.). Yugoslavism: Histories of a Failed Idea, 1918-1992. London: C. Hurst & Co. pp. 57–70. ISBN 1-85065-663-0.
- Pavlowitch, Stevan K. (2007). "The Legacy of Two World Wars: A Historical Essay". In Cohen, Lenard J.; Dragović-Soso, Jasna (eds.). State Collapse in South-Eastern Europe: New Perspectives on Yugoslavia's Disintegration. West Lafayette: Purdue University Press. pp. 75–90. ISBN 978-1-55753-460-6.
- Perović, Jeronim (2007). "The Tito–Stalin split: a reassessment in light of new evidence". Journal of Cold War Studies. 9 (2). MIT Press: 32–63. doi:10.5167/uzh-62735. ISSN 1520-3972.
- Poulton, Hugh (2003). "Macedonians and Albanians as Yugoslavs". In Djokić, Dejan (ed.). Yugoslavism: Histories of a Failed Idea, 1918-1992. London: C. Hurst & Co. pp. 115–135. ISBN 1-85065-663-0.
- Ramet, Sabrina P. (1995). Social Currents in Eastern Europe: The Sources and Consequences of the Great Transformation. Durham, North Carolina: Duke University Press. ISBN 9780822315483.
- Ramet, Sabrina P. (2006). The Three Yugoslavias: State-building and Legitimation, 1918–2005. Bloomington: Indiana University Press. ISBN 9780253346568.
- Roberts, Walter R. (1973). Tito, Mihailović, and the Allies, 1941-1945. New Brunswick: Rutgers University Press. ISBN 978-0-8135-0740-8.
- Rusinow, Dennison (2003). "The Yugoslav Idea before Yugoslavia". In Djokić, Dejan (ed.). Yugoslavism: Histories of a Failed Idea, 1918-1992. London: C. Hurst & Co. pp. 11–26. ISBN 1-85065-663-0.
- Rusinow, Dennison (2007). "Reopening of the "National Question" in the 1960s". In Cohen, Lenard J.; Dragović-Soso, Jasna (eds.). State Collapse in South-Eastern Europe: New Perspectives on Yugoslavia's Disintegration. West Lafayette: Purdue University Press. pp. 131–148. ISBN 978-1-55753-460-6.
- Sovilj, Milan P. (2018). "About Yugoslavia on the Eve of Its Establishment: Nikola Pašić and British Prime Minister David Lloyd George About the Future Yugoslav State on 15th October 1918". Социолошки преглед. 52 (4). Belgrade: Serbian Sociological Society: 1335–1351. doi:10.5937/socpreg52-18428. ISSN 0085-6320.
- Štiks, Igor (2015). Nations and Citizens in Yugoslavia and the Post-Yugoslav States: One Hundred Years of Citizenship. London: Bloomsbury Publishing. ISBN 978-1-4742-2152-8.
- Tomasevich, Jozo (2001). War and Revolution in Yugoslavia, 1941–1945: Occupation and Collaboration. Stanford: Stanford University Press. ISBN 978-0-8047-0857-9.
- Troebst, Stefan (1999). "IMRO + 100 = FYROM? The Politics of Macedonian Historiography". In Pettifer, James (ed.). The New Macedonian Question. Basingstoke: Palgrave Macmillan. pp. 60–78. ISBN 9780333920664.
- Velikonja, Mitja (2003). "Slovenia's Yugoslav Century". In Djokić, Dejan (ed.). Yugoslavism: Histories of a Failed Idea, 1918-1992. London: C. Hurst & Co. pp. 84–99. ISBN 1-85065-663-0.
- Vukšić, Velimir (2003). Tito's Partisans 1941–45. Oxford: Osprey Publishing. ISBN 1-84176-675-5.
- Wachtel, Andrew (1998). Making a Nation, Breaking a Nation: Literature and Cultural Politics in Yugoslavia. Redwood City: Stanford University Press. ISBN 978-0-8047-3181-2.
- Wachtel, Andrew (2003). "Ivan Meštrović, Ivo Andrić and the Synthetic Yugoslav Culture of the Interwar Period". In Djokić, Dejan (ed.). Yugoslavism: Histories of a Failed Idea, 1918-1992. London: C. Hurst & Co. pp. 238–251. ISBN 1-85065-663-0.
- Wachtel, Andrew (2006). Remaining Relevant after Communism: The Role of the Writer in Eastern Europe. University of Chicago Press. ISBN 0-226-86766-8.
- Woodward, Susan L. (1995). Socialist Unemployment: The Political Economy of Yugoslavia, 1945-1990. Princeton: Princeton University Press. ISBN 0-691-08645-1.
