= Božidar Maksimović =

Serbian and Yugoslav lawyer and politician

- Божидар Максимовић
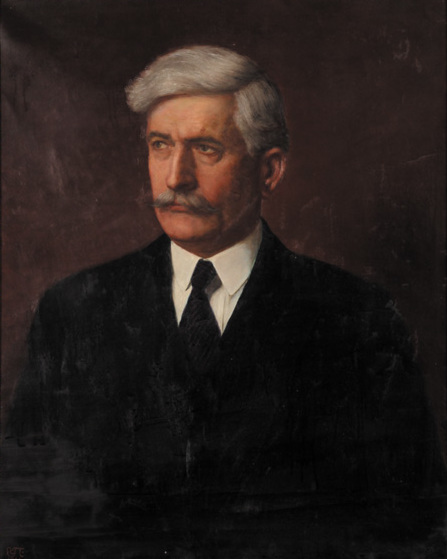
- Portrait of Božidar Maksimović by Uroš Predić, 1941

Minister of Education
- In office 26 August 1939 – 1940
- Prime Minister: Dragiša Cvetković
- Preceded by: Stevan Ćirić
- Succeeded by: Anton Korošec
- In office 6 January 1929 – 5 January 1932
- Prime Minister: Petar Živković
- Preceded by: Milan Grol
- Succeeded by: Dragutin S. Kojić

Minister of Justice
- In office 5 November 1932 – 11 November 1934
- Prime Minister: Milan Srškić; Nikola Uzunović
- Preceded by: Ilija Šumenković
- Succeeded by: Dragutin S. Kojić
- In office 5 January 1932 – 2 July 1932
- Prime Minister: Petar Živković; Vojislav Marinković
- Preceded by: Dragutin S. Kojić
- Succeeded by: Ilija Šumenković

Minister without portfolio
- In office 2 July 1932 – 5 November 1932
- Prime Minister: Milan Srškić

Minister of the Interior
- In office 6 November 1924 – 17 April 1927
- Prime Minister: Nikola Pašić; Nikola Uzunović
- Preceded by: Nastas Petrović
- Succeeded by: Velimir Vukićević

Personal details
- Born: 1 March 1886 Knić, Kingdom of Serbia
- Died: 18 July 1969 (aged 83) Belgrade, SFR Yugoslavia
- Party: People's Radical Party; Yugoslav National Party
- Education: University of Belgrade
- Occupation: Politician, lawyer

Božidar Maksimović (Serbian Cyrillic: Божидар Максимовић; 1 March 1886 – 18 July 1969) was a Serbian and Yugoslav lawyer and politician who performed various ministerial roles in the Government of the Kingdom of Yugoslavia, such as minister of the interior, minister without portfolio, minister of justice and minister of education.

Initially, he was a member of the People's Radical Party and later he joined the Yugoslav National Party.

Due to his "strong hand" policy, he was nicknamed "Boža Stock". He forcibly suppressed workers' strikes and student demonstrations. He was considered a court radical and brutally dealt with opponents of the monarchy and the centralist system of the state.
