= Cvetković–Maček Agreement =

Political compromise on internal divisions in the Kingdom of Yugoslavia

The Cvetković–Maček Agreement (Serbo-Croatian: Sporazum Cvetković-Maček, Споразум Цветковић-Мачек), also known simply as the Sporazum in English-language histories, was a political compromise on internal divisions in the Kingdom of Yugoslavia. It was settled on August 26, 1939, by Yugoslav prime minister Dragiša Cvetković (an ethnic Serb) and by Vladko Maček (a Croat politician). The agreement established the Banovina of Croatia, with boundaries drawn to include as many ethnic Croats as possible. This effectively created within unitary Yugoslavia an autonomous Croatian sub-state, a demand of Croat politicians since the 1918 founding of the Kingdom of Serbs, Croats and Slovenes (Yugoslavia). The Banovina later provided a model for eventual post-war constitutional arrangements in Federal Yugoslavia (1943–1945).

== Background ==
=== Administration in the 1920s & the Croatian Question ===
Yugoslavia effectively went through two iterations of internal administrative borders. In the Vidovdan Constitution of 28 June 1921, drawn up in large parts by Nikola Pašić and Svetozar Pribićević, 33 administrative districts were established in what was then called the Kingdom of Serbs, Croats and Slovenes. These were designed in a very deliberate way to maximize the political power and representation of the ethnic Serb population, and an amendment to the Electoral Law in June 1922 even prescribed the use of pre-First World War population numbers, allowing Serbia to ignore its massive casualties during the war. Furthermore, the way that the constitution was passed by parliament had also caused some resentment, as the Croatian Republican Peasant Party (HRSS), Croatia's largest regionalist party, had refused to vote, whereas the Communist Party of Yugoslavia (KPJ) had been excluded. This had made it easy for Pašić's People's Radical Party (NRS) and Pribićević's Democratic Party (DS), both political parties that were most popular among ethnic Serbs, to fulfill their agenda.

Ultimately, the Vidovdan Constitution institutionalized Serbian hegemony in the new state, and its revision became a key goal for high-ranking opposition voices like HRSS leader Stjepan Radić. Radić was shot by Serb deputy Puniša Račić in parliament in 1928, and died two months later. He became a martyr for the anti-Vidovdan cause, and the little remaining Croat faith in the constitution shattered. The HRSS started once again boycotting parliament, and the Vidovdan Constitution became untenable.

Starting as early as 1922, the issue of the value and preferred method of appeasement towards the unwilling Croatian partner became the local version of the Croatian Question among the Serbian elite. Even 'amputation', i.e. Croatian independence to the benefit of the whole system, was considered on multiple occasions. Usually, the Serbian vision of amputation included the annexation of regions that were ethnically mixed between Croats and Serbs by Serbia, rather than Croatia. This would have effectively created a "Great Serbia" rather than a union of South Slavs. From the Croatian viewpoint, the Croatian Question was less focussed on the appeasement of Yugoslavia as a greater whole, but on the separation of Croatia from any sort of influence from Belgrade. Stjepan Radić became the early face of the Croatian separatist movement. He oscillated between favoring outright independence or a confederate model of government with three constitutionally recognized peoples (Slovenes, Croats, Serbs) that were to form independent and sovereign nation states before then voluntarily joining a loose union. Other contradictions in his political beliefs included those on the role of organized religion, urbanization and communism. His view of Croatia's borders, be it within or without Yugoslavia, expanded far beyond the modern-day Croatian nation state and included most of contemporary Bosnia and Herzegovina as well. In Radić's view the local Bosniaks were not a separate ethnic group and were in truth an extension of the Croat nation, which had 'de-balkanized' them. Radić used the term 'Balkans' in a derogatory fashion, as he believed that Croatia was not a part of the Balkans. This Croatian view on Bosnia's status, which went back to thinkers like Ljudevit Gaj, was juxtaposed by Serbian nationalist beliefs going back to Vuk Karadžić, which included the Bosniaks as a natural part of the Serbian nation. As such, any sort of territorial settlement between Serbs and Croats would likely happen without representation of the Bosniaks and be to their detriment.

=== The Royal Dictatorship of the 1930s ===
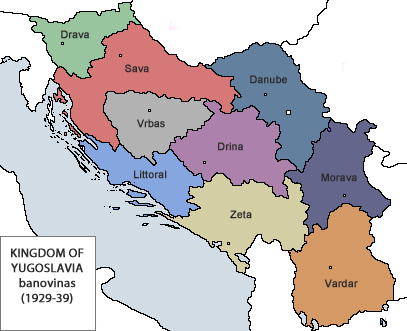
The nine initial Banovinas of Yugoslavia, established in 1929 and each named after a body of water and deliberately drawn to avoid historically, ethnically or regionally pre-established borders while effectively maintaining Serb ethnic dominance.

After the proclamation of the 6 January Dictatorship by Alexander I, the Vidovdan Constitution was overturned. Half a year later, it was replaced with the 1931 Yugoslav Constitution (also known as September Constitution), and the country officially became the Kingdom of Yugoslavia. In the September Constitution, the 33 administrative districts of the Vidovdan Constitution were replaced with nine banovinas. Each of these were named after a river, and in the case of the Littoral Banovina, after the coastline. They were outwardly designed to avoid connotations of historical, ethnic, regional or religious allegiance, but were in effect a continuation of the Serbian dominance within Yugoslavia: Serbs were the majority in six out of nine of the banovinas, Slovenes the majority in Drava, Croatians in Sava and Littoral. By comparison, the Kosovo Albanians and Macedonians were minorities under Serbian majorities in Zeta and Vardar, and the Bosniaks (often just called Muslims at the time) were split between four banovinas (Vrbas, Zeta, Drina, Littoral), making a majority in none of them.

In the decade following the establishment of the royal dictatorship, half a dozen prime ministers (Živković 1929–1932, Marinković 1932, Srškić 1932–1934, Uzunović 1934, Jevtić 1934–1935, Stojadinović 1935–1939) rose and fell, first at the behest of King Alexander I, and then, after the king's assassination in 1934, at the wishes of Prince Paul, who served as regent for the underage King Peter II. Of these prime ministers, Milan Stojadinović had the longest tenure between 1935 and 1939, primarily because of the global economic recovery from the Great Depression. However, he was ideologically a strong centralist and opposed to major concessions to the minority movements, particularly when it came to the Croatian Question. He also drew the personal ire of Prince Paul, a western-minded anglophile, by adopting imagery and rhetoric from Italian Fascism. Stojadinović's government fell in early February 1939, when he lost the faith of his cabinet. The regent replaced him with Dragiša Cvetković on 5 February. Cvetković would remain prime minister until the Yugoslav coup d'état in March 1941, immediately preceding the German Invasion of Yugoslavia. Cvetković was not particularly popular in his native Serbia, neither with government supporters nor with the opposition. As such, he sought to strike a deal with Vladko Maček, who had become the leader of the Croatian regionalist movement following Radić's death.

=== The Role of the Croats in Government, 1918–1939 ===
Stjepan Radić had initially boycotted the Yugoslav Assembly with his HRSS in the early 1920s and had been openly hostile to the institution of the Yugoslav monarchy and the very membership of Croatia within the Yugoslav state. He engaged in openly hostile rhetoric towards the Serbian elite, and had to go abroad in July 1923 after an arrest warrant because of a speech insulting to Queen Maria. Radić had even enlisted his party in the Krestintern in the Soviet Union in 1924, although King Alexander had openly supported the Russian Whites against the Bolsheviks in the Russian Civil War. Radić's open flirt with communism, which was deeply despised in the Serbian political establishment, even partially brought about the downfall of the Davidović administration, the first one which had not been led by the Radical Party. However, in the mid-1920s, he turned his ideology in prison, accepted both the monarchy and the constitution and started to work with his renamed Croatian Peasant Party (HSS, the 'Republican' part had been dropped from the name) from within the system. A brief alliance between Radić's HSS and Pašić's Radical Party, formed on 18 July 1925, led nowhere due to mutual and public contempt, and the HSS broke ranks with the Radicals in early April 1926.

After Radić's death in 1928, the party came under the leadership of Vladko Maček on 13 August 1928, who turned it further in favor of bourgeois political circles and intellectualism, away from the rural peasant agrarianism originally envisioned by Radić. He had been offered the possibility of leading the Yugoslav government as prime minister in July 1932, after the King had dismissed Petar Živković and Vojislav Marinković in short succession, but Maček declined. During the Royal Dictatorship, he formed potent political alliances in the opposition. First, the HSS joined with the Democratic Party to form a Democratic Peasant Union, then allied with other forces like the Slovene People's Party and Yugoslav Muslim Organization to become a complete 'United Opposition'. These alliances managed to score good electoral results in spite of the openly biased political system that the September Constitution of 1931 had established. The United Opposition list managed to secure 45% of the vote in December 1938, further undermining the authority of Prime Minister Stojadinović. Stojadinović was then replaced with Cvetković in February 1939.

== Agreement ==
=== Negotiations ===
Cvetković had been appointed prime minister because of the necessity that Regent Paul saw in immediately appeasing with the Croatian regionalists. Through intermediaries in the HSS, Cvetković met Maček in Zagreb for preliminary talks. Cvetković and Maček could profit off each other: Cvetković could gain some much need legitimacy with the Croat people and thus the United Opposition, whereas Maček could fulfill his regionalist agenda to increase Croatian autonomy. Negotiations lasted from April to August 1939, and produced the Sporazum. The agreement was finalized on 20 August 1939, and ratified on the 26th.

=== Terms ===
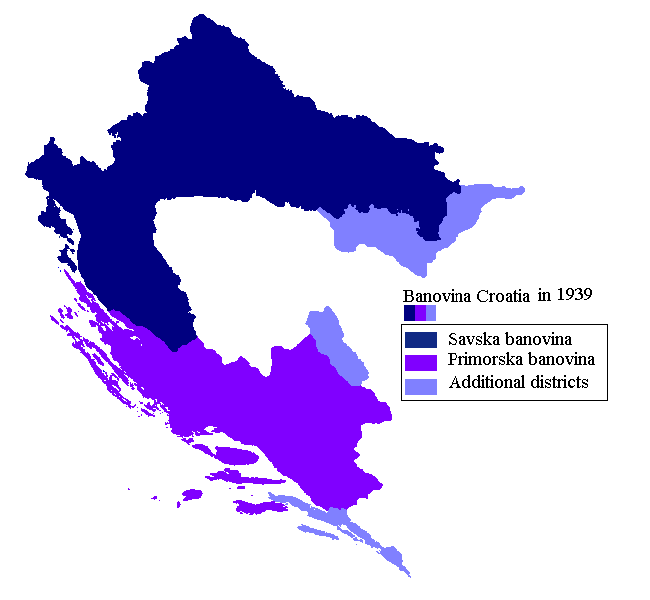
The Sava Banovina and Littoral Banovina were merged into the Banovina of Croatia.

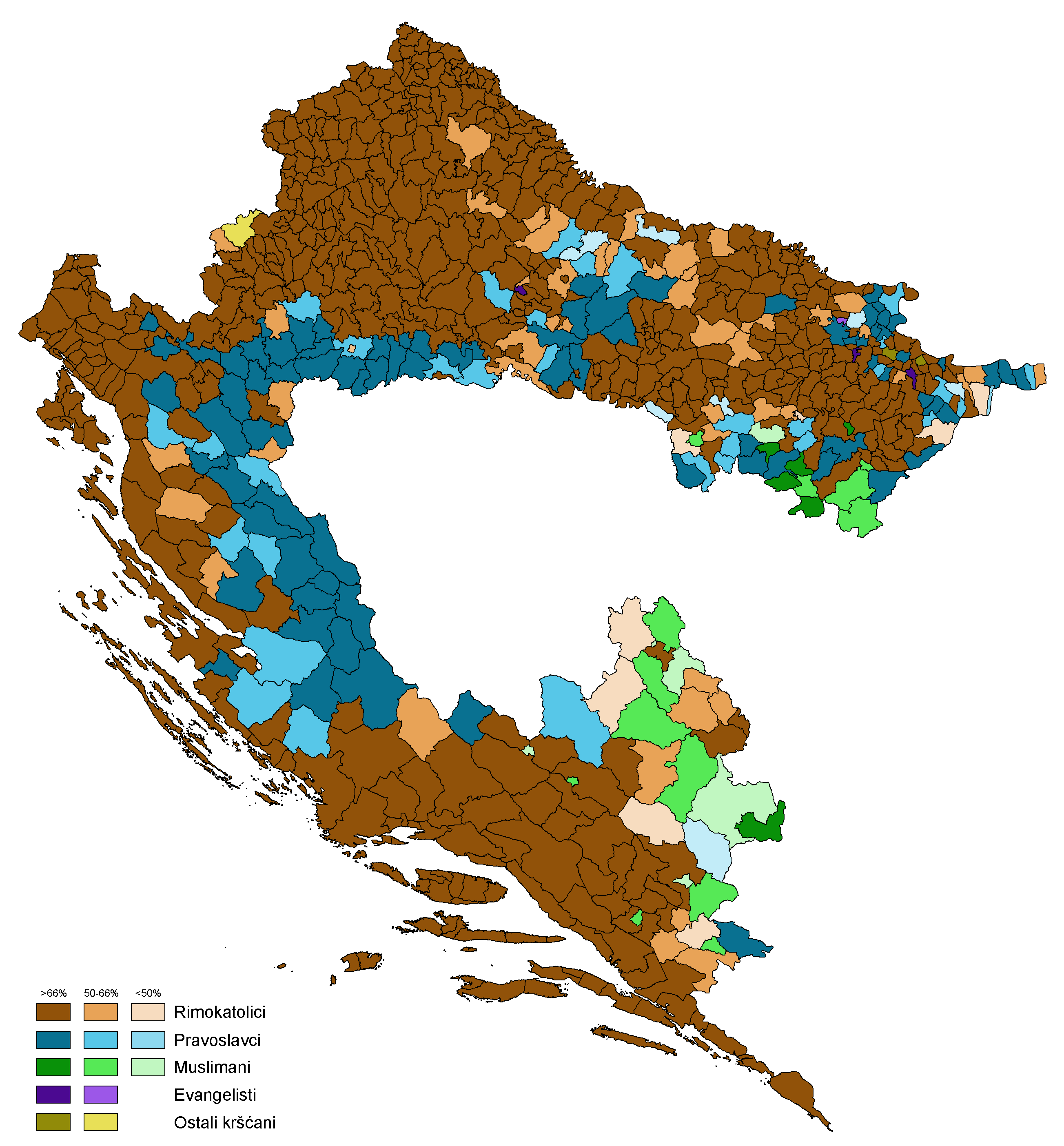
Religious map of the Banovina Croatia by municipality, according to the 1931 census.

The terms of the agreement were as follows: Политика ("Politics") (27 August 1939). sr:Споразум Цветковић—Мачек (1939) (in Serbian). p. 3 – via Wikisource.

- Article I
  - A new government for the Banovina of Croatia will be formed.
- Article II
  - The Sava and Littoral banovinas will become the Banovina of Croatia.
  - Additionally, the majority Croatian parts of the Dubrovnik, Sid, Ilok, Brcko, Gradacac, Travnik and Fojnica regions will be added to those two banovinas.
  - Parts of the aforementioned regions without Croatian majorities will be separated and will not be annexed by the Banovina of Croatia.
- Article III
  - Serbs, Croats and Slovenes are to be equal before the law in the new Banovina as well as in the country at large. The three ethnic groups are guaranteed equal access to positions in public service in the country.
  - Religious equality is guaranteed. The constitution of the new Banovina will guarantee equal basic civil and political rights.
- Article IV
  - The internal tasks of agriculture, trade and industry, forest and mines, buildings, social policy, public education, justice and internal administration will be transferred to the jurisdiction of the Banovina of Croatia. The Banovina will cooperate with the military leadership when it comes to mining concessions that are of interest to the national defense.
  - All other affairs, as well as 'matters of particular importance for the state', such as national security, suppression of destructive propaganda, police intelligence, protection of public order, and others, will remain with the federal government.
  - "Necessary financial autonomy" will be provided to Croatia, but the military leadership will be provided with the necessary influence in production and logistics within Croatia to assure national defense.
- Article V
  - Joint legislative power by King and Parliament within the jurisdiction of the Banovina.
  - Creation of a separate parliament for the Banovina, freely elected by a universal, equal, direct and secret ballot. Minority representation will be guaranteed.
  - The King shall exercise his administrative powers within the Banovina through a Ban.
  - The Ban, named and dismissed by the King, is accountable to the King and the parliament.
  - Written acts of royal authority must be counter-signed by the Ban if they are to apply within the Banovina of Croatia.
  - Establishment of a Constitutional Court for the settlement of disputes between the federal government and the Banovina.
- Article VI
  - The territorial extent and jurisdictional rights of the Banovina will be guaranteed by a special constitutional provision. This provision cannot be changed without the Banovina's consent.
- Article VII
  - The federal government agrees to make any new laws that might be necessary to implement the agreement.

Furthermore, although not formalized in the agreement, Maček joined the cabinet as Vice Premier. Four further cabinet positions were given to Maček's colleagues, forming the Government of National Agreement. The first and only Ban was Ivan Šubašić, a veteran of the First World War who was selected by the regent as a Serbs' Croat in the hopes of appeasing the Serbian public opinion about the deal with the Croatians, although the gesture had little effect on the negative Serbian reaction to the agreement.

=== Outcome ===
For the HSS part of the Peasant-Democrat Coalition, the agreement meant that, just like the HRSS had done with the Vidovdan Constitution, the party now effectively operated from within the September Constitution and had started cooperating with the constitutional system it had previously rejected. However, Maček had come as close as he could to complete Croatian autonomy without outright independence: Croatia now had a ban between itself and the king, and it had its own parliament in Zagreb, the Sabor, to look after its own affairs. Furthermore, he had scored five government posts for himself and his colleagues. However, the agreement's stipulations were provisional. The planned revisions did however never happen, as the Second World War brought about the end of the Kingdom of Yugoslavia.

The new Banovina of Croatia comprised about a third of the entire country's territory. The Croats were now the only ethnic group within Yugoslavia with their own dedicated political entity within the Kingdom of Yugoslavia, but the population also contained 20% Serbs and 4% Bosniaks.

Most of the stipulations of the treaty remained unfulfilled, as the outbreak of Second World War in the very week of the agreement's ratification and the eventual involvement of Yugoslavia after the German Invasion of April 1941 prevented its political realization.

=== Reaction ===
==== Croatia ====
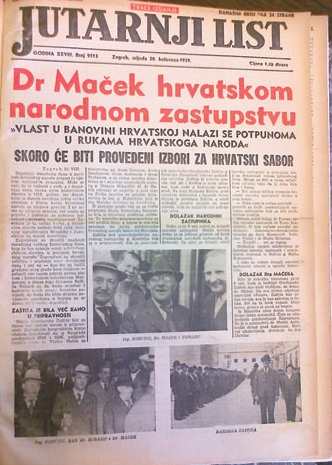
Croatian newspaper Jutarni List celebrating the agreement on 30 August 1939.

The Croatian reaction within Yugoslavia was, at least initially, generally positive, as the Croats, at last, had their own autonomous government and an ethnically defined territorial entity to call their own. However, both the fascist Ustasha and the Croatian communists were unhappy that the settlement had stayed short of outright independence. The positive opinion was further helped by the fact that the agreement was given legitimacy by its sponsors, especially Maček, who was popular as a defender of Croatian national interests. The positive opinion towards the agreement among Croats did however turn increasingly sour as the agreement's implementation stalled and economic hardship arose in relationship with the onset of the Second World War.

==== Serbia ====
The Serbian reaction was one of outrage: 800,000 ethnic Serbs, about 20% of the Banovina's population, were now subjects of a Croatian parliament, and the Croat Maček's accession to the office of vice premier was perceived as even more of an insult. Furthermore, the fact of the very existence of a Croatian banovina led to political calls for just the same arrangement for Serbia. Slobodan Jovanović of the Serbian Cultural Club put forth a proposal that would have included Bosnia, Montenegro and Macedonia into a banovina of Serb countries. This proposal reached planning stages in mid-1940, but was never realized due to the increasing pressure placed on the country by the Second World War. Both the Orthodox clergy and the officer class of the Yugoslav armed forces were outspoken in their opposition to the agreement. Even in liberal Serbian circles, where the 1931 Constitution was unpopular, the agreement was rejected. But among Serbian liberals, the main outrage did not lay with a Serbian government that betrayed the Serbs, but rather with the Croatian side of the deal, as the Croatians had through their cooperation with the authoritarian government legitimized both the authoritarian system in general and the 1931 Constitution in particular. Both liberals and conservatives in Serbia did, however, lay at least some of the blame at the feet of Prime Minister Cvetković, who was soon even less popular in Serbia than his authoritarian predecessor Stojadinović had been. In general, the agreement put a renewed strain on Serb-Croat relations, which had overall improved during the united opposition of Croat and Serb liberals against the central government's authority. The major effect of the Banovina of Croatia's creation on the political views of most Serb policy makers was the end of the ideology of centralism (also called unitarism). By the end of the 1930s, most Serbian politicians favored a federal system and wished to emulate the Croatian autonomy rights for the Serbs.

==== Rest of Yugoslavia ====
The Bosniak Muslims were particularly embittered, as they previously already had to deal with the division between four different banovinas, in all of which they were minorities. Now, two of these banovinas were merged into a national unit, which the Bosniaks had been denied, along with the very recognition as a national subculture in Yugoslavia, which was from its founding primarily designed around Serbs, Croats and Slovenes. Not only did parts of the Bosniak population (4% of the Banovina of Croatia's overall population) now live under Croatian rule, but the drafts for a Serb banovina by the likes of Jovanović and the Serbian Cultural Club threatened to undermine the cultural and political autonomy of the remaining Bosniaks as well. Only one member of the new Cvetković-Maček cabinet was a member of the Yugoslav Muslim Organization, further increasing the impression that the Croatians had struck a deal with the Serbians to partition Bosnia to the detriment of the Bosniaks.

For the Slovenes, the matter was less one of a possible imminent national destruction like in the case of Bosnia, but more one of equality between the three peoples. The Slovenes had usually stood side by side with the Croats in a joint skepticism of central Serb authority, but now the Croats evidently had struck a deal with the Serbs that awarded them special treatment, including a separate national parliament that Slovenia did not have. Although the Drava banovina was somewhat close to an exclusively Slovene district, it had none of the special autonomies granted to the Banovina of Croatia. While there were calls for a Banovina of Slovenia, the threat posed by neighboring Italy and Germany and the rapidly expanding Second World War soon took precedence.
