= Cabinet of Dragiša Cvetković I =

Government of Yugoslavia

First cabinet of Cvetković
- 29th Cabinet of Kingdom of Yugoslavia

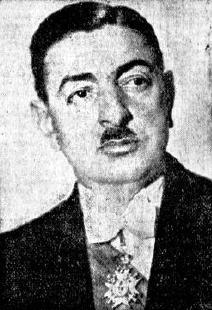
- Date formed: 5 February 1939
- Date dissolved: 26 August 1939

People and organisations
- Head of state: Peter II
- Head of government: Dragiša Cvetković
- No. of ministers: 19
- Ministers removed: 1
- Total no. of members: 20

History
- Predecessor: Stojadinović III
- Successor: Cvetković II

The First cabinet of Cvetković was the government of the Kingdom of Yugoslavia, from 5 February 1939 to 26 August 1939.

== Composition ==
Portfolio	Minister	Took office	Left office	Party
Prime Minister of Yugoslavia & Minister of the Interior	Dragiša Cvetković	5 February 1939	26 August 1939	JRZ
Minister of Foreign Affairs	Aleksandar Cincar-Marković	5 February 1939	26 August 1939	JRZ
Minister of Defence	Milutin Nedić	5 February 1939	26 August 1939	Independent
Minister of Justice	Viktor Ružić	5 February 1939	26 August 1939	JRZ
Minister of Education	Stevan Ciric	5 February 1939	26 August 1939	JRZ
Minister of Finance	Vojin Đuričić	5 February 1939	26 August 1939	JRZ
Minister of Construction	Miha Krek	5 February 1939	26 August 1939	SLS
Minister of Commerce and Industry	Jevrem Tomić	5 February 1939	26 August 1939	JRZ
Minister of Agriculture	Nikola Beslic	5 February 1939	26 August 1939	JRZ
Minister of Post, Telegraph and Telephone	Jovan Altiparmaković	5 February 1939	26 August 1939	JRZ
Minister of Forests and Mines	Ljubomir Pantić	5 February 1939	26 August 1939	JRZ
Minister of Transport	Mehmed Spaho †	5 February 1939	29 June 1939	JMO
Minister of Transport	Džafer Kulenović (act.)	29 June 1939	26 August 1939	JMO
Minister of Social Policy and Public Health	Miloje Rajković	5 February 1939	26 August 1939	JRZ
Minister of Physical Education of the People	Đuro Čejović	5 February 1939	26 August 1939	JRZ
Minister without Portfolio	Džafer Kulenović	5 February 1939	29 June 1939	JMO
Minister without Portfolio	Ante Mastrović	5 February 1939	26 August 1939	JRZ
Minister without Portfolio	Franc Snoj	5 February 1939	26 August 1939	SLS
Minister without Portfolio	Branko Miljuš	5 February 1939	26 August 1939	JRZ
Minister without Portfolio	Vojko Čvrkić	24 February 1939	26 August 1939	JRZ

== See also ==
- List of cabinets of Yugoslavia
