= 1931 Yugoslavian parliamentary election =

- 8 November 1931

All 305 seats in the National Assembly
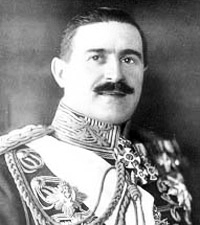
	First party
Leader	Petar Živković
Party	JRSD
Seats won	305
Popular vote	2,324,395
Percentage	100%
Prime Minister before election
Petar Živković
JRSD
Prime Minister after election
Petar Živković
JRSD

Parliamentary elections were held in Yugoslavia on 8 November 1931. Voters were presented with a single list of candidates supporting the royal dictatorship of King Alexander. The list was headed by Prime Minister Petar Živković.

== Background ==
Alexander abolished the Vidovdan Constitution, prorogued the National Assembly and introduced a personal dictatorship on 6 January 1929. The next day, General Petar Živković became prime minister, heading the regime's Yugoslav Radical Peasants' Democracy. A new constitution was promulgated in September 1931, under which the elections were held.

== Results ==
Party	Votes	%	Seats
Yugoslav Radical Peasants' Democracy	2,324,395	100.00	305
Total	2,324,395	100.00	305
Registered voters/turnout	3,560,278	–	
Source: Nohlen et al.
