= Ministry of Justice (Yugoslavia) =

Yugoslavian government ministry responsible for judicial system

- Serbo-Croatian: Ministarstvo pravde/Министарство правде Slovene: Ministrstvo za pravosodje Macedonian: Министерство за правда

Ministry overview
- Formed: 1 December 1918; 107 years ago
- Dissolved: 14 July 1992; 34 years ago
- Jurisdiction: Yugoslavia
- Headquarters: Belgrade
- Ministers responsible: Marko Đuričić, first Minister of Justice; Vlado Kambovski, last Minister of Justice
- Parent department: Federal Executive Council (1953–1992)

The Ministry of Justice was the justice ministry responsible for the judicial system of the Kingdom of Yugoslavia from 1918 to 1941 and later the Socialist Federal Republic of Yugoslavia from 1945 to 1992.

== List of ministers ==
=== Kingdom of Yugoslavia (1918–1941) ===
Minister	Image	Party	Term start	Term end	Lifespan
Marko Đuričić		People's Radical Party (NRS)	1 December 1918	20 December 1918	
Marko Trifković		People's Radical Party (NRS)	20 December 1918	16 August 1919	1864–1928
Kosta Timotijević		Democratic Party (DS)	16 August 1919	19 February 1920	
Momčilo Ninčić		People's Radical Party (NRS)	19 February 1920	31 March 1920	1876–1949
Dušan Peleš		People's Radical Party (NRS)	31 March 1920	16 May 1920	
Marko Trifković		People's Radical Party (NRS)	16 May 1920	1 January 1921	1864–1928
Marko Đuričić		People's Radical Party (NRS)	1 January 1921	24 December 1921	
Lazar Marković		People's Radical Party (NRS)	24 December 1921	1 May 1923	1882–1955
Ninko Perić		People's Radical Party (NRS)	1 May 1923	21 May 1924	1886–1961
Prvislav Grisogono		Independent Democratic Party (SDS)	21 May 1924	28 July 1924	1879–1969
Hamid Hrasnica		Yugoslav Muslim Organization (JMO)	28 July 1924	6 November 1924	
Edo Lukinić		Independent Democratic Party (SDS)	6 November 1924	29 April 1925	
Marko Đuričić		People's Radical Party (NRS)	29 April 1925	30 January 1927	
Milan Srškić		People's Radical Party (NRS)	1 February 1927	17 April 1927	1880–1937
Dušan Subotić		People's Radical Party (NRS)	17 April 1927	23 February 1928	
Milorad Vujičić		People's Radical Party (NRS)	23 February 1928	7 January 1929	
Milan Srškić		Yugoslav National Party (JNS)	7 January 1929	1 January 1931	1880–1937
Dimitrije Ljotić		Yugoslav National Party (JNS)	16 February 1931	28 June 1931	1891–1945
Dragutin S. Kojić		Yugoslav National Party (JNS)	1 July 1931	4 April 1932	
Božidar Maksimović		Yugoslav National Party (JNS)	4 April 1932	3 July 1932	1886–1969
Ilija Šumenković		Yugoslav National Party (JNS)	3 July 1932	5 November 1932	
Božidar Maksimović		Yugoslav National Party (JNS)	5 November 1932	22 December 1934	1886–1969
Dragutin S. Kojić		Yugoslav National Party (JNS)	22 December 1934	24 June 1935	
Dragutin S. Kojić		Yugoslav Radical Union (JRS)	22 December 1934	24 June 1935	
Ljudevit Auer		Slovenian People's Party (SLS)	24 June 1935	September 1935	1892–1973
Mile Miškulin		Yugoslav Radical Union (JRS)	September 1935	7 March 1936	1873–1953
Dragiša Cvetković		Yugoslav Radical Union (JRS)	7 March 1936	1936	1893–1969
Nikola Subotić		Yugoslav Radical Union (JRS)	1936	4 October 1937	
Milan Simonović		Yugoslav Radical Union (JRS)	4 October 1937	5 February 1939	
Viktor Ružić		Independent	5 February 1939	26 August 1939	1893–1976
Lazar Marković		Yugoslav Radical Union (JRS)	26 August 1939	March 1941	1882–1955
Mihailo Konstantinović		Yugoslav Radical Union (JRS)	March 1941	27 March 1941	1897–1982

=== Yugoslav government-in-exile (1941–1945) ===
Minister	Image	Party	Term start	Term end	Lifespan
Božidar Marković		Democratic Party (DS)	27 March 1941	12 January 1942	1874–1946
Milan Gavrilović			12 January 1942	26 June 1943	1882–1972
Nikola Mirošević-Sorgo			26 June 1943	10 August 1943	1885–1966
Vladeta Milićević			10 August 1943	8 July 1944	
Drago Marušič		Independent	8 July 1944	7 March 1945	1884–1975

=== SFR Yugoslavia (1945–1992) ===
Minister	Image	Party	Term start	Term end	Lifespan
Frane Frol		Croatian Peasant Party (HSS)	7 March 1945	14 January 1953	1899–1989
Frane Frol		Communist Party of Yugoslavia (SKJ)	7 March 1945	14 January 1953	1899–1989
Arnold Rajh		League of Communists of Yugoslavia (SKJ)	30 June 1963	12 March 1965	1907–
Milorad Zorić		League of Communists of Yugoslavia (SKJ)	12 March 1965	18 May 1967	1913–
Boris Šnuderl		League of Communists of Yugoslavia (SKJ)	30 July 1971	3 December 1971	1926–
Mugbil Bejzat		League of Communists of Yugoslavia (SKJ)	3 December 1971	17 May 1974	1932–
Ivan Franko		League of Communists of Yugoslavia (SKJ)	17 May 1974	16 May 1978	1922–
Luka Banović		League of Communists of Yugoslavia (SKJ)	16 May 1978	16 May 1982	1926–?
Borislav Krajina		League of Communists of Yugoslavia (SKJ)	16 May 1982	16 May 1986	1930–
Petar Vajović		League of Communists of Yugoslavia (SKJ)	16 May 1986	16 March 1989	
Vlado Kambovski		League of Communists of Yugoslavia (SKJ)	16 March 1989	14 July 1992	1948–

== See also ==
- Ministry of Justice (Serbia and Montenegro)
- Ministry of Justice (Bosnia and Herzegovina)
- Ministry of Justice, Public Administration and Digital Transformation (Croatia)
- Ministry of Justice (Kosovo)
- Ministry of Justice and Human and Minority Rights (Montenegro)
- Ministry of Justice (North Macedonia)
- Ministry of Justice (Serbia)
- Ministry of Justice (Slovenia)
