= Milorad Vujičić =

Serbian and Yugoslav politician

- Милорад Вујичић
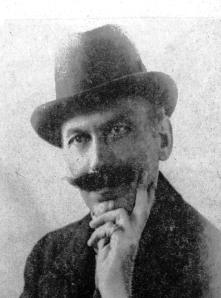
- Image of Vujičić taken from the Digital Library of Slovenia

Minister of Justice of Yugoslavia
- In office 23 February 1928 – 7 January 1929
- Prime Minister: Velimir Vukićević; Anton Korošec
- Preceded by: Dušan Subotić
- Succeeded by: Milan Srškić

Minister of the Interior of Yugoslavia
- In office 17 December 1922 – 27 March 1924
- Prime Minister: Nikola Pašić
- Preceded by: Vojislav Marinković
- Succeeded by: Milan Srškić

Personal details
- Born: 1 February 1869 Radoinja (Nova Varoš), Ottoman Empire
- Died: 29 April 1936 (aged 67) Belgrade, Kingdom of Yugoslavia
- Party: People's Radical Party
- Education: University of Belgrade
- Occupation: Lawyer, politician

Milorad Vujičić (Serbian Cyrillic: Милорад Вујичић; 1 February 1869 – 29 April 1936) was a Serbian lawyer and politician who served as minister in various portfolios of the Kingdom of Yugoslavia.

== Biography ==
Vujičić was born in the village of Radoinja near Nova Varoš on 1 February 1869, in what was then the Ottoman Empire. His father Anta, an Orthodox priest, fled to the Principality of Serbia in 1875, on the eve of the Herzegovina uprising (1875–1877) and the First Serbian–Ottoman War and settled with his family in Bajina Bašta. Vujičić was educated in Čačak and in Užice, where he graduated. He subsequently studied and graduated from the Faculty of Law, University of Belgrade in 1894. He began working in the police of the Kingdom of Serbia, and in 1896 rose from officer to district chief.

In 1898 he started working as a secretary of the Jadranska Lešnica district, later becoming secretary and head of the Podrinje district, head of the Azbukovica district and an official of the Ministry of Internal Affairs in Belgrade in 1909. As a reserve officer, Vujičić fought for the Royal Serbian Army in the Balkan Wars and World War I; he rose to the rank of captain 1st class and was sent to Odessa to train the First Serbian Volunteer Division from Austro-Hungarian POWs in Russia. After the start of the October Revolution he returned to Serbia.

After the end of the war he became involved in politics: he first joined the People's Radical Party (NRS) and was elected as a deputy for the Podrinje district in the 1920. In the 1923, 1925 and 1927 elections he was elected from the Užice district, on the NRS lists led by Miloš Trifunović. He was vice-president of the National Assembly and during the government of Nikola Pašić he was appointed Minister of the Interior (1922–1924). He was later appointed Minister of Construction (April–December 1926), Minister of Religious Affairs (1926–1927) and Minister of Post and Telegraph (February 1927) during the government of Nikola Uzunović and as Minister of Justice (February 1928 – January 1929) during the governments of Velimir Vukićević and Anton Korošec (1928–1929). Following the declaration of the 6 January Dictatorship in 1929, he stopped participating in politics.

He was awarded several decorations, including the Order of the White Eagle, the Order of St. Sava and the Order of Karađorđe's Star. He died in Belgrade on 26 April 1936 and was buried in Bajina Bašta.

== Bibliography ==
- Pivnički-Drinić, T. (2006). Vujičić, Milorad A (in Serbian). Vol. 2. Novi Sad: Srpski biografski rečnik.
- Ljušić, Radoš; Dimic, Ljubodrag (2005). Vlade Srbije (1805–2005) (in Serbian). Beograd: Zavod za udzbenike. ISBN 9788617131119.
- Marjanović, B. (2006). Vujičić, Milorad (in Serbian). Beograde: Biografski leksikon Zlatiborskog okruga.
- "Smrt jednog zaslužnog političara [Death of a meritorious politician]". Politika (in Serbian). Beograd. 30 April 1936.
- Spomenica čačanske Realne gimnazije 1837–1937 (in Serbian). Čačak. 1938.
- Gligorijević, B. Parlament i političke stranke u Jugoslaviji 1919–1929 (in Serbian). Beograd.

Political offices
Preceded by Vojislav Marinković	Minister of the Interior of Yugoslavia; 1922–1924	Succeeded by Milan Srškić
Preceded by Dušan Subotić	Minister of Justice of Yugoslavia; 1928–1929	Succeeded by Milan Srškić
