= Ministry of the Interior (Yugoslavia) =

Yugoslavian government ministry responsible for internal affairs

- Serbo-Croatian: Ministarstvo unutrašnjih poslova/Министарство унутрашњих послова Slovene: Ministrstvo za notranje zadeve Macedonian: Министерство за внатрешни работи

Ministry overview
- Formed: 1 December 1918; 107 years ago
- Dissolved: 14 July 1992; 34 years ago
- Jurisdiction: Yugoslavia
- Headquarters: Belgrade
- Ministers responsible: Marko Trifković, first Minister of the Interior; Petar Gračanin, last Minister of the Interior
- Parent department: Federal Executive Council (1953–1992)

The Ministry of the Interior was the internal affairs ministry in the Kingdom of Yugoslavia from 1918 to 1945 and the communist SFR Yugoslavia from 1945 to 1992.

== List of ministers ==
=== Kingdom of Yugoslavia (1918–1941) ===
No.	Portrait	Minister	Took office	Left office	Time in office	Party
1	Marko Trifković	Marko Trifković (1864–1928)	1 December 1918	20 December 1918	19 days	NRS
2	Svetozar Pribićević	Svetozar Pribićević (1875–1936)	20 December 1918	19 February 1920	1 year, 61 days	DS
(1)	Marko Trifković	Marko Trifković (1864–1928)	19 February 1920	16 May 1920	87 days	NRS
3	Ljubomir Davidović	Ljubomir Davidović (1863–1940)	16 May 1920	1 January 1921	230 days	DS
4	Milorad Drašković	Milorad Drašković (1873–1921)	1 January 1921	21 July 1921 †	201 days	DS
(2)	Svetozar Pribićević	Svetozar Pribićević (1875–1936)	21 July 1921	24 December 1921	156 days	DS
5	Vojislav Marinković	Vojislav Marinković (1876–1935)	24 December 1921	24 June 1922	182 days	DS
6	Milorad Vujičić	Milorad Vujičić (1869–1936)	17 December 1922	27 March 1924	1 year, 101 days	NRS
7	Milan Srškić	Milan Srškić (1880–1937)	27 March 1924	28 July 1924	123 days	NRS
8	Nastas Petrović	Nastas Petrović (1867–1928)	28 July 1924	6 November 1924	101 days	NRS
9	Božidar Maksimović	Božidar Maksimović (1886–1969)	6 November 1924	17 April 1927	2 years, 162 days	NRS
10	Velimir Vukićević	Velimir Vukićević (1871–1930)	17 April 1927	13 January 1928	271 days	NRS
11	Čedomir Radović	Čedomir Radović	13 January 1928	23 February 1928	41 days	?
12	Anton Korošec	Anton Korošec (1872–1940)	28 February 1928	7 January 1929	314 days	SLS
13	Petar Živković	Petar Živković (1879–1953)	7 January 1929	5 January 1932	2 years, 363 days	JNS
(7)	Milan Srškić	Milan Srškić (1880–1937)	5 January 1932	11 July 1932	188 days	JNS
14	Živojin Lazić	Živojin Lazić (1876–1958)	11 July 1932	22 December 1934	2 years, 164 days	JNS
15	Velimir Popović	Velimir Popović	22 December 1934	24 June 1935	184 days	JNS; JRZ
(12)	Anton Korošec	Anton Korošec (1872–1940)	24 June 1935	21 December 1938	3 years, 180 days	SLS
16	Milan Aćimović	Milan Aćimović (1898–1945)	21 December 1938	5 February 1939	46 days	JRZ
17	Dragiša Cvetković	Dragiša Cvetković (1893–1969)	5 February 1939	26 August 1939	202 days	JRZ
18	Stanoje Mihaldžić	Stanoje Mihaldžić (1892–1956)	26 August 1939	8 July 1940	317 days	JRZ
(17)	Dragiša Cvetković	Dragiša Cvetković (1893–1969)	8 July 1940	27 March 1941	262 days	JRZ
19	Srđan Budisavljević	Srđan Budisavljević (1883–1968)	27 March 1941	18 April 1941	22 days	SDS

=== Yugoslav government-in-exile (1941–1945) ===
No.	Portrait	Minister	Took office	Left office	Time in office	Party
1	Srđan Budisavljević	Srđan Budisavljević (1883–1968)	18 April 1941	21 August 1941	125 days	SDS
2	Dušan Simović	Dušan Simović (1882–1962)	21 August 1941	11 January 1942	143 days	Independent
3	Slobodan Jovanović	Slobodan Jovanović (1869–1958)	12 January 1942	26 June 1943	1 year, 166 days	Independent
4	Miloš Trifunović	Miloš Trifunović (1871–1957)	26 June 1943	10 August 1943	45 days	NRS
5	Vladeta Milićević	Vladeta Milićević (1898–1969)	10 August 1943	8 July 1944	333 days	Independent
6	Sava Kosanović	Sava Kosanović (1894–1956)	8 July 1944	7 March 1945	242 days	SDS

=== SFR Yugoslavia (1945–1992) ===
No.	Portrait	Minister	Took office	Left office	Time in office	Party
1	Vlada Zečević	Vlada Zečević (1903–1970)	7 March 1945	2 February 1946	332 days	SKJ
2	Aleksandar Ranković	Aleksandar Ranković (1909–1983)	2 February 1946	14 January 1953	6 years, 347 days	SKJ
3	Svetislav Stefanović	Svetislav Stefanović (1910–1980)	14 January 1953	18 April 1963	10 years, 94 days	SKJ
4	Vojin Lukić	Vojin Lukić (1919–1997)	18 April 1963	12 March 1965	1 year, 328 days	SKJ
5	Milan Mišković	Milan Mišković (1918–1978)	12 March 1965	18 May 1967	2 years, 67 days	SKJ
6	Radovan Stijačić	Radovan Stijačić (1918–1989)	18 May 1967	30 July 1971	4 years, 73 days	SKJ
7	Džemal Bijedić	Džemal Bijedić (1917–1977)	30 July 1971	3 December 1971	126 days	SKJ
8	Luka Banović	Luka Banović (1926–2006)	3 December 1971	17 May 1974	2 years, 165 days	SKJ
9	Franjo Herljević	Franjo Herljević (1915–1998)	17 May 1974	16 May 1982	7 years, 364 days	SKJ
10	Stane Dolanc	Stane Dolanc (1925–1999)	16 May 1982	15 May 1984	1 year, 365 days	SKJ
11	Dobroslav Ćulafić	Dobroslav Ćulafić (1926–2011)	15 May 1984	16 May 1989	5 years, 1 day	SKJ
12	Petar Gračanin	Petar Gračanin (1923–2004)	16 May 1989	14 July 1992	3 years, 59 days	SKJ; SPS

== See also ==
- Ministry of the Interior (Serbia and Montenegro)
- Ministry of Interior (Federation of Bosnia and Herzegovina)
- Ministry of Interior (Republika Srpska)
- Ministry of the Interior (Croatia)
- Ministry of Internal Affairs (Montenegro)
- Ministry of Internal Affairs (North Macedonia)
- Ministry of Internal Affairs (Serbia)
- Ministry of the Interior (Slovenia)
