= Vojislav Marinković =

Serbian and Yugoslav diplomat and politician (1876–1935)

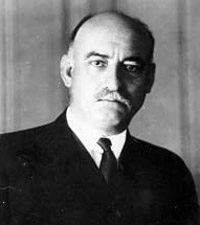

9th prime minister of Yugoslavia
- In office 4 April 1932 – 3 July 1932
- Monarch: Alexander I
- Preceded by: Petar Živković
- Succeeded by: Milan Srškić

Minister of Foreign Affairs
- In office 17 April 1927 – 3 July 1932
- Preceded by: Ninko Perić
- Succeeded by: Bogoljub Jevtić
- In office 27 July 1924 – 6 November 1924
- Preceded by: Momčilo Ninčić
- Succeeded by: Momčilo Ninčić

Minister of the Interior
- In office 24 December 1921 – 24 June 1924
- Preceded by: Svetozar Pribićević
- Succeeded by: Milorad Vujičić

Minister of Economy
- In office 1914–1917

Personal details
- Born: 13 May 1876 Belgrade, Serbia
- Died: 18 September 1935 (aged 59) Belgrade, Yugoslavia
- Party: Democratic Party; Yugoslav National Party
- Spouse: Ana Lozanić
- Parent(s): Dimitrije Marinković; Velika Klajn
- Education: University of Belgrade
- Profession: Economist

Vojislav Marinković (Serbian Cyrillic: Војислав Маринковић; 13 May 1876 – 18 September 1935) was a Serbian and Yugoslav diplomat and politician, serving two times as Minister of Foreign Affairs and briefly as Prime Minister of the Kingdom of Yugoslavia.

== Beginnings ==
Marinković was born in Belgrade, then capital of the Principality of Serbia, in 1876. His parents were Dimitrije Marinković, lawyer and politician, and Velika (née Klajn). He attended secondary school in the city, graduated at the University of Belgrade Faculty of Law and later received doctorate in political science and economics in Paris.

From 1901, he worked in the Ministry of Finance and was director of the Business Bank. He was deputy of the Serbian Parliament from 1906. From 1914 to 1917, he served as Minister of Economy. Again minister at the end of 1918, he participated in the Paris Peace Conference, 1919.

== Parliamentary period in Yugoslavia ==
He served as Minister of the Interior briefly at the end of 1921 and beginning of 1922.

He served as Minister of Foreign Affairs in the governments of Ljubomir Davidović (for a few months of 1924), Velimir Vukićević and Anton Korošec, last in the parliamentary term.

== Royal dictatorship ==
Marinković with Alexandru Vaida-Voevod and Ioan Victor Stârcea

With the proclamation of the 6 January Dictatorship in 1929, Marinković entered the cabinet chaired by the former commander of the Royal Guard, General Petar Živković. He replaced Živković as prime minister in April 1932, with the aim of changing the image of the dictatorship thanks to his experience as a veteran deputy and distinguished member of the Democratic Party.

During his short tenure as the head of the government, he softened political repression, allowing contacts between the old parties. His program, which was left unimplemented by his early dismissal, included the liberalization of the electoral law passed in 1931 and the revision of the 1931 Constitution, approved during the dictatorship. He publicly mentioned the possibility of calling a referendum on the federalization of the country, which upset both some of his ministers and the King, who relieved him in July 1932. He was succeeded as prime minister by his former Minister of the Interior, Milan Srškić, opposed to the rapid liberalization advocated by Marinković.

== Personal life ==
He was married to Ana (1881–1973), painter and daughter of chemist Sima Lozanić. They had no children.

== Bibliography ==
- Yugoslav Archive (2008). "Premijeri" (in Serbo-Croatian). Archived from the original on 29 November 2020.
- Ministry of Foreign Affairs of Serbia. "Lista popecitelja i ministara inostranih poslova od obrazovanja prve vlade 1811. Godine do danasnjeg dana" (in Serbo-Croatian).
- Pavlović, Stevan K. (1971). Yugoslavia. Praeger Publishers. p. 416. OCLC 200171.

Political offices
| Preceded by Petar Živković | Prime Minister of Yugoslavia; 1932 | Succeeded by Milan Srškić |
| Preceded by Velizar S. Janković | Minister of Economy; 1914–1917 | Succeeded by Velizar S. Janković |
| Preceded by Momčilo Ninčić | Minister of Internal Affairs; 1921–1924 | Succeeded by Momčilo Ninčić |
| Preceded by Momčilo Ninčić | Minister of Foreign Affairs; 1924 | Succeeded by Momčilo Ninčić |
| Preceded by Ninko Perić | Minister of Foreign Affairs; 1927–1932 | Succeeded by Bogoljub Jevtić |
