= Stanoje Mihaldžić =

Serbian and Yugoslav politician

- Станоје Михалџић
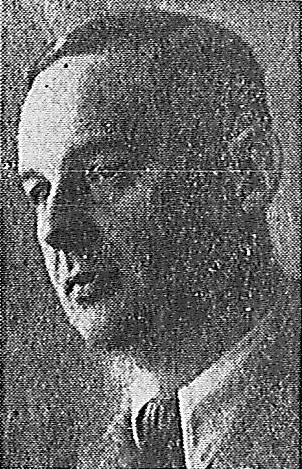
- Stanoje Mihaldžič

Ban of the Drina Banovina
- In office 10 July 1940 – 17 April 1941
- Preceded by: Vladimir Jevtić

Minister of the Interior
- In office 26 August 1939 – 8 July 1940
- Prime Minister: Dragiša Cvetković
- Preceded by: Dragiša Cvetković
- Succeeded by: Dragiša Cvetković (acting)

Ban of the Sava Banovina Acting
- In office 25 August 1938 – 26 August 1939
- Preceded by: Viktor Ružić
- Succeeded by: Ivan Šubašić (as Ban of Banovina of Croatia)

Personal details
- Born: 4 June 1892 Jasenovac, Croatia-Slavonia, Austria-Hungary (now Croatia)
- Died: 3 June 1956 (aged 63) Belgrade, SR Serbia, Yugoslavia (now Serbia)
- Resting place: Mirogoj Cemetery, Zagreb
- Party: Yugoslav Radical Union
- Education: University of Zagreb

Military service
- Allegiance: Kingdom of Serbia
- Branch/service: Royal Serbian Army
- Rank: Lieutenant
- Battles/wars: World War I: Macedonian front

Stanoje Mihaldžič (Serbian Cyrillic: Станоје Михалџић; 4 June 1892 – 3 June 1956) was a Yugoslav politician who served as the Minister of the Interior of the Kingdom of Yugoslavia from 26 August 1939 to 8 July 1940 and then as the Ban of Drina Banovina from 10 July 1940 to 17 April 1941.

== Biography ==
Mihaldžić was born to Croatian Serb parents on 4 June 1892 in Jasenovac, then part of Austria-Hungary. After finishing elementary school in Zagreb, and high school in Budapest, he graduated from the Faculty of Law, University of Zagreb. During World War I, Mihaldžić volunteered in the Royal Serbian Army and fought on the Macedonian front as a reserve lieutenant.

After the war, Mihaldžić served as the police chief in Novi Sad, until his transfer to Subotica, and his next transfer to Zagreb. He was later named the Deputy Ban of Sava Banovina, and after the retirement of Ban Viktor Ružić, Mihaldžić served as acting Ban. He was one of the main initiators and member of many social, cultural and humanitarian organizations in Zagreb.

After the Cvetković-Maček agreement, a new government was formed on 26 August 1939, with Dragiša Cvetković of the Yugoslav Radical Union as Prime Minister and Vladko Maček of the Croatian Peasant Party as Deputy Prime Minister. Mihaldžić was named Minister of the Interior in this government. Mihaldžić was a Freemason and an Anglophile and in 1940, under the guise of an economic office in Belgrade, he employed a group of Slovenes who were spying for the British. Nazi Germany put pressure on the Yugoslav government, explaining that there were "too many Freemasons" in the government, and Mihaldžić was removed from office on 8 July 1940 and on 10 July 1940 named the Ban of the Drina Banovina, a post he held until the capitulation of Yugoslavia on 17 April 1941 to Nazi Germany in the April War.

According to some, he was killed in mid 1941 in Sarajevo by the Germans or Ustaše due to his ties with the British, and according to others he was captured by the Germans, taken to Graz and survived the war. His fate is still unknown. According to the "Serbian Biographical Dictionary", after the World War II, he lived in Belgrade and died on 3 June 1956. He was buried at the Mirogoj Cemetery in Zagreb.
