= Ministry of Finance (Yugoslavia) =

Yugoslavian government ministry responsible for financial system

- Serbo-Croatian: Ministarstvo finansija/Министарство финансија Slovene: Ministrstvo za finance Macedonian: Министерство за финансии

Ministry overview
- Formed: 1 December 1918; 107 years ago
- Dissolved: 1991; 35 years ago
- Jurisdiction: Yugoslavia
- Headquarters: Belgrade
- Ministers responsible: Stojan Protić, first Minister of Finance; Branko Zekan, last Minister of Finance
- Parent department: Federal Executive Council (1953–1992)

The Ministry of Finance was the finance ministry responsible for the financial system of the Kingdom of Yugoslavia from 1918 to 1941 and the communist SFR Yugoslavia from 1945 to 1992.

== List of ministers ==
=== Kingdom of Yugoslavia (1918–1941) ===
Minister	Image	Party	Term start	Term end	Lifespan
Stojan Protić		People's Radical Party (NRS)	1 December 1918	20 December 1918	1857–1923
Momčilo Ninčić		People's Radical Party (NRS)	20 December 1918	16 August 1919	1876–1949
Vojislav Veljković		Democratic Party (DS)	16 August 1919	19 February 1920	1865–1931
Velizar S. Janković		People's Radical Party (NRS)	19 February 1920	16 May 1920	
Kosta Stojanović		Democratic Party (DS)	16 May 1920	3 January 1921 (Died in office)	1867–1921
Milorad Drašković; Acting Minister		Democratic Party (DS)	3 January 1921	31 March 1921	1873–1921
Kosta Kumanudi		Democratic Party (DS)	31 March 1921	16 December 1922	1874–1962
Milan Stojadinović		People's Radical Party (NRS)	22 December 1922	28 July 1924	1888–1961
Mehmed Spaho		Yugoslav Muslim Organization (JMO)	28 July 1924	6 November 1924	1883–1939
Milan Stojadinović		People's Radical Party (NRS)	6 November 1924	8 April 1926	1888–1961
Nikola Uzunović; Acting Minister		People's Radical Party (NRS)	8 April 1926	13 April 1926	1873–1954
Ninko Perić		People's Radical Party (NRS)	15 April 1926	24 December 1926	1886–1961
Bogdan Marković		People's Radical Party (NRS)	26 December 1926	28 July 1928	1880–1938
Niko Subotić			28 July 1928	7 January 1929	
Stanko Švrljuga		Yugoslav National Party (JNS)	7 January 1929	19 June 1931	1880–1958
Đorđe Đurić		Yugoslav National Party (JNS)	19 June 1931	September 1931	
Milorad Đorđević		Yugoslav National Party (JNS)	September 1931	22 December 1934	
Milan Stojadinović		Yugoslav National Party (JNS)	22 December 1934	24 June 1935	1888–1961
Milan Stojadinović		Yugoslav Radical Union (JRS)	22 December 1934	24 June 1935	1888–1961
Marko Kožul		Yugoslav Radical Union (JRS)	24 June 1935	7 March 1936	
Dušan Letica		Yugoslav Radical Union (JRS)	7 March 1936	5 February 1939	1884–1945
Vojin Đuričić		Yugoslav Radical Union (JRS)	5 February 1939	26 August 1939	1888–1944
Juraj Šutej		Croatian Peasant Party (HSS)	26 August 1939	18 April 1941	1889–1976

=== Yugoslav government-in-exile (1941–1945) ===
Minister	Image	Party	Term start	Term end	Lifespan
Juraj Šutej		Croatian Peasant Party (HSS)	18 April 1941	10 August 1943	1889–1976
Milan Martinović			10 August 1943	1 January 1944	
Nenad Grigozono			1 January 1944	8 July 1944	
Juraj Šutej		Croatian Peasant Party (HSS)	8 July 1944	7 March 1945	1889–1976

=== SFR Yugoslavia (1945–1992) ===
Minister	Image	Party	Term start	Term end	Lifespan
Sreten Žujović		Communist Party of Yugoslavia (KPJ)	7 March 1945	6 May 1948	1899–1976
Dobrivoje Radosavljević		Communist Party of Yugoslavia (KPJ)	6 May 1948	14 January 1953	1915–1984
Radisav Nedeljković		League of Communists of Yugoslavia (SKJ)	14 January 1953	30 January 1954	1911–1996
Neda Božinović		League of Communists of Yugoslavia (SKJ)	30 January 1954	1 January 1956	1917–2001
Avdo Humo		League of Communists of Yugoslavia (SKJ)	1 January 1956	19 April 1958	1914–1983
Nikola Minčev		League of Communists of Yugoslavia (SKJ)	19 April 1958	1 June 1962	1915–1997
Kiro Gligorov		League of Communists of Yugoslavia (SKJ)	1 June 1962	18 May 1967	1917–2012
Janko Smole		League of Communists of Yugoslavia (SKJ)	18 May 1967	17 May 1974	1921–2010
Momčilo Cemović		League of Communists of Yugoslavia (SKJ)	17 May 1974	16 May 1978	1928–2001
Petar Kostić		League of Communists of Yugoslavia (SKJ)	16 May 1978	16 May 1982	1928–
Jože Florijančić		League of Communists of Yugoslavia (SKJ)	16 May 1982	13 December 1983	1935–
Vlado Klemenčić		League of Communists of Yugoslavia (SKJ)	13 December 1983	16 May 1986	1926–
Svetozar Rikanović		League of Communists of Yugoslavia (SKJ)	16 May 1986	16 March 1989	
Branko Zekan		League of Communists of Yugoslavia (SKJ)	16 March 1989	1991	

== See also ==
- National Bank of Yugoslavia
- Ministry of Finance (Serbia and Montenegro)
- Ministry of Finance and Treasury (Bosnia and Herzegovina)
- Ministry of Finance (Croatia)
- Ministry of Finance (Kosovo)
- Ministry of Finance (Montenegro)
- Ministry of Finance (North Macedonia)
- Ministry of Finance (Serbia)
- Minister of Finance (Slovenia)
