= Ninko Perić =

Serbian lawyer and politician (1886–1961)

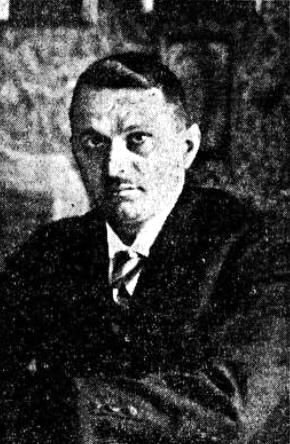
Ninko Perić (1928 or earlier)

Ninko Perić (Bojić, May 14, 1886 – Belgrade, April 24, 1961) was a Serbian lawyer and politician.

== Biography ==
He finished high school in Šabac and Belgrade. He graduated from the Faculty of Law in Belgrade in 1910. He was elected president of the Fund for Poor Students in the same year. As a protégé of the Angelina Marić Foundation, he attended doctoral studies in the field of private law in Paris from 1910 to 1912. He was the initiator of the foundation of the Association of Yugoslav Students in Paris. Božidar Purić was elected president of the management board, and Ninko Perić was elected president of the supervisory board. According to the conditions of the Fund, the doctoral dissertation was defended at the Faculty of Law in Belgrade. He then spent several months in Geneva, where he collected materials for future scientific works in libraries. During the First Balkan War, he returned to Serbia and signed up for the army as a volunteer, but was rejected for medical reasons.

== Career as a civil servant ==
After completing his studies in Geneva, he was appointed clerk of the Court of First Instance for the city of Belgrade in October 1913. At the beginning of the First World War, he joined the Serbian army as a volunteer. He was an investigator at the Military Station of the Užice Detachment and at the Valjevo Garrison. In Valjevo, he suffered typhus in 1914, under the watchful care of Dr. Avram Josif Vinaver and his wife Ruža. He was then transferred to the Šabac district command, where he served until the demobilization of the command on November 5, 1915.

He came into contact with the government of the Kingdom of Serbia in Shkodër in January 1916. Minister of Finance Momčilo Ninčić employed him in his department. For the next year and a half, he was on duty in Marseille, Geneva and Corfu. He was then appointed as a 5th class secretary of the Ministry of Foreign Affairs in October 1917, and Nikola Pašić chose him as his secretary, to accompany him on his way to Rome, Paris, London, and Evian Spa. He then appointed him as the head of the Cabinet of the President of the Council of Ministers. He was Nikola Pašić's secretary at the Paris Peace Conference.

According to his wishes, he left the diplomatic service and became a professor of private international law and civil law at the Faculty of Law in Belgrade in March 1920, and in the same year he also taught at the Faculty of Law in Subotica.

He left his career as a professor after Nikola Pašić formed the first homogeneous radical government on December 16, 1922, and appointed Ninko Perić as Minister of Social Policy. The continuation of his career was inextricably linked with Nikola Pašić, King Alexander and Petar Živković, according to whose wishes he was given various functions. At the Ministry of Finance and the Ministry of Foreign Affairs, he did not leave a deep mark, because he stayed in the positions of minister for a relatively short time. He left a slightly more visible mark as Minister of Justice. After the Marseille assassination, he remained on good terms with Bogoljub Jevtić, who offered him the position of ambassador in Bucharest in January 1935. He was appointed to that position in March of the same year and held it until mid-May 1936. Milan Stojadinović wanted to transfer him as an ambassador to Brussels in January 1936, but the Belgian government did not give his approval. Ninko Perić officially retired on June 29, 1936.

- Secretary of the delegation of the Kingdom of SHS at the Peace Conference in Paris. Elected as an associate professor at the Faculty of Law in Belgrade in 1920.
- Minister of Social Policy from May 4 to July 31, 1923. Minister of Finance from April 15 to December 24, 1926.
- Minister of Foreign Affairs from December 24, 1926, to April 12, 1927.
- Minister without portfolio from April 17 to June 16, represented the ministers of justice, education, and religion.
- President of the National Assembly 1927–28.
- President of the State Council 1930–31.
- Ambassador in Bucharest 1935–36.

== Political career ==
Ninko Perić has been an active member of the People's Radical Party since his student days, first as a member of the radical club Slovenski jug, and then as a member of the editorial staff of the magazine "Slovenski jug", which was started by Professor Božidar Marković. In addition to Ninko Perić, the members of the editorial board were Milan Stojadinović and Veljko Popović. For the first time, he participated in the pre-election campaign in Pocer County in 1908. When Nikola Pašić approved Ninko Perić's transfer from the Ministry of Foreign Affairs to the University of Belgrade, he ordered his father-in-law Draža Petrović to start preparing the ground for his parliamentary candidacy in the Pocer region, judging that it would be better for him to stay in politics than to dedicate himself to an academic career. For the first time, he was elected as a member of parliament in the elections for the Constituent Assembly in 1920, for the Pocer region. He was later elected in the same region in the parliamentary elections of 1923, 1925, 1927 and 1931. As a representative of the Pocer region, Ninko Perić was responsible, among other things, for strengthening the party structure in Eastern Slavonia. Relations between Ninko Perić and Nikola Pašić cooled down in 1924, due to bad relations between Perić and Radomir (Rada) Pašić. However, King Aleksandar and Petar Živković began to show more and more trust and affection towards Ninko Perić from 1925, and his career as a politician and as a civil servant continued to develop under their protection. Ninko Perić and Milan Stojadinović have been friends since their student days. Their relationship cooled down suddenly, since Perić succeeded Stojadinović as the head of the Ministry of Finance in the government of Nikola Uzunović in April 1926. His political career ended with his appointment as an ambassador in Bucharest in 1935.

== Personal life ==
Ninko Perić married Angelina (Gina) Petrović, the daughter of the prominent Šabac Radical Dragomir Draža Petrović, with whom he had three children.

== Works ==
He has published a large number of professional works.

- Менична способност (1909)
- Теорија злоупотребе права (1912)
- Основи грађанског права - општи део (1922)
- Међународно приватно право (1926)

== Literature ==
Miletić, Aleksandar R. (2003). "From the memoirs of Ninka Perić (1886-1960)". "Currents of history". 1—2 (Institute for the Recent History of Serbia): 141–160. [https://tokovi.istorije.rs/cir/uploaded/1%202%202003/1%202%202003/2003_1-2_07_Miletic.pdf]
