= Bogoljub Jevtić =

Serbian diplomat & politician (1886–1960)

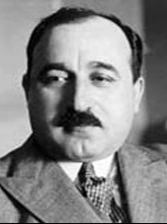

11th Prime Minister of Yugoslavia
- In office 22 December 1934 – 24 June 1935
- Monarch: Peter II
- Preceded by: Nikola Uzunović
- Succeeded by: Milan Stojadinović

Personal details
- Born: 24 December 1886 Kragujevac, Kingdom of Serbia
- Died: 7 June 1960 (aged 73) Paris, France
- Party: Yugoslav National Party (Until 1935); Yugoslav Radical Union (From 1935)

Bogoljub Jevtić (Serbian Cyrillic: Богољуб Јевтић; 24 December 1886 – 7 June 1960) was a Serbian diplomat and politician in the Kingdom of Yugoslavia.

He was plenipotentiary minister of Yugoslavia in Albania, Austria and Hungary. After the assassination of King Alexander I of Yugoslavia, on 22 December 1934 he was appointed prime minister of Yugoslavia, holding this position until 24 June 1935.

== Early life and career ==
Jevtić was born in 1886 in Kragujevac, where he completed his elementary and high school education. He enrolled at the University of Belgrade and became a doctor of laws in 1911. He studied economics at the University of Zurich and, continued in the Handelshochschule in Berlin, where he took his second doctor's degree.

Meanwhile, the pan-Slavic-Greek alliance of the Balkan states against the Ottomans was being concluded. In the north, Austrians were threatening. Jevtić, a patriot, would take up arms and join the firing line, first with the Greeks and Bulgarians against the Ottomans, then against the Bulgarians who wanted to compromise the Greek-Serbian Alliance of 1913.

When World War I intervened, military service took precedence over diplomatic service. Jevtić, an infantry captain, joined the action. Prince Regent Alexander Karadjordjević (later to become Alexander I of Yugoslavia) was informed of his bravery. In 1917, summoned from the front, he returned to diplomacy as an attaché in the Serbian Legation at Stockholm. Then, he was needed at home in the Cabinet. The next step was the Serbian Legation in London, and thereafter Secretary General of the Yugoslav delegation to the peace negotiations in Paris. Edvard Beneš, the leading delegate of the newly proposed Czechoslovakia, held important conversations with Jevtić, and the two became friends. He was an adviser to the Kingdom of Serbs, Croats and Slovenes legation in Paris and Brussels in 1924.

As he moved from one post to another, he made the rounds in many different western European countries. There was brief intermezzo as Plenipotentiary Minister to Tirana, from 9 April 1926. Then he was installed as Plenipotentiary Minister in complete charge of the important Vienna and Budapest missions, from 13 January 1928. He did not remain there for even a year, but he noticed the plans that Stjepan Sarkotić, a recently naturalized Austrian, was engineering against the Kingdom of Yugoslavia, aided by former members of the Austro-Hungarian General Staff.

In response to the political crisis triggered by the assassination of Stjepan Radić, King Alexander abolished the Constitution on 6 January 1929, prorogued the Parliament and introduced a personal dictatorship (the so-called "January 6th Dictatorship", Šestojanuarska diktatura). He also changed the name of the country to Kingdom of Yugoslavia and changed the internal divisions from the 33 oblasts to nine new banovinas on 3 October. In the same month, he tried to banish by decree the use of Serbian Cyrillic to promote the exclusive use of Latin alphabet in Yugoslavia.

King Alexander needed a conscientious minister in court and a reliable adviser. Jevtić won his trust on 25 January 1929, becoming Minister of Court, a position he held until 1932 in addition to regular duties; Acting Assistant Minister for Foreign Affairs from 3 February 1929 to 29 October 1930 and Minister for Foreign Affairs from 2 July 1932 to 20 December 1934.

== Dictatorship ==
He became the closest adviser to the head of State in a critical period of its life. He recommended that the formerly democratic king turn to dictatorship as the only way to avoid parliamentary mutiny among the non-Serb element. The army, which had now climbed into the saddle, ruled with a high hand. His brother-in-law, General Petar Živković, was set-up as a strong man by royal decree, and together, they helped each other and the king rule the country. A new constitution, setting up a constitutional dynasty, was prepared. Yugoslavia reverted to the ranks of the semi-dictatorships. The government party, ordained by God, now controlled two thirds of the seats in the Skupština (Parliament).

In the rest of Europe unrest prevailed, and Yugoslavia needed an experienced man to conduct its foreign affairs. The King, who had long been his own adviser, named Jevtić Foreign Minister on 2 July 1932. None of the latter's fundamental beliefs had changed, but he had to bend to the needs of the day.

King Alexander and Jevtić traveled through the Balkans with a burden of peace. Their motto was "the Balkans for the Balkan peoples". Mortal enemies became reconciled. Almost all of them had one enemy—Italy, which was always prepared to spring on them. This brought Yugoslavia and Turkey together, for Turkey feared Italy's expansion in Western Asia. The old hatred of Yugoslavia and Bulgaria was transferred into real friendship when the kings of these two countries kissed one another in a traditional Slavic embrace.

After Berlin had failed to break into southeastern Europe by way of Austria it tried to make headway in Belgrade. It promised Austrian Carinthia to Yugoslavia while Alfred Rosenberg was organizing and financing the central terror organization in Croatia, with the help of Croatian curia and other temporal politicians, including Ante Pavelić. Several possibilities existed including the disintegration of Yugoslavia. If Yugoslavia had cut loose from its allies, breaking away from the Little Entente and approved the Austro-German Anschluss, it could have received a special zone of influence in Carinthia. However, neither King Alexander nor Jevtić could be brought to that point of view while insecurity lingered with Hitler in Germany and Mussolini in Italy.

With everything breaking down in Yugoslavia, especially with the Velebit uprising, "a nation of comrades" had become the popular watchword among the peasantry in Yugoslavia and the rest of Europe. It is peasant support on which Jevtić's power rested, and he was a successful foreign minister. In Belgrade, the insiders whispered that there would presently be a new military soon with Jevtić at its head (a prophecy of sorts), as he was not an active military man but a kind of a general in a frock coat. The national word "comrades" would come into existence.

The Marseille assassination of King Alexander, along with French Foreign Minister Louis Barthou, on 9 October 1934 eliminated the king but not the plan. Jevtić, riding in the car behind the monarch, was the first to rush over to him and reportedly heard Alexander's dying words: "Preserve Yugoslavia!".

== Prime minister ==
Prince Paul of Yugoslavia took Alexander's place instead of Alexander's son Peter, who was then a minor. Paul named Jevtić as prime minister and put Jevtić's brother-in-law Petar Živković in charge of the armed forces. Jevtić had to adapt himself to the result of the Geneva inquiry into Alexander's assassination although it tarnished his popularity at home and his career. However, Jevtić accepted the resolution in the interests of peace.

The assassination had been plotted by the Croat extremist Ante Pavelić and by Ivan Mihailov, the Bulgarian head of the IMRO (Internal Macedonian Revolutionary Organisation). The Yugoslav government's anger was directed towards the Italians and Hungarians for harbouring the Ustaša, but it was not to be a lasting anger because of the actions of both the Italians and Hungarians in the following months and years.

The expected reaction to the death of the unifying leader of Yugoslavia could have resulted in social disorder and political unrest. However, the initial reaction to the assassination in political and social terms was positive; Serbs and Croats both expressed their grief. Instead of breaking up after its leader's death, Yugoslavia appeared more united than ever since 1918, if only until it was invaded in April 1941 by the Axis powers. A report of Alexander's alleged last words, "Preserve Yugoslavia", inspired patriotic fervour, which would ensure attempts to continue his political testament. The assassination thus had the opposite effect to the one intended by the perpetrators.

== Tripartite Pact ==
Prince Paul submitted to the fascist pressure and signed the Tripartite Pact in Vienna on 25 March 1941 but still hoped to still keep Yugoslavia out of the war. Army General Dušan Simović seized power. Jevtić was named Minister of Transportation on 27 March 1941.

== Later life ==
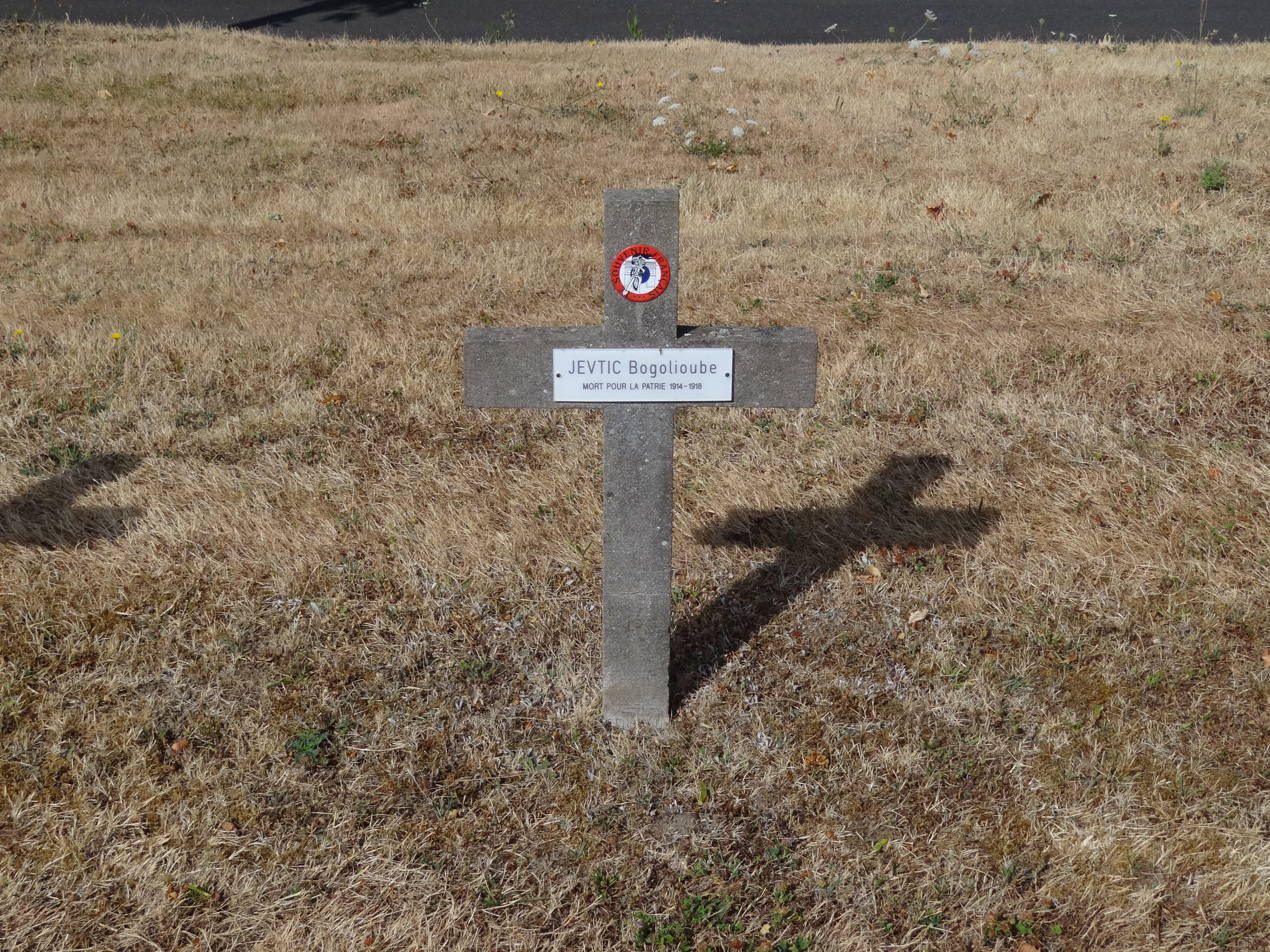
The grave of Bogoljub Jevtić in the cimetière parisien de Thiais.

During and after World War II, Jevtić, in exile along with the rest of the ministers, continued to engage in activities against the Communists in Yugoslavia.

He died in Paris on 7 June 1960, at 73.

Preceded by Nikola Uzunović	Prime Minister of Yugoslavia; 1934-1935	Succeeded by Milan Stojadinović
