= Croatian question =

Issues regarding the status of Croats

The Croatian question (Croatian: Hrvatsko pitanje) refers to a political, cultural, social and economical status of Croats in Austria-Hungary, Kingdom of Yugoslavia, SFR Yugoslavia and post-Dayton Bosnia and Herzegovina.

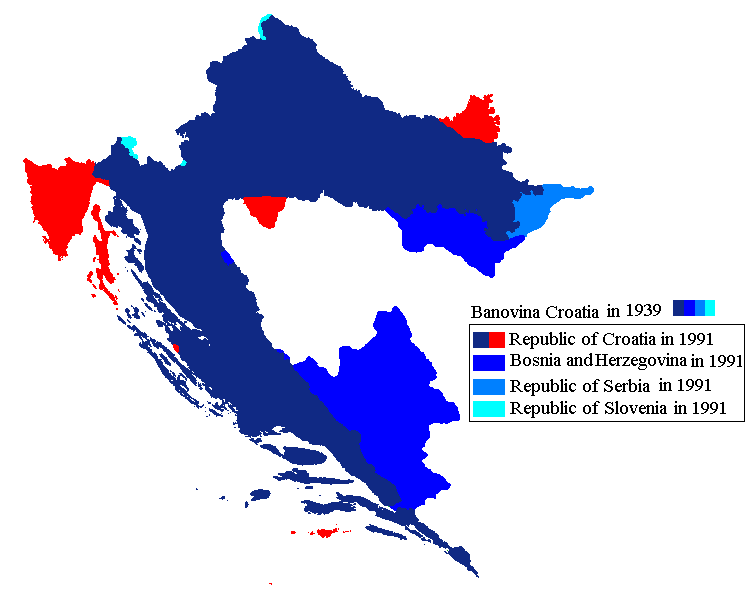
Territory of the Banovina Croatia compared to present-day Croatia and neighbouring states.

The first steps towards Croat home rule were made in 1939 with the Cvetković–Maček Agreement, creating the autonomous Banovina of Croatia. This province, mostly coterminous with the former Sava and Littoral Banovinas with the exception of a few other Croat-majority regions, lasted until invasion of Yugoslavia during the World War II, with the Independent State of Croatia being established as a Nazi German puppet state 10 April 1941.

In post-WWII Yugoslavia, the Croatian national question was mostly resolved on 25 June 1991 with the independence of the Republic of Croatia, from the territory of the constituent SR Croatia.

== Sources ==
- Banac, Ivo (2015). The National Question in Yugoslavia: Origins, History, Politics. Cornell University Press. ISBN 9781501701931.
