= Nikola Uzunović =

Serbian politician (1873–1954)

- Никола Узуновић
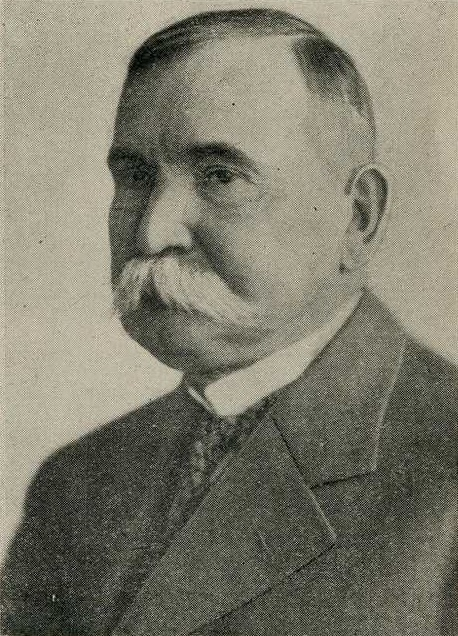
- Uzunović in 1934

5th Prime Minister of Yugoslavia
- In office 27 January 1934 – 22 December 1934
- Monarchs: Alexander I Peter II
- Preceded by: Milan Srškić
- Succeeded by: Bogoljub Jevtić
- In office 8 April 1926 – 17 April 1927
- Monarch: Alexander I
- Preceded by: Nikola Pašić
- Succeeded by: Velimir Vukićević

Personal details
- Born: 3 May 1873 Niš, Ottoman Empire (now Serbia)
- Died: 19 July 1954 (aged 81) Belgrade, PR Serbia, Yugoslavia
- Party: People's Radical Party (until 1932); Yugoslav National Party (from 1932)
- Education: Great School in Belgrade

Nikola Uzunović (Serbian Cyrillic: Никола Узуновић; 3 May 1873 – 19 July 1954) was a Serbian politician who served as Prime Minister of Yugoslavia on two occasions.

== Early life ==
Born in the city of Niš, as Nicola Uzun to a family of Aromanian ancestry, he graduated from Faculty of Law at the Great School in Belgrade (now University of Belgrade). Later he would practice law as a judge, and became the president of the first instance court, the district chief, and secretary of the Cassation Court in Belgrade.

== Political career ==
In 1904, he was elected to the Niš municipality. The following year he became a deputy for the Radical Party. During the First World War Uzunović was a reserve officer, and thereafter politically involved again, re-elected as a deputy. From March 1921 to April 1926, he was minister of land reform, then minister of public works, post and telegraph.

In April 1926, faced with corruption scandals Prime Minister Nikola Pašić was forced resign. Uzunović became the eighth Prime Minister of Yugoslavia on 8 April 1926. However, he was faced with internal conflict within the party, and a succession of short term governments, came and went under his watch. On 17 April 1927, Uzunović's new position as Prime Minister ended. He was replaced by Velimir Vukićević, a member of Uzunovićnew's own National Radical Party.

=== 6 January Dictatorship ===
On 6 January 1929, King Alexander I of Yugoslavia dissolved the Yugoslav Parliament and abolished the constitution, banning all political parties in the process, and establishing a royal dictatorship. In 1931, a new constitution was put into place, which provided for limited democracy. However, most of the political power remained in the hands of the King and the government, appointed by him.

In May 1932, Uzunović helped found the Yugoslav Radical Peasants' Democracy (renamed in June 1933 as Yugoslav National Party) to support Alexander's government, under the leadership of Petar Živković.

In 1932 Uzunović became chairman of the Yugoslav Radical Peasant Democracy. In January 1934, King Alexander, facing mounting pressure to solve the internal political crisis facing Yugoslavia, replaced Milan Srškić as prime minister. On 17 January Uzunović was once again the head of Government. The designated prime minister Uzunović tasked to reduce the Croat - Serb tensions, address the effects of the economic crisis and to combine parliamentarism with an authoritarian conception of government.

=== Assassination of King Alexander ===
In October Alexander of Yugoslavia, despite some missgiving agreed to conference in Marseille, a visit in which the king would reserve the Legion of Honour. It was reported that Uzunović had discouraged the monarch from traveling to Marseille, which would eventually prove fatal for Alexander. Arriving in Marseille to start a state visit to France, to strengthen the two countries' alliance in the Little Entente.

King Alexander was received by Foreign Minister Barthou at Marseille in October 1934. On 9 October, while the two was being slowly driven in a car through the streets a gunman — the Macedonian Velicko Kerin, a Bulgarian revolutionary wielding a handgun. stepped from the street and shot the King twice and the chauffeur with a Mauser C96 semiautomatic pistol. He died in the car, slumped backwards in the seat, with his eyes open. The assassination was planned in Rome by Ante Pavelić in August 1934. Pavelić was assisted by Georg Perčević, a former Austro-Hungarian military officer. France unsuccessfully requested the extraditions of both men.

After the assassination, Uzunović strengthened the government, namely by inviting new ministers and former prime ministers Živković, Marinković and Srškić to the cabinet. However, on 22 December Bogoljub Jevtić was appointed prime minister, removing Uzunović for a second time. Regent Prince Paul, now acting on behalf of the young Peter II of Yugoslavia was, unlike Alexander, inclined much more toward democracy. In its broadest outline, his domestic policy worked to eliminate the heritage of the Alexandrine dictatorship's centralism, censorship, and military control and to pacify the country by solving the Serb-Croat problem.

The following year questioned Uzunović the Regent advice and refused rapprochement with the opposition, leading to a revolt of some ministers and the collapse of the government. Regent Prince Paul declared that the Kingdom of Yugoslavia would join the Tripartite Pact on 25 March 1941 to avoid the same fate as Poland.

== Retirement and death ==
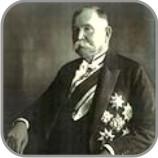
Nikola Uzunović with his honours and medals

Uzunović with his family

After leaving office in December 1934, he went into seclusion. During the Second World War, and Occupation of the Axis powers he refused to attach his name under the anticommunist petition of prominent Serbs. Nevertheless, after the war, most of his lands and property were appropriated by the state, including his Villa, which the government of Socialist Federal Republic of Yugoslavia donated to the United States, which owns it to this day.

Uzunović died on 19 July 1954 in Belgrade. However some sources suggest he died a year earlier in 1953.

== Honours ==
On 20 February 1927 Uzunović was awarded the Order of Polonia Restituta from the President of Poland Ignacy Mościcki.

Political offices
Preceded by Milan Stojadinović	Minister of Finance of Yugoslavia; 1926	Succeeded by Ninko Perić
Preceded by Nikola Pašić	Prime Minister of Yugoslavia; 1926–1927	Succeeded by Velimir Vukićević
Preceded by Milan Srškić	Prime Minister of Yugoslavia; 1934–1934	Succeeded by Bogoljub Jevtić
