= Petar Živković =

Serbian military officer (1879–1947)

- Петар Живковић
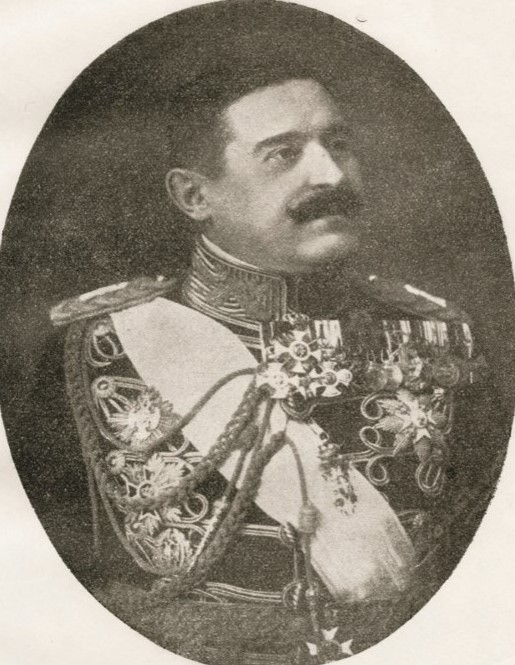

8th Prime Minister of Yugoslavia
- In office 7 January 1929 – 4 April 1932
- Monarch: Alexander I
- Preceded by: Anton Korošec
- Succeeded by: Vojislav Marinković

Minister of the Interior
- In office 7 January 1929 – 5 January 1932
- Prime Minister: Himself
- Preceded by: Anton Korošec
- Succeeded by: Milan Srškić

Minister of the Army and Navy of Yugoslavia
- In office 22 October 1934 – 7 March 1936
- Prime Minister: Nikola Uzunović (1934); Bogoljub Jevtić (1934–35); Milan Stojadinović (1935–36)
- Preceded by: Milan Milovanović
- Succeeded by: Ljubomir Marić

Minister without Portfolio
- In office 1943–1943/45
- Monarch: Peter II
- Preceded by: None
- Succeeded by: None

Personal details
- Born: 1 January 1879 Negotin, Serbia
- Died: 3 February 1947 (aged 68) Paris, France
- Party: Yugoslav Radical Peasants' Democracy; Yugoslav National Party

Military service
- Allegiance: Serbia / Yugoslavia
- Branch/service: Royal Serbian Army / Royal Yugoslav Army
- Years of service: 1903–1943
- Rank: General of the Army
- Battles/wars: World War I

Petar Živković (Serbian Cyrillic: Петар Живковић; 1 January 1879 – 3 February 1947) was a Serbian military officer and political figure in Yugoslavia. He was Prime Minister of the Kingdom of Yugoslavia from 7 January 1929 until 4 April 1932.

== Life ==
Petar Živković was born in Negotin, Principality of Serbia (present-day Bor District, Serbia) in 1879. He finished secondary school in Zajecar and the Military Academy in Belgrade. A soldier at the Serbian court, he helped overthrow the Obrenović dynasty with the assassination of King Alexander I of Serbia (11 June), which was orchestrated by Colonel Dragutin Dimitrijević, the founder and leading member of the secret nationalist organization Black Hand. Živković later founded the secret organization White Hand in 1912, which served to counter the power of the Black Hand.

In 1921, King Alexander I of Yugoslavia appointed Živković commander of the Royal Guard, but he was briefly demoted due to accusations by a young guardsman that he tried to seduce him. In 1929 he was appointed prime minister as part of the 6 January Dictatorship. General Živković was Bogoljub Jevtić's brother-in-law, the closest adviser to the head of State.

Živković held the office as a member of the Yugoslav Radical Peasants' Democracy (JRSD), which became the only legal party in Yugoslavia, following electoral reforms. As a prime minister he did not enjoy high regard by either the military or among other politicians not only due to his widely rumoured homosexuality. He resigned as prime minister in 1932, and shortly thereafter founded the Yugoslav National Party (JNS), becoming its president in 1936.

Following Alexander I assassination in 1934, His cousin Pavle Karađorđević took office as regent for the 11-year-old Petar II. Upon the signing of the Tripartite Pact on 27 March 1941, Živković left Yugoslavia ahead of the Nazi invasion. He became part of the Yugoslav government in exile.

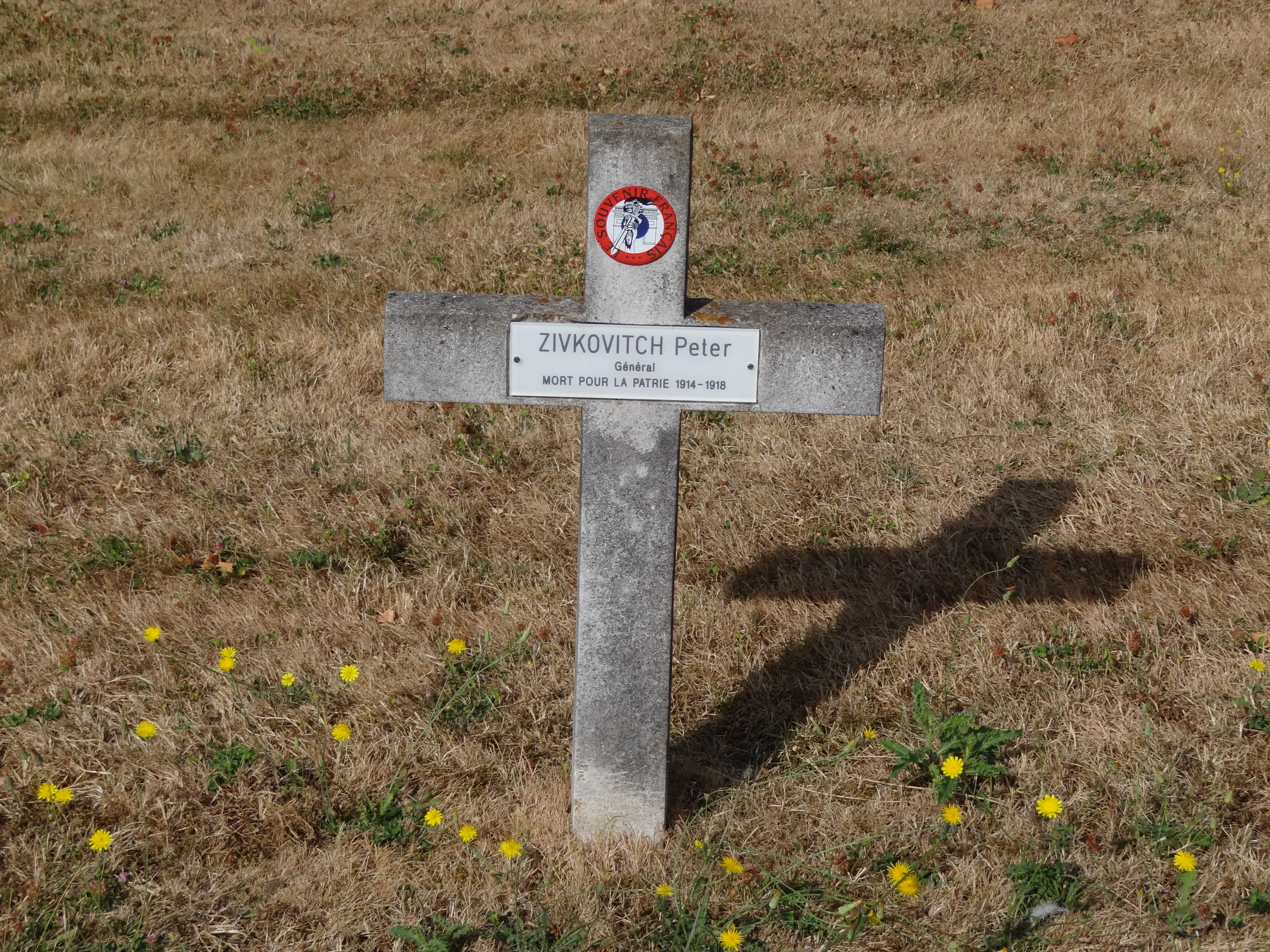
The grave of Petar Živković in the cimetière parisien de Thiais.

In 1946, he was tried in absentia in the Federal People's Republic of Yugoslavia at the Trial of Mihailović et al. and sentenced to death by the communist authorities. He was forced into exile, leaving for Italy and eventually settling in France, dying in Paris in February 1947, aged 68.

== In popular culture ==
Živković is portrayed by Nebojša Dugalić in the Serbian television series Balkan Shadows.

Political offices
Preceded by Anton Korošec	Prime Minister of Yugoslavia; 1929–1932	Succeeded by Vojislav Marinković
New office	Minister without Portfolio; 1943–1943/45	Abolished
Military offices
Preceded by Dušan Simović	Deputy Commander in Chief of the Yugoslavian Armed Forces; 1943	Succeeded by Position abolished
