= Milan Srškić =

Yugoslav politician and lawyer

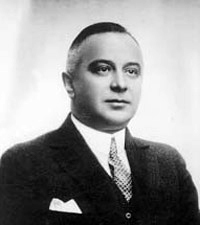

10th Prime Minister of Yugoslavia
- In office 3 July 1932 – 27 January 1934
- Monarch: Alexander I
- Preceded by: Vojislav Marinković
- Succeeded by: Nikola Uzunović

Minister of the Interior of Yugoslavia
- In office 5 January 1932 – 11 July 1932
- Preceded by: Milorad Vujičić
- Succeeded by: Nastas Petrović

Minister of Justice of Yugoslavia
- In office 1 February 1927 – 17 April 1927
- Preceded by: Marko Đuričić
- Succeeded by: Dušan Subotić

Personal details
- Born: 3 March 1880 Belgrade, Serbia
- Died: 12 April 1937 (aged 57) Belgrade, Yugoslavia
- Party: Yugoslav National Party

Milan Srškić (3 March 1880 – 12 April 1937) was a Yugoslav politician and lawyer, Prime Minister of the Kingdom of Yugoslavia during the dictatorship of King Alexander I.

Even before the establishment of the 6 January Dictatorship, Srškić had on the behalf of the palace worked to undermine and weaken his party, the People's Radical Party and he had fully backed the dictatorship from its inception - his promotion to Prime Minister represented a return to a more repressive regime after the loosening of control under his predecessor, Marinković.

Political offices
Preceded by Vojislav Marinković	Prime Minister of Yugoslavia; 1932–1934	Succeeded by Nikola Uzunović
