= Milan Stojadinović =

Serbian politician (1888–1961)

Dr. iur. Milan Stojadinović
- Милан Стојадиновић
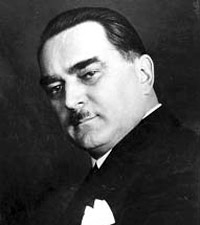

12th Prime Minister of Yugoslavia
- In office 24 June 1935 – 5 February 1939
- Monarchs: Peter II; Prince Paul (Regent, in the name of young King Peter II)
- Preceded by: Bogoljub Jevtić
- Succeeded by: Dragiša Cvetković

Foreign Minister of Yugoslavia
- In office 24 June 1935 – 5 February 1939
- Prime Minister: Himself
- Preceded by: Bogoljub Jevtić
- Succeeded by: Aleksandar Cincar-Marković

Finance Minister of Yugoslavia
- In office 22 December 1922 – 28 July 1924
- Prime Minister: Nikola Pašić
- Preceded by: Kosta Kumanudi
- Succeeded by: Mehmed Spaho
- In office 6 November 1924 – 8 April 1926
- Prime Minister: Nikola Pašić
- Preceded by: Mehmed Spaho
- Succeeded by: Nikola Uzunović (Acting)
- In office 22 December 1934 – 24 June 1935
- Prime Minister: Bogoljub Jevtić
- Preceded by: Milorad Đorđević
- Succeeded by: Marko Kožul

Personal details
- Born: 4 August 1888 Čačak, Kingdom of Serbia
- Died: 24 October 1961 (aged 73) Buenos Aires, Argentina
- Party: People's Radical Party; Yugoslav Radical Union; Serbian Radical Party

Milan Stojadinović (Serbian Cyrillic: Милан Стојадиновић; IPA: [ˈmǐlan ˈstɔjadǐːnɔv̞itɕ]; 4 August 1888 – 24 October 1961) was a Serbian and Yugoslav politician and economist who was the Prime Minister of Yugoslavia from 1935 to 1939. He also was Foreign Minister from 1935 to 1939 and as Finance Minister three times (1922–1924, 1924–1926, 1934–1935).

== Early life ==
Milan Stojadinović was born on 4 August 1888 in the Serbian town of Čačak. His father, Mihailo, was a municipal judge who relocated to Belgrade in 1904. It was here that the young Stojadinović finished his secondary education and became a sympathizer of the Serbian Social Democratic Party (SSDP). Later, he came to believe that the liberation of ethnic Serbs who lived in the Austro-Hungarian and Ottoman empires was more important than bridging the gap between the upper and lower classes, and followed in his father's footsteps by joining the People's Radical Party (NRS) of Nikola Pašić.

In the summer of 1906, Stojadinović was sent to Austria to learn German as a reward for successfully completing secondary school. While there, he fell under the influence of South Slavic youth movements and became a supporter of Yugoslav unity. He later returned to Serbia and began his studies at the University of Belgrade Faculty of Law, specializing in economics and finance. He spent three years studying abroad, staying in Munich and Potsdam during the 1910–11 school year, Paris between 1911 and 1912, and London between 1912 and 1913. Stojadinović's stay in Germany had a profound effect on his economic views and led him to write a doctoral dissertation on the country's budget. He was greatly influenced by the German historical school of economics, which argued that economic policies should be developed according to the specific economic and cultural conditions prevalent in a society rather than being based on a universal model.

== Economist ==
Stojadinović's competence as an economist became evident during the Balkan Wars of 1912 and 1913 and during World War I, when he began working in the Serbian Ministry of Finance. Following the Serbian Army's retreat through Albania during the winter of 1915, he withdrew with the Serbian government-in-exile to the Greek island of Corfu. He stayed there between 1916 and 1918 and distinguished himself as a financial expert by helping to stabilize the Serbian dinar.

Stojadinović met his future wife Augusta – a woman of mixed Greek-German heritage – during his stay in Corfu. The two settled in Belgrade following the war. Stojadinović was appointed assistant manager of a local branch of the English Commercial Bank in 1919, but resigned as director-general of the State Accounts Board of the newly formed Kingdom of Serbs, Croats and Slovenes because of disagreements with the government of Prime Minister Ljubomir Davidović and his Democratic Party. He lectured economics at the University of Belgrade from 1920 to 1921, but quickly gave up on academia.

== Finance Minister ==
Stojadinović became the Minister of Finance in 1922, aged only 34. He began writing for the Belgrade daily Politika and the English-language weekly The Economist. Following the proclamation of a royal dictatorship by King Alexander I in 1929, he sided with a faction of the NRS that opposed the royal dictatorship. The Radical Party broke into two in 1929, with the largest faction supporting King Alexander's dictatorship and Stojadinović joining the opposition faction headed by the party's Main Committee.

Despite being suspected of opposition to the monarchy, he was once again appointed to the position of Finance Minister in the government of Bogoljub Jevtić, who became prime minister following Alexander's assassination in Marseille in October 1934. By this point, Stojadinović was the vice-president of the Belgrade Stock Exchange, chairman of a river navigation company, and the director of a British-owned broadcasting station and a British-owned shipbuilding company. Despite clear evidence, presented by Yugoslavia, that Italy and Hungary were behind the assassination of King Alexander, the League of Nations failed to take action against either of those countries, convincing Stojadinović that the League was useless.

== Prime minister ==
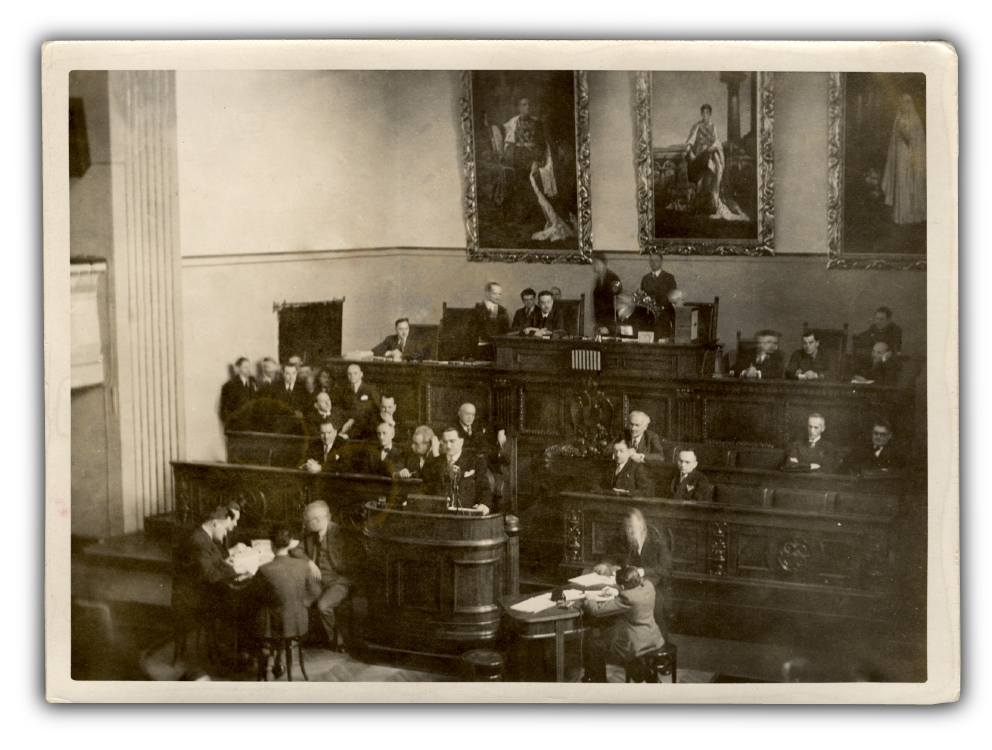
Milan Stojadinovic speaking during National Assembly session in 1936

In 1935, he became the leader of the Serbian Radical Party, which with some other parties formed a coalition Jugoslovenska Radikalna Zajednica (Yugoslav Radical Union, JRZ) and won the elections. The JRZ was made of the Serb Radicals, the Slovene People's Party led by Father Anton Korošec and the Yugoslav Muslim Organization led by Mehmed Spaho, which Stojadinović called a "three-legged chair" that was missing a "fourth leg", namely the support of the Croats. Stojadinović wrote in his memoirs: "I called our party the three-legged chair, on which it was possible to sit when necessary, although a chair with four legs is far more stable". On 24 June 1935 he was elected prime minister and Minister of Foreign Affairs. He survived an assassination attempt by Damjan Arnautović, a school teacher, in 1935. The Regent for the boy king Peter II, the Prince Regent Paul, appointed Stojadinović Prime Minister partly because he was regarded as a financial expert who could deal with the effects of the Great Depression, and partly because Stojadinović was believed capable of making a deal with Croat politicians to resolve whether Yugoslavia was to be a federation or a unitary state. One of Stojadinović's first acts was to loosen censorship on the press and to free 10,000 political prisoners. Through the JRZ Stojadinović had a submissive skupshtina (parliament), but the JRZ never became the mass movement that Stojadinović had envisioned.

=== Domestic issues ===
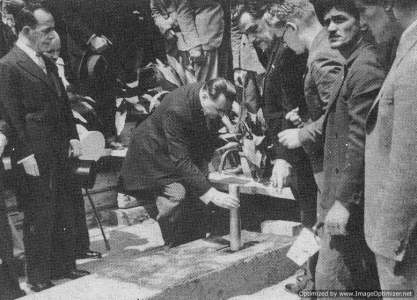
Milan Stojadinović laid the foundation stone for the building of the Faculty of Law in Belgrade in 1937

The British historian Richard Crampton wrote that the basis of Stojadinović's power was "political jobbery" and corruption as the JRZ functioned more as a patronage machine of a type common to the Balkans rather than the fascistic mass movement that Stojadinović had intended. Interwar Yugoslavia was characterized by an etatist economic system with the state playing a large role in the economy. The Yugoslav state owned all or most of the railroads, docks, mines, steel mills, forests, mills, hospitals, banks, publishing houses, hotels, theatres and opera houses in the country, together with the state having monopolies over the manufacturing, distribution and sales of matches, salt, cigarette paper, tobacco and kerosene. As public-sector jobs were better paid than those in the private sector, and presented more opportunities for corruption, there was much competition for jobs in the public sector, especially in a country as poor as Yugoslavia, enabling any party in power to build support by handing out public-sector jobs in exchange for votes. Every government in interwar Yugoslavia used patronage to reward its supporters with public-sector jobs and punish its enemies by denying them the chance to work in the public sector. Stojadinović, like his predecessors, created a patronage machine as the basis of his power with JRZ members being rewarded with employment in the public sector. Moreover, the gradual improvement of the Yugoslav economy in the late 1930s, as it recovered from its 1932 nadir, won Stojadinović a further measure of popularity. Stojadinović believed that the solution to the Great Depression lay in closer economic links with Germany, which lacked many raw materials necessary for a modern industrial economy and whose population exceeded the capacity of German farmers to feed it. Yugoslav exports of both food and raw materials such as iron, bauxite, copper and manganese to Germany fueled Yugoslav economic growth after 1935 and placed Yugoslavia in the German economic sphere of influence.

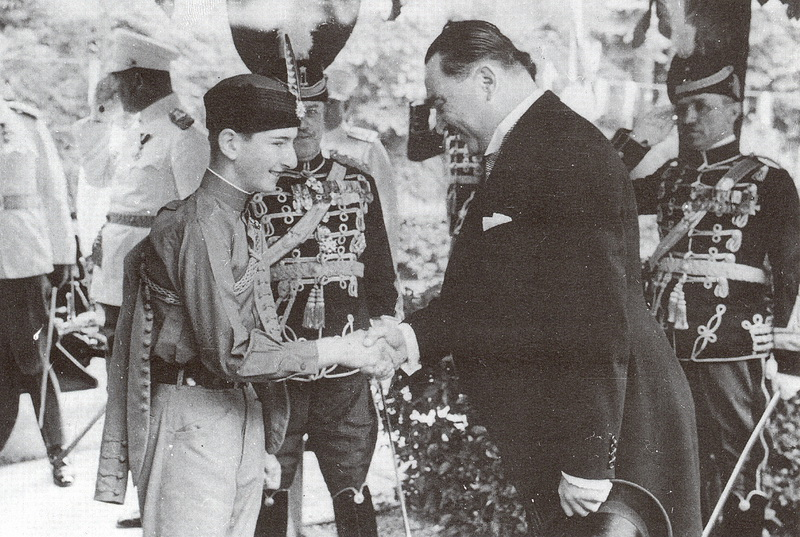
Stojadinović with King Peter II of Yugoslavia

The Prince regent had hoped that Stojadinović would make overtures to the Croats, but Stojadinović's unwillingness to discuss federalisation of Yugoslavia presented major difficulties to this end. As part of an attempt to reach out to the Croats, Stojadinović signed a concordat with the Vatican in 1935. Stojadinović hoped that the Concordat would incline the Catholic Church would use its influence with Croat voters in favor of the JRZ, but opposition from the Serbian Orthodox Church led Stojadinović to delay the Concordat's submission for ratification. In another concession to the Croats, Stojadinović allowed the erection of a statue of the assassinated Croat politician Stjepan Radić in Zagreb, and allowed Croats who had gone into exile under King Alexander to return, including the son-in-law of Radić who had once called for Croatian independence. Though in theory a supporter of economic liberalism, in practice Stojadinović favored an etatist economic policy, arguing that the state should intervene to end the Great Depression.

=== Diplomacy ===
Stojadinović recognized the military threats from Nazi Germany, Fascist Italy and surrounding countries as imminent. From the beginning of his prime-ministership, Stojadinović sought closer ties with Germany despite Yugoslavia's traditional friendship with France. In late 1935, Stojadinović appointed a well known Germanophile as the Yugoslav minister in Berlin to replace the former minister who had a more critical attitude towards the Reich. Even before the remilitarization of the Rhineland, Yugoslavia under Stojadinović was moving towards a pro-German foreign policy. In 1935, Yugoslavia observed the sanctions that the League of Nations imposed on Italy, which hurt the Yugoslav economy, and Stojadinović signed his first economic treaty with Germany at the same time. In February 1936, Stojadinović welcomed King Boris III of Bulgaria to Belgrade, marking the beginning of Yugoslav-Bulgarian rapprochement as Stojadinović wanted more friendly relations with Sofia to settle the "Macedonian Question" which poisoned Yugoslav-Bulgarian relations in the interwar period.

Yugoslavia had signed a treaty of alliance with France in 1927, when France still occupied the Rhineland, and during Franco-Yugoslav staff talks, it was promised that France would take the offensive into western Germany if Germany should start another war. As long as the Rhineland remained demilitarized, there was always the possibility of a French offensive into western Germany, which reassured Yugoslavia. Weinberg wrote that the demilitarized status of the Rhineland the treaty of Versailles had imposed was "...the single most important guarantee of peace in Europe," for, as long as the Rhineland was demilitarized, it was impossible for Germany to attack any of France's allies in Eastern Europe without exposing itself to the risk of a devastating French offensive into western Germany. The remilitarization of the Rhineland on 7 March 1936 enabled Germany to start building the West Wall along its border with France, ending any hope of a French offensive into western Germany. From the Yugoslav viewpoint, the remilitarization of the Rhineland and the construction of the West Wall meant that Germany could now launch offensives into eastern Europe without fear of France, which led Stojadinović to break with the traditional pro-French foreign policy of Yugoslavia and to seek an understanding with the Reich. On 15–20 June 1936, the chiefs of staff of the Little Entente (Romania, Czechoslovakia and Yugoslavia) met in Bucharest to discuss their plans now that the Rhineland was re-militarized. The gloomy conclusion of the Bucharest meeting was that France was not a factor in Eastern Europe, and henceforward there were only two great powers in Eastern Europe, namely the Soviet Union and Germany, and the victory of either in another war would mean the end of their independence. Stojadinović worked increasingly toward a goal of neutrality like that of Switzerland. Examples of his work to that end were the non-aggression treaty with Italy and Yugoslavia's extension of its treaty of friendship with France.

The policies pursued by Fascist Italy towards Yugoslavia were usually hostile, but starting in 1936, Benito Mussolini made a major effort to persuade Yugoslavia to renounce its alliance with France. After the election of the Popular Front government of Léon Blum in France, Italian foreign policy turned anti-French, and Mussolini as part of his anti-French strategy wanted to detach Yugoslavia from the cordon sanitaire as Yugoslavia was the only one of France's eastern European allies that bordered Italy. Mussolini also had plans to annex Albania and to use it as a base to conquer Greece, which was allied to Yugoslavia in the Balkan Pact, making an alliance with Belgrade useful from his viewpoint. Mussolini had expected the assassination of King Alexander in 1934, which he financed, to cause a civil war between the different peoples of Yugoslavia, which in turn would allow the Italians to seize the parts of Yugoslavia that they had long coveted. The assassination of Alexander on 9 October 1934 while on a state visit to France did not cause the expected civil war, showing Mussolini that Yugoslavia was more stable than he thought, causing him to temporarily abandon his plans against that country, and inclining him instead to work for a rapprochement with Belgrade, which Stojadinović welcomed. From 1936 onward, there were increasing signs that Italy and Germany were putting aside their differences on the "Austrian Question," with Mussolini proclaiming in a speech in Milan in October 1936 that there was now a "Berlin-Rome axis" in Europe. The existence of the "Berlin-Rome axis" ended whatever hopes the Yugoslavs might have had of playing off Italy against Germany.

=== Balkan relations ===
In October 1936, while on his way back from Istanbul, Stojadinović stayed at Kricim Castle, the rural residence of King Boris. During his stay there, Stojadinović agreed to a friendship treaty. Under the terms of the Balkan Pact, approval by the other members was required if any member wanted to sign a treaty with another Balkan state. Stojadinović faced little opposition from Turkey, but both Romania and Greece objected strenuously, believing that Yugoslavia was deserting the alliance, and only reluctantly gave permission in January 1937. Romania and Greece assented only when Stojadinović threatened to sign the pact without their permission, which would have broken up the Balkan Pact.

In late 1936, Stojadinović sabotaged a French effort to strengthen the Little Entente of Czechoslovakia, Romania and Yugoslavia, the terms of which the Quai d'Orsay sought to change to require united action to oppose aggression by any state, not just Hungary. Both King Carol II of Romania and President Edvard Beneš of Czechoslovakia supported the French proposal, and Stojadinović was the lone holdout who refused to discuss amending the treaty which created the Little Entente. Stojadinović explained later to a French envoy that Yugoslavia was now so deeply entrenched in Germany's economic sphere of influence that he simply could not risk a war with the Reich, Yugoslavia's largest trading partner and investor. Germany itself did not even see any need for an alliance with Belgrade, as it expected economic interests alone to make Yugoslavia Germany's de facto ally. By 1938, 60% of Yugoslavia's trade was with Germany, making the Reich Yugoslavia's largest trading partner, with Germany importing bauxite, copper, and manganese to aid its preparations for war, while most consumer goods and capital equipment in Yugoslavia were German imports.

On 24 January 1937, Stojadinović signed the friendship pact with Bulgaria. Although the pact said little more than that the peoples of Yugoslavia and Bulgaria would henceforward live together in peace and friendship, Stojadinović and his Bulgarian counterpart Georgi Kyoseivanov informally agreed that Bulgaria would cease making claims on Yugoslav Macedonia in exchange for which Stojadinović would support Bulgarian claims against Greece. Stojadinović wanted much of Greek Macedonia for Yugoslavia, especially the port city of Thessaloniki, and the purpose of the friendship pact was to lay the basis of a Yugoslav-Bulgarian alliance against Greece. At the time of the signing, Stojadinović and Kyoseivanov agreed that Alexandroupoli would go to Bulgaria while Yugoslavia would take Thessaloniki. As Bulgaria was an ally of Italy by virtue of Boris' marriage to Princess Giovanna, daughter of King Victor Emmanuel III of Italy, improving relations with Sofia fitted in with Stojadinović's plans to improve relations with Rome. Stojadinović intended to end the problem of Ustasha terrorism in Croatia by a rapprochement with Italy that would cause the Italians to cease supporting the Ustasha, which would help with his plans to settle the "Croat question".

=== Croatia ===
In January 1937, Stojadinović met with Vladko Maček of the Croatian Peasant Party. Stojadinović rejected Maček's demands for a federation, and instead preferred that Maček establish ties with Serbian opposition leaders to divide Yugoslav politics into two blocs that would transcend ethnicity, language and religion. One bloc would be a federalist bloc, the other unitarist, a dichotomy Stojadinović saw as the solution to Yugoslavia's problems of unity as it would create pan-Yugoslav ties that would ultimately weaken the prevailing ties of language, ethnicity and religion. Stojadinović tried to make himself the "national" leader of the Serbs in a way comparable to how Maček was viewed as the "national" leader of the Croats, Father Korošec as the "national" leader of the Slovenes and Spaho as the "national" leader of the Bosnian Muslims, but the heterogeneous values of the Serb voters caused the failure of his bid to be the Serb "national leader". That the Serbs were the largest ethnic group in Yugoslavia meant that Serb voters did not feel the need to rally around a single "national" leader as did Yugoslavia's smaller ethnicities, who, feeling more embattled and threatened than Serbs, each tended to vote for a single party.

=== Negotiations with the Axis powers ===
In March 1937, Stojadinović told Raymond Brugère, the French minister in Belgrade, that France was secure behind the Maginot Line, but the construction of the West Wall meant that the French Army would probably stay behind the Maginot Line if Germany should attack any of France's allies in Eastern Europe, which led him to conclude that Yugoslavia must not "provoke" Germany. Without informing France, Czechoslovakia or Romania, Stojadinović opened negotiations in the winter of 1936–37 for an Italo-Yugoslav treaty intended to resolve all of the outstanding problems between the two countries. On 25 March 1937, the Italian foreign minister, Count Galeazzo Ciano, arrived in Belgrade to sign the treaty alongside Stojadinović. Under the terms of the Italo-Yugoslav treaty, Italy promised to rein in the Ustasha, respect the borders of Yugoslavia, and accept Yugoslavia's membership in the Little Entente, the League of Nations and the Balkan pact in exchange for which Yugoslavia accepted Albania as being in the Italian sphere of influence. Although Stojadinović did not formally repudiate the alliance with France or the Little Entente, the Italo-Yugoslav treaty brought Yugoslavia much closer to the Axis powers, did much to weaken its existing alliances, and brought a definitive end to the French effort to strengthen the Little Entente. American historian Gerhard Weinberg summarized the effects of the Italo-Yugoslav treaty: "Having signed with Italy, he [Stojadinović] could hardly be expected to sign an agreement with France that was designed to protect Yugoslavia against her new associate. Conversely, he could not promise to assist Czechoslovakia against Germany, Italy's Axis partner. Stojadinović could, therefore, now safely assure the Germans that there would be no Yugoslav assistance pact with France".

The attempted Concordat with the Holy See caused severe protests from the Serbian Orthodox Church in 1937 and thus never came into effect. When the Concordat came up for ratification by the skupshtina on 23 July 1937, protests broke out overnight in Belgrade by Orthodox priests who called the concordat a sell-out to the Roman Catholic Church. The very night that the parliament was holding the vote to ratify the Concordat, the Patriarch Varnava of the Serbian Orthodox Church died, which Orthodox faithful saw as a sign that God disapproved of the Concordat. That the Patriarch died the same night caused an immense backlash against the Concordat among the Serbs, and the Orthodox Church announced that all Orthodox deputies in the skupshtina who voted for the Concordat were now penalised. Stojadinović withdrew the Concordat in a bid to save his popularity with the Serbs, damaging his own reputation among Croats as a fair-minded negotiator and prompting Maček to accuse him of dealing in bad faith. Thus, the failed Concordat cost Stojadinović popular support in both Croatia and Serbia. In October 1937, Maček signed an accord called the Bloc of National Agreement which brought together his own Croatian Peasant Party with the anti-Stojadinović faction of the Serb Radicals, the Democrats, the Agrarian Party and the Independent Democrats. By this time, despite the economic upturn, Stojadinović was widely unpopular owing to rampant corruption within his government. British novelist Rebecca West who went to Yugoslavia in 1937 to research her book Black Lamb and Grey Falcon reported that ordinary people had told her that Stojadinović was "a tyrant and enemy of freedom" who was "hated throughout the length and breadth of the land" amidst rumors that Stojadinović and his associates were looting the public treasury. In December 1937, Stojadinović visited Rome to meet Benito Mussolini and his son-in-law, the Foreign Minister, Count Galeazzo Ciano, both of whom he regarded as friends. Ciano wrote in his diary that Stojadinović: "...liked the Mussolini formula: strength and consensus. King Alexander had only strength. S[tojadinović] wants to popularize his dictatorship". Ciano reciprocated Stojadinović's admiration of Fascist Italy, writing in his diary he is "our sincere friend... a strong, full-blooded man with a resonant laugh and a strong handshake... a man who inspires confidence... Of all the political men I have encountered so far in my European wanderings, he is the one I find the most interesting". Although Stojadinović brought along his wife, Ciano arranged parties "with the most beautiful women of Rome society", knowing that Stojadinović was a womanizer who took many of the Roman beauties he met to his bed.

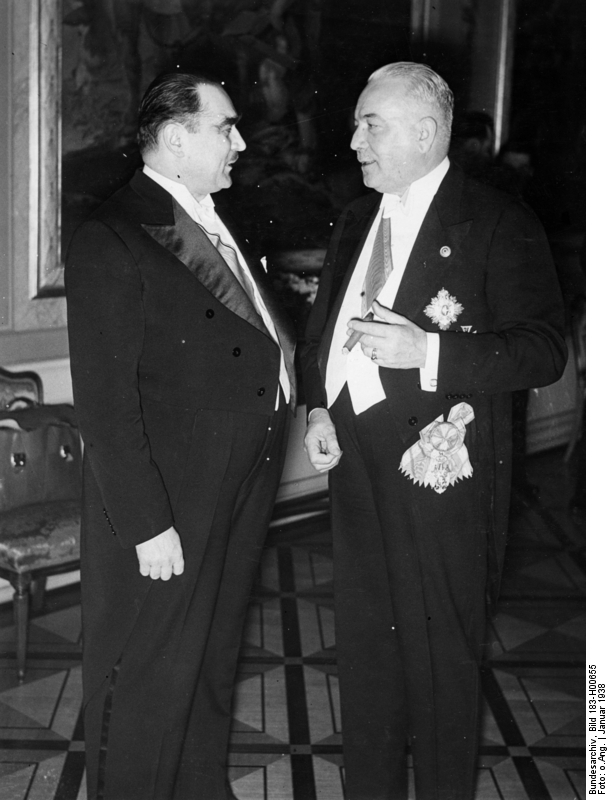
Stojadinović with German Foreign Minister Konstantin von Neurath in January 1938 during his visit to Berlin

Under the Little Entente of 1921, Yugoslavia was obligated to go to war if Hungary attacked either Czechoslovakia or Romania. In January 1938, Stojadinović visited Germany to meet Adolf Hitler, assuring him that he was a personal admirer of der Führer who wanted much closer German-Yugoslav ties. Hitler assured Stojadinović that, as long as he continued his pro-German policies, Germany not only would never attack Yugoslavia, but would also not support Hungary's claims against Yugoslavia. Stojadinović promised Hitler that Yugoslavia would accept any Anschluss with Austria as Yugoslavia regarded the question of annexing Austria as an "internal" German matter. Stojadinović stated that Yugoslavia had always enjoyed good relations with Germany except when it viewed the Reich through "somebody's else spectacles" (a reference to France), leading Hitler to say that Germany no longer viewed Yugoslavia "through Viennese spectacles".

Stojadinović's remarks during his visit to Berlin led to an explosive meeting with Raymond Brugère, the French minister upon his return to Belgrade. Brugère was a bumptious character who did not always follow the niceties of diplomacy. Brugère confronted Stojadinović, expressing "astonishment" about his statements in Berlin, leading to charge that Stojadinović was abandoning Yugoslavia's friends for its enemies. Stojadinović who did not want to end the alliance with France responded by saying maintaining the alliance with France remained a "fundamental" element of his foreign policy, leading Brugère to demand proof of such intentions. Brugère demanded that staff-level talks between the Yugoslav and French armies resume and that that Yugoslavia start buying French arms again, saying that as far as he was concerned Yugoslavia was a French ally only in word, not deed.

In 1938, Germany was planning to attack Czechoslovakia and Mussolini, in a bid to assist Hitler, worked to detach Yugoslavia from the Little Entente. In June 1938, Stojadinović met with Count Ciano and promised him that Yugoslavia would do nothing if Germany attacked Czechoslovakia. In return, Stojadinović asked that the Italians use their influence with the Hungarians to keep Hungary from attacking Czechoslovakia, saying the Little Entente was directed against Hungary, and as long as Hungary remained neutral, so would Yugoslavia. After the Munich Agreement, Stojadinović appeared quite comfortable with the idea of Germany as the hegemonic power in Eastern Europe, and German-Yugoslav relations had improved so much that in late 1938, Stojadinović began talks about buying weapons from Germany for Yugoslavia. Stojadinović started to call himself vodja, Serbo-Croatian for "leader", but stopped doing so because its resemblance to the Serbo-Croatian word for "devil," djavo, led his opponents to mock JRZ supporters for hailing the "devil". Furthermore, Stojadinović's use of the title "the leader" led the Prince Regent Paul to doubt his loyalty to King Peter II.

=== Replacement ===
A day before the elections on 11 December 1938, Stojadinović told a group of Belgrade journalists that the JRZ's platform was "One King, one nation, one state, prosperity at home, peace on the borders". During the election, Stojadinović presented himself as a strongman, with campaign pamphlets that proclaimed the slogan "one king, one nation, one state" and that featured photographs of Stojadinović giving speeches to uniformed followers. In late 1938 he was re-elected, albeit with a smaller margin than expected. As Stojadinović had failed to pacify the Croats, had raised a legion of uniformed followers ('Green Shirts'), and had no clear political programme, the regent Paul saw fit to replace Stojadinović, on 5 February 1939, with Dragiša Cvetković. Prince Paul had by early 1939 come to see the ambitious Stojadinović, with his fascist pretensions, as a threat to his own power.

The Prince Regent then went further, detaining Stojadinović without proper cause and eventually exiling him on 17 March 1941, possibly with help from King George VI of the UK (who had been the Prince Regent's best man in 1923), to the British Crown colony of Mauritius, where he was kept during World War II. By this point, Paul favored exile as he feared Stojadinović could be the focus of a pro-Axis coup directed from Berlin. Paul wanted to ensure that there was no alternative leadership in Belgrade through which the Axis powers could make a deal. British prime minister Winston Churchill justified interning Stojadinović in Mauritius as he was a "potential Quisling and an enemy".

== Emigration ==
In 1946, Stojadinović went to Rio de Janeiro, and then to Buenos Aires, where he was reunited with his wife and two daughters. Stojadinović spent the rest of his life as presidential advisor on economic and financial affairs to governments in Argentina and founded the financial newspaper El Economista. Stojadinović was close to the Argentine president Juan Perón to whom he was an economic adviser. The affluent lifestyle of Stojadinović in Buenos Aires suggested that the rumors of personal corruption on his part during his time as prime minister were well founded. In 1954, Stojadinović met with Ante Pavelić, the former Poglavnik of the Independent State of Croatia (NDH) who also lived in Buenos Aires, and agreed to cooperate with him on the creation of two independent and enlarged Croatian and Serbian states. Since Pavelić's regime during World War II had killed between 300,000 and 500,000 Serbs, Stojadinović's willingness to work with Pavelić largely discredited him both in Yugoslavia and among the Serb diaspora overseas. The Ustasha campaign against the Serbs in World War II is viewed by the Serbs as well as scholars as an act of genocide, and photographs of Stojadinović shaking hands with Pavelić ruined whatever was left of his good reputation. He died in 1961. Stojadinović's memoirs, titled Neither War, Nor Pact (Ni rat, ni pakt), were posthumously published in Buenos Aires in 1963 and were re-printed in Rijeka in 1970.

== See also ==
- List of Finance Ministers of the Kingdom of Yugoslavia

== Notes ==
Government offices
Preceded by Kosta Kumanudi	Minister of Finance of Yugoslavia; 1917–1918	Succeeded by Mehmed Spaho
Preceded by Nikola Pašić	Minister of Finance of Yugoslavia; 1922–1924	Succeeded by Mehmed Spaho
Preceded by Bogoljub Jevtić	Minister of Finance of Yugoslavia; 1924–1926	Succeeded by Milorad Đorđević
Preceded by Bogoljub Jevtić	Prime Minister of Yugoslavia; 1935–1939	Succeeded by Dragiša Cvetković
Preceded by Bogoljub Jevtić	Foreign Affairs Minister of the Kingdom of Serbs, Croats and Slovenes; 1935–1939	Succeeded by Aleksandar Cincar-Marković
