= 1931 Yugoslav Constitution =

The 1931 Yugoslav Constitution, also known as the September Constitution or Octroyed constitution, was the second and final Constitution of the Kingdom of Yugoslavia. Alexander I of Yugoslavia issued the constitution by decree on 3 September 1931.

== Background ==
Article 76 of the Constitution bans possession of firearms within Parliament while it is in session, likely as a response to the fatal shooting by Puniša Račić of several members of the Croatian Peasant Party in 1928. Tumult following the assassination led to the establishment of the 6 January Dictatorship in 1929, under which the previous Vidovdan Constitution was abrogated.

== Structure ==
The Constitution consists of twelve chapters comprising 120 articles.

=== Parts ===
Chapter 1: General Provisions

Defines Yugoslavia as a constitutional monarchy, establishes the Yugoslavian coat of arms and official language.

Chapter 2: Elementary Rights and Duties of the Citizen

Provides the rights of equal protection, petition, and trial, freedom of religion, freedom of speech, and freedom of association, bans exile and unreasonable search and seizure, and provides for free, compulsory primary education.

Chapter 3: Social and Economic Provisions

Guarantees property rights, permits eminent domain with just compensation, allows the State to intervene in labour market "in a spirit of justice".

Chapter 4: The Powers of the State

Divides executive, legislative, and judicial powers; King owns executive power and shares legislative with a bicameral Parliament.

Chapter 5: The King

King is head of state and commander-in-chief, and holds the right of pardon and the right to dissolve Parliament with approval of Council of Ministers. Provisions for majority and inheritance.

Chapter 6: The Regency

If the king is incapacitated or a minor, his power is exercised by a regency consisting of his heir, if eligible, or three pre-appointed regents, if not.

Chapter 7: Parliament

Bicameral legislature: Senate with appointed and directly elected members, six-year terms, directly elected Chamber of Deputies with four-year terms. Near-universal suffrage for males at least 21. Bills introduced by King or one-fifth of either house, promulgated by King and Council of Ministers.

Chapter 8: The Executive Power

Establishes borders of the nine banovinas. King appoints and dismisses Ministers and Bans, who are supreme governors of their respective banovinas.

Chapter 9: The Judicial Power

Civil matters among Muslims are decided by sharia judges. Establishes life tenure.

Chapter 10: Finances and Domain of the State

Parliament passes annual budgets. Minister of Finance administers State property.

Chapter 11: The Army

Size of the Army determined in budget process. Civilian request necessary for Army to maintain domestic order. Establishes military courts.

Chapter 12: Modifications of the Constitution

Amendment process: King dismisses Parliament and calls for elections; newly elected Parliament must pass amendments by a vote of three-fifths of both houses. All laws but that establishing the 6 January Dictatorship remain in force.

== Duration ==
The force of the Constitution ended with the invasion of Yugoslavia by the Axis powers, which began on 6 April 1941 and ended with the unconditional surrender of the Royal Yugoslav Army on 17 April, after which Yugoslavia was partitioned and annexed by the invading powers. Peter II fled to England. In 1944 the Prime Minister of his government-in-exile signed the Treaty of Vis, which promised a coalition Royalist-Partisan government after World War II. Irregular elections to a constituent assembly on 11 November 1945 produced a great majority for the Communist Party. The 1946 Yugoslav Constitution it produced abolished the monarchy and superseded the 1931 Constitution.
