= Yugoslav National Party =

Yugoslav National Party Jugoslavenska nacionalna stranka Југославенска национална странка
- Leaders: Petar Živković; Nikola Uzunović; Milan Srškić; Bogoljub Jevtić
- Founder: Petar Živković
- Founded: 1929; 97 years ago
- Dissolved: 1941; 85 years ago
- Split from: People's Radical Party
- Headquarters: Belgrade, Yugoslavia
- Ideology: Yugoslav nationalism Monarchism
- Political position: Right-wing

The Yugoslav National Party (Serbo-Croatian: Jugoslavenska nacionalna stranka, Југославенска национална странка, JNS; Slovene: Jugoslovanska nacionalna stranka), established as Yugoslav Radical Peasants' Democracy (Serbo-Croatian: Jugoslavenska radikalna seljačka demokratija; Slovene: Jugoslovanska radikalno-kmečka demokracija), was the sole-ruling party of Yugoslavia during the period of royal authoritarian dictatorship from 1929 to 1931.

== History ==
=== Dictatorship ===
On 6 January 1929, the king dissolved the Parliament and abolished the constitution, and banning all political parties. This became known as the 6 January Dictatorship. In 1931, a new constitution was put into place, which provided for limited democracy. However, most of the political power remained in the hands of the King and the government, appointed by him.

=== 1930s ===
In May 1932, the Yugoslav Radical Peasants' Democracy was established to support Alexander's government, under the leadership of Petar Živković. It was formed mostly by dissident members of the Democratic Party and the People's Radical Party (NRS), as well as the Slovenian section of the Independent Democratic Party (SDS) and the right wing of the Slovene Peasant Party (SKS). Individual members from other parties, and from nationalist organizations like ORJUNA also joined. In June 1933, it was renamed to Yugoslav National Party, and adopted a program stressing the unity of the Yugoslav Nation, centralized government and secularism.

=== Governing party ===
From 1932 to 1935, the party was the governing party of Yugoslavia. Petar Živković, Milan Srškić and Nikola Uzunović were the country's prime ministers while the party was in power. After King Alexander was assassinated in 1934, the party remained in power. However, the economic and political instability of the country, and fierce opposition from Croat parties challenged the party's power. Elections were called in 1935; although they were not free, the JNS suffered a serious setback.

=== Reformed party ===
A former member of the Yugoslav National Party Milan Stojadinović formed a successor party, called Yugoslav Radical Union (JRZ), based on a more conservative political alliance, which included the Yugoslav Muslim Organization (JMO) and Slovene People's Party (SLS). The Yugoslav National Party went into opposition, where it remained until 1941.
