= Velimir Vukićević =

Serbian Yugoslav politician

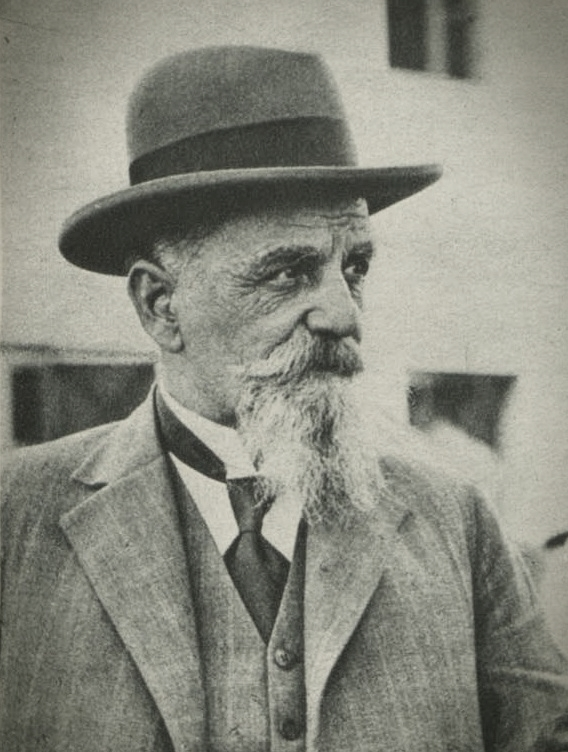

6th Prime Minister of Yugoslavia
- In office 17 April 1927 – 28 July 1928
- Monarch: Alexander I
- Preceded by: Nikola Uzunović
- Succeeded by: Anton Korošec

Personal details
- Born: 11 July 1871; Oparić, Principality of Serbia
- Died: 27 November 1930 (aged 59); Belgrade, Kingdom of Yugoslavia
- Citizenship: Yugoslav
- Political party: People's Radical Party

Velimir Vukićević (11 July 1871 – 27 November 1930) was a Serbian Yugoslav politician. He served as Prime Minister of Yugoslavia from 17 April 1927 until 28 July 1928. After the parliamentary election on 11 September 1927 he was re-elected.

Velimir Vukićević was a middle school teacher by profession. Elected to Serbian National Assembly. He was a minister in several of the governments of Nikola Pašić but as one of the chief "Palace Radicals" his role was help Alexander, the king, to clip Pašić's wings.

His term was marked by an exceptional lack of ethnic tension in Croatia but as the cause was the political alliance of the leading Croat politician Stjepan Radić and the leading Croatian Serb politician Svetozar Pribićević in a united opposition to the government, this was a very unwelcome development for the government. Vukićević put pressure on papers dependent on government subsidy to launch a violent campaign against the opposition. Vukicevic resigned shortly after violence among members of Parliament in which three Croatian members of Parliament were killed.

Political offices
Preceded by Nikola Uzunović	Prime Minister of Yugoslavia; 1927–1928	Succeeded by Anton Korošec
