= Yugoslav Radical Union =

Yugoslav Radical Union Југословенска радикална заједница Jugoslovenska radikalna zajednica
- Chairman: Milan Stojadinović; Dragiša Cvetković
- Founder: Milan Stojadinović
- Founded: 1934; 91 years ago
- Dissolved: 1941; 84 years ago
- Split from: Yugoslav National Party
- Headquarters: Belgrade
- Paramilitary wing: Greenshirts
- Ideology: Yugoslav fascism: Yugoslav nationalism; Corporate statism; National conservatism
- Political position: Far-right
- Colours: Black Green

Party flag

The Yugoslav Radical Union (Serbian Cyrillic: Југословенска радикална заједница; Slovene: Jugoslovanska radikalna skupnost; Croatian: Jugoslavenska radikalna zajednica; abbreviated JRZ) was the ruling far-right party of Yugoslavia from 1934 until 1939.

The party, whose agenda was based on fascism, was the dominant political movement in the country until 1939, when Milan Stojadinović was removed as prime minister. Party members wore green shirt uniforms and šajkača caps, and they addressed Stojadinović as Vođa 'Leader'.

The party also had a paramilitary wing called the Greenshirts, who assaulted and clashed with those who were against Stojadinović's rule. Stojadinović told Italian foreign minister Galeazzo Ciano that, although the party had initially been established as a moderate authoritarian movement, his intention was to model the party after the Italian National Fascist Party.

Milan Stojadinović led the party until 1939 when his second cabinet collapsed due to his pro-Axis policy. He was replaced by Dragiša Cvetković as prime minister and de jure party leader. The party practically ceased to exist with the formation of the Cvetković–Maček government in 1939, although JRZ was not formally abolished or dissolved.

== See also ==
- Organization of Yugoslav Nationalists (ORJUNA)
- Yugoslav National Movement (ZBOR)
