= Dragiša Cvetković =

Yugoslav politician

- Драгиша Цветковић
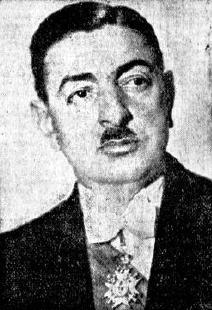

13th Prime Minister of Yugoslavia
- In office 5 February 1939 – 27 March 1941
- Monarch: Peter II
- Preceded by: Milan Stojadinović
- Succeeded by: Dušan Simović

Personal details
- Born: 15 January 1893 Niš, Kingdom of Serbia
- Died: 18 February 1969 (aged 76) Paris, France
- Occupation: Politician

Dragiša Cvetković (Serbian Cyrillic: Драгиша Цветковић; 15 January 1893 – 18 February 1969) was a Yugoslav politician active in the Kingdom of Yugoslavia. He served as the Prime Minister of the Kingdom of Yugoslavia from 1939 to 1941. He developed the federalization of Yugoslavia through the creation of the Banovina of Croatia via the Cvetković–Maček Agreement with Croat leader Vladko Maček. He signed the Yugoslav accession to the Tripartite Pact on 25 March 1941. Two days later, on 27 March, a group of officers carried out a military coup, and arrested Dragiša Cvetković and other ministers. German authorities arrested him on two occasions and took him to Banjica concentration camp. He fled on 4 September 1944 for Bulgaria. He spent the rest of his life in Paris.

He previously served as mayor of Niš. On 25 September 2009, the regional court in Cvetković's hometown of Niš rehabilitated him from charges laid against him by the Yugoslav government in 1945. City of Niš also named a street after him.

Political offices
Preceded by Milan Stojadinović	Prime Minister of Yugoslavia; 1939–1941	Succeeded by Dušan Simović
