= 6 January Dictatorship =

Period of Yugoslav history (1929–31)

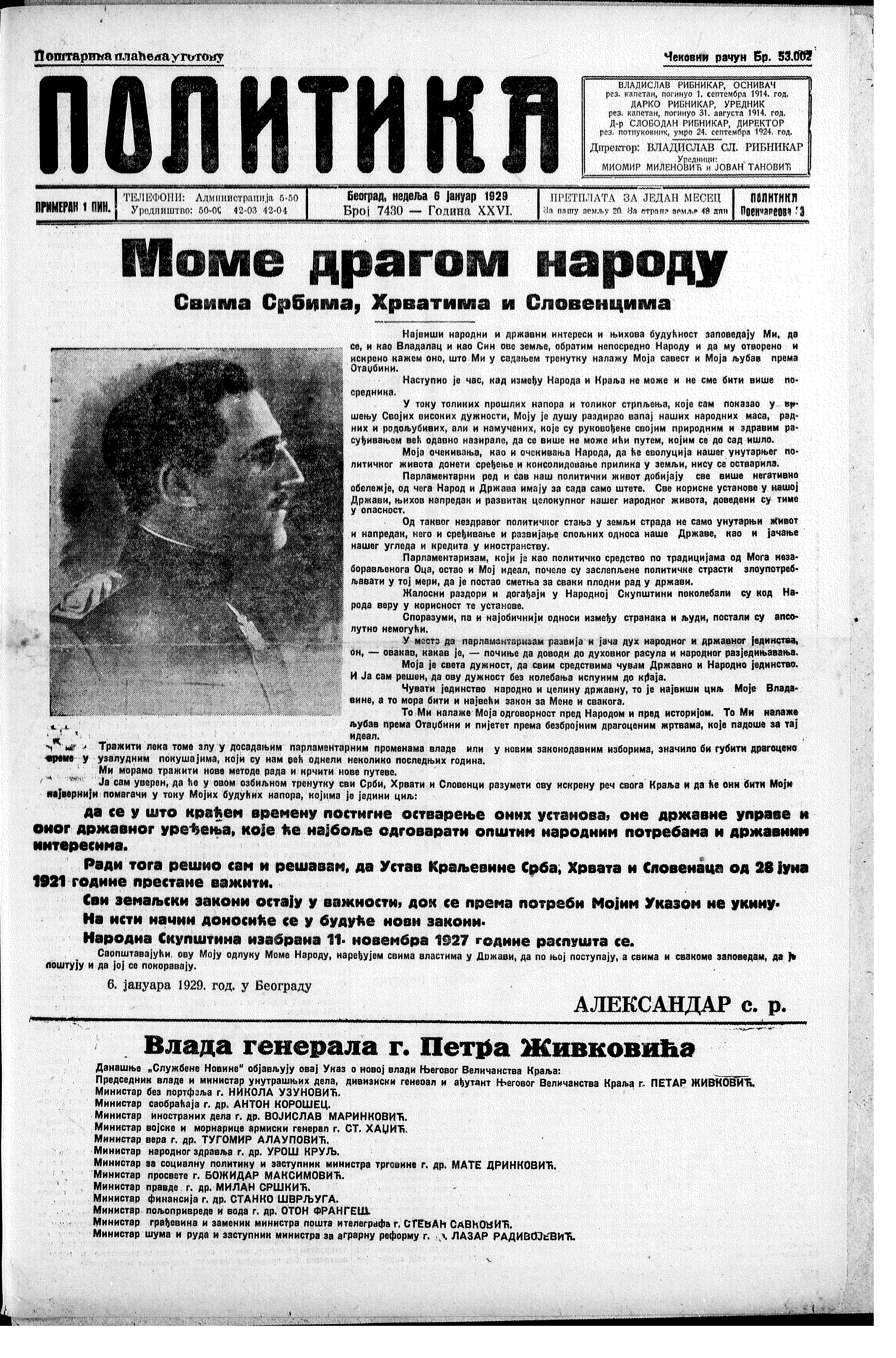
The front page of the 6 January 1929 edition of Politika featuring Alexander I of Yugoslavia and his proclamation

The 6 January Dictatorship (Serbian: Шестојануарска диктатура, Šestojanuarska diktatura; Croatian: Šestosiječanjska diktatura; Slovene: Šestojanuarska diktatura) was a royal dictatorship established in the Kingdom of Serbs, Croats and Slovenes (Kingdom of Yugoslavia after 1929) by King Alexander I (r. 1921–34) with the ultimate goal to create a Yugoslav ideology and a single Yugoslav nation. It began on 6 January 1929, when the king prorogued parliament and assumed control of the state, and ended with the 1931 Yugoslav Constitution.

== Prelude ==
In June 1928, Croatian Peasant Party leader Stjepan Radić was assassinated in the Parliament of Yugoslavia by a Montenegrin Serb leader and People's Radical Party politician Puniša Račić, during a tense argument.

== History ==
On 6 January 1929, using as a pretext the political crisis triggered by the shooting, King Alexander abolished the Vidovdan Constitution, prorogued the Parliament and assumed emergency powers. General Petar Živković, commander of the Royal Guard, became prime minister.

King Alexander appointed a cabinet solely responsible to him, and imposed tight censorship on the press. Initially, he claimed that this was only a temporary situation that would allow him to unify the country. Trying to reconcile ethnic tensions, especially between Serbian and Croatian politicians, Alexander aimed to establish a Yugoslav ideology and a single Yugoslav nation. He changed the name of the country to "Kingdom of Yugoslavia", and changed the internal divisions from the 33 oblasts to nine new banovinas on 3 October. This decision was made following a proposal by the British ambassador to better decentralize the country, modeled on Czechoslovakia.

Alexander outlawed all political parties based on ethnic, religious, or regional distinctions, reorganized the state administratively, and standardized legal systems, school curricula, and national holidays.

A Court for the Protection of the State (Državni sud za zaštitu države) was established shortly after the proclamation of the dictatorship and functioned as a key instrument of the regime for suppressing political opposition. Prominent opposition politicians Vladko Maček and Svetozar Pribićević were subjected to arrest and judicial repression under the court’s authority. Pribićević was placed under house arrest and later allowed to leave the country, going into exile in France, while Maček was imprisoned following proceedings before the State Protection Court. Over the course of the 1930s, Maček emerged as the leader of the United Opposition.

Immediately after the dictatorship was proclaimed, Croatian deputy Ante Pavelić left for exile from the country. The following years Pavelić worked to establish a revolutionary organization, the Ustaše, allied with the Internal Macedonian Revolutionary Organization (IMRO) against the state.

The Yugoslav regime continued its persecution of the Communist Party of Yugoslavia during this period. The so-called Seven Secretaries of the SKOJ was a series of young communist activists who were either killed by the royal police or died in prison during the dictatorship between June 1929 and October 1931.

In February 1931, Croatian historian and anti-Yugoslavist intellectual Milan Šufflay was assassinated in Zagreb. As a response, Albert Einstein and Heinrich Mann sent an appeal to the International League of Human Rights in Paris condemning the murder, accusing the Yugoslav government. The letter states of a "horrible brutality which is being practiced upon the Croatian People". In their letter, Einstein and Mann held the Yugoslav king Aleksandar explicitly responsible for these circumstances.

In September 1931, Alexander decreed a new Constitution which vested the King with executive power. It largely codified the emergency powers Alexander had exercised since 1929, effectively turning his government into a legal dictatorship. While elections were to be by universal male suffrage, the provision for a secret ballot was dropped. Pressure on public employees to vote for the governing party was to be a feature of all elections held under Alexander's constitution. Further, half the upper house was directly appointed by the King, and legislation could become law with the approval of one of the houses alone if also approved by the King.

== Aftermath ==
Opposition to the new regime among the Croats was strong and, in late 1932, the Croatian Peasant Party issued the Zagreb Points, which called for an end to the royal dictatorship and Serb hegemony in the Kingdom of Yugoslavia. The government responded by imprisoning a number of opposition figures, including Croatian Peasant Party leader Vladko Maček, who was sentenced to imprisonment in 1933. Despite these measures, opposition to the dictatorship continued, with Croatian political leaders pressing for a solution to the so-called “Croatian question.” In the mid-1930s, efforts toward compromise between the regime and Croatian political leaders intensified as part of broader attempts to address these tensions within the kingdom.

However, on 9 October 1934, the king was assassinated in Marseille, France, by the Bulgarian Veličko Kerin (also known by his revolutionary pseudonym Vlado Chernozemski), an activist of IMRO, in a conspiracy with Yugoslav exiles and radical members of banned political parties in cooperation with the Croatian extreme nationalist Ustaše organisation.

== Sources ==
- Banac, Ivo (1984). The National Question in Yugoslavia: Origins, History, Politics. Ithaca: Cornell University Press. ISBN 9780801494932.
- Newman, John Paul (2017). "War Veterans, Fascism, and Para-Fascist Departures in the Kingdom of Yugoslavia, 1918–1941". Fascism. 6: 63. doi:10.1163/22116257-00601003.
- Troch, Pieter (2017). "Yugoslavism between the world wars: indecisive nation building". Fascism. 38 (2): 227–244. doi:10.1080/00905990903517819. hdl:1854/LU-839236. S2CID 153840603.
- Grgić, Stipica (2018). "Pantheon on a tablecloth: Yugoslav dictatorship and the confrontation of national symbols in Croatia (1929–1935)". The Journal of Nationalism and Ethnicity. 46 (3): 458–470. doi:10.1080/00905992.2017.1357029. S2CID 158362422.
- Nielsen, Christian Axboe (2009). "Policing Yugoslavism: Surveillance, Denunciations, and Ideology during King Aleksandar's Dictatorship, 1929-1934". East European Politics and Societies. 23 (1): 34–62. doi:10.1177/0888325408326789. S2CID 145765948.
- Pavlović, Marko (2012). Časlav Ocić (ed.). "Jugoslovenska kraljevina prva evropska regionalna država" (PDF). Zbornik Matice srpske za društvene nauke. 141. Novi Sad: Matica srpska: 503–521. ISSN 0352-5732.
- Radelić, Zdenko (2023). Sud za zaštitu države (1929–1941) (in Croatian). Zagreb: Institut društvenih znanosti Ivo Pilar.
