= Nikola Pašić =

Serbian politician (1845–1926)

His Excellency Nikola Pašić
- Никола Пашић
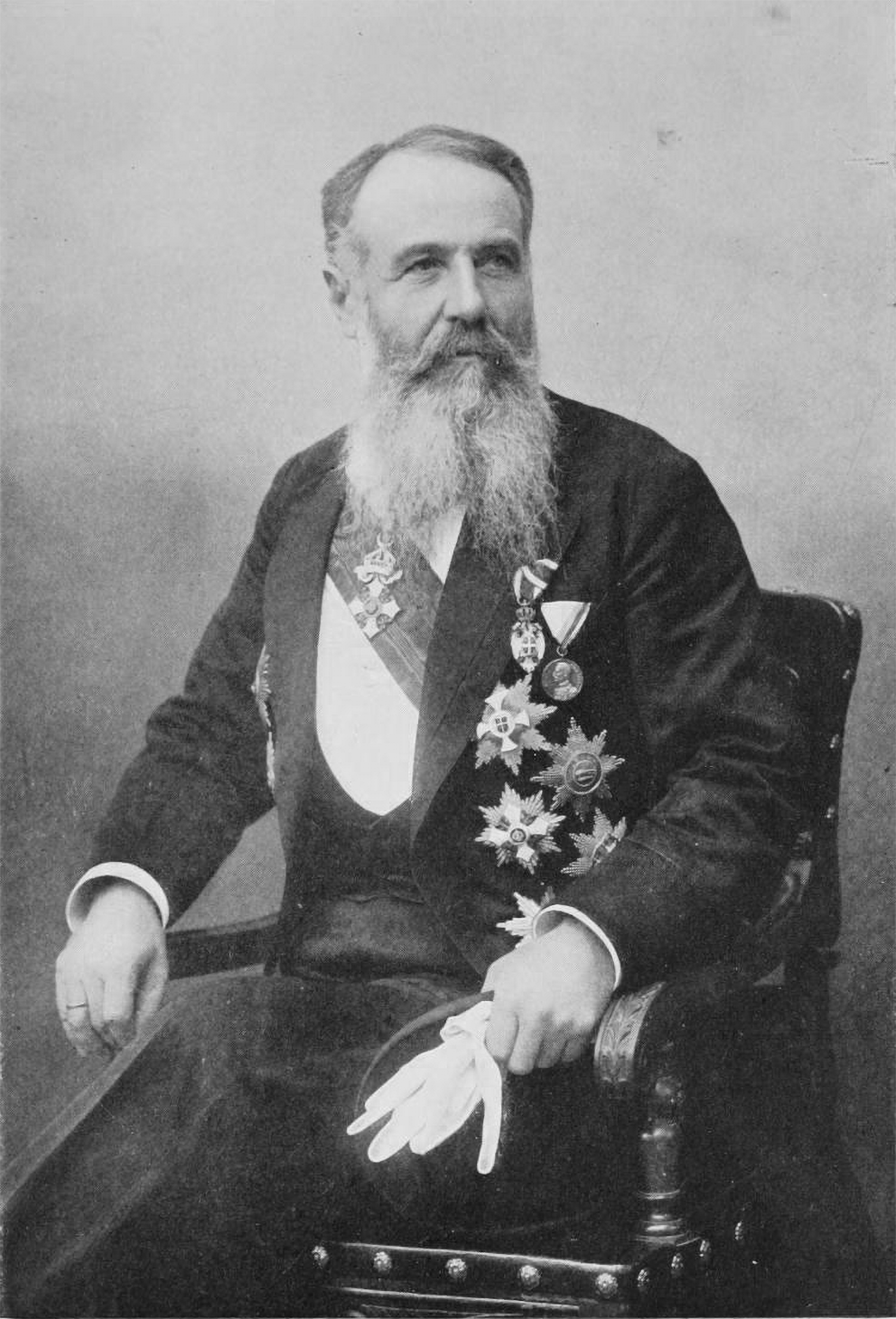
- Pašić in c. 1914

Prime Minister of the Kingdom of Serbs, Croats and Slovenes
- In office 6 November 1924 – 8 April 1926
- Monarch: Alexander I
- Preceded by: Ljubomir Davidović
- Succeeded by: Nikola Uzunović
- In office 1 January 1921 – 28 July 1924
- Monarchs: Peter I; Alexander I
- Preceded by: Milenko Vesnić
- Succeeded by: Ljubomir Davidović
- Acting; 1 December 1918 – 22 December 1918
- Monarch: Peter I
- Preceded by: Position established
- Succeeded by: Stojan Protić

Prime Minister of Serbia
- In office 12 September 1912 – 1 December 1918
- Monarch: Peter I
- Preceded by: Marko Trifković
- Succeeded by: Position abolished
- In office 24 October 1909 – 4 July 1911
- Monarch: Peter I
- Preceded by: Stojan Novaković
- Succeeded by: Milovan Milovanović
- In office 29 April 1906 – 20 July 1908
- Monarch: Peter I
- Preceded by: Sava Grujić
- Succeeded by: Petar Velimirović
- In office 10 December 1904 – 28 May 1905
- Monarch: Peter I
- Preceded by: Sava Grujić
- Succeeded by: Ljubomir Stojanović
- In office 23 February 1891 – 22 August 1892
- Monarch: Alexander I
- Preceded by: Sava Grujić
- Succeeded by: Jovan Avakumović

Mayor of Belgrade
- In office 29 December 1889 – 14 January 1891
- Preceded by: Živko Karabiberović
- Succeeded by: Milovan Malinković
- In office 10 January – 13 November 1897
- Preceded by: Nikola Stevanović
- Succeeded by: Nikola Stevanović

Minister of Foreign Affairs of Kingdom of Serbia
- In office 21 March 1892 – 22 August 1892
- Monarch: Alexander I
- Prime Minister: Himself
- Preceded by: Mihailo Kr. Đorđević
- Succeeded by: Jovan Avakumović
- In office 8 February 1904 – 28 May 1905
- Monarch: Peter I
- Prime Minister: Sava Grujić; Himself
- Preceded by: Andra Nikolić
- Succeeded by: Jovan Žujović
- In office 29 April 1906 – 20 July 1908
- Monarch: Peter I
- Prime Minister: Himself
- Preceded by: Vasilije Antonić
- Succeeded by: Milovan Milovanović
- In office 12 September 1912 – 23 March 1918
- Monarch: Peter I
- Prime Minister: Himself
- Preceded by: Jovan Jovanović Pižon
- Succeeded by: Mihailo Gavrilović

Minister of Finance of Kingdom of Serbia
- In office 23 November 1891 – 22 August 1892
- Monarch: Peter I
- Prime Minister: Himself
- Preceded by: Mihailo V. Vujić
- Succeeded by: Dmitrije Stojanović

Minister of the Army of Kingdom of Serbia
- Acting
- In office 22 November – 14 December 1914
- Monarch: Peter I
- Prime Minister: Himself
- Preceded by: Dušan Stefanović
- Succeeded by: Radovije Bojović

Personal details
- Born: 18 December 1845 Zaječar, Serbia
- Died: 10 December 1926 (aged 80) Belgrade, Kingdom of Serbs, Croats and Slovenes
- Resting place: New Cemetery
- Party: People's Radical Party
- Spouse: Đurđina Duković
- Children: 3
- Education: Belgrade Higher School; Federal Polytechnic School

Nikola Pašić (Serbian Cyrillic: Никола Пашић, pronounced [nǐkola pǎʃitɕ]; 18 December 1845 – 10 December 1926) was a Serbian and Yugoslav politician and diplomat. During his political career, which spanned almost five decades, he served five times as prime minister of Serbia and three times as prime minister of Yugoslavia, leading 22 governments in total. He played an instrumental role in the founding of Yugoslavia and is considered one of the most influential figures in Serbian twentieth-century history. With 12 years in office, Pašić was the longest-serving prime minister of Serbia.

Born in Zaječar, in eastern Serbia, Pašić studied engineering in Switzerland and embraced radical politics as a student at the Polytechnical School in Zürich. On his return to Serbia, he was elected to the National Assembly in 1878 as a member of the People's Radical Party, which was formally organised three years later. After the failed Timok Rebellion against the government of King Milan I, he was sentenced to death but narrowly avoided capture and execution. He spent the next six years exiled in Bulgaria. Following Milan's abdication in 1889, Pašić returned to Serbia and was elected president of the National Assembly. A year later he also became mayor of Belgrade. In 1891, Pašić became prime minister for the first time, but was forced to resign the following year.

Following the May Coup and the murder of King Alexander I, Pašić emerged as a leading figure in Serbian politics while the Radical Party established its dominance. He served as prime minister from 1904 to 1905, 1906 to 1908, 1909 to 1911 and finally from 1912 to 1918, as Serbia entered a golden age of economic growth and growing influence on the continental stage. He led Serbia to victory in the Balkan Wars against the Ottomans and Bulgaria, almost doubling the size of Serbian territories. The assassination of Archduke Franz Ferdinand brought Serbia to war with Austria-Hungary, sparking the First World War in which the country was overrun by the Central Powers. Pašić led the government in exile in the Greek island of Corfu, where the Corfu Declaration was signed and paved the way for a future state of South Slavs.

In 1918, the Kingdom of Serbs, Croats, and Slovenes was officially proclaimed, and Pašić was recognised as the de facto prime minister of the new state. Despite his resignation just a month later, he took part in the Paris Peace Conference as the Serbian representative. He served as prime minister on two more occasions, from 1921 to July 1924 and from November 1924 to 1926. During his final tenure, he oversaw the creation of the kingdom's first constitution. He died of a heart attack in late 1926, at age 80. A proponent of populism, nationalism, and political pragmatism, Pašić began his career as a socialist but became a conservative in the 1910s.

== Early life ==
Pašić was born in Zaječar, Principality of Serbia. According to Slovenian ethnologist Niko Županič, Pašić's ancestors migrated from the Tetovo region in the 16th century and founded the village of Zvezdan near Zaječar. Pašić himself said that his ancestors settled from the area of the Lešok Monastery in Tetovo. Jovan Dučić concluded that Pašić hailed from Veliki Izvor near Zaječar, and that Pašić's ancestry in Tetovo had been long lost. Bulgarian ethnologist Stilian Chilingirov stated that Pašić's roots were from the village of Veliki Izvor, founded during the 18th century by refugees from the Ottoman Bulgarian village of Golyam Izvor in Teteven area in today's Bulgaria. Ljubomir Miletić also claimed that Pašić's grandfather settled in Veliki Izvor from Teteven area, which was refuted by Serbian authors, claiming his parents were both born in Zaječar. Carlo Sforza mentioned that Pašić "was lucky in another respect, he belonged to the Shopi community". There also are claims attributing Aromanian descent to Pašić.

Pašić completed elementary school in Zaječar, and finished his gymnasium work in Negotin and Kragujevac. In the fall of 1865, he enrolled in the Belgrade Higher School and in 1867 received a state scholarship to study railroad engineering at the Polytechnical School in Zürich. Historian Gale Stokes wrote that Pašić was a "serious student" who "went beyond the required subjects of his specialization". According to Stokes, Pašić's early socialist ideals were shaped by German experiences rather than Marxist or Russian populism, as his studies were focused on German history and contemporary events which were taught by Germanophile professors. He graduated as an engineer but, apart from his brief participation in the construction of the Vienna–Budapest railroad, he never worked in this field.

== Radical Party ==
=== Origins ===
While a student in Zürich, Pašić lived near other Serbian students and became politically involved, initially as an organizer. Some of these students would later become the core of the Socialist and Radical movement in Serbia. One of them was Svetozar Marković, who would become a major socialist ideologue in Serbia. Along with Marković, Pera Velimirović, Jovan Žujović, and others, Pašić became an early member of the "Radical Party".

After returning to Serbia, Pašić went to Bosnia to support the anti-Ottoman uprising of Nevesinjska puška. The Socialists started publishing Samouprava which later became the official bulletin of the Radical Party. After Marković's death in 1875, Pašić became the leader of the movement and in 1878 was elected to the National Assembly of Serbia, even before the party was formed. In 1880, he made an unprecedented move in the Serbian political scene by forming an opposition deputies' club in the assembly. Finally, a party program was completed in January 1881 and the Radical Party, the first systematically organized Serbian party, was officially established, with Pašić elected its first president.

=== Timok Rebellion ===
The party and Pašić quickly gained popularity; the Radicals received 54 percent of the vote in the September 1883 elections, while the Progressive Party, favored by King Milan Obrenović IV only got 30 percent. Despite the Radicals' clear victory, the pro-Austrian king, who disliked the pro-Russian Pašić and the Radical party, nominated old non-partisan hardliner Nikola Hristić to form a government. The assembly refused to cooperate and the session was suspended.

The atmosphere was made worse when Hristić attempted to take away peasants' guns, in order to establish a regular army. As a result, clashes began in eastern Serbia, in the Timok valley. King Milan blamed the unrest on the Radicals and sent troops to crush the rebellion. Pašić was sentenced to death in absentia and he narrowly avoided arrest by fleeing to Hungary. Twenty-one others were sentenced to death and executed, and 734 more were imprisoned.

=== Exile in Bulgaria ===
For the next six years, Pašić lived with relatives in Bulgaria, supported by the Bulgarian government. He lived in Sofia, where he worked as a building contractor, and also worked for a short time in the Ministry of Interior. According to Bulgarian sources, he spoke quite fluent Bulgarian, but mixed it with a large number of Serbian words and phrases, and it is claimed that he asked Petko Karavelov's friends who hailed from Stara Planina about the characteristics of that region in Bulgaria, explaining that his ancestors had migrated from there to Serbia some generations before.

Bulgarian testimonies completely differ in one important respect, whether Pašić worked actively in politics during his exile in Sofia. The official Bulgarian support became one of several reasons for Milan's decision to start the Serbo-Bulgarian War in 1885. After suffering a decisive defeat, Milan granted an amnesty for those sentenced for the Timok rebellion, but not for Pašić, who remained in Bulgarian exile. In 1889, Milan abdicated in favor of his 12-year-old son Alexander. A few days later the newly formed Radical cabinet of Sava Grujić pardoned Pašić.

== High politics (1890–1903) ==
=== President of assembly and mayor ===
On 13 October 1889, Pašić was elected president of the National Assembly, a duty he would perform (de jure though, not de facto) until 9 January 1892. He was also elected mayor of Belgrade from 11 January 1890 to 26 January 1891. His presiding over the assembly saw the largest number of laws being voted in the history of Serbian parliamentarism, while as the mayor of Belgrade he was responsible for cobbling the muddy city streets. He was reelected twice as president of the National Assembly from 13 June 1893 to April 1895 (though from September 1893 only in name; his deputy Dimitrije Katić acted for him) and 12 July 1897 to 29 June 1898 and once more mayor of Belgrade 22 January 1897 to 25 November 1897.

After wisely not accepting to head the government immediately after his return from exile, Nikola Pašić became prime minister for the first time on 23 February 1891. However, ex-king Milan returned to Serbia in May 1890 and again began campaigning against Pašić and the Radicals. On 16 June 1892, Kosta Protić, one of three regents during the minority of Alexander I, died. Under the constitution, the National Assembly was to elect a new regent, but as the assembly was on several months' vacation, Pašić had to call for an emergency session. Jovan Ristić, the most powerful regent, fearing Pašić might be elected co-regent and thus undermine his position, refused to allow the extra session, and Pašić resigned as prime minister on 22 August 1892. During his tenure, he was also foreign minister from 2 April 1892 and acting finance minister from 3 November 1891.

=== Alexander's coup d'état ===
In 1893, though still only 16 years old, King Alexander declared himself of age and dismissed the regents who had governed since 1889. He named moderate Radical Lazar Dokić to form a government. Though he received approval from some members of the Radical party to participate in the government, Pašić refused. To exclude him from the political scene in Serbia, Alexander sent Pašić as his extraordinary envoy to Russia in 1893–1894. In 1894, Alexander brought his father back to Serbia. In 1896, the king managed to force Pašić to back off from pushing for constitutional reforms. However, since 1897 both kings, Milan and Alexander, had ruled almost jointly. As both disliked Pašić, in 1898 they had him imprisoned for nine months because Samouprava published a statement about his previous opposition to King Milan. Pašić claimed he was misquoted, with no effect.

=== Ivandan's assassination attempt ===
Former fireman, Đura Knežević, who was sentenced to death, tried to assassinate ex-king Milan in June 1899 (Serbian: Ивандањски атентат). The same evening, Milan declared that the Radical Party tried to kill him and all heads of the Radical Party were arrested, including Pašić who had just been released from prison from his previous sentence. The accusations that the Radicals or Pašić were linked to the assassination attempt were unfounded. Still, Milan insisted that Nikola Pašić and Kosta Taušanović be sentenced to death. Austria-Hungary feared that the execution of the pro-Russian Pašić would force Russia to intervene, abandoning an 1897 agreement to leave Serbia in status quo. A special envoy was sent from Vienna to Milan to warn him that Austria-Hungary would boycott the Obrenović dynasty if Pašić was executed. Noted Serbian historian Slobodan Jovanović later claimed that the entire assassination was staged so that Milan could get rid of the Radical Party.

Imprisoned and unaware of Austria-Hungary's interference, Pašić confessed that the Radical Party had been disloyal to the dynasty, which probably saved many people from prison. As part of the deal reached with the interior minister Đorđe Genčić, the government officially left its own role out of the statement, so that it appeared that Pašić behaved cowardly and succumbed to the pressure. Pašić was sentenced to five years but released immediately. This caused future conflict within the Radical Party as younger members considered Pašić a coward and traitor, and split from the party. For the remainder of Alexander's rule, Pašić retired from politics. Although the young monarch disliked Pašić, he was often summoned for consultations but would refrain from giving advice and insist that he was no longer involved with politics.

== Golden age of democracy (1903–1914) ==
=== Royal assassination ===
Nikola Pašić was not among the conspirators who plotted to assassinate King Alexander. The assassination occurred on the night of 10–11 June [O.S. 28–29 May] 1903, and both the King and Queen Draga Mašin were killed, as well as Prime Minister Dimitrije Cincar-Marković and Defence Minister Milovan S. Pavlović. The Radical Party did not form the first cabinet after the coup d'état, but after winning the elections on 4 October 1903, they remained in almost uninterrupted power for the next 15 years.

In the beginning, the Radicals opposed the appointment of a new king, Peter I Karađorđević, calling his appointment illegal. But Pašić later changed his mind after seeing how people willingly accepted the new monarch as well as King Peter I, educated in Western Europe, was a democratic, mild ruler, unlike the last two despotic and erratic Obrenović sovereigns. In the next two decades, the major clash between the king and the prime minister would be Pašić's refusal to raise to royal appanage.

Nikola Pašić became foreign minister on 8 February 1904 in Sava Grujić's cabinet and headed a government under his own presidency 10 December 1904 to 28 May 1905, continuing as foreign minister as well. During the following decade, under the leadership of Pašić and the Radical Party, Serbia grew so prosperous that many historians call this period the modern golden age of Serbia. The country evolved into a European democracy and with financial and economic growth, political influence also grew which caused constant problems with Serbia's largest neighbour, Austria-Hungary, which even developed plans to turn Serbia into one of its provinces (already in 1879 German chancellor Otto von Bismarck said that Serbia was the stumbling-block in Austria's development).

=== Austro-Hungarian customs war ===
As Austro-Hungarian latent provocations of Serbia concerning Serbs living in Bosnia and Herzegovina, officially still part of the Ottoman Empire but occupied by Austria-Hungary since 1878 and causing problems to Serbian exports which mainly went through Austria-Hungary (as Serbia was landlocked) didn't bring results, Austria-Hungary began a customs war in 1906. Pašić formed another cabinet from 30 April 1906 to 20 July 1908. Pressured by the Austro-Hungarian government which asked from Serbia to buy everything from Austrian companies, from salt to cannons, he replied to Austrian government that he personally would do that, but that the National Assembly was against this.

Austria-Hungary closed the borders which did cause a severe blow to the Serbian economy initially, but later it will bounce back even more developed than it was, thanks to the Pašić swift change towards the Western European countries. He forced conspirators of the 1903 coup into retirement which was a condition for reestablishing diplomatic connections with the United Kingdom, he bought cannons from France, etc. In the midst of the customs war, Austria-Hungary officially annexed Bosnia and Herzegovina in 1908 which caused mass protests in Serbia and political instability, but Pašić managed to calm the situation down. In this period, Pašić's major ally, Imperial Russia, was not much of a help, being defeated by Japan in the Russo-Japanese War and facing domestic political instability.

=== Balkan Wars ===
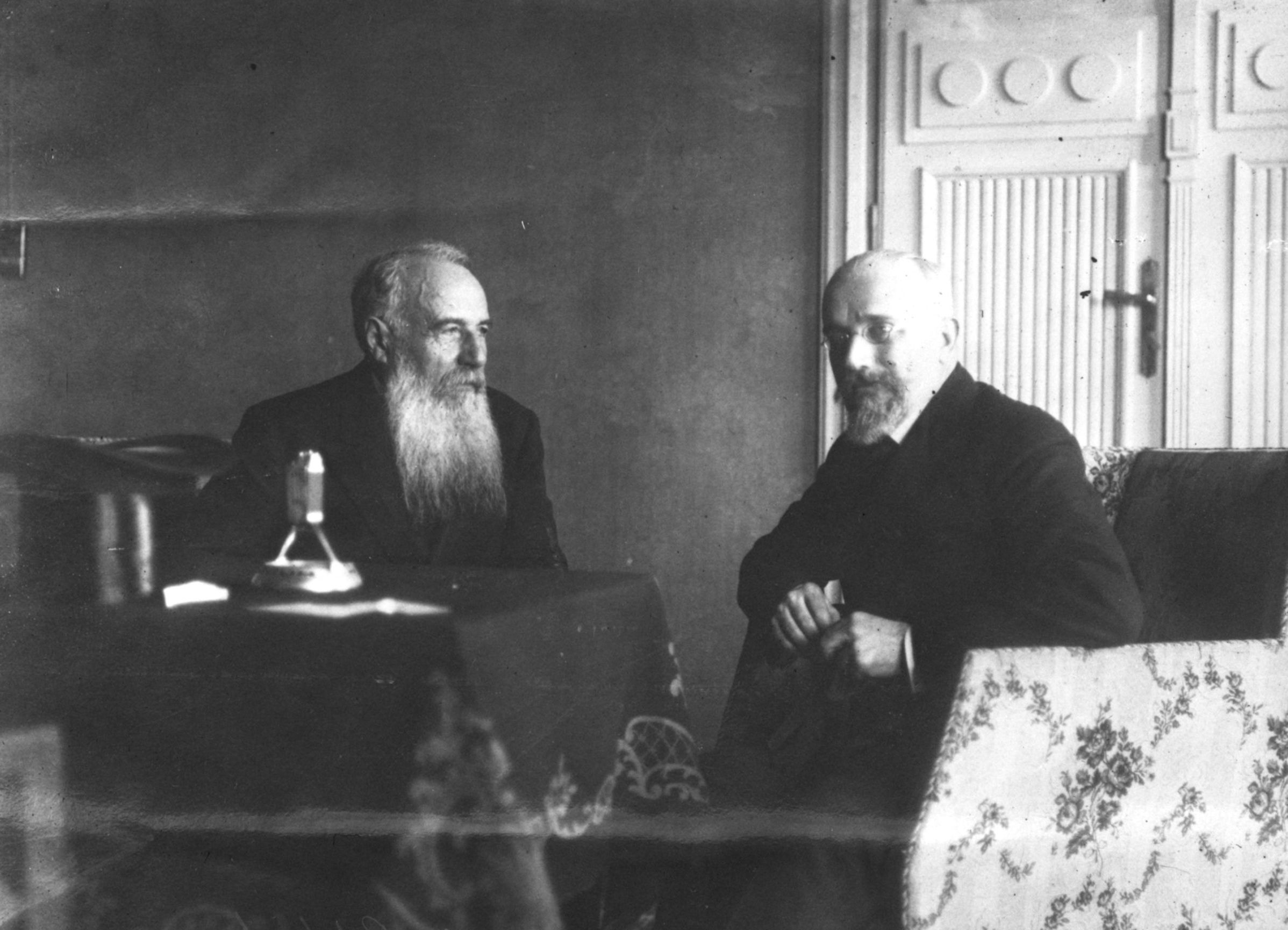
Pašić with the Greek Prime Minister, Eleftherios Venizelos, in 1913

Pašić formed two more cabinets (24 October 1909 to 4 July 1911 and from 12 September 1912). He was one of the major players in the formation of the Balkan League which later resulted in the First Balkan War (1912–13) and the Second Balkan War (1913) which almost doubled the size of Serbia with the territories of what was at the time considered Old Serbia (Kosovo, Metohija and Vardar Macedonia), retaken from the Ottomans after five centuries. He clashed with some military structures about the handling of the newly acquired territories. Pašić believed the area should be included into the Serbian political and administrative system through the democratic elections, while the Royal Serbian Army sought to keep the areas under the military control. After one year of tensions Pašić dismissed the military administrator of Old Serbia and scheduled new elections for 1914 but the outbreak of World War I prevented it.

=== Outbreak of the Great War ===
After the Assassination in Sarajevo on 28 June 1914 when members of the Serbian revolutionary organization Young Bosnia assassinated the Austro-Hungarian heir-apparent Archduke Franz Ferdinand, the Austro-Hungarian government immediately accused the Serbian government of being behind the assassination. The general consensus today is that government did not organize it, but how much Pašić knew about it is still a controversial issue and it appears that every historian has his or her own opinion on the subject: Pašić knew nothing (Ćorović); Pašić knew something is about to happen and told Russia that Austria would attack Serbia before the assassination (Dragnić); Pašić knew but as the assassins were connected to the powerful members of the Serbian intelligence, was afraid to do anything about it personally so he warned Vienna (Balfour).

According to Ljubomir Jovanović, who was the minister of education at the time, Nikola Pašić was at least partially aware of the preparations for the assassination of Austro-Hungarian heir Francis Ferdinand, which were carried out by members of the Young Bosnia. In his essay, a contribution to the memorial book "The Blood of Slavdom" (Serbo-Croatian Latin: Krv Slovenstva) published on the occasion of the tenth anniversary of the outbreak of the First World War in 1924, Jovanović states that "at the end of May or the beginning of June" in 1914 Pašić told some members of his government that some people "were preparing to go to Sarajevo and murder Francis Ferdinand, who was to be solemnly received there on St. Vitus's Day."

Austria-Hungary presented him the July Ultimatum, written together with the envoys of the German ambassadors in such a vein that it would be unlikely for the Serbian government to accept. After extensive consultations in the country itself and formidable pressure from outside to accept it, Pašić told the Austrian ambassador Wladimir Giesl von Gieslingen (who had already packed his bags) that Serbia accepted all the ultimatum demands except that Austrian police could independently travel throughout Serbia and conduct their own investigation. Austria-Hungary answered by formally declaring war on Serbia on 28 July 1914.

== World War I and Yugoslavia ==
=== Glory, defeat and the South Slav state ===
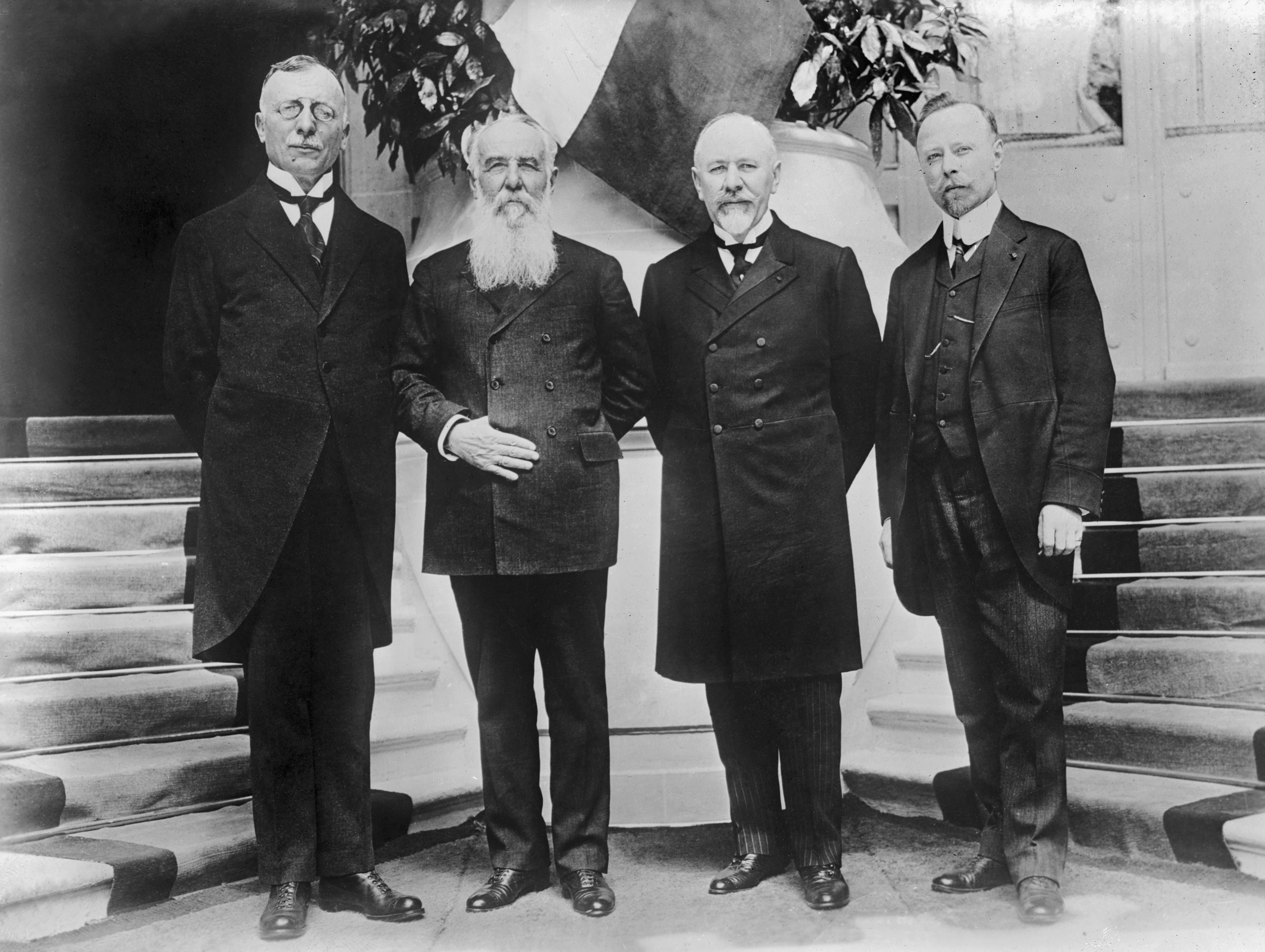
From the left: A. Trumbić, Nikola Pašić, Milenko Vesnić and Ivan Žolger

Serbian defeat was considered to be imminent, at least by external onlookers, compared to the strength of Austria-Hungary. Serbia had obviously prepared well, however, and after a series of battles in 1914–1915 (Battle of Cer, Battle of Kolubara), the loss and recapture of Belgrade, and a Serbian counter-offensive with occupation of some Austrian territories (in Syrmia and eastern Bosnia), the Austro-Hungarian Army backed off. On 5 July 1914, things changed as old King Peter I relinquished his duties to the heir apparent Alexander, making him his regent.

On 17 September 1914, Pašić and Albanian leader Essad Pasha Toptani signed in Niš the secret Treaty of Serbian-Albanian Alliance. The treaty had 15 points which focused on setting up joint Serbian-Albanian political and military institutions, as well as a military alliance between Albania and Serbia. The treaty also envisaged building of the rail-road to Durrës, financial and military support of the Kingdom of Serbia to Essad Pasha's position as Albanian ruler and drawing of the demarcation line by a special Serbo-Albanian commission. In October 1914, Essad Pasha returned to Albania. With Italian and Serbian financial backing, he established armed forces in Dibër and captured the interior of Albania and Durrës. Pašić ordered that his followers be aided with money and arms.

Unlike Peter, Alexander was not a democratic spirit, rather a dictatorial one and personally disliked Pašić and talk of democracy. Open strife began very soon, when Serbia was proposed the London Pact by which it was supposed to expand into most of the ethnic Serbian territories to the west, including a section of the Adriatic coast and some ethnic Albanian territories in northern Albania. In return, Serbia was supposed to relinquish part of Vardar Macedonia to Bulgaria so that the latter would enter the war on the Entente side. Both Pašić and Prince-regent Alexander were against this as they considered it to be a betrayal of the Croatian, Slovenian and Serbian sacrifices in the Balkan Wars, as negotiations for the future South Slav state had already began. However, Pašić and King Peter were not personally much for the Yugoslav idea, unlike the regent who pushed the issue of creating as large a state as possible. Serbia refused the pact and was attacked by Austria-Hungary, Germany and Bulgaria. The Government and the army retreated to the south in the direction of Greece, but were cut off by Bulgarian forces and had to go through Albania and to the Greek island of Corfu where the Corfu Declaration was signed in 1917 preparing the ground for the future South Slav state of Yugoslavia.

=== Creation of the Kingdom of Serbs, Croats and Slovenes ===
The Kingdom of Serbs, Croats and Slovenes (SHS) was officially proclaimed on 1 December 1918, and, being the Prime Minister of Serbia at that time, Pašić was generally considered the de facto Prime Minister of the new South Slav state, as well. The political agreement was reached that Pašić would continue on as Prime Minister when the first government of the new state was to be formed, but as a result of his longtime dislike of Pašić, Prince-regent Alexander nominated Stojan Protić to form the government. Consequently, Pašić stepped down on 20 December 1918.

Despite being removed from the government, as the most experienced of politicians, Nikola Pašić was the main negotiator for the new state at the Paris Peace Conference of 1919. In an effort to secure the maximalist agenda of the regent, he did not push on the question of the Czech Corridor, Timișoara, and Szeged, managed to secure borders with Albania and Bulgaria, but failed to annex Fiume (which became an independent state) and most of Carinthia (which remained part of Austria). At the time when Benito Mussolini was willing to modify the Treaty of Rapallo, which cut off a quarter of Slovene ethnic territory from the remaining three-quarters of Slovenes living in the Kingdom of the Serbs, Croats and Slovenes, in order to annex the Free State of Fiume to Italy, Pašić's attempts to correct the borders at Postojna and Idrija were undermined by Prince-regent Alexander preferring "good relations" with Italy.

Elections held on 28 November 1920 showed that the Radical Party was the second strongest in the country, having just one seat less than the Democratic Party (91 to 92, respectively, out of 419 seats). However, Pašić managed to form a coalition and became Prime Minister again on 1 January 1921.

Pašić became a very large landowner in the country due to expropriation of Albanian land in Kosovo and other areas.

=== Vidovdan Constitution ===
As soon as talks about the constitution of the new state began, two diametrically opposite sides, Serbian and Croatian, were established. Both Pašić and Prince-regent Alexander wanted a unitary state but for different reasons. Pašić considered that the Serbs could be outvoted in such a state and that an unconsolidated and heterogeneous entity would fall apart if it was a federal one, while the prince-regent simply didn't like to share power with others, which was shown 8 years later when he conducted a coup d'état.

Stjepan Radić, a leading Croatian politician for a joint Serbian-Croatian state would be a temporary solution on the way to Croatian independence, asked for a federal republic. As Pašić had majority in the assembly, a new constitution was proclaimed on Vidovdan (St. Vitus day), 28 June 1921, organizing the Kingdom of the Serbs, Croats and Slovenes as a parliamentary (albeit highly unitary) monarchy, abolishing even the remaining shreds of autonomy which had Slovenia, Croatia, Dalmatia, Montenegro, Bosnia and Herzegovina and Vojvodina (provincial governments). In the early 1920s, the Yugoslav government of Prime Minister Pašić used police pressure over voters and ethnic minorities, confiscation of opposition pamphlets and other measures of election rigging to keep the opposition, mainly the autonomy-minded Croats, in minority in the Yugoslav parliament.

During his career as prime minister in the interwar period, Pašić continued to play the role of an important diplomatic negotiator in bilateral talks with neighboring countries. Among his most important foreign policy successes in this period was the settlement of disputes with Bulgaria. A Balkan correspondent of The Times wrote in 1925 that the crown of Pašić's long political career was "the successful promotion of a Serbo-Bulgar understanding". He also stated that Pašić' personal characteristics and experience in Bulgaria, where he spent his exile, contributed to that success: "No South Slav is more fitted to accomplish this arduous feat than the old statesman from the Serb marches, who speaks Serb with a Bulgar accent and in his middle age was a political exile in Bulgaria".

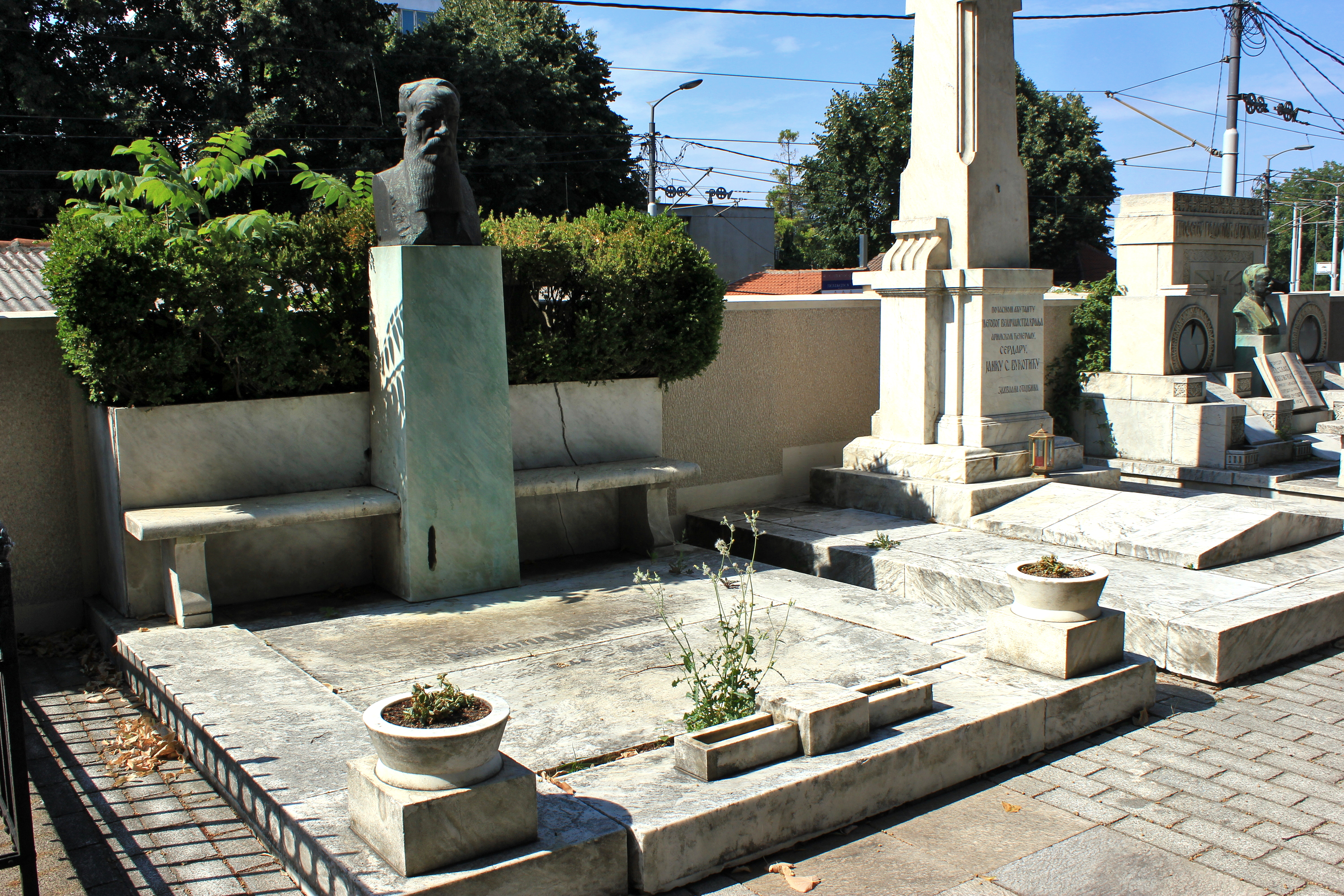
Pašić's grave at the Belgrade New Cemetery. The grave of Janko Vukotić can be seen to the right.

Pašić remained prime minister until 8 April 1926, with a short break 27 July 1924 to 6 November 1924, when the government was headed by Ljuba Davidović. After relinquishing temporarily the post to his party colleague Nikola Uzunović, Pasic attempted in 1926 to regain his job. Now a king, Alexander refused to reappoint Pašić using as a pretext the scandals of Pašić's son Rade. The following day, on 10 December 1926, Nikola Pašić suffered a heart attack and died in Belgrade, at age 80. He was interred in Belgrade's New Cemetery. Milenko Vesnić is interred to the right of Pašić's grave and Janko Vukotić is interred to the left of the grave.

== Private life ==
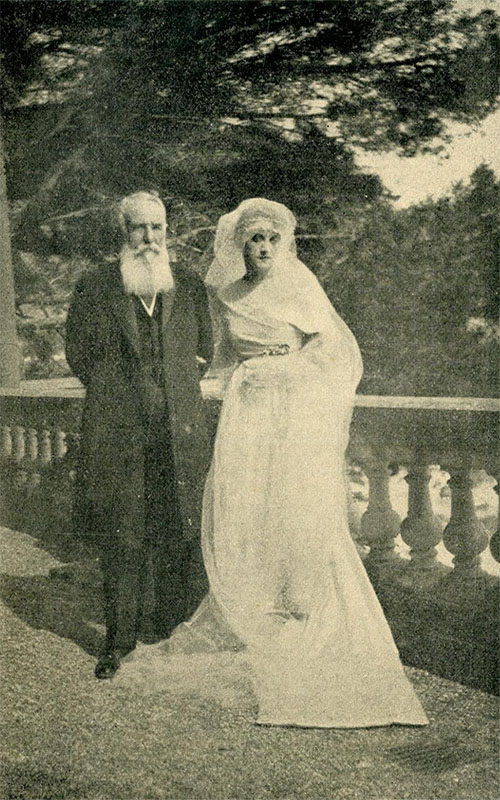
Nikola Pašić and his daughter Pava

Nikola Pašić married Đurđina Duković, daughter of a wealthy Serbian grains trader from Trieste. They were married in the Russian church in Florence to avoid the gathering of the numerous Serbian colony in Trieste and had three children: son Radomir-Rade and daughters Dara and Pava. Radomir-Rade had two sons: Vladislav, an architect (died 1978) and Nicholas "Nikola" (1918–2015), an Oxford University law graduate who resided in Toronto, Canada, where he founded a Serbian National Academy.

His granddaughter Katarina Račić (4 Jul 1919, London - 20 December 1946) married Prince Teymuraz Bagration-Mukhrani, son of Princess Tatiana of Russia, on 27 October 1940. At the time of the wedding, he was 28 and she was 21, but the marriage ended with Katarina's death at the age of 27. He later remarried and became brother-in-law of Archduke Rudolf of Austria, son of Emperor Charles I of Austria.

== Legacy ==
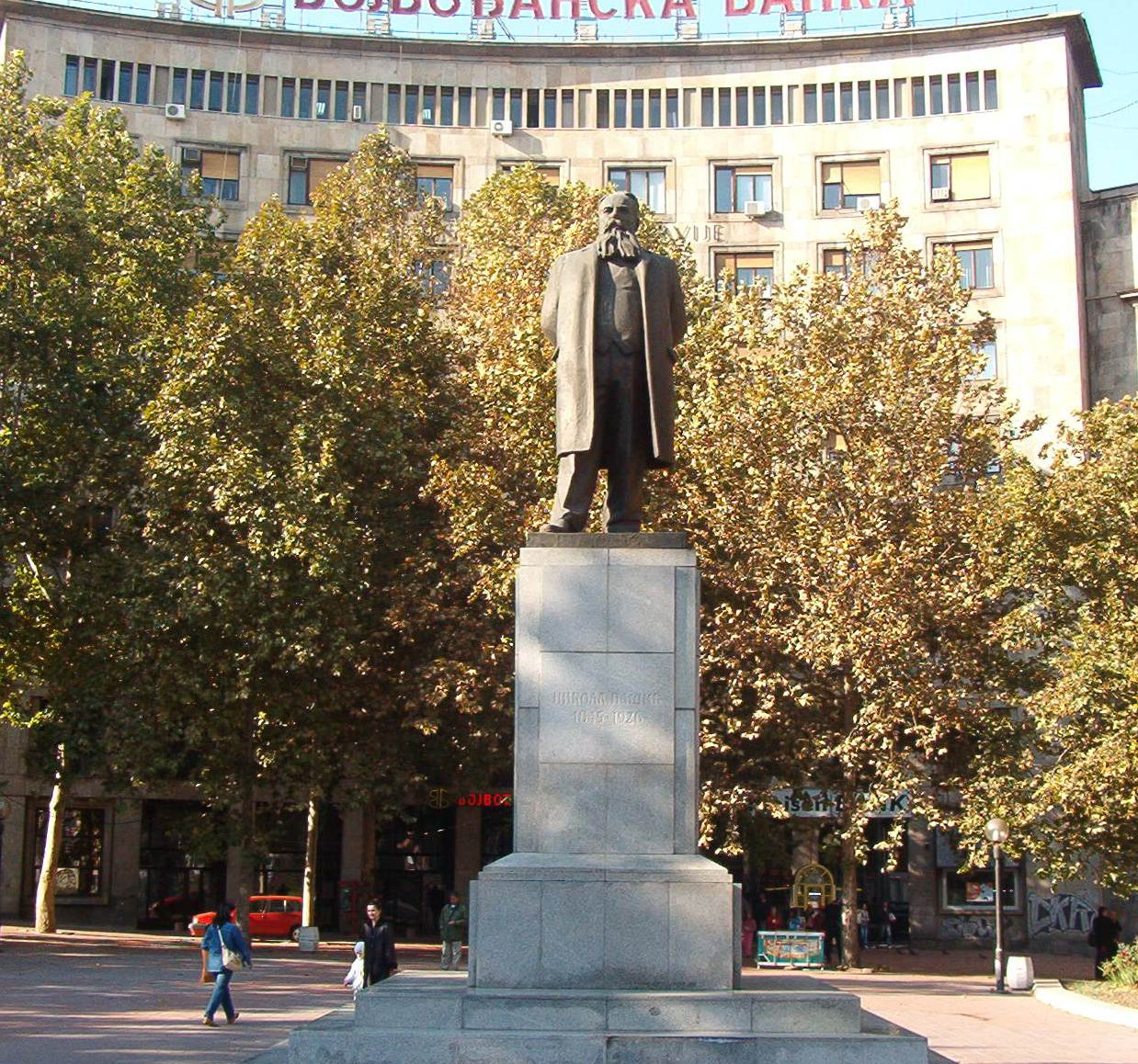
Monument to Nikola Pašić, Nikola Pašić Square, Belgrade

A central square in Belgrade is named after him, Square of Nikola Pašić (Serbian: Трг Николе Пашића/Trg Nikole Pašića). During the Communist regime, the square was named after Karl Marx and Friedrich Engels. The 4.2-meter-tall (14 ft) bronze statue of Pašić stands in the square, overlooking the building of the assembly. He is included in The 100 most prominent Serbs. Pašić was awarded the Russian Order of the White Eagle with brilliants, the Order of Carol I of Romania and Order of Karađorđe's Star.

== Media portrayals ==
- In 1995 television miniseries The End of Obrenović Dynasty, Nikola Pašić was portrayed by actor Petar Kralj.
- The Last Audience, a television miniseries based on the biography of Nikola Pašić and directed by George Kadijevich, was produced in 2008 by the Serbian broadcasting service RTS.

== Works cited ==
- Anonymous (22 September 1925). "Towards Balkan Peace". The Times. p. 15.
- Seton-Watson, Robert (16 February 1925). "The Serajevo Murder". The Times. p. 8.

Government offices
Preceded by Sava Grujić	Prime Minister of Serbia; 1891–1892	Succeeded by Jovan Avakumović
Preceded by Mihailo V. Vujić	Minister of Finance of Serbia; 1891–1892	Succeeded by Dimitrije Stojanović
Preceded by Sava Grujić	Prime Minister of Serbia; 1904–1905	Succeeded by Ljubomir Stojanović
Preceded by Sava Grujić	Prime Minister of Serbia; 1906–1908	Succeeded by Petar Velimirović
Preceded by Stojan Novaković	Prime Minister of Serbia; 1909–1911	Succeeded by Milovan Milovanović
Preceded by Marko Trifković	Prime Minister of Serbia; 1912–1918	Succeeded by himself in Yugoslavia
Preceded by Himself in Serbia	Prime Minister of Yugoslavia; 1918	Succeeded by Stojan Protić
Preceded by Milenko Vesnić	Prime Minister of Yugoslavia; 1921–1924	Succeeded by Ljubomir Davidović
Preceded by Ljubomir Davidović	Prime Minister of Yugoslavia; 1924–1926	Succeeded by Nikola Uzunović
Preceded by Mihailo Kr. Đorđević	Minister of Foreign Affairs; 1892	Succeeded by Jovan Avakumović
Preceded by Andrs Nikolić	Minister of Foreign Affairs; 1904-1905	Succeeded by Jovan Žujović
Preceded by Vasilije Antonić	Minister of Foreign Affairs; 1906-1908	Succeeded by Milovan Milovanović
Preceded by Jovan Jovanović Pižon	Minister of Foreign Affairs; 1912-1918	Succeeded by Mihailo Gavrilović
Preceded by Kosta Taušanović	President of the National Assembly; 1889-1891	Succeeded by Dimitrije Katić
Preceded by Živan Živanović	President of the National Assembly; 1893-1894	Succeeded by Svetomir Nikolajević
Preceded by Milutin Garašanin	President of the National Assembly; 1897	Succeeded by Sima Nestorović
Preceded by Živko Karabiberović	Mayor of Belgrade; 1889-1891	Succeeded by Milovan Marinković
Preceded by Nikola Stepanović	Mayor of Belgrade; 1897	Succeeded by Nikola Stepanović
Preceded by Dušan Stefanović	Minister of Army; Acting; 1914	Succeeded by Radovije Bojović
Party political offices
Preceded by Post established	President of the People's Radical Party; 1881–1926	Succeeded by Aca Stanojević
