= List of cabinets led by Nikola Pašić =

Nikola Pašić led 22 governments in his capacity as prime minister of Serbia and prime minister of Yugoslavia.

== List of cabinets ==
Cabinet	Duration	Parties
Kingdom of Serbia
Pašić I	11 February 1891 – 21 March 1892	
Pašić II	21 March 1892 – 9 August 1892	
Pašić III	10 December 1904 – 9 May 1905	
Pašić IV	30 April 1906 – 12 June 1907	
Pašić V	12 June 1907 – 12 April 12 1908	
Pašić VI	12 April 1908 – 20 July 1908	
Pašić VII	24 October 1909 – 7 July 1911	
Pašić VIII	12 September 1912 – 5 December 1914	
Pašić IX	5 December 1914 – 23 June 1917	
Pašić X	23 June 1917 – 13 March 1918	
Pašić XI	13 March 1918 – 3 November 1918	
Pašić XII	3 November 1918 – 20 December 1918	
Yugoslavia
Pašić XIII	1 January 1921 – 26 March 1921	
Pašić XIV	26 March 1921 – 24 December 1921	
Pašić XV	24 December 1921 – 16 December 1922	
Pašić XVI	16 December 1922 – 2 May 1923	
Pašić XVII	2 May 1923 – 27 March 1924	
Pašić XVIII	27 March 1924 – 21 May 1924	
Pašić XIX	21 May 1924 – 27 July 1924	
Pašić XX	6 November 1924 – 29 April 1925	
Pašić XXI	29 April 1925 – 18 July 1925	
Pašić XXII	18 July 1925 – 8 April 1926	

== See also ==
- Government of Serbia
- List of cabinets of Yugoslavia
