= Stabbing =

Wounding with a pointed object at close range

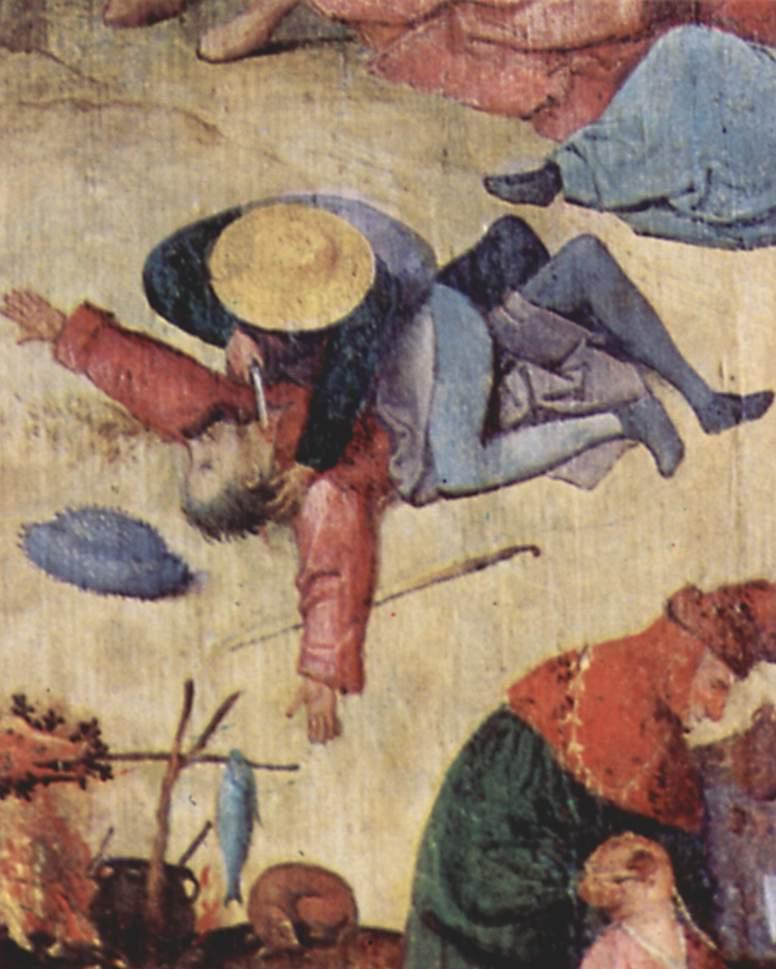
A detail from The Haywain Triptych by Hieronymus Bosch

A stabbing is penetration or rough contact with a sharp or pointed object at close range. Stab connotes purposeful action, as by an assassin or murderer, but it is also possible to accidentally stab oneself or others. Stabbing differs from slashing or cutting in that the motion of the object used in a stabbing generally moves perpendicular to and directly into the victim's body, rather than being drawn across it.

Stab wounds is the specific form of penetrating trauma to the skin that results from stabbing. Stabbings have been common among gangs and in prisons because knives are cheap, easy to acquire (or manufacture), easily concealable and relatively effective. Stabbing has also been used in terrorism.

== Epidemiology ==
In 2013, about 8 million stabbings occurred worldwide.

In the US in 2020, 9% of the 22,429 homicides involved a sharp instrument; of these a larger proportion of females used a sharp instrument (13%) versus males (8.2%).

== History ==
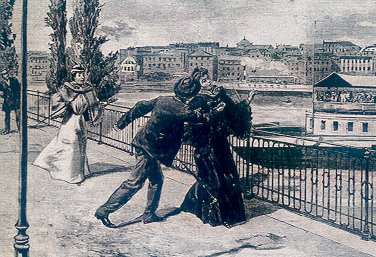
After being attacked and stabbed in September 1898, Austro-Hungarian Empress Elisabeth of Bavaria boarded a ship, unaware of the severity of her condition as consequence of an acute stress reaction. Bleeding to death from a puncture wound to the heart, Elisabeth's last words were, "What happened to me?"

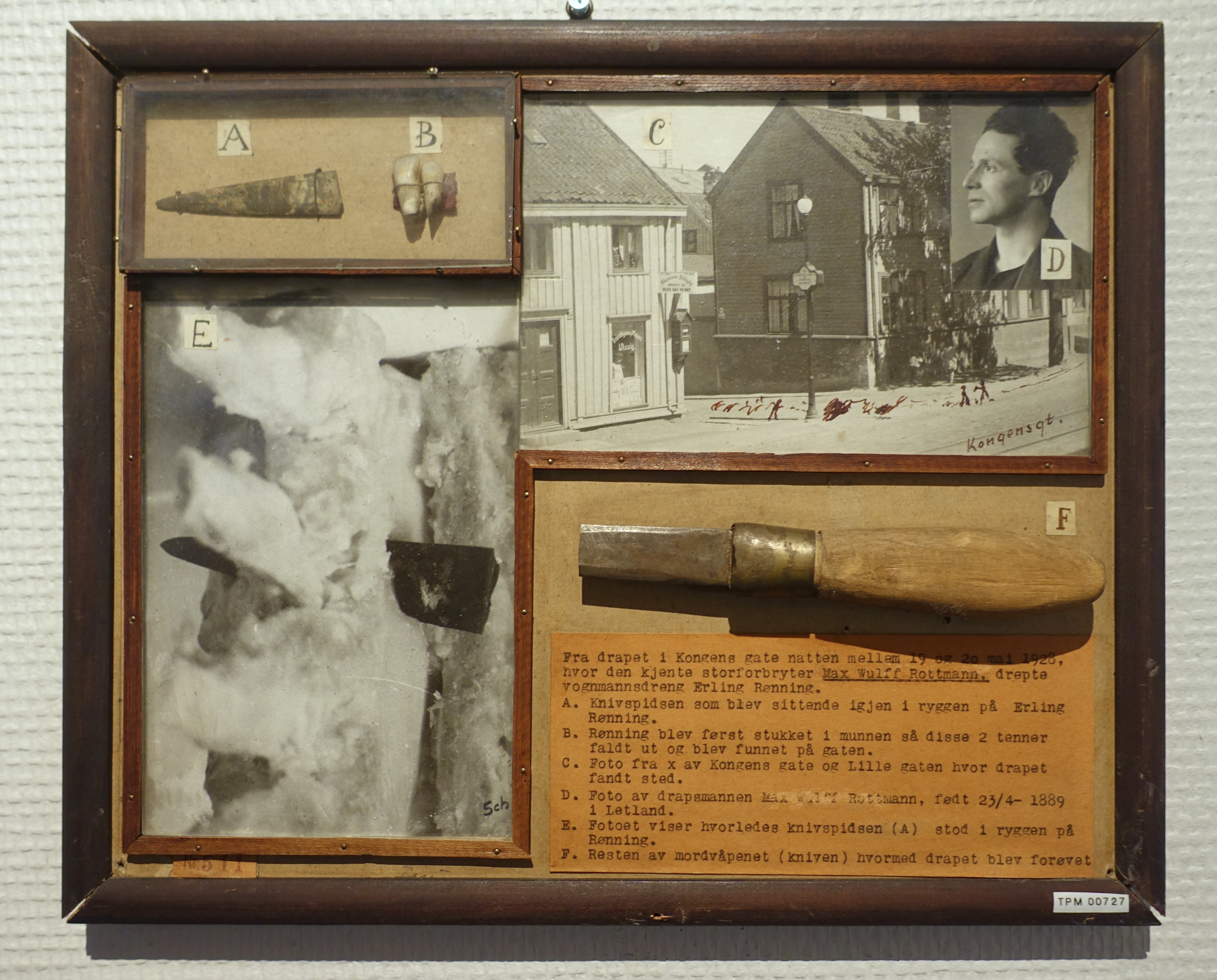
Murder weapon, evidence and photos from a murder case in Trondheim, Norway 1928. The broken blade of the knife was stuck in the back of the stabbed victim. Exhibits in the Norwegian National Museum of Criminal Justice.

Stabbings have been common throughout human history and were the means used to assassinate a number of distinguished historical figures, such as Second Caliph Umar and Roman dictator Julius Caesar and emperor Caligula.

In Japan, the historical practice of stabbing oneself deliberately in ritual suicide is known as seppuku (more colloquially hara-kiri, literally "belly-cutting" since it involves cutting open the abdomen). The ritual is highly codified, and the person committing suicide is assisted by a "second" who is entrusted to decapitate him cleanly (and thus expedite death and prevent an undignified spectacle) once he has made the abdominal wound.

A notable stabbing was the 13 November 1893 stabbing by anarchist Léon Léauthier. This attack is considered a foundational event of modern terrorism because Léauthier targeted a complete stranger; he was thus acting within the emerging logic of indiscriminate and mass terrorism.

== Mechanism ==
The human skin has a somewhat elastic property as a self-defense; when the human body is stabbed by a thin object such as a small kitchen knife, the skin often closes tightly around the object and closes again if the object is removed, which can trap some blood within the body. It has thus been speculated that the fuller, an elongated concave depression in a metal blade, functions to let blood out of the body in order to cause more damage. This misconception has led to fullers becoming widely known as "blood grooves". The fuller is actually a structural reinforcement of the blade similar in design to a metal I-beam used in construction. However, internal bleeding is just as dangerous as external bleeding; if enough blood vessels are severed to cause serious injury, the skin's elasticity will do nothing to prevent blood from exiting the circulatory system and accumulating uselessly in other parts of the body.

Death from stabbing is caused by shock, severe blood loss, infection, or loss of function of an essential organ such as the heart and/or lungs.

== Medical treatment ==
Although previously a victim of abdominal stabbing would be subject to exploratory surgery laparotomy, it is now considered safe not to operate if the patient is stable. In that case, they should be observed for signs of decompensation indicating a serious injury. If the patient initially presents stabbing injuries and is unstable, then laparotomy should be initiated to discover and rectify any internal injury.

== Autopsy examination ==
When someone who has sustained a stab wound dies, the body is autopsied and the wound is inspected by a forensic pathologist. Such examination can yield valuable information about the weapon used to produce the injury. From the external appearance and internal findings, the pathologist will usually be able to offer opinion about the dimensions of the weapon including the width and minimum possible length of the blade. It is possible to determine whether the weapon was single edged or double edged.

Sometimes factors like the taper of the blade and movement of knife in the wound can also be determined. Bruises or abrasions may give information about the guard.

== See also ==
- Stabbing as a terrorist tactic
- Wound
- Impalement
- Mass stabbing

== Bibliography ==
- Ferragu, Gilles (2019), "L'écho des bombes : l'invention du terrorisme « à l'aveugle » (1893-1895)" [The echo of bombs: The invention of indiscriminate terrorism (1893–1895)], Ethnologie française, 49 (1): 21–31, doi:10.3917/ethn.191.0021
