= Cabinet of Nikola Pašić VIII =

- 46th Cabinet of Kingdom of Serbia
- 1912–1914
- Coat of arms of Kingdom of Serbia
- Date formed: September 12, 1912
- Date dissolved: December 5, 1914

People and organisations
- Head of state: Peter I
- Head of government: Nikola Pašić

History
- Election: April 14, 1912
- Predecessor: Cabinet of Marko Trifković
- Successor: Cabinet of Nikola Pašić IX

After the 1912 Parliamentary Election, a Caretaker Government had to be formed quickly because of the sudden death of the Prime Minister Milovan Milovanović. Marko Trifković of the People's Radical Party was asked to lead it, because Nikola Pašić, the leader of this party was in Russia at the time. On August 29 (in the Old Calendar; September 11 in the New Calendar), Trifković was summoned to the Royal Court by King Peter I, who told him that he has accepted the resignation of the cabinet, and that he had entrusted the formation of the new cabinet to Pašić.

The New Cabinet of Nikola Pašić consisted only of Ministers from the People's Radical Party. Right from the start, it was clear that the cabinet would not be able to function normally with such a small majority in the National Assembly. Also, new election was out of the question because Serbia, along with the other members of the Balkan league, planned a war with the Ottoman Empire. Therefore, a strong majority in the Parliament had to be secured. Because of this, Pašić was forced to reconcile with the Radical dissidents in the Parliament, which is the main reason why Marko Trifković, a strong opponent of collaboration with the dissidents, couldn't find a place in the new cabinet. The Independent Radical Party refused a coalition with Pašić's Radical Party, but has promised to support the new cabinet's foreign policy.

The Ministers of the New Cabinet started performing their duties on August 31, 1912 (September 13 in the New Calendar).

This cabinet saw two Balkan Wars, in which Serbia almost doubled its size with the territories which were at the time considered Old Serbia (Kosovo, Metohija and Vardar Macedonia). They were reconquered after five centuries of Ottoman rule. Nikola Pašić and his cabinet clashed with some military structures about the handling of the newly acquired territories. Pašić believed the area should be included into the Serbian political and administrative system through the democratic elections, while the army sought to keep the areas under military occupation. After one year of tension, Pašić dismissed the military administrator of Old Serbia and scheduled new elections for 1914, but the outbreak of World War I prevented it.

In this war, Serbian defeat was considered to be imminent, at least by external onlookers, compared to the strength of the Austria-Hungary. Serbia had prepared well, however, and after a series of battles in 1914 (Battle of Cer, Battle of Kolubara), the loss and recapture of Belgrade, and a Serbian counter-offensive with occupation of some Austrian territories with huge Serbian population (in Syrmia and eastern Bosnia), the Austro-Hungarian army backed off. On July 5 1914, things changed as old King Peter I relinquished his duties to the heir apparent Alexander, making him his regent.

On 17 September 1914, Pašić and Albanian leader Essad Pasha Toptani signed in Niš the secret Treaty of Serbian-Albanian Alliance. The treaty had 15 points which focused on setting up joint Serbian-Albanian political and military institutions and military alliance of Albania and Kingdom of Serbia. Also treaty envisaged building of the rail-road to Durrës, a financial and military support of Kingdom of Serbia to Essad Pasha's position of Albanian ruler and drawing of the demarcation by special Serbo-Albanian commission. In October 1914, Essad Pasha returned to Albania. With Italian and Serbian financial backing, he established armed forces in Dibër and captured the interior of Albania and Dures. Pašić ordered that his followers be aided with money and arms.

On December 5, 1914, Nikola Pašić formed a new cabinet.

== Cabinet members ==
Position	Portfolio	Name	Image	In Office
Prime Minister	General Affairs	Nikola Pašić		Sep 12, 1912 - Dec 5, 1914
Minister	Foreign Affairs	Nikola Pašić		Sep 12, 1912 - Dec 5, 1914
Minister	Internal Affairs	Stojan Protić		Sep 12, 1912 - Dec 5, 1914
Minister	Finance	Lazar Paču		Sep 12, 1912 - Dec 5, 1914
Minister	Education and Church Affairs	Ljubomir Jovanović		Sep 12, 1912 - Dec 5, 1914
Minister	Justice	Mihailo Polićević		Sep 12, 1912 - Aug 31, 1913
Minister	Justice	Marko Đuričić		Aug 31, 1913 - Dec 5, 1914
Minister	Army	Radomir Putnik		Sep 12, 1912 - Oct 2, 1912
Minister	Army	Radivoje Bojović		Oct 2, 1912 - Jan 16, 1913
Minister	Army	Miloš Božanović		Jan 16, 1913 - Jan 17, 1914
Minister	Army	Dušan Stefanović		Jan 17, 1914 - Dec 5, 1914
Minister	Construction	Jovan Jovanović Pižon; Also Acting Minister of People's Economy; Aug 31 - Sep 1, 1913		Sep 12, 1912 - Sep 20, 1914
Minister	Construction	Andra Stanić		Nov 3, 1914 - Dec 5, 1914
Minister	People's Economy	Kosta Stojanović		Sep 12, 1912 - Aug 31, 1913
Minister	People's Economy	Velizar Janković; Also Acting Minister of Construction; Sep 20 - Nov 3, 1914		Sep 1, 1913 - Dec 5, 1914

== See also ==
- Nikola Pašić
- Cabinet of Serbia
