= Ljubomir Jovanović =

Serbian politician and historian (1865–1928)

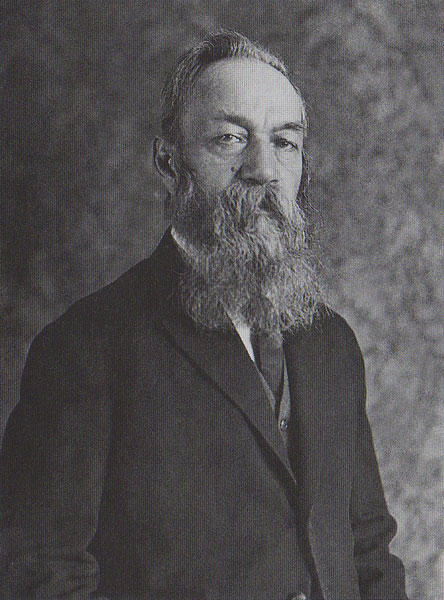

Minister of Internal Affairs
- In office 1914–1918
- Prime Minister: Nikola Pašić
- Preceded by: Stojan Protić
- Succeeded by: Marko Trifković

Minister of Education and Church Affairs
- In office 1911–1914
- Prime Minister: Milovan Milovanović, Marko Trifković, Nikola Pašić
- Preceded by: Jaša Prodanović
- Succeeded by: Ljubomir Davidović

Personal details
- Born: 14 February 1865 Kotor, Montenegro
- Died: 2 October 1928 (aged 63) Belgrade, Kingdom of SCS
- Education: University of Belgrade
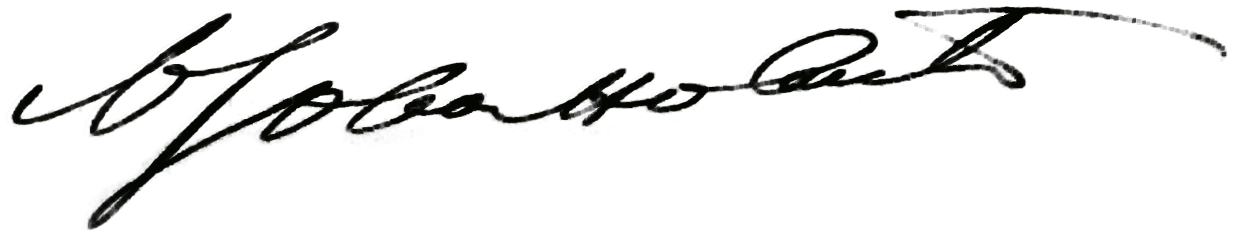
- Signature

Ljubomir Jovanović (Serbian Cyrillic: Љубомир Јовановић, 14 February 1865 – 2 October 1928) was a Serbian politician and historian. He was a professor at the University of Belgrade since its establishment in 1905, a member of the SKU, Minister of Education, Minister of Internal Affairs, and member of the State Council.

== Life ==
Jovanović was born in Kotor, Austrian Empire (present-day Montenegro). He finished primary and secondary school in Kotor. He was educated at the Belgrade Velika škola, during which he left to participate in the uprising in the Bay of Kotor. He graduated in history at the Faculty of Philosophy. From 1887 to 1901, he was a teacher at secondary schools.

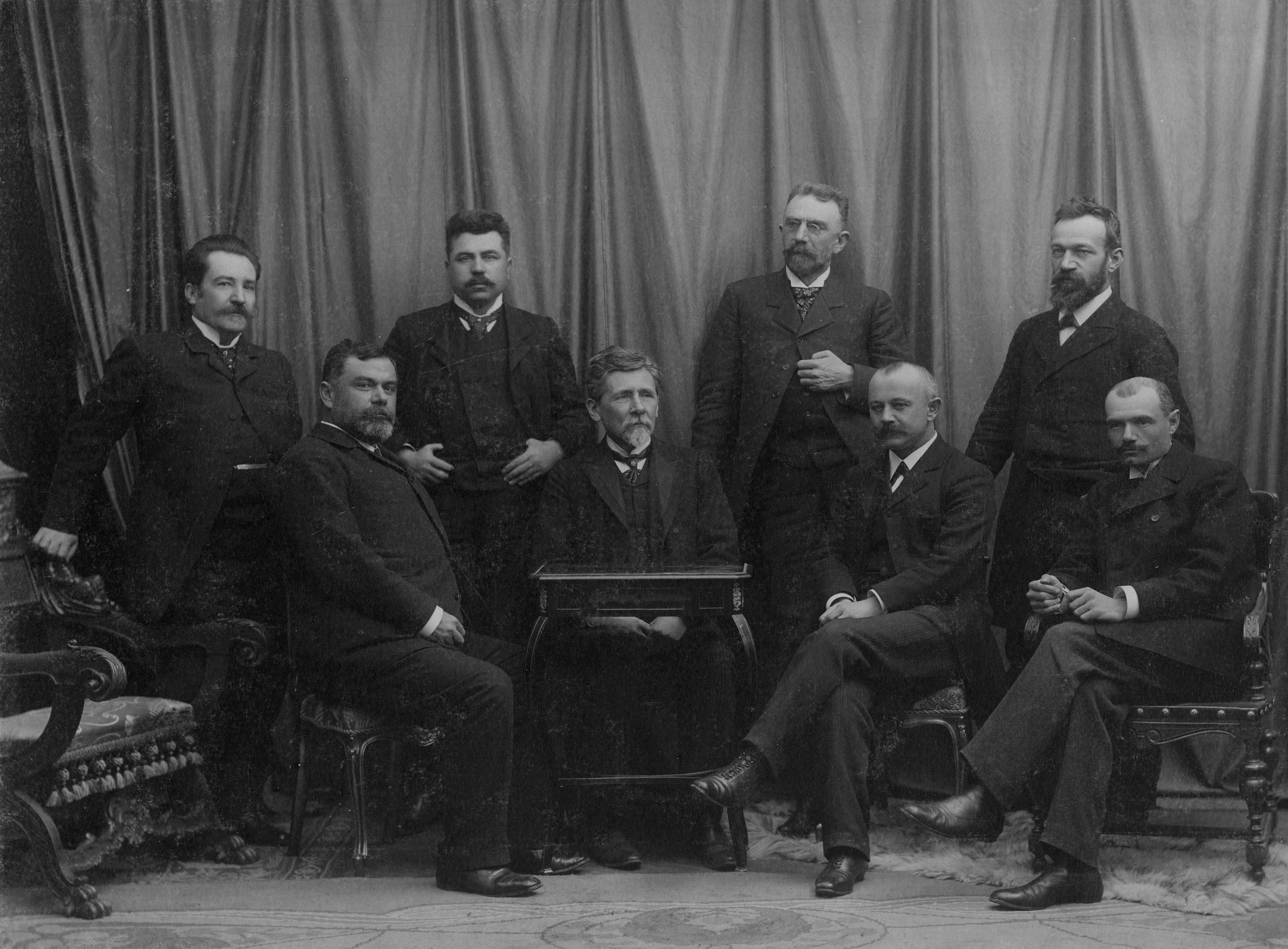
First professors of the University of Belgrade (1905).

He was a librarian and Director of the National Library, then professor at the Velika škola and later when it became the University of Belgrade.

== See also ==
- Jovan Žujović
- Sima Lozanić
- Mihailo Petrović Alas

Government offices
Preceded by Jaša Prodanović	Minister of Education and Church Affairs; 1911–1914	Succeeded by Ljubomir Davidović
Preceded by Stojan Protić	Minister of Internal Affairs; 1914–1918	Succeeded by Marko Trifković
Cultural offices
Preceded by Stojan Protić	Director of National Library of Serbia; 1900–1903	Succeeded by Jovan Tomić
