= Mihailo Gavrilović =

Serbian historian and diplomat

PhD Mihailo Gavrilović
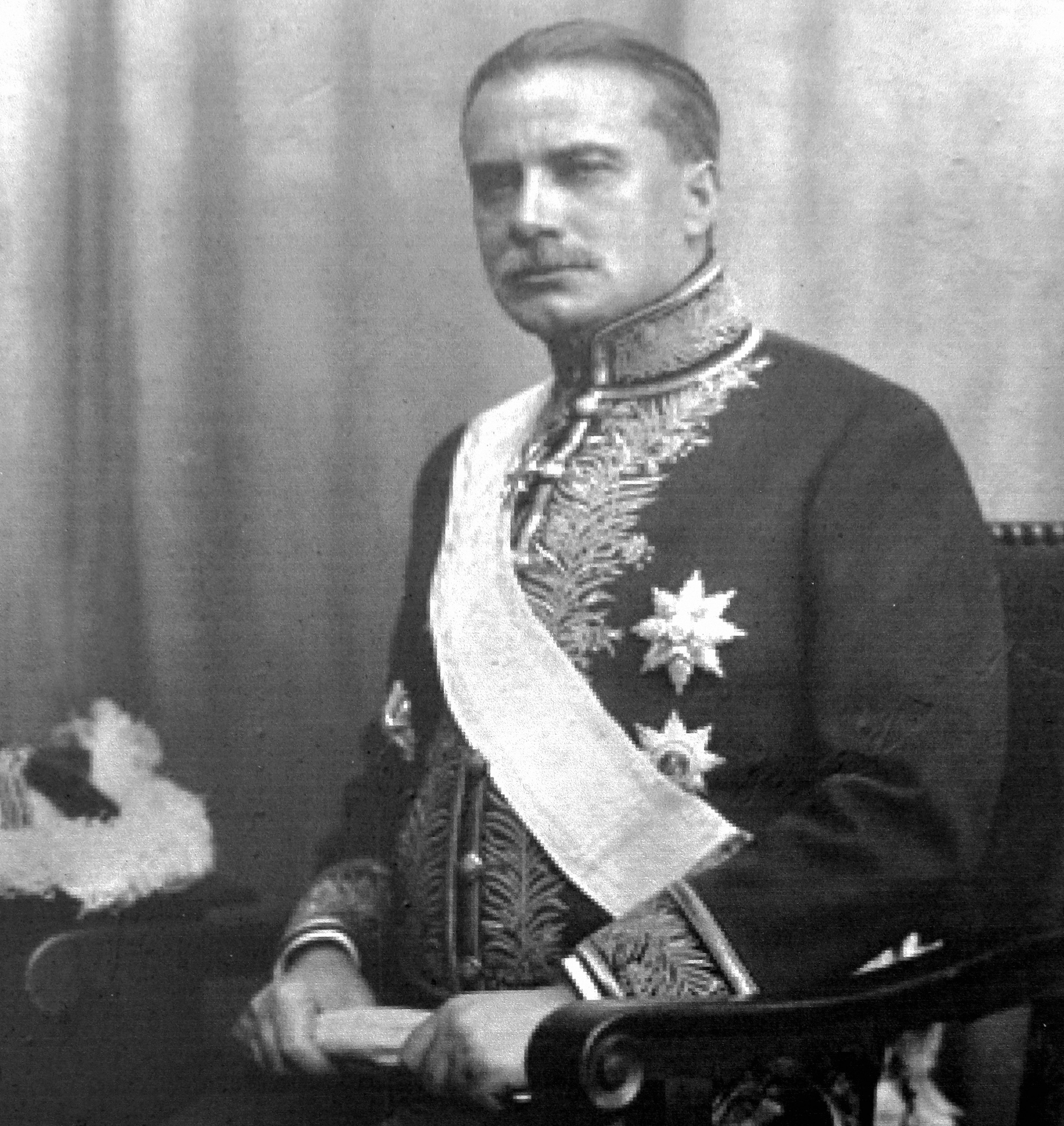
- Born: 18 May 1868; Aleksinac, Principality of Serbia
- Died: November 1, 1924 (aged 56); London, United Kingdom
- Awards: Order of Saint Sava
- Scientific career
- Fields: History
- Workplaces: University of Belgrade

Mihailo Gavrilović (Serbian Cyrillic: Михаило Гавриловић; May 8, 1868 – November 1, 1924) was a Serbian historian and diplomat.

== Early life ==
Mihailo Gavrilović was born at Aleksinac in central Serbia on May 8, 1868 (Old Style). He completed high school in Niš and graduated from the department of Philosophy at the University of Belgrade before embarking on an academic career. From 1900 to 1910, he was the Director of the Serbian State Archives.

== Scholarly career ==
Gavrilović studied history at the Velika škola in Belgrade and graduated in 1891, and defended his thesis on medieval history at the University of Paris-Sorbonne in 1899. During his years in Paris (1893–1900) Gavrilović prepared a huge volume of French documents concerning the First Serbian Uprising, under Karađorđe (1804–1813), that was published in the French language in a single volume in 1904 (Ispisi iz pariskih arhiva. Građa za istoriju srpskog ustanka), in Belgrade by the Serbian Royal Academy. After returning to Serbia from Paris, Gavrilović was appointed Director of the Archives of Serbia and contributed greatly to its organization as a modern archival institution.

Gavrilović researched nineteenth-century Serbian history and wrote extensively on the main political figures of the time (i.e. Miloš Obrenović), Franco-Serbian relations during the Napoleonic era and the Serbian revolution (1804–1813) and Serbo-British relations in the 1840s and 1850s, as well as on international relations concerning the Serbian question. His three-volume biography of Prince Miloš Obrenović is a standard in Serbian historiography. The work is particularly valuable for its treatment of the diplomatic relations of Serbia with the European Powers. It carries the story of Prince Miloš down to 1835, and a fourth volume was to have dealt with the close of his first reign, his exile and his triumphant return in 1858. But unhappily the material which Gavrilović had amassed during the years of study and which would have enabled him to complete the work without much further effort, was irretrievably lost in a trunk which accompanied him during the painful retreat of the Serbian Army through Albania in the First World War (1915–1916), now remembered as the epic ”Albanian Golgotha“.

Using Austrian and Russian sources as well, Gavrilović, renowned for his methodical analysis and wider perspective on general historical developments, was considered the leading Serbian expert for diplomatic history. Gavrilović was elected a member of the Serbian Royal Academy in 1914.

== Diplomatic career ==
Gavrilović was Serbian envoy to Cetinje (1910–1914), and was reassigned in 1914 as Serbian Envoy to the Holy See. During his stay in Rome, he searched the archives of the Vatican, collecting documents concerning Serbian history. In 1917, while the Serbian government-in-exile was located at Corfu, in Greece (1916–1918), Gavrilović was appointed Deputy Minister of Foreign Affairs, and, later on, served as acting Minister of Foreign Affairs (March 10 to November 3, 1918). After the Yugoslav unification in December 1918, Gavrilović was appointed as Envoy of Kingdom of Serbs, Croats and Slovenes to London. As a diplomat Gavrilović was equally successful as in his scholarly pursuits, developing an important network of ties with officials in states where he represented the Kingdom of Serbia and its successor, The Kingdom of Serbs, Croats and Slovenes (1919–1924). He was awarded the Order of Saint Sava for his work. He died in London.

== Selected works ==
- Étude sur le traité de Paris de 1259, entre Louis IX, roi de France, et Henri III, roi d’Angleterre, Librairie Émile Bouillon, Paris 1899.
- Spoljašnja politika Srbije u XIX veku, Belgrade, 1901.
- Srpski pokret i rusko-francuski odnosi 1804-1807, Belgrade, 1901.
- Ispisi iz pariskih arhiva (Građa za istoriju srpskog ustanka), Serbian Royal Academy, Belgrade, 1904.
- Miloš Obrenović, vol. I-III, [vol. I (1813–1820), vol. II (1821–1826), vol. 3 (1827–1835)], Nova štamparija Davidović, Izdanje Zadužbine I. M. Kolarca, Belgrade, 1908-1912 (reprinted by Slovo Ljubve, Belgrade 1978 and 1992), 579+758+661 pp.
- Iz nove srpske istorije, Srpska književna zadruga, Belgrade 1926, 209 p. (Introduction by Slobodan Jovanović)

Government offices
Preceded by Nikola Pašić	Minister of Foreign Affairs; 1918	Succeeded by Stojan Protić
