= Library of Veliko Tarnovo =

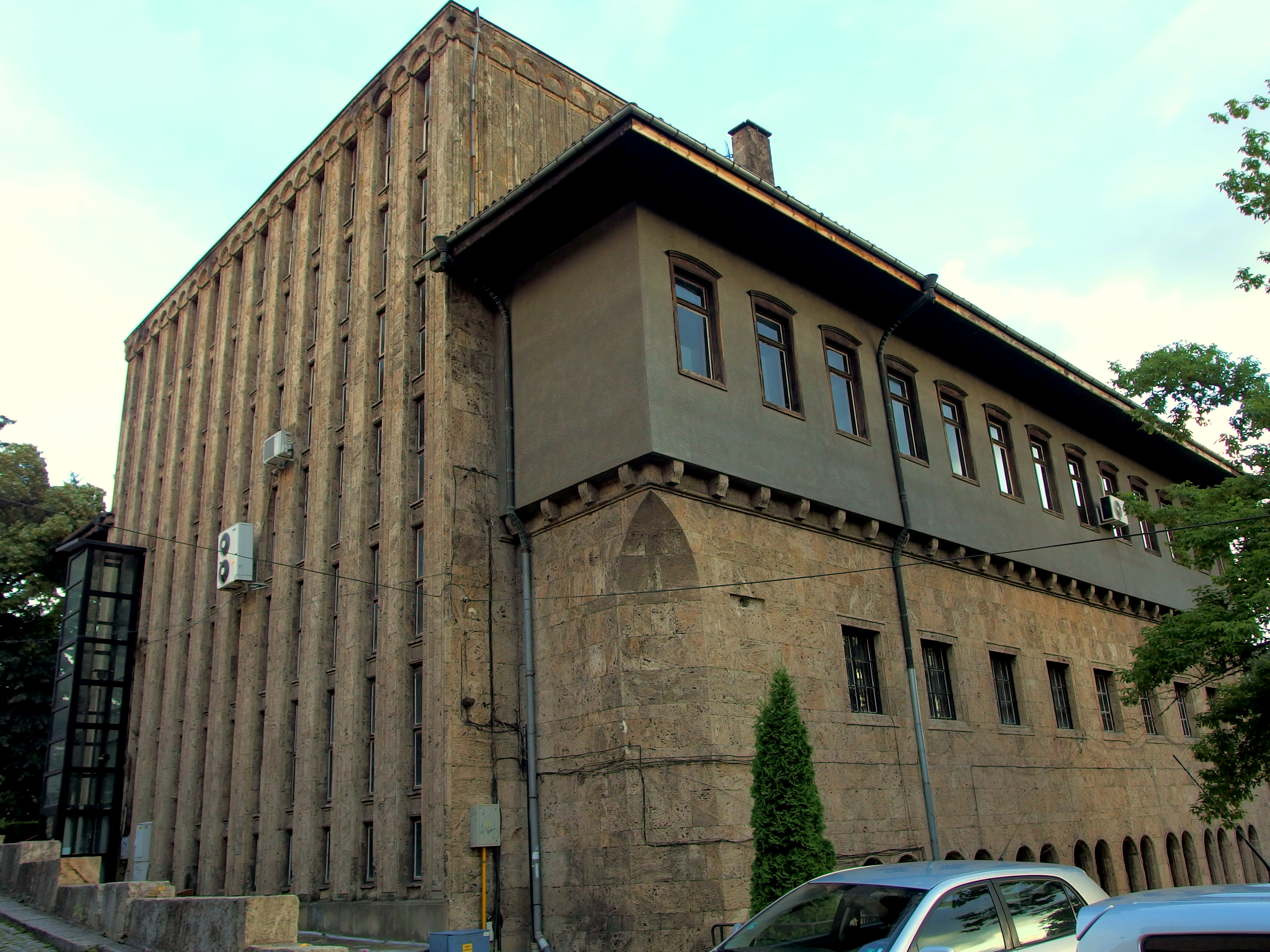
20140620 Veliko Tarnovo 394

The Library of Veliko Tarnovo is the third largest library in Bulgaria.

== History ==
=== Old Bulgarian Library in Tarnovo ===
During the period of Ottoman rule in Bulgaria, many valuable books and manuscripts from the Second Bulgarian State were stored in churches in Tarnovo. According to legend, following the conquest of Tarnovo, the books and manuscripts were hidden in the Patriarchal Church of St. Peter and Paul, along with concealed royal letters and contracts, many of them inscribed and decorated with miniatures. Later a Hellenic bishop found the artifacts and ordered that they be burned, which supposedly took days to accomplish.

=== "Petko R. Slaveykov" Regional National Library ===
The Old Bulgarian Library in Tarnovo was burnt down in 1872. The "Petko R. Slaveikov" National Library was built to replace it, the third Bulgarian National Library in existence after the Metropolitan Library and the Ivan Vazov National Library. The idea of opening a library in Tarnovo is credited to Stilian Chilingirov, the then director of the Library in Sofia. The library opened on 15 August 1922. It was originally housed in the Angel Popov building. Mosk'o Moskov served as its first director.

=== Name changes ===
The complex has housed a museum and a library, with construction beginning in the 1940s. The library was renamed the Regional Methodological Library - Veliko Tarnovo in 1953, and later renamed again to the Petko Rachov Slaveikov National Library in 1958. In 1979, the Library's Methodology department grew into the Libraries Directorate at the Regional Council for Culture in Veliko Tarnovo and managed the Territorial Library System. In 1971, the library was awarded the Cyril and Methodius Order I for its 50th anniversary. The Regional Library collaborates with the city of Linz.
