= Mihailo Kr. Đorđević =

Serbian lawyer, politician, and diplomat

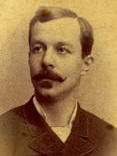
- Born: 16 March 1850; Kragujevac, Principality of Serbia
- Died: 3 January 1901 (aged 50); Belgrade, Kingdom of Serbia
- Occupations: politician, diplomat, lawyer

Mihailo Kr. Đorđević (Serbian Cyrillic: Михаило Кр. Ђорђевић; 1850–1901) was a Serbian lawyer, politician and diplomat who served as the Minister of Foreign Affairs of the Kingdom of Serbia from 11 February 1891 to 21 March 1892.

== Biography ==
Mihailo Kr. Đorđević was born in 1850 in Kragujevac which at the time was part of the Principality of Serbia.

He performed the functions of the Minister of Foreign Affairs, the Minister of Justice, the Minister of Internal Affairs, and was also the Deputy Minister of Education of the Kingdom of Serbia.

He was a plenipotentiary minister in Paris (where he was wounded with a knife in the 13 November 1893 stabbing, according to the attacker "because he looked bourgeois" and the attacker was an anarchist, Léon Léauthier) and Bucharest. He was also a state adviser.

Đorđević died in 1901 in Belgrade.

Government offices
Preceded by Sava Grujić	Minister of Foreign Affairs; 1891–1892	Succeeded by Nikola Pašić
