= Kosta Hristić =

Serbian politician (1852–1927)

Minister of Justice
- In office 1897–1899
- Monarch: Aleksandar Obrenović

Personal details
- Born: 10 April 1852 Belgrade, Serbia
- Died: 5 March 1927 (aged 74) Belgrade, Yugoslavia

Kosta Hristić (April 10, 1852 – March 5, 1927) was a Serbian lawyer, diplomat and Minister of Justice.

== Biography ==
Kosta was born in Belgrade. His father Nikola Hristić (1818–1911) was a Minister and the Prime Minister of Serbia, and his mother Juliana, born Hadži Jovanović, was a granddaughter of Toma Vučić Perišić. He finished elementary school and high school in Terazije. He graduated from Belgrade Faculty of Law, and then studied law in Germany (Berlin, Heidelberg 1872) and France.

Hristić worked at the court of Valjevo for three years, and then at the Urban Belgrade court. After that, he was Secretary of the Serbian embassy in Constantinople (1883), Consul in Thessaloniki (1889–1890), and chief at the Ministry of Foreign Affairs (in 1888 and 1894). He was also a representative of the Kingdom of Serbia in Bucharest (1895), Rome (1899) and Vienna (1900–1903), and Minister of Justice in Vladan Đorđević's government (1897–1899).

Government offices
Preceded by Milovan Milovanović	Minister of Justice of Serbia; 1897–1899	Succeeded by Đorđe Stefanović
