= List of cabinets of Yugoslavia =

The following is a list of government cabinets of Yugoslavia.

== List of cabinets ==
| No. | Cabinet | From | Parties |
|---|---|---|---|
| 1. | Cabinet of Nikola Pašić I | 1 December 1918 | NRS |
| 2. | Cabinet of Stojan Protić I | 20 December 1918 | NRS — DS |
| 3. | Cabinet of Ljubomir Davidović I | 16 August 1919 | DS |
| 4. | Cabinet of Stojan Protić II | 19 February 1920 | NRS |
| 5. | Cabinet of Milenko Vesnić | 16 May 1920 | NRS |
| 6. | Cabinet of Nikola Pašić II | 1 January 1921 | NRS — DS |
| 7. | Cabinet of Nikola Pašić III | 24 December 1921 | NRS — DS |
| 8. | Cabinet of Nikola Pašić IV | 16 December 1922 | NRS — DS — JMO |
| 9. | Cabinet of Nikola Pašić V | 1 May 1923 | NRS — JMO |
| 10. | Cabinet of Nikola Pašić VI | 27 March 1924 | NRS — JMO |
| 11. | Cabinet of Nikola Pašić VII | 21 May 1924 | NRS — JMO |
| 12. | Cabinet of Ljubomir Davidović II | 28 July 1924 | DS — SLS — JMO |
| 13. | Cabinet of Nikola Pašić VIII | 6 November 1924 | NRS — SDS — HRSS |
| 14. | Cabinet of Nikola Pašić IX | 29 April 1925 | NRS — SDS — HRSS |
| 15. | Cabinet of Nikola Uzunović I | 8 April 1926 | NRS — HRSS |
| 16. | Cabinet of Nikola Uzunović II | 1 February 1927 | NRS |
| 17. | Cabinet of Velimir Vukićević I | 17 April 1927 | NRS — DS — JMO — SLS |
| 18. | Cabinet of Velimir Vukićević II | 2 February 1928 | NRS — DS — JMO — SLS |
| 19. | Cabinet of Anton Korošec | 28 July 1928 | NRS — DS — JMO — SLS |
| 20. | Cabinet of Petar Živković | 7 January 1929 | 6 January Dictatorship |
| 21. | Cabinet of Vojislav Marinković | 4 April 1932 | JRSD |
| 22. | Cabinet of Milan Srškić I | 3 July 1932 | JRSD |
| 23. | Cabinet of Milan Srškić II | 5 November 1932 | JNS |
| 24. | Cabinet of Nikola Uzunović III | 27 January 1934 | JNS |
| 25. | Cabinet of Bogoljub Jevtić | 22 December 1934 | JRZ |
| 26. | Cabinet of Milan Stojadinović I | 24 June 1935 | JRZ |
| 27. | Cabinet of Milan Stojadinović II | 7 March 1936 | JRZ |
| 28. | Cabinet of Milan Stojadinović III | 4 October 1937 | JRZ |
| 29. | Cabinet of Dragiša Cvetković I | 5 February 1939 | JRZ |
| 30. | Cabinet of Dragiša Cvetković II | 26 August 1939 | JRZ — HSS |
| 31. | Cabinet of Dušan Simović | 27 March 1941 | Yugoslav coup d'état |
| 37. | Provisional Government (Cabinet of Josip Broz Tito I) | 7 March 1945 | JNOF — DS — HSS |
| 38. | Cabinet of Josip Broz Tito II | 2 February 1946 | KPJ |
| 39. | Cabinet of Josip Broz Tito III | 27 April 1950 | KPJ |
| 40. | Cabinet of Josip Broz Tito IV | 17 January 1953 | SKJ |
| 41. | Cabinet of Josip Broz Tito V | 30 January 1955 | SKJ |
| 42. | Cabinet of Josip Broz Tito VI | 19 April 1958 | SKJ |
| 43. | Cabinet of Petar Stambolić | 29 June 1963 | SKJ |
| 44. | Cabinet of Mika Špiljak | 18 May 1967 | SKJ |
| 45. | Cabinet of Mitja Ribičič | 17 May 1969 | SKJ |
| 46. | Cabinet of Džemal Bijedić | 30 July 1971 | SKJ |
| 47. | Cabinet of Veselin Đuranović | 14 February 1977 | SKJ |
| 48. | Cabinet of Milka Planinc | 16 May 1982 | SKJ |
| 49. | Cabinet of Branko Mikulić | 15 May 1986 | SKJ |
| 50. | Cabinet of Ante Marković | 16 March 1989 | SKJ / SRS |
