= Veliki Izvor =

- suburb
- Location within Serbia
- Coordinates: 43°55′N 22°19′E
- Country: Serbia
- District: Zaječar District
- city: Zaječar

Population (2002)
  - Total: 2,684
- Time zone: UTC+1 (CET)
  - Summer (DST): UTC+2 (CEST)

Veliki Izvor is a suburb in the city of Zaječar, Serbia. According to the 2002 census, the town has a population of 2684 people.
