= Zvezdan (Zaječar) =

- suburb
- Location within Serbia
- Coordinates: 43°54′04″N 22°13′00″E
- Country: Serbia
- District: Zaječar District
- Municipality: Zaječar

Population (2002)
  - Total: 1,675
- Time zone: UTC+1 (CET)
  - Summer (DST): UTC+2 (CEST)

Zvezdan is a suburb in the city of Zaječar, located in eastern Serbia. According to the 2002 census, the settlement had a population of 1,675. The village is situated in the Crna Reka region.

The village was a site of operations in the First Serbian Uprising (1804–13).

== Sources ==
- Jovanović, Dragoljub K. (1883). "Црна река". Glasnik Srpskog učenog društva. 54: 187–256.
- Protić, Kosta (1893). "Ратни догађаји из првога српског устанка под Карађорђем Петровићем 1804—1813". Годишњица Николе Чупића. XIII. Državna štamparija: 285.
