= 13 November 1893 stabbing =

1893 anarchist stabbing in Paris

- Part of Ère des attentats
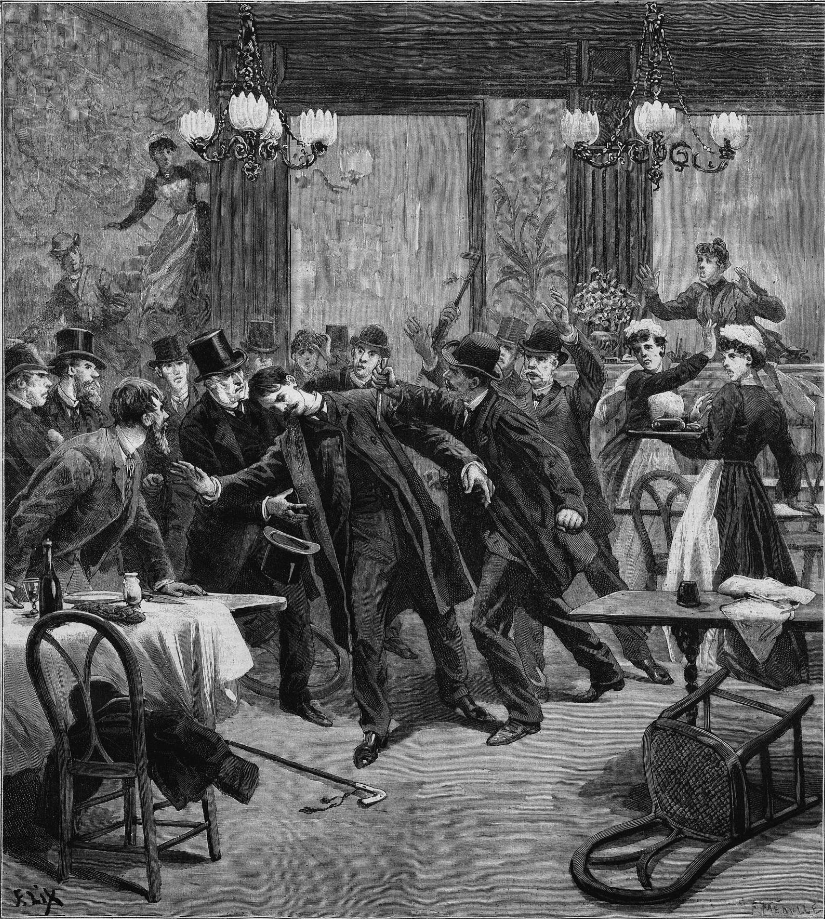
- Depiction of the 13 November stabbing in Le Petit Journal (2 December 1893)
- Location: 48°52′03″N 2°20′00″E; Paris
- Date: 13 November 1893
- Attack type: stabbing
- Deaths: 0
- Injuries: 1
- Perpetrator: Léon Léauthier
- No. of participants: 1
- Motive: Anarchism
- Verdict: Guilty and deported to a penal colony
- Convicted: 1

The 13 November 1893 stabbing was an attack carried out in Paris by the anarchist Léon Léauthier against Mihailo Kr. Đorđević, a Serbian diplomat targeted because 'he looked bourgeois'. The attack, which took place in the middle of the Ère des attentats (1892–1894), was carried out by the anarchist in response to his dismissal from his job as a shoemaker and the misery in which he found himself. It was one of the first acts of indiscriminate terrorism in history, occurring only six days after the Liceu bombing and a few months before the Café Terminus bombing, making it a foundational event for modern terrorism.

The victim ultimately survived his injuries, while Léauthier was sentenced to life imprisonment in a penal colony, where he was assassinated by the police in 1894.

== History ==
=== Context ===
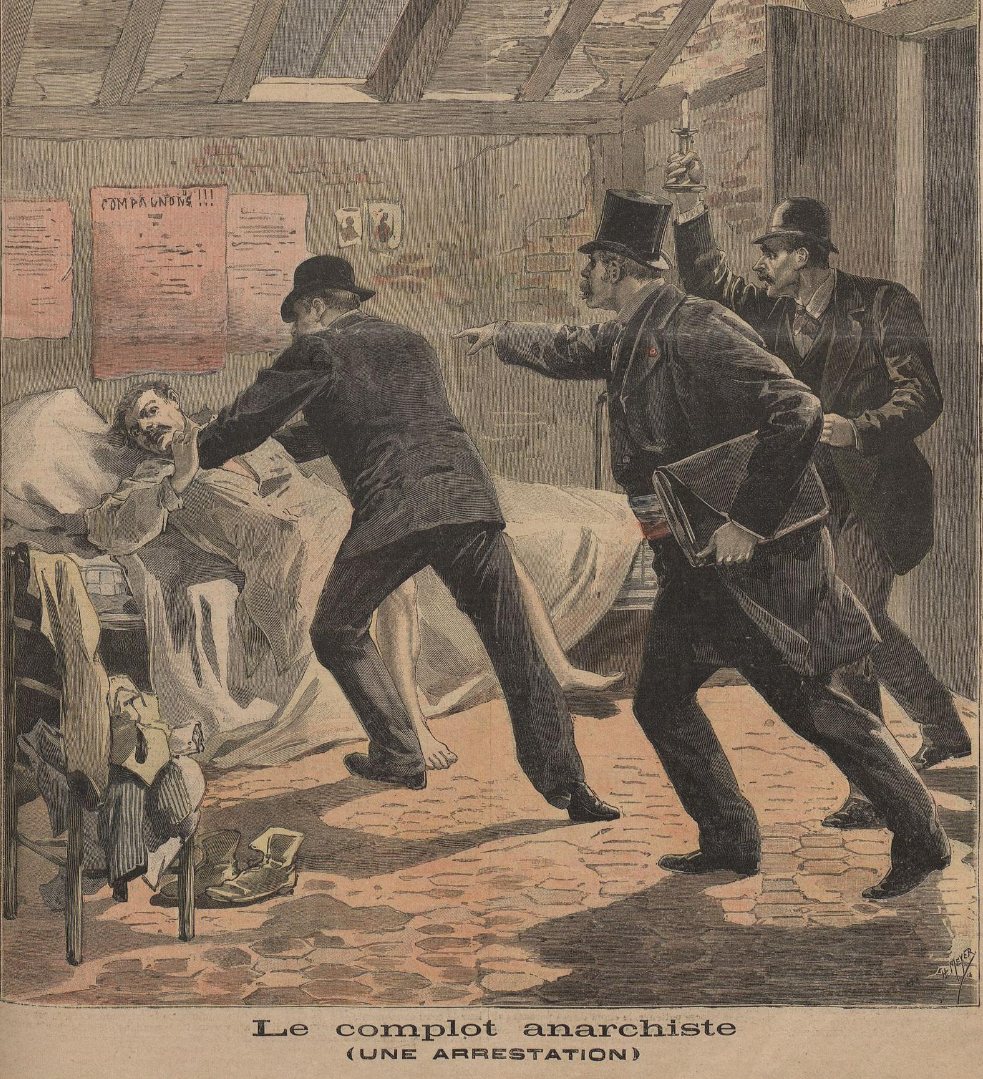
Representation of an anarchist arrest during the Ère des attentats, Le Petit Journal (3 June 1893)

In the 19th century, anarchism emerged and took shape in Europe before spreading. Anarchists advocate a struggle against all forms of domination perceived as unjust including economic domination brought forth by capitalism. They are particularly opposed to the State, seen as the organization that legitimizes these dominations through its police, army and propaganda.

In France, the already conflictual relations between anarchists and the French State, embodied by the Third Republic, entered a new period of intense tension: in 1891, the Fourmies shooting, where the army fired on demonstrators demanding an eight‑hour workday, and the Clichy affair, when anarchists were arrested, beaten and mistreated by the police, radicalized a number of anarchists in France. The fact that the anarchists arrested after the Clichy affair were tried with great severity – the prosecutor demanding the death penalty for the three and the judge handing down harsh prison sentences of three and five years – was an important catalyst for the advent of the Ère des attentats.

The attacks followed one another as repression against the anarchists intensified, and a young Léon Léauthier, an anarchist militant since the age of sixteen, found himself unemployed. He moved from Manosque to Paris, where he managed to get a job as a shoemaker—only to be dismissed at the end of September 1893. During this period, one of his anarchist companions, Plume (meaning 'Feather'), was arrested by the police.

=== Preparation and stabbing ===
After more than a month of unemployment, during which he managed to work as a shoemaker here and there to survive, he decided to take action. Léauthier sought to meet Sébastien Faure, whose conferences he had attended since childhood, during one of his speeches in early November 1893. However, he missed him and decided to write to him on 12 November 1893. In this letter, later used during his trial, he expressed his motives and the ideology underlying the attack he was about to carry out:

I find myself either starving to death or committing suicide. Well, no! I will choose neither. The first, because the stores are overflowing with goods; and the second, because I refuse to take my own life to avoid the shame of being a coward and a fool. One could not be more idiotic and senseless to kill oneself rather than strike at those responsible.
[...] I will take revenge however I can, not having the means to carry out a major act like the sublime companion Ravachol. My chosen weapon will be my tool of work, but what does it matter? It will still be a refinement to stab a bourgeois with the very tool that I used to produce what he consumes at my expense.
[...] I would very much like to choose, among others, a magistrate [precisely... however] I know neither their faces nor their addresses, but I will not strike an innocent by attacking the first bourgeois I come across.

The following evening, he went to dine at Bouillon Duval, located at 31 avenue de l'Opéra. There, he remained seated for about forty-five minutes after finishing his meal, staring blankly into space. Then, around 8:30 p.m., he stood up and stabbed a bourgeois in the chest as the man was leaving, knowing nothing about his identity. He drove the blade into his chest and fled, rushing into the street.

The victim, a Serbian minister plenipotentiary (roughly: ambassador) to France named Mihailo Kr. Đorđević, in French press recorded as "Rista Georgevitch" (possibly because of the middle name "Kristivoje", Serb version of Christopher), pulled the dagger from his chest quickly and was astonished to have been attacked by Léauthier, whom he did not know, exclaiming:

What is this? I don’t know him! This is too much! Quick, a doctor! A doctor!

The Serbian diplomat collapsed shortly after but did not die; he ultimately survived the attack. Shortly after, Léauthier turned himself in at the police station of the 11th arrondissement of Paris.

=== Aftermath ===
After turning himself in, Léauthier was incarcerated and put on trial. The trial, which lasted a single day, resulted in his sentence to life imprisonment in a penal colony. He was transferred there over the course of 1894 before being assassinated by the colonial and prison administration on 21 or 22 October 1894, during the massacre of the anarchists in the penal colony.

== Analysis ==
=== Birth of indiscriminate terrorism and modern terrorism ===
This attack holds crucial importance in the history of terrorism. Alongside the Liceu bombing, which took place a few days earlier, and the Café Terminus bombing, it was one of the first instances of indiscriminate terrorism in history. Gilles Ferragu described Léauthier's action as follows:

The first words of Rista Georgevitch, the Serbian minister in Paris, wounded on 13 November 1893 by the stabbing of an anarchist—Léauthier—express the diplomat's astonishment. Georgevitch was stabbed not for his official position but simply because he was a 'bourgeois'. [...] Léon Léauthier’s stabbing would thus be the first act of a new form of terrorism—new because it targeted the crowd, the masses, anonymously. This 13 November 1893 could mark the birth of modern terrorism in that it implicitly defines an objective enemy. Léauthier did not want to, or did not know how to, turn his act into a manifesto... A few months later, another anarchist, Émile Henry, would usher public opinion—now directly targeted—into the era of mass terrorism by declaring during his trial that he had 'struck at random'.

== Bibliography ==
- Bouhey, Vivien (2009), Les Anarchistes contre la République [The Anarchists against the Republic], Rennes: Presses universitaires de Rennes (PUR)
- Ferragu, Gilles (2019), "L'écho des bombes : l'invention du terrorisme « à l'aveugle » (1893-1895)" [The echo of bombs: The invention of indiscriminate terrorism (1893–1895)], Ethnologie française, 49 (1): 21–31, doi:10.3917/ethn.191.0021
- Frémion, Yves (2011), Léauthier l'anarchiste. De la propagande par le fait à la révolte des bagnards (1893-1894) [Léauthier the anarchist. From propaganda by the deed to the convicts' revolt (1893-1894)], Paris: L'Échappée, ISBN 9782915830477
- Jourdain, Edouard (2013). L'anarchisme [Anarchism]. Paris: La Découverte. ISBN 978-2-7071-9091-8.
- Merriman, John M. (2016). The dynamite club: how a bombing in fin-de-siècle Paris ignited the age of modern terror. Yale University Press. ISBN 978-0-300-21792-6.
- Ward, Colin (2004). Anarchism: A Very Short Introduction. Oxford University Press (OUP).
