= Stojan Protić =

Serbian politician & writer (1857–1923)

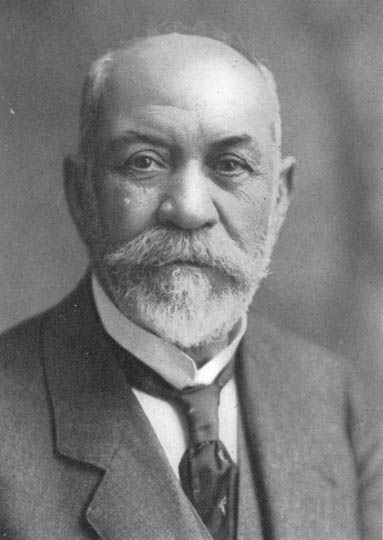

1st Prime Minister of Yugoslavia
- In office 19 February 1920 – 16 May 1920
- Monarch: Peter I
- Preceded by: Ljubomir Davidović
- Succeeded by: Milenko Vesnić
- In office 22 December 1918 – 16 August 1919
- Monarch: Peter I
- Preceded by: Nikola Pašić
- Succeeded by: Ljubomir Davidović

Personal details
- Born: 28 January 1857 Kruševac, Principality of Serbia
- Died: 28 October 1923 (aged 66) Belgrade, Kingdom of Serbs, Croats and Slovenes
- Party: People's Radical Party

Stojan Protić (Serbian Cyrillic: Стојан Протић; 28 January 1857 – 28 October 1923) was a Serbian politician and writer. He served as the prime minister of the Kingdom of Serbs, Croats, and Slovenes between 1918 and 1919, and again in 1920, later called Yugoslavia. He is best remembered as the key theoretician of Serbian parliamentarism.

== Biography ==
Stojan M. Protić was born in Kruševac. His great-great-grandfather (čukundeda), Toma Dečanac, moved from the village of Dečani to Kruševac with his wife and two sons.

Having studied history and philosophy in Belgrade's Velika škola, Protić briefly worked in government service before dedicating himself to journalism and becoming editor of Samouprava ("Autonomy"), the official daily newspaper of the People's Radical Party. In 1884, he became the editor of another paper, Odjek ("Echo"), and advocated changing Serbia's constitution. He ran in the 1887 elections and was elected to the Parliament. As secretary of the Constitutional committee in 1888 Protić participated in drafting the Serbian Constitution, perhaps one of the most liberal constitutions in late nineteenth-century Europe. He became an influential ideologist of the People's Radical Party and a talented journalist. He continued to write numerous articles for several political magazines while in the office.

Protić was often elected as a deputy of the People's Radical Party in the Serbian Parliament in the following years, 1887, 1897, 1901, 1903, 1905, 1906, 1908 and 1912. Known as an ardent polemist and advocate of British-type democracy, he served as a deputy in the first Yugoslav parliament (1920) as well.

He was the Minister of Interior in various governments in Serbia after 1903 (Administrations of Jovan Avakumović, Sava Grujić, Nikola Pašić), as well as the Minister of Finance (1909–1912). As the Minister of the Interior at the outbreak of World War I, he worked on the Serbian reply to the Austro-Hungarian Ultimatum during the July Crisis. He supported the Corfu Declaration (1917), opposed the Geneva Declaration (November 9, 1918), and sought to revise the Vidovdan Constitution. In December 1918, Protić was appointed the Prime Minister of the Kingdom of Serbs, Croats, and Slovenes by Prince-Regent Aleksandar Karađorđević. His government, unfortunately, lasted from 20 December 1918 to 16 August 1919. He was the Prime Minister once more from 19 February to 17 May 1920. In 1923, after leaving the Radicals, led by Pašić, he formed a new party the Independent Radical Party (Nezavisna Radikalna Stranka) but failed to gain support. After losing his parliamentary seat in his traditional constituency in Kruševac, Protić quit politics.

His books translated into English, German, Russian and French were published under the pseudonym "Balkanicus".

== Death ==
Protić died of heart disease in Belgrade in 1923.

His great-grandson is Milan St. Protić, a historian, politician and diplomat who served as the Mayor of Belgrade.

== Selected works ==
- O Makedoniji i Makedoncima, Št. Koste Taušanovića, Beograd, 1888.
- Tajna konvencija između Srbije i Austrougarske, Št. D. Obradović, Beograd 1909.
- Odlomci iz ustavne I narodne borbe u Srbiji, vol. I-II, Št. D. Obradović, Beograd, 1911–1912.
- Albanski problem i Srbija i Austrougarska, G. Kon, Beograd, 1913
- Srbi i Bugari u Balkanskom ratu, napisao Balkanicus, Geca Kon, Beograd 1913
- Das albanische Problem und die Beziehungen zwischen Serbien und Österreich-Ungarn, von Balkanicus (ins Deutsche übertragen von L. Markowitsch), O. Wigand, Leipzig, 1913.
- Le problème albanais, la Serbie et l'Autriche-Hongrie, par Balkanicus, Augustin Challamel, Paris, 1913.
- La Bulgarie : ses ambitions, sa trahison : accompagné des textes de tous les traité secrets et correspondances diplomatiques, par Balcanicus, Armand Colin, Paris, 1915.
- Balkanicus, The Aspirations of Bulgaria, Simkin, Marshall, Hamilton, Kent & Co. LTD, London 1915.

== Sources ==
- Dragutin D. Nikolić (1993). Stojan Protić ili Onaj koji je imao pravo. Nova Iskra.
- Olga Popović (1988). Stojan Protić i ustavno rešenje nacionalnog pitanja u Kraljevini SHS. Savremena administracija.

Government offices
Preceded by Velimir Todorović	Minister of Internal Affairs of Serbia; 1903–1905	Succeeded by Ljubomir Stojanović
Preceded by Ivan Pavićević	Minister of Internal Affairs of Serbia; 1906–1907	Succeeded by Nastas Petrović
Preceded by Mihailo M. Popović	Minister of Finance of Serbia; 1909–1912	Succeeded by Milovan Milovanović
Preceded by Ljubomir Jovanović	Minister of Internal Affairs of Serbia; 1910–1911	Succeeded by Marko Trifković
Preceded by Marko Trifković	Minister of Internal Affairs of Serbia; 1912–1914	Succeeded by Ljubomir Jovanović
Preceded by Momčilo A. Ninčić	Minister of Finance of Serbia; 1917–1918	Succeeded by Himself
Preceded by post created	Foreign Affairs Minister of the Kingdom of Serbs, Croats and Slovenes; 1918	Succeeded by Ante Trumbić
Preceded by Nikola Pašić	Prime Minister of the Kingdom of Serbs, Croats and Slovenes; 1918–1919	Succeeded by Ljubomir Davidović
Preceded by Ljubomir Davidović	Prime Minister of the Kingdom of Serbs, Croats and Slovenes; 1920	Succeeded by Milenko Vesnić
Cultural offices
Preceded by Dragiša Stanojević	Director of National Library of Serbia; 1900–1903	Succeeded by Ljubomir Jovanović
