= Léon Léauthier =

French anarchist (1874–1894)

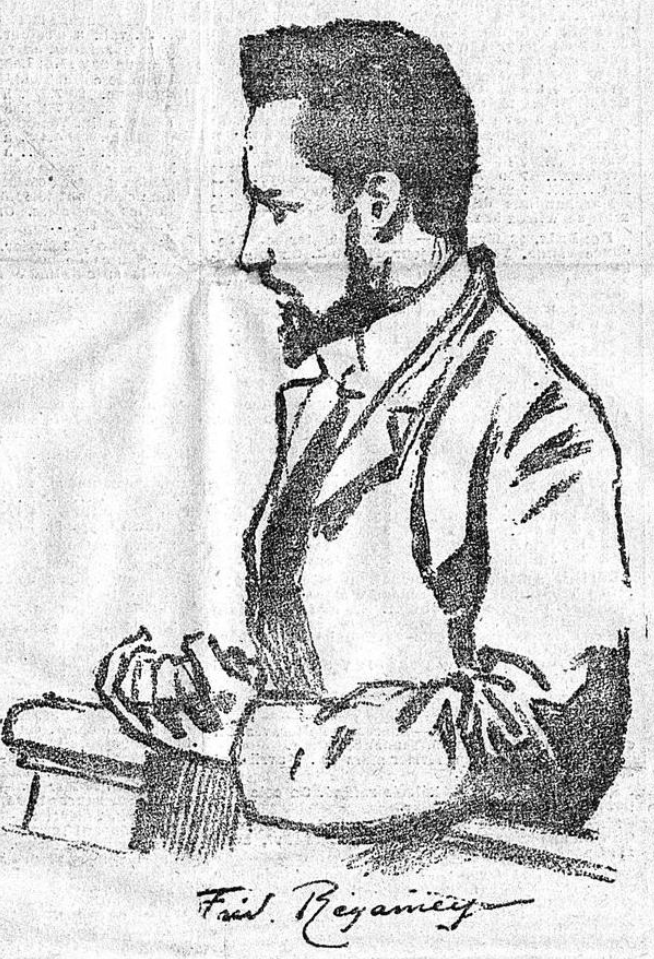
- Léon Léauthier in Le Matin (24 February 1894)
- Born: Léon-Jules Léauthier; January 5, 1874; Manosque, France
- Died: October 21, 1894 (aged 20); Salvation Islands, French Guiana

Léon-Jules Léauthier (January 1874, in Manosque - assassinated on 22 October 1894 at the penal colony of the Salvation Islands), was shoemaker, activist, and anarchist terrorist in France. An anarchist from a young age, he is best known for stabbing the Serbian diplomat Rista Georgevitch in the midst of the Ère des attentats (1892–1894), on 13 November 1893. This attack was not targeted; Léauthier chose him as a symbol of revenge against the entire bourgeoisie, which he identified in him. Taking place only six days after the Liceu bombing, Léauthier's action became one of the first acts of indiscriminate terrorism in history, making him one of the founders of modern terrorism.

Léauthier then voluntarily surrendered to the police before being sentenced to life imprisonment in the penal colony. Deported to the Salvation Islands, he was killed by police forces as part of a plot orchestrated by the authorities, resulting in the massacre of the anarchists in the penal colony.

== Biography ==
=== Birth and youth ===
Léon Jules Léauthier was born in Manosque on 5 January 1874. His mother, Marie-Julie Reyne, was 29 years old at the time of his birth and had no profession, while his father, Joseph Pierre Léauthier, was a brewery worker. His mother died when he was young, and his father remarried. His family was neither poor nor wealthy. Léon Léauthier, who had at least one sister, first studied at a Catholic school before being sent to a boarding public school in Marseille.

There, he fell in love with a young woman named Marie, who worked as a servant for the vicar general of a nearby archbishopric. He frequently visited her, introducing himself as her fiancé. He also engaged in philosophical and political discussions with the vicar, where the two debated and 'parted as good friends, but unconvinced', one defending his atheism and the other his belief in God. During this period, Léauthier also wrote poetry, which was not revolutionary in nature but rather focused on 'the Mediterranean, birds, flowers'—a romantic literary production likely intended for Marie. Despite this relationship, he eventually returned to Manosque, where he began an apprenticeship.

At the same time, he became an anarchist activist by the age of sixteen at the latest, attending all the conferences given by Sébastien Faure in Mazargues. The young man was an avid reader of several anarchist newspapers, including Le Père peinard, Le Révolté, and La Revue Anarchiste. Historian Vivien Bouhey describes him as a seasoned activist with intellectual training. During the Ère des attentats (1892–1894), as state repression against anarchists intensified, Léauthier appears to have been influenced by the ideology of Émile Henry, another anarchist militant.

=== 13 November 1893 stabbing ===
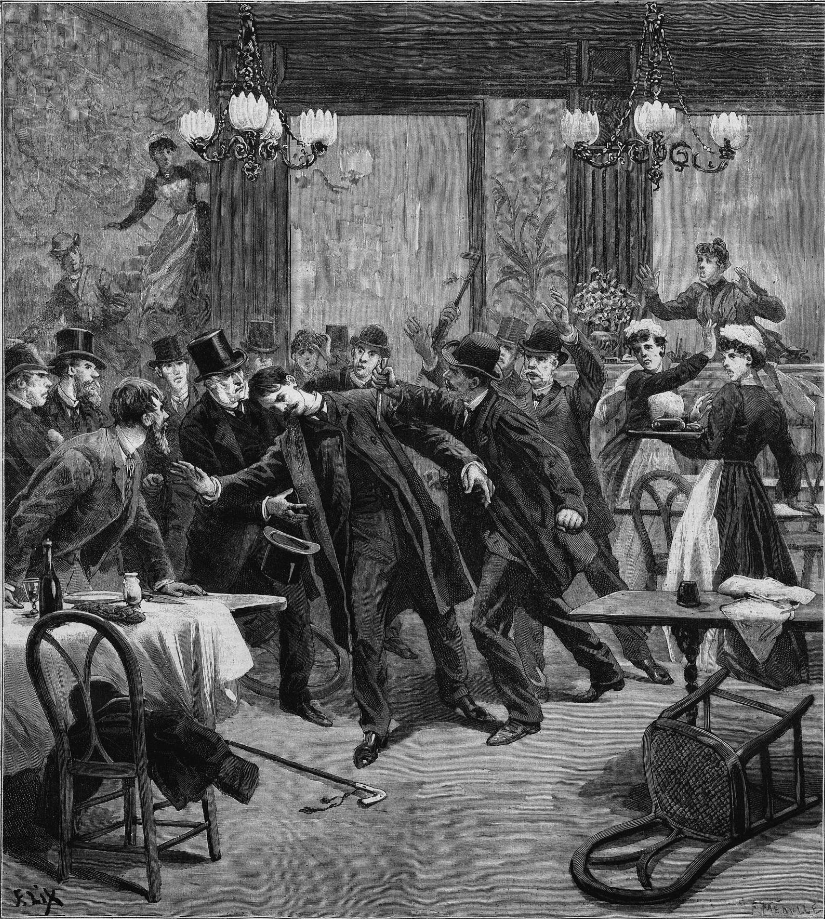
Depiction of the 13 November stabbing in Le Petit Journal (2 December 1893)

He moved from Manosque to Paris, where he managed to get a job as a shoemaker—only to be dismissed at the end of September 1893. During this period, one of his anarchist comrades, Plume, was arrested by the police. After more than a month of unemployment, during which he managed to work as a shoemaker here and there to survive, he decided to take action. Léauthier sought to meet Sébastien Faure, whose conferences he had attended since childhood, during one of his speeches in early November 1893. However, he missed him and decided to write to him on 12 November 1893. In this letter, later used during his trial, he expressed his motives and the ideology underlying the attack he was about to carry out:

I would very much like to choose, among others, a magistrate [precisely... however] I know neither their faces nor their addresses, but I will not strike an innocent by attacking the first bourgeois I come across.

The following evening, he went to dine at Bouillon Duval, located at 31 avenue de l'Opéra. There, he remained seated for about forty-five minutes after finishing his meal, staring blankly into space. Then, around 8:30 p.m., he stood up and stabbed a bourgeois in the chest as the man was leaving, knowing nothing about his identity. He drove the blade into his chest and fled, rushing into the street. The victim, a Serbian diplomat named Rista Georgevitch, pulled the dagger from his chest quickly and was astonished to have been attacked by Léauthier, whom he did not know, exclaiming:

What is this? I don’t know him! This is too much! Quick, a doctor! A doctor!

The Serbian diplomat collapsed shortly after but did not die; he ultimately survived the attack. Shortly after, Léauthier turned himself in at the police station of the 11th arrondissement of Paris. This attack holds crucial importance in the history of terrorism. Alongside the Liceu bombing, which took place a few days earlier, and the Café Terminus bombing, it was one of the first instances of indiscriminate terrorism in history. Gilles Ferragu described Léauthier's action as follows:

The first words of Rista Georgevitch, the Serbian minister in Paris, wounded on 13 November 1893 by the stabbing of an anarchist—Léauthier—express the diplomat's astonishment. Georgevitch was stabbed not for his official position but simply because he was a 'bourgeois'. [...] Léon Léauthier’s stabbing would thus be the first act of a new form of terrorism—new because it targeted the crowd, the masses, anonymously. This 13 November 1893 could mark the birth of modern terrorism in that it implicitly defines an objective enemy. Léauthier did not want to, or did not know how to, turn his act into a manifesto... A few months later, another anarchist, Émile Henry, would usher public opinion—now directly targeted—into the era of mass terrorism by declaring during his trial that he had 'struck at random'.

=== Trial ===
Léauthier’s trial took time to be set up; in fact, it took place after that of Auguste Vaillant, who had detonated a bomb in the National Assembly. The delay was due to the authorities waiting to determine whether Georgevitch would survive—if he did, Léauthier would likely avoid the death penalty.

His trial began on 24 February 1894 and lasted a single day. The prosecutor in charge of the case was Léon Bulot, who had also prosecuted the Clichy affair, an event that partially triggered the Ère des attentats and made him a target of Ravachol in the Clichy bombing. On the defense side, Léauthier was represented by Louis Lagasse, who had defended the accused in the Clichy affair and later Ravachol.

At the opening of the trial, Bulot requested the death penalty. Léauthier, for his part, took full responsibility for the act but claimed he had not intended to assassinate Georgevitch. He stated that he had deliberately struck with less force than he could have, arguing that otherwise, Georgevitch would have died. The prosecutor read the letter Léauthier had written to Sébastien Faure, arguing that it demonstrated his clear intent to kill his target.

Léauthier’s central plea, which ultimately saved his life and swayed the jury’s opinion, was his expression of his motivations, followed by a poetic and lyrical description of his misery, which had driven him to act:

Society today can be divided into two distinct classes: the exploiters and the exploited, among whom are also the indifferent. [...] Banquets, lavish feasts, grand gala entertainments, dreadful orgies—the gold of the poor, earned through immense effort, was spent, wasted, thrown away in excess by the government’s brigands. And I, during that time, in my poor attic, remained without dinner.

Léauthier also made feminist interventions, criticizing the bourgeoisie's control over women's bodies through prostitution. Although his exact statements on this subject have not been preserved, it appears that the theme of the commodification of bodies was recurrent in his arguments.

Ultimately, at the end of his trial, he was sentenced to life in a penal colony.

=== Deportation and assassination ===
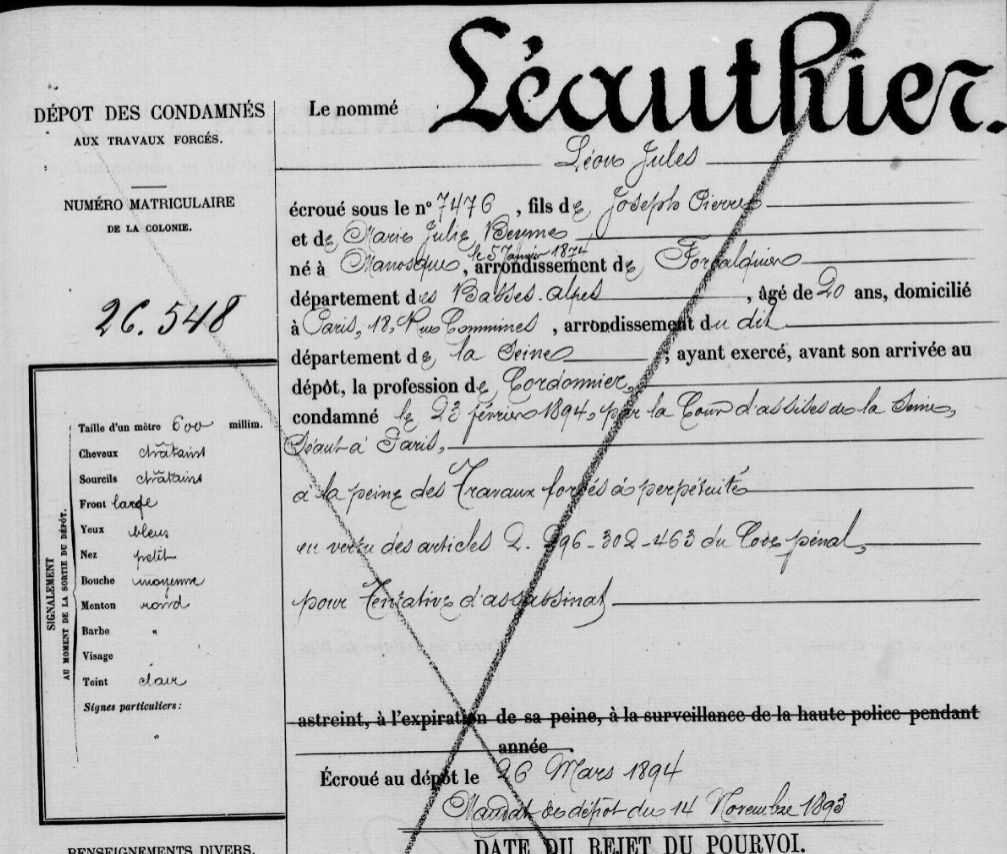
Convict record of Léon Léauthier, sentenced to deportation to the bagne (penal colony) in 1894.

Léauthier was shaved, dressed in a 'garment of infamy', and loaded onto the Ville de Saint-Nazaire along with other anarchists sentenced during this period. They were placed in cages holding fifty people and had to survive the journey under these conditions, which was especially difficult for Léauthier, who was seriously ill. At one point during the voyage, the guards killed an anarchist named Gaouyer, provoking strong protests from the anarchists in the ship’s hold. According to the official account, the anarchists then revolted and attacked the guards, leading to violence on board. However, Yves Frémion has questioned the reliability of this version, arguing that the French authorities likely fabricated it to justify the massacre of anarchists at the penal colony a few months later.

The presence of anarchists in the penal colony was deeply resented by the colonial and penitentiary administration, which believed that French judges were too lenient with them and that it was necessary to 'eradicate this rabble'. The authorities devised a plan to eliminate the imprisoned anarchists and sent a convict named Plista to infiltrate them. Not a revolutionary himself, Plista presented an escape plan that some of the anarchists initially supported. The colonial administration was aware of this plan and made preparations to suppress it, using it as a pretext to justify the anarchists’ executions.

However, the anarchists eventually realized the trap and withdrew from the escape plan before it could begin. Two guards, Mosca and Crétallaz, who had been waiting for an uprising all day with troops ready to intervene, grew impatient. They entered the first barracks they found and shot two convicts. Instead of remaining passive, about fifteen anarchists, including Léauthier and Charles Simon (Cookie), decided to resist and attacked the guards. This led to a violent clash and the outbreak of a revolt—the two guards were killed despite being the only ones armed with firearms.

The army, already prepared to intervene, stormed the colony and pursued the fugitives the next day in a large-scale manhunt. Soldiers found Léauthier and two of his companions, Maxime Lebeault and Maservin, near the rocky coast. None of the three were armed, but they seem to have understood that they would be executed on the spot. Thus, as soon as they saw the soldiers, they embraced, tore their clothes, and waited to be shot—an execution that took place moments later. Just before being killed on the shore, the three ashouted, 'Long live anarchy!', just as Simon had before his death.

== Bibliography ==
- Bouhey, Vivien (2009), Les Anarchistes contre la République [The Anarchists against the Republic], Rennes: Presses universitaires de Rennes (PUR)
- Ferragu, Gilles (2019), "L'écho des bombes : l'invention du terrorisme « à l'aveugle » (1893-1895)" [The echo of bombs: The invention of indiscriminate terrorism (1893–1895)], Ethnologie française, 49 (1): 21–31, doi:10.3917/ethn.191.0021
- Frémion, Yves (2011), Léauthier l'anarchiste. De la propagande par le fait à la révolte des bagnards (1893-1894) [Léauthier the anarchist. From propaganda by the deed to the convicts' revolt (1893-1894)], Paris: L'Échappée, ISBN 9782915830477
- Maitron, Jean; Dupuy, Rolf (June 22, 2021). "LÉAUTHIER Léon, Jules". Dictionnaire des anarchistes (in French). Paris: Maitron/Editions de l'Atelier.
