= Stilian Chilingirov =

Bulgarian writer

Stiliyan Chilingirov
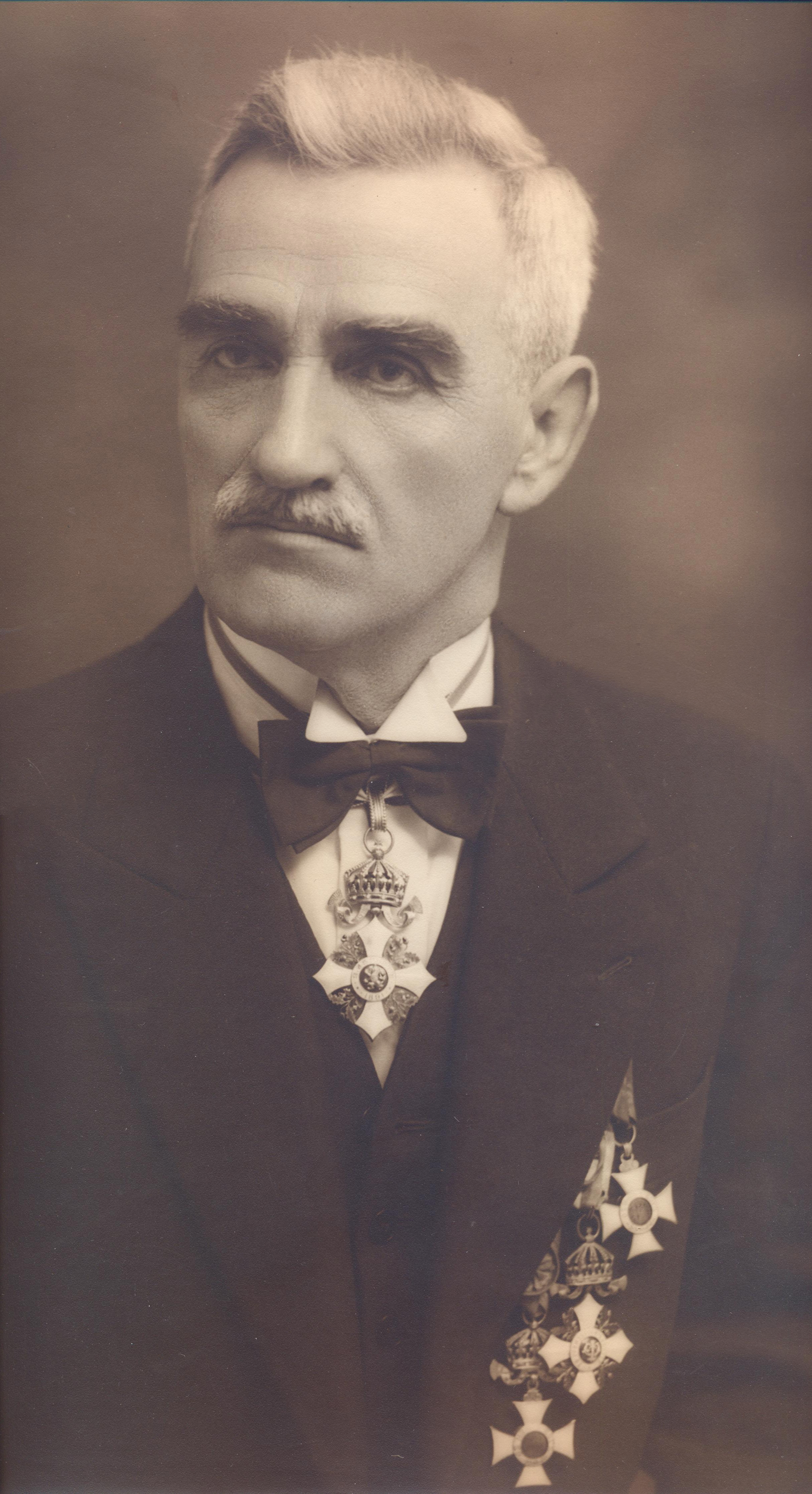
- Born: Stiliyan Hadzhidobrev Chilingirov; 26 October 1881; Shumen, Bulgaria
- Died: 23 November 1962 (aged 81); Sofia, Bulgaria
- Other names: Стилиян Хаджидобрев Чилингиров
- Occupations: Writer; ethnographer
- Known for: Bulgarian ethnographer
- Notable work: Pomoravje on Serbian Certificates (Historical Search) and Serbo-Bulgarian relations from ancient times to the present

Stiliyan Hadzhidobrev Chilingirov is a Bulgarian writer, ethnographer, prominent public figure since the beginning of the 20th century, politician. It is known as the Last Revival. He is one of the founders of the Union of Bulgarian Writers and its chairman (1941–1944).

A well-known researcher and supporter of the Bulgarian character and origin of the population of Eastern Serbia – up to Belgrade.

Holder of the Serbian Order for the preservation of the literary heritage of the National Library of Serbia during the First World War.

In the period 1919–1922 he was the Deputy Director of the SS. Cyril and Methodius National Library.
