= Milovan Milovanović =

Serbian politician, diplomat, writer and constitutional lawyer

Milovan Milovanović Милован Миловановић
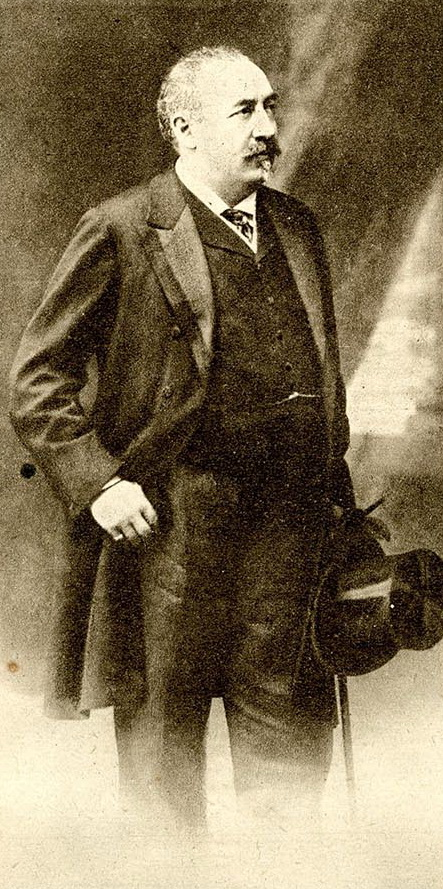

45th Prime Minister of Serbia
- In office 1911–1912
- Monarch: Peter I
- Preceded by: Nikola Pašić
- Succeeded by: Marko Trifković

Personal details
- Born: 17 February 1863 Belgrade, Principality of Serbia
- Died: 18 June 1912 (aged 49) Belgrade, Kingdom of Serbia
- Party: People's Radical Party
- Occupation: Lawyer, politician and diplomat

Milovan Đ. Milovanović also Milija Milovanović (Serbian Cyrillic: Милован Ђ. Миловановић) (17 February 1863 – 18 June 1912) was a Serbian politician, diplomat, writer and constitutional lawyer, who served as 45th Prime Minister of Serbia.

== Early life and education ==
Milovan Đ. Milovanović was born in Belgrade on 17 February 1863 as the second son of Đorđe Milovanović, a renowned judge, former Minister of Justice and member of the State Council (Državni savet). Milovanović finished high school in Belgrade and went to Paris Law School in 1881, on a state scholarship approved in 1882 by the Minister of Education Stojan Novaković. Milovanović graduated from Paris Law School in 1884 and received a doctorate from the same university in 1888, with the thesis Les Traités de garantie au XIXe siècle. His thesis was awarded the golden medal the same year.

== Scholarly career ==
In February 1888, Dr. Milovanović became a professor at the University of Belgrade's Law School, which was called the Belgrade Higher School at that time, where he taught state law and constitutionalism. Although young, he was nominated by King Milan Obrenović in 1888 as the secretary of Serbia's Constitutional Committee, and travelled to Denmark, Belgium and France to study their constitutional experience. Milovanović became the Committee's most active member and became renowned for drafting the most liberal of all of Serbia’s constitutions, that of December 1888 (January 1889, new style) which introduced modern parliamentarism, as well various other laws related to the new constitution.

Milovanović wrote numerous articles on foreign policy and the national question in various Radical dailies and journals, like Echo (Odjek) and Self-Government (Samouprava), including the influential fortnightly review Work (Delo), that he founded with other radical intellectuals in 1892. Milovanović argued for closer collaboration with Croats and Bulgarians with the slogan “Balkans to the Balkan nations“, and was an ardent supporter of a Franco-Russian alliance. His genuine idea was to achieve a rapprochement between the Balkan nations followed hopefully by an alliance (between Serbia, Montenegro, Greece, and Bulgaria), that would be linked to the Entente powers and stand firmly against the German policy of Drang nach Osten pursued by Austria-Hungary and Germany. Moderate on national standpoints, Milovanović was often accused of accepting compromises, criticized for lack of national fervour towards achieving the sacred goal of Serbian unification.

== Political career ==
Milovanović, at first closer to the Progressive Party, embraced Serbian Radicalism, which, in its moderate form of the 1890s, was quite close to French Radicalism. Milovanović left the Great School in 1891 and joined the National Radical Party. Fired by the Liberals from the Foreign Ministry in 1892, Milovanović ran for member of Parliament in 1893 and was elected. He returned to the Foreign Ministry again in 1893, only to be fired again in 1894, during the era of ”neutral ministries“, under the control of young king Aleksandar Obrenović. Milovanović served as Minister of Justice in the Radical cabinet of Đorđe Simić (17 December 1896 to 11 October 1897, old style), and worked actively in preparing the Compromise (Ugodba) with the Bulgarians (1897) concerning bilateral relations of the two nations. In 1899, for campaigning against the autocratic rule of King Aleksandar Obrenović abroad, Milovanović was sentenced, in absentia, to two years in prison.

Milovanović returned to Serbia after the King pardoned the exiled Radicals in 1900, and then served shortly as envoy to Bucharest and eventually became finance minister in the governments of Aleksa Jovanović (1900–1901) and Mihailo Vujić (1901–1902). Milovanović was instrumental to drafting the new 1901 constitution promulgated in April (Aprilski Ustav) that introduced the Upper chamber of the Serbian National Assembly, as well as laws concerning the economy. He was considered one of the creators of the Radical-Progressive coalition that made possible the formation of the Vujuć government. Milovanović left the Vujić cabinet in May 1902, after failed attempts to ensure a new foreign loan for Serbia.

In early 1903 Milovanović was appointed as Serbian envoy to Rome where he engaged in wide diplomatic activity in order to increase the role of Italy in the reform efforts of the Great Powers in Ottoman-held Old Serbia and Macedonia. He stayed in Rome until 1907. In 1907 he represented Serbia at the second Hague Peace Conference. He was appointed minister of foreign affairs in the government of Petar Velimirović (7 July 1908 to 11 February 1909, old style). Until his sudden death in June 1912, Milovanović remained in charge of the foreign ministry of Serbia, including the period in 1912 when he was the prime minister.

As foreign minister in the 1909 all-party government of Stojan Novaković (11 February 1909 to 11 October 1909, old style), Milovanović played an important role in the Annexation Crisis provoked by the annexation of Bosnia & Herzegovina by Austria-Hungary proclaimed in October 1908. In contrast to public opinion in Serbia, which resulted in organized public protests against Austria-Hungary demanding a war for the liberation of Bosnia, and party leader Nikola Pašić, who was in favour of strong political resistance to the annexation, Milovanović proposed instead territorial compensation to Serbia in the Sanjak of Novi Bazar – an idea that was not accepted by the Great Powers. In March 1909 Milovanović visited Sofia, asked for support against Vienna and offered a partition of Slavic-inhabited Macedonia, in order to end the old strife between Serbia and Bulgaria. On the other hand, the Bulgarians preferred a Slavic Macedonia intact and autonomous, as a first step to a complete annexation of the territory by Bulgaria. Milovanović remained as a foreign minister in the next cabinet led by Nikola Pašić (11 October 1909 to 25 June 1911, old style).

After becoming prime minister in 1911 (he held the office until 1912), Milovanović crafted the Serbo-Bulgarian alliance (negotiated with Bulgarian Minister Geshov and monitored by Russian diplomats), signed on 13 March 1912 a key bilateral agreement that led to the formation of the Balkan Alliance (Serbia, Bulgaria, Greece, Montenegro) against Ottoman Turkey. The provisions of the Serbo-Bulgarian alliance called for a joint action against any power (i.e. Austria-Hungary) that might try to “annex, occupy, or event temporarily to invade with its arms” the Ottoman-held Balkan provinces. A secret annex to the treaty of the alliance considered the contested and non-contested zones in Slavic Macedonia, with the contested zone of northwestern Macedonia (the region between the Šar Mountain and Lake Ohrid) left up to the arbitration of the Russian Emperor, and the uncontested southeastern zone (east of the Lake Ohrid–Kriva Palanka line) intended to become part of Bulgaria, free of any Serbian claims.

Milovanović died on 18 June 1912, just several months before the First Balkan War against the Ottomans that started in October 1912 and led to the liberation of the Balkan nations from Ottoman domination.

He was awarded the Russian Order of the White Eagle with brilliants.

== Selected works ==
- Les Traités de garantie au XIXe siècle, Paris 1888.
- Naša ustavna reforma (Our Constitutional Reform), Begrad 1888.
- Srbi i Hrvati (Serbs and Croats), Beograd 1895.
- Srbi i Bugari (Serbs and Bulgarians), Beograd 1898.
- Jedan ili dva doma (One or Two Chambers), Beograd 1901.
- Državno pravo (State Law), Filip Višnjić, Beograd 1997, 310 p.

Government offices
Preceded by Mihailo M. Popović	Minister of Finance of Serbia; 1902	Succeeded by Mihailo M. Popović
Preceded by Nikola Pašić	Minister of Foreign Affairs; 1908–1912	Succeeded by Jovan Jovanović Pižon
Preceded by Nikola Pašić	Prime Minister of Serbia; 1911–1912	Succeeded by Marko Trifković
Preceded by Stojan Protić	Minister of Finance of Serbia; 1912	Succeeded by Mihailo V. Ilić
Preceded by Aron Ninčić	Minister of Justice of Serbia; 1896–1897	Succeeded by Kosta Hristić
Preceded by Marko Trifković	Minister of Justice of Serbia; 1908	Succeeded by Kosta Timotijević
