= Marko Trifković =

Serbian politician (1864–1928)

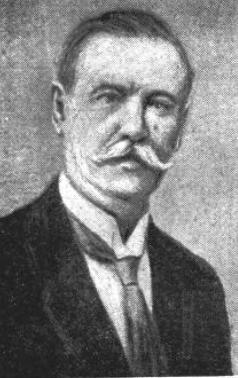
- Born: 6 September 1864; Belgrade, Principality of Serbia
- Died: 26 July 1928 (aged 63); Belgrade, Kingdom of Yugoslavia
- Occupations: politician, lawyer

Marko Trifković (Serbian Cyrillic: Марко Трифковић; Belgrade, 6 September 1864 – Belgrade, 26 July 1928) was a Serbian politician who held the post of Prime Minister of Serbia.

Government offices
Preceded by Milenko Vesnić	Minister of Justice; 1907–1908	Succeeded by Milovan Milovanović
Preceded by Dragoljub Aranđelović	Minister of Justice; 1912	Succeeded by Marko Đuričić
Preceded by Milovan Milovanović	Prime Minister of Serbia; 1912	Succeeded by Nikola Pašić
Preceded by Milovan Milovanović	Minister of Foreign Affairs; 1912	Succeeded by Jovan Jovanović Pižon
