= Anti-Croat sentiment =

Discrimination or prejudice against Croats

Anti-Croat sentiment or Croatophobia (Croatian: Hrvatofobija) is discrimination or prejudice against Croats as an ethnic group, also consisting of negative feelings towards Croatia as a country. It refers to negative attitudes towards Croats and it has been historically a basis for the persecution and ethnic cleansing of ethnic Croats.

The most widely-known historical proponents of anti-Croat sentiment in the 19th- and 20th-century were the Hungarian Liberal party, Italian Fascist Party, Serbian nationalist Chetniks and Serbian Radical Party.

== Serbian and Italian nationalism in the 19th century ==
Some of the earliest tensions between the Croatian and Serbian people were documented in the mid-19th century, during the nation-building process. Serbian Prime Minister Ilija Garašanin's Načertanije (1844), initially a secret document, claimed lands that were inhabited by Bulgarians, Macedonians, Albanians, Montenegrins, Bosniaks, Hungarians, and Croats as a part of Serbia. Garašanin's plan also included methods of spreading Serbian influence in the claimed lands. He proposed ways to influence Croats, who Garašanin regarded as "Serbs of Catholic faith." In 1901, Serbian Orthodox bishop Nikodim Milaš published the influential work Pravoslavna Dalmacija, in which he, among others, claimed that the Croatian historical lands and historical-sacral heritage were Serbian since the Early Middle Ages.

Vuk Karadžić and other early Slavists considered everyone speaking Shtokavian dialects to be ethnic Serbs. Hence, the literary and standard Croatian language and heritage, based on Shtokavian, was to be a part of the Serbian language, and all Shtokavian-speaking Croats were counted as "Catholic Serbs." Chakavian was considered by them to be the only original Croatian language, sometimes also Kajkavian which was theoretically related to the Slovenes, and sometimes none dialect (grouping Chakavian with Shtokavian as the Serbian language), reducing Croats to merely a toponym. Croatia was at the time a kingdom in the Habsburg monarchy, with Dalmatia and Istria being separate Habsburg crown lands.

After Austria-Hungary occupied Bosnia and Herzegovina in 1878 and Serbia gained its independence from the Ottoman Empire, Croatian and Serbian relations deteriorated as both sides had pretensions on Bosnia and Herzegovina. In 1902, there was a reprinted article written by the Serb Nikola Stojanović that was published in the publication of the Serb Independent Party from Zagreb titled Do istrage vaše ili naše (Till the Destruction, Ours or Yours). The article denied the existence of a Croat nation, and forecast the result of the "inevitable" Serbian-Croatian conflict.

That combat has to be led till the destruction, either ours or yours. One side must succumb. That side will be Croatians, due to their minority, geographical position, mingling with Serbs and because the process of evolution means Serbdom is equal to progress.

— Nikola Stojanović, Srbobran, 10 August 1902

During the 19th century, some Italian radical nationalists tried to promote the idea that the Croatian nation has no sound reason to exist: therefore the Slavic population on the east coast of the Adriatic Sea (Croats and Slovenes) should be Italianized, and the territory be included in Italy.

== First Yugoslavia (1918–1941) ==
A new state was established in late 1918. The Kingdom underwent a crucial change in 1921 to the dismay of Croatia's largest political party, the Croatian Peasant Party (Hrvatska seljačka stranka). The new constitution abolished historical/political entities, including Croatia and Slavonia, centralizing authority in the capital of Belgrade. Nikola Pašić believed that Yugoslavia should be as centralized as possible, creating a Greater Serbian national concept of concentrated power in the hands of Belgrade in place of distinct regional governments and identities.

During a Parliament session in 1928, Puniša Račić, a deputy of the Serbian Radical People's Party, shot at Croatian deputies, resulting in the killing of Pavle Radić and Đuro Basariček and the wounding of Ivan Pernar and Ivan Granđa. Stjepan Radić, a Croatian political champion at the time, was wounded and later succumbed to his wounds. These multiple murders caused the outrage of the Croatian population and ignited violent demonstrations, strikes, and armed conflicts throughout Croatian parts of the country.

In response to the shooting at the National Assembly, King Alexander abolished the parliamentary system and proclaimed a royal dictatorship. He imposed a new constitution aimed at removing all existing national identities and imposing "integral Yugoslavism". He also renamed the country from the Kingdom of Serbs, Croats and Slovenes to the Kingdom of Yugoslavia. Political parties were banned and the royal dictatorship took on an increasingly harsh character. In 1931, the royal regime organized the assassination of Croatian scientist and intellectual Milan Šufflay on the streets of Zagreb. The assassination was condemned by globally renowned intellectuals such as Albert Einstein and Heinrich Mann.

== World War II (1941–1945) ==
=== Fascist Italy ===
Fascist-led Italianization, or the forced assimilation of Italian culture on the ethnic Croat communities inhabiting the former Austro-Hungarian territories of the Julian March and areas of Dalmatia, as well as ethnically mixed cities in Italy proper, such as Trieste, had already been initiated prior to World War II. The anti-Slavic sentiment, perpetuated by Italian fascism, led to the persecution of Croats, alongside ethnic Slovenes, on ethnic and cultural grounds.

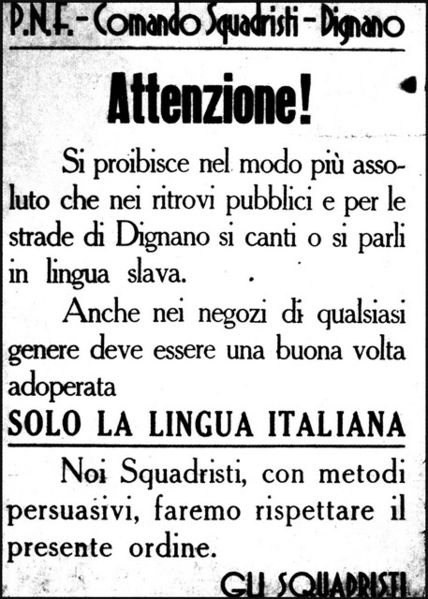
A leaflet from the period of fascist Italianization prohibiting singing or speaking in the "Slavic language" in the streets and public places of Dignano (now Vodnjan, Croatia). Signed by the Squadristi (blackshirts), and threatening the use of "persuasive methods" in enforcement.

In September 1920, Mussolini said:

When dealing with such a race as Slavic – inferior and barbaric – we must not pursue the carrot, but the stick policy. We should not be afraid of new victims. The Italian border should run across the Brenner Pass, Monte Nevoso, and the Dinaric Alps. I would say we can easily sacrifice 500,000 barbaric Slavs for 50,000 Italians.

— Benito Mussolini, speech held in Pula, 20 September 1920

This period of fascist Italianization included the banning of the Croatian language in administration and courts between 1923 and 1925, the Italianization of Croat first and last names in 1926, and the dissolution of Croatian societies, financial co-operatives and banks. Hundreds of Croatian-speaking schools were closed by the state.

On 13 July 1920, Italian fascists attacked the Croatian National House in Pula, destroying property belonging to various Croatian societies and burning around 7,000 books written in the Croatian language. The incident was one of the first fascist book burnings in Europe.

Between February and April 1921, Croats in Istria became victims of Italian fascist terror during the period of fascist and anti-fascist violence in Italy. In response to the Proština rebellion, led by Croat Anti-fascists and local peasants, hundreds of Italian Squadrismo militia, Black Shirts, as well as members of the local army and police, attacked the Croat villages of Proština, Krnica, Marčana and Šegotići, in order to intimidate the Croat population. The fascists burned Šegotići completely to the ground, while houses in the other villages were also burned. 400 peasants were arrested and imprisoned in Pula, several peasants died after being beaten to death.

This period was therefore characterised as "centralising, oppressive and dedicated to the forcible Italianisation of the minorities" consequently leading to a strong emigration and assimilations of Slovenes and Croats from the Julian March.

Following the Axis invasion of Yugoslavia in April 1941, Italy occupied almost all of Dalmatia, as well as Gorski Kotar and the Italian government made stringent efforts to further Italianize the region. Italian occupying forces were accused of committing war crimes in order to transform occupied territories into ethnic Italian territories. An example of this was the 1942 massacre in Podhum, when Italian forces murdered up to 118 Croat civilians and deported the remaining population to concentration camps.

The Italian government operated concentration camps for tens of thousands Slavic citizens, such as Rab concentration camp and one on the island of Molat, where thousands died, including hundreds of children.

According to statistics collected through 1946 by the Commission for War Damages on the Territory of the People’s Republic of Croatia, Italian authorities with their collaborators killed 30,795 civilians (not including those killed in concentration camps and prisons) in Dalmatia, Istria, Gorski Kotar and the Croatian Littoral.

=== Nazi Germany ===
Nazi German racial theories towards the Croats were inconsistent and contradictory. On the one hand, the Nazis described the Croats officially as being "more Germanic than Slav", a notion propagated by Croatia's fascist dictator Ante Pavelić who imposed the view that the "Croatians were the descendants of the ancient Goths" who "had the Panslav idea forced upon them as something artificial".

However, the Nazi regime continued to classify Slavs as Untermensch, despite inclusion of Slavs such as Russians, Ukrainians, Czechs, Serbs, Bosnians and Croats in SS divisions.

Furthermore, according to the book "Hitler's Table Talk", a collection of monologues by Adolf Hitler and conversations he had with close associates in the period from 1941 to 1944, Hitler mentioned that "Croats are desirable, from the ethnical point of view, and should be germanized. But there, however, were political reasons which completely preclude any such measures".

After the Anschluss of 1938, Austrian Burgenland Croats faced Germanization and were forced by the Nazi regime to assimilate. Minority rights that had been approved in 1937, such as Croatian language schools and bilingualism, were abolished under Nazi rule.

Between 1941 and 1945, some 200,000 Croatian citizens of the NDH (including ethnic Croats as well as ethnic Serbs with Croatian nationality and Slovenes) were sent to Germany to work as a slave and forced labourers, mostly working in mining, agriculture and forestry. It is estimated that 153,000 of these labourers were said to have been "voluntarily" recruited, however in many instances this was not the case, as the workers that may have initially volunteered were forced to work longer hours and were paid less than their contracts had stipulated, they were also not allowed to return home after their yearly contract had ended, at which point their labour was no longer voluntary, but forced. Forced and slave labour were also conducted in Nazi concentration camps, such as in Buchenwald and Mittelbau-Dora.

From 1941 to 1945, 3.8% of the population of Croatia had been sent to the Reich to work, which was higher than the European average.

As in other parts of Yugoslavia, Nazi German forces committed several war crimes against Croat civilians in reprisal for the actions of the Yugoslav Partisans. Examples of such policies include the Massacre of villages under Kamešnica and the massacre in the village of Lipa, while others were deported to and killed in German concentration camps. At least 7,000 Croat civilians from the territory of the Independent State of Croatia were killed by Nazi German forces, in acts of terror or in concentration camps.

=== Serbian Chetniks ===
Regarding the realization of his Greater Serbian program Homogeneous Serbia, Stevan Moljević wrote in his letter to Dragiša Vasić in February 1942:

(...) 2) Regarding our internal affairs, the demarcation with the Croats, we hold that we should as soon as an opportunity occurs, gather all the strength and create a completed act: occupy territories marked on the map, clean it before anyone pulls itself together. We would assume that the occupation would only be carried out if the main hubs were strong in Osijek, Vinkovci, Slavonski Brod, Sunja, Karlovac, Knin, Šibenik, Mostar and Metković, and then from within starts with an [ethnic] cleansing of all non-Serb elements. The guilty should have an open way – Croats to Croatia, Muslims to Turkey (or Albania). As for the Muslims, our government in London should immediately address the issue with Turkey. The English will also help us. (Question is!). The organization for the interior cleansing should be prepared immediately, and it could be because there are many refugees in Serbia from all "Serb lands" (...).

The tactics employed against the Croats were at least to an extent, a reaction to the terror carried out by the Ustashas, but Croats and Muslims living in areas intended to be part of Greater Serbia were to be cleansed of non-Serbs regardless, in accordance with Draža Mihailović's directive of 20 December 1941. However the largest Chetnik massacres took place in eastern Bosnia where they preceded any significant Ustasha operations. Chetnik ethnic cleansing targeted Croat civilians throughout areas of Croatia and Bosnia and Herzegovina, in which Croats were massacred and expelled, such as the Krnjeuša, Gata, Makarska and Kulen Vakuf massacres, among many others. According to the Croatian historian, Vladimir Žerjavić, Chetnik forces killed between 18,000 and 32,000 Croats during World War II, mostly civilians. Some historians regard Chetnik actions during this period as constituting genocide.

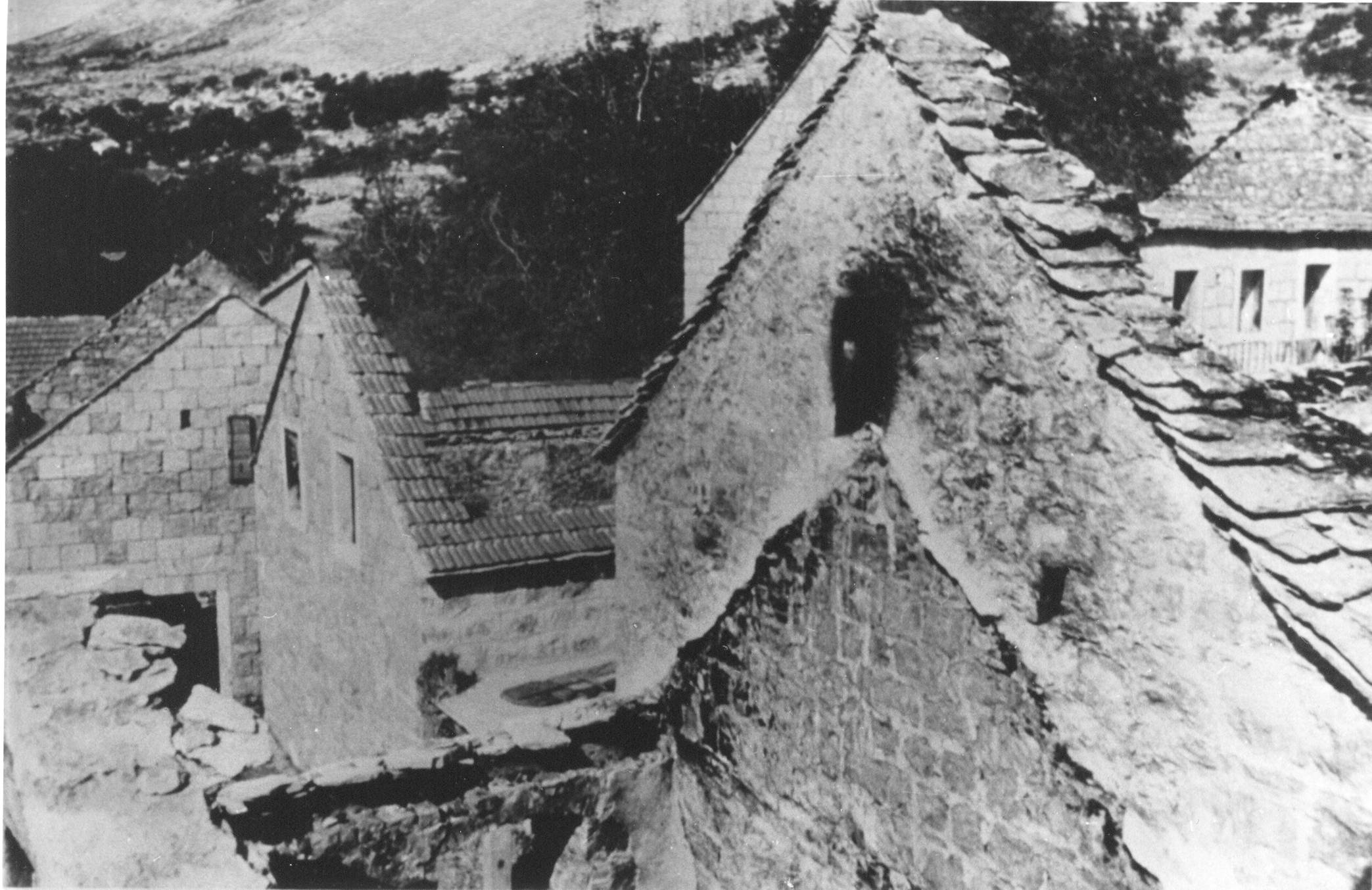
Destruction of the Croat village of Gata

Written evidence by Chetnik commanders indicates that terrorism against the non-Serb population was mainly intended to establish an ethnically pure Greater Serbia in the historical territory of other ethnic groups (most notably Croatian and Muslim, but also Bulgarian, Romanian, Hungarian, Macedonian and Montenegrin). In Elaborate of the Chetnik's Dinaric Battalion from March 1942, it's stated that the Chetniks' main goal was to create a "Serbian national state in the areas in which the Serbs live, and even those to which Serbs aspire (Bosnia and Herzegovina, Lika and part of Dalmatia) where "only Orthodox population would live". It is also stated that Bosniaks should be convinced that Serbs are their allies, so they wouldn't join the Partisans, and then kill them."

Regarding the campaign, Chetnik commander Milan Šantić said in Trebinje in July 1942, "The Serb lands must be cleansed from Catholics and Muslims. They will be inhabited only by the Serbs. Cleansing will be carried out thoroughly, and we will suppress and destroy them all without exception and without pity, which will be the starting point for our liberation. Mihailović went further than Moljević and requested over 90 percent of the NDH's territory, where more than 2,500,000 Catholics and over 800,000 Muslims lived (70 percent of the total population, with Orthodox Serbs the remaining 30 percent).

According to Bajo Stanišić, the final goal of the Chetniks was the "founding of a new Serbian state, not a geographical term but a purely Serbian, with four basic attributes: the Serbian state [Greater Serbia], the Serb King [of] the Karađorđević dynasty, Serbian nationality, and Serbian faith. The Balkan federation is also the next stage, but the main axis and leadership of this federation must be our Serbian state, that is, the Greater Serbia.

== Second Yugoslavia (1945–1991) ==
In 1891, Croatian archeologist Lujo Marun found a sarcophagus of a 9th century Croatian duke in a village Biskupija near Knin. These remains were later identified to most likely belong to Branimir of Croatia. On the next day, a group of people reportedly re-opened the grave and vandalized the remains. In 1983, someone vandalized a 9th century Croatian pre-Romanesque Church of Holy Salvation in Cetina by destroying Croatian interlace ornaments on it, in order to remove the proof of its old-Croatian origin.

After Serbian President Slobodan Milošević's assumption of power in 1989, various Chetnik groups made a "comeback" and his regime "made a decisive contribution to launching the Chetnik insurrection in 1990–1992 and to funding it thereafter," according to the political scientist Sabrina P. Ramet. Chetnik ideology was influenced by the memorandum of the Serbian Academy of Sciences and Arts. Serbs in north Dalmatia, Knin, Obrovac, and Benkovac held the first anti-Croatian government demonstrations. On 28 June 1989, the 600th anniversary of the Battle of Kosovo, exiled Croatian Serb Chetnik commander Momčilo Đujić bestowed the Serbian politician Vojislav Šešelj with the title of voivode, encouraging him to "expel all Croats, Albanians, and other foreign elements from holy Serbian soil", stating he would return to the Balkans only when Serbia was cleansed of "the last Jew, Albanian, and Croat". Šešelj is a major proponent of a Greater Serbia with no ethnic minorities, but "ethnic unity and harmony among Orthodox Serbs, Catholic Serbs, Muslim Serbs and atheist Serbs". In late 1991, during the Battle of Vukovar, Šešelj went to Borovo Selo to meet with a Serbian Orthodox bishop and publicly described Croats as a genocidal and perverted people. In May and July 1992, Šešelj visited the Vojvodinian village of Hrtkovci and publicly started the campaign of persecution of local ethnic Croats.

== Persecution of Croats in Serbia during the Yugoslav wars ==
During the Yugoslav Wars, members of the Serbian Radical Party conducted a campaign of intimidation and persecution against the Croats of Serbia through hate speech. These acts forced a part of the local Croat population to leave the area in 1992. Most of them were resettled in Croatia. The affected locations included Hrtkovci, Nikinci, Novi Slankamen, Ruma, Šid, and other places bordering Croatia. According to some estimates, around 10,000 Croats left Vojvodina under political pressure in three months of 1992, and a total of 20,000 fled by the end of the year. Between 20,000 and 25,000 to 30,000 according to Human Rights NGOs to 50,000 Croats fled Vojvodina in the 1990s in total. Another 6,000 left Kosovo and 5,000 Serbia Proper, including Belgrade. The Serbian Humanitarian Law Centre, based in Belgrade, has documented at least 17 instances of killings or disappearances of Croats from Vojvodina from 1991 to 1995. In many instances, entire Croat families were abducted and murdered.

== Croatian War of Independence (1991–1995) ==
16,000 Croats were killed during the Croatian War of Independence, 43.4% of whom were civilians, largely through massacres and bombings that occurred during the war. The total number of expelled Croats and other non-Serbs during the Croatian War of Independence ranges from 170,000 (ICTY), 250,000 (Human Rights Watch) or 500,000 (UNHCR). Croatian Serbs forces together with Yugoslav People's Army and Serbian nationalist paramilitaries committed numerous war crimes against Croat civilians. There were numerous well-documented war crimes against civilians and prisoners of war perpetrated by Serb and Yugoslav forces in Croatia, including the Dalj killings, the Lovas massacre, the Široka Kula massacre, the Baćin massacre, the Saborsko massacre, the Škabrnja massacre, the Voćin massacre, and the Zagreb rocket attacks.

According to the Croatian Association of Prisoners in Serbian Concentration Camps, a total of 8,000 Croatian civilians and prisoners of war (a large number after the fall of Vukovar) went through Serb prison camps such as Velepromet camp, Sremska Mitrovica camp, Stajićevo camp, Begejci camp and many others where many were heavily abused and tortured. A total of 300 people never returned from them. A total of 4,570 camp inmates started legal action against former Serbia and Montenegro (now Serbia) for torture and abuse in the camps. Croatia regained control over most of the territories occupied by the Croatian Serb rebels in 1995.

The borders of Greater Serbia as advocated by Serbian Radical politician Vojislav Šešelj, defined by the Virovitica–Karlovac–Karlobag hypothetical boundary to the west.

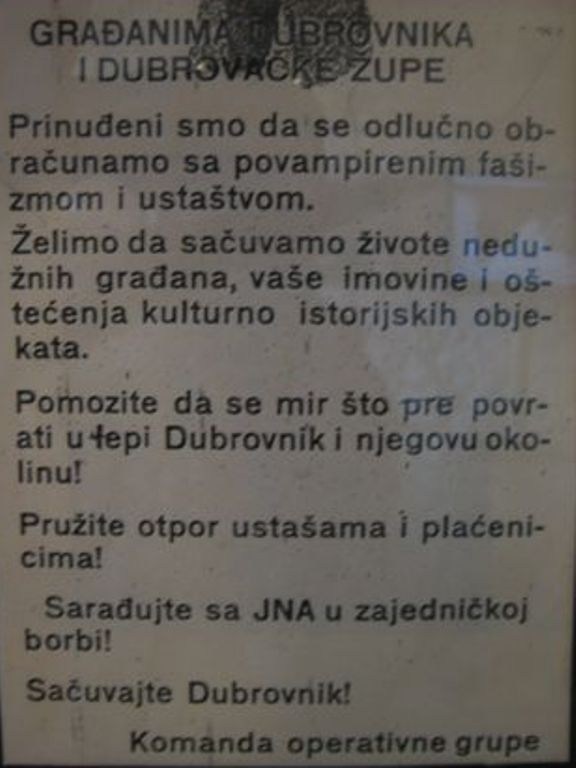
A flyer calling upon citizens of Dubrovnik, during the 1991–1992 siege, to cooperate with the JNA against the Croats' "vampired fascism and Ustašism"

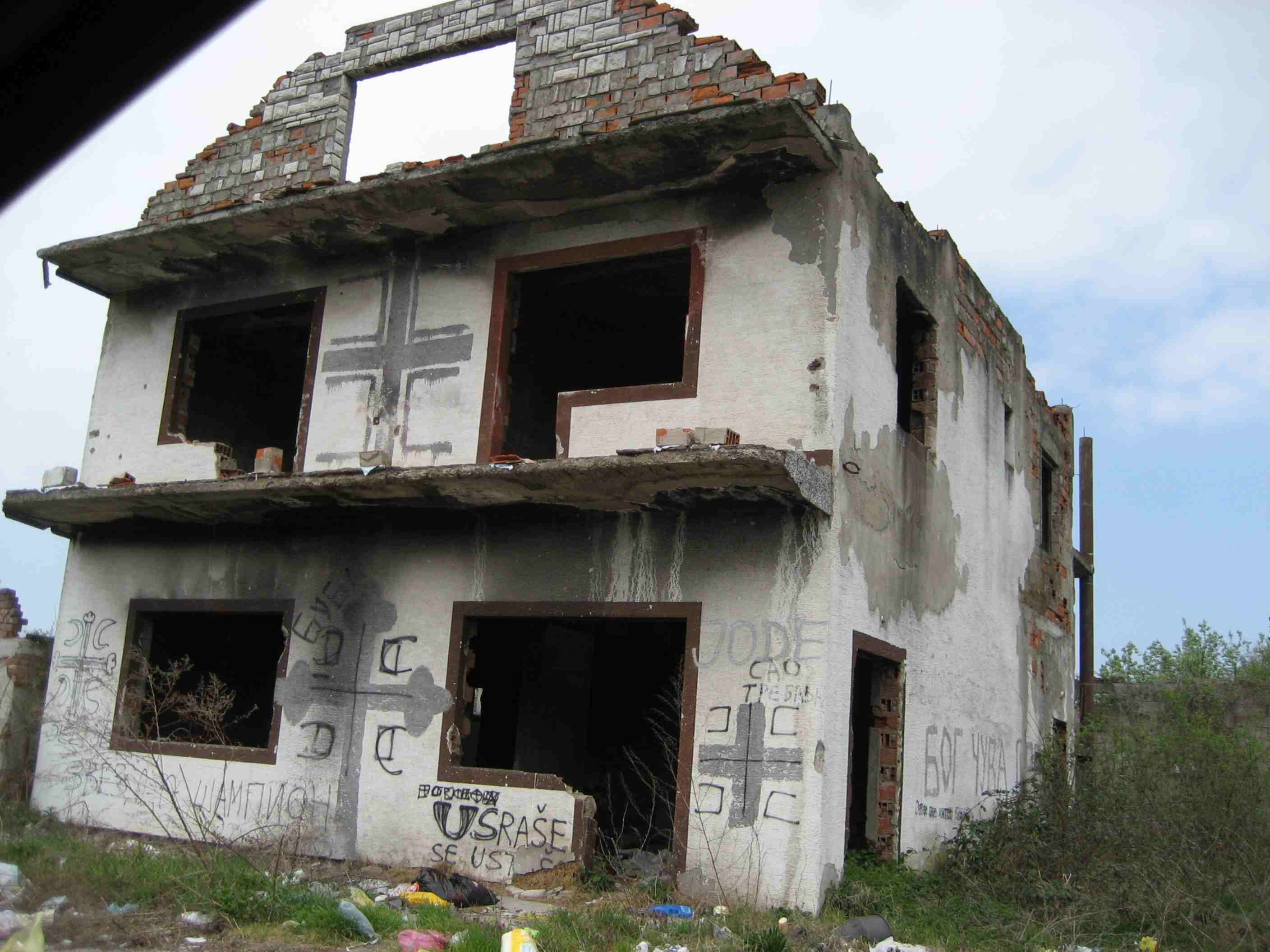
Bosnian Croat house defaced with graffiti: Serbian cross, "Red Star champion", "Usraše se Ustaše" (Ustashas shat their pants) and "God protects Serbs"

== Bosnian War (1992–1995) ==
War crimes and acts of ethnic cleansing were also committed by the Bosnian Serb and Muslim (Bosniak) armies against Bosnian Croat civilians, during the Bosnian War, from 1992 to 1995. Concentration camps (such as Omarska, Manjača and Trnopolje) were established by the Yugoslav People's Army (JNA) and the authorities of Republika Srpska (RS), where thousands of Bosnian Muslims and Croat civilians were detained, tortured, and killed. 490,000 Bosnian Croats (or 67% of the population) became displaced during the conflict. The acts have been found to have satisfied the requirements for "guilty acts" of genocide and that "some physical perpetrators held the intent to physically destroy the protected groups of Bosnian Muslims and Croats". In the Serb-controlled Republika Srpska entity, the population of Croats in 2011, has decreased from 151,000 to 15,000 since 1991, mostly as a result of war. Some of the war crimes perpetrated by Serb forces included: the Doboj, Bosanski Šamac, Prijedor ethnic cleansings and the Brčko bridge massacre.

During the Croat-Bosniak conflict Bosniak media began referring to the Croats as "Ustaše". The Sarajevo government had a propaganda campaign to label their rivals as war criminals and themselves as the innocent victims. Bosniak press tried to deny Bosniak war crimes, and when that was no longer possible, it described them as a "retaliation by the victims". There are no precise statistics dealing with the casualties of the Croat-Bosniak conflict along ethnic lines. Former commander of the ARBiH 3rd Corps, Enver Hadžihasanović, along with former commander of the 7th Muslim Brigade, Amir Kubura, were convicted for failing to take necessary and reasonable measures to prevent or punish several crimes committed by forces under their command in central Bosnia. Some of the massacres perpetrated by Bosniak forces were Vitez, Trusina, Grabovica and Uzdol massacre. Bosniak forces also operated a number of detention camps for Croat and Serb civilians and POWs, where a number of prisoners were abused and killed, such as in the Silos and Musala camps. ARBiH expelled slightly over 150,000 Croats, while the HVO expelled around 50,000 Bosniaks.

Terrorism in Bosnia and Herzegovina following the Dayton Agreement mostly consisted of murders and bombings of specific people, primarily Croats. The mujahideen that stayed in the country created a climate of fear in central Bosnia, where they conducted regular shootings at and bombings of Croat houses and carried frequent attacks on Croat returnees.

== 21st century ==
=== Serbia ===
Croats were recognised in Serbia as a minority group just after 2002. According to some estimates, the number of Croats who left Serbia under political pressure from the Milošević government may have been between 20,000 and 40,000. According to Tomislav Žigmanov, Croats live in fear as they have become the most hated minority group in Serbia. The Government of Croatia contends that anti-Croat sentiment is still prevalent in Serbia. There were several cases of desecration of Catholic cemeteries, attacks on Roman Catholic churches. The monument to Matija Gubec was demolished twice. There were various graffiti of the worst content: "Death to the Croats!" and "Croats get out from Serbia!".

In contemporary Serbia, both politicians and media outlets have used the slur "Ustaše" to negatively refer to Croatians and Croatia as being a fascist nation. During a 2017 interview with Dragan J. Vučićević, editor-in-chief of Serbian Progressive Party's propaganda flagship Informer, Vučićević held the belief that the "vast majority of Croatian nation are Ustaše" and thus ''fascists''. The same notion is sometimes drawn through his tabloid's writings.

A 2019 survey conducted by the Serbian newspaper Blic found that Croatians are the most hated foreign group in Serbia, with 45 percent of respondents surveyed having negative views of Croatian people. Tomislav Žigmanov, a prominent member of the Croatian community in Serbia, stated that “...resentment and stereotypes against the Croats are widespread in Serbia...” which is a consequence of “...strong and prevailing anti-Croat contents in statements of a relatively high number of Serbian senior officials.”

In 2019, after a Serbian armed forces delegation was barred from entering Croatia without prior state notice to visit Jasenovac concentration camp Memorial Site in their official uniforms, Aleksandar Vulin, the Serbian defense minister, commented on the barred visit by saying that modern Croatia is a "follower of Ante Pavelić's fascist ideology."

In October 2021, a local Croatian-language weekly newspaper in Serbia's Vojvodina region, Hrvatska riječ, reported that a grammar book for eighth-grade pupils stated that the Serbian, Slovenian, Macedonian and Bulgarian languages are South Slavic languages while "Croats, Bosniaks and some Montenegrins call the Serbian language Croatian, Bosnian, Bosniak or Montenegrin". The textbook was approved by the Serbian Institute for the Improvement of Education, a state education institution. The wording of the Serbian textbook has been criticised by the Institute of Croatian Language and Linguistics, by Žigmanov, president of the Democratic Alliance of Croats in Vojvodina, and by Jasna Vojnić, president of the Croatian National Council in Serbia, an organisation which represents the interests of the Croat minority in the country.

In June 2022, Aleksandar Vučić was prevented from entering Croatia to visit the Jasenovac Memorial Site by Croatian authorities due to him not announcing his visit through official diplomatic channels, which is a common practice. As a response to that certain Serbian ministers labeled Andrej Plenković's government as "Ustasha government" with some tabloids calling Croatia a fascist state.

After the EU banned Serbia from importing Russian oil through Croatian Adriatic Pipeline in October 2022, Serbian news station B92 wrote that the sanctions came after: "insisting of Ustasha regime from Zagreb and its Ustasha Prime Minister Andrej Plenković". Vulin described the EU as "the club of countries which had their divisions under Stalingrad".

=== Bosnia and Herzegovina ===
Croats are the third-largest ethnic group and "constituent people" by the preamble of Constitution of Bosnia and Herzegovina. Bosniaks make up about 70 percent of Federation of Bosnia and Herzegovina's inhabitants. That gives them vast numerical superiority at the polls and de facto control over who can be elected to lead the Croats at the presidential level. Croats have unleashed new calls for sweeping electoral reforms. Bosnia's current Croat President Željko Komšić, who is effectively backed by Bosniak voters, has lambasted the idea, calling it "an electoral law based on apartheid". In October 2023 in his response to Israel’s Ambassador to Albania and Bosnia and Herzegovina, based in Tirana, Galit Peleg, Komšić broadly implied that all Croats in Mostar are fascists. Komšić is not considered a legitimate Croat representative by either Croats or Croatia.

In September 2024 Bosniak politician Džafer Alić, member of SDA said on TV interview: "We (Bosniaks) are the owners of Bosnia and Herzegovina, but we have very unpleasant tenants (Croats and Serbs) behind whom we always have to clean up, sweep away." Bosniak nationalists often generalize both of the other ethnic groups as “killers,” whose goal it is “exterminate” Bosniaks and divide the territorial spoils between themselves.

Bishop Franjo Komarica of Banja Luka claimed that Catholics are being discriminated in all respects: politically, socially, and economically. Catholics often have problems when they have Croat names.

In 2025 Bosnian Defense Minister Zukan Helez first linked Croatian MEP Željana Zovko and Max Primorac, a senior official of the Heritage Foundation, to Ustasha genes via Facebook. He then appeared on Hayat Television, where he called the two officials Ustasha bastards. He added that Zovko was semi-retarded. His scandalous statement came after Primorac was heard before the US Congress Committee on Europe. There, he said that Croatian Catholics were discriminated against by Bosniak Muslims, and proposed the establishment of a Croatian entity in BiH.

The head of the House of Representatives of the Federation of Bosnia and Herzegovina, Dragan Mioković, said on Face TV in January 2026: "Partisans killed a few Croats in Bleiburg". Representatives of the Croatian parties called on Dragan Mioković to resign, and announced the filing of criminal charges. During the day, Mioković apologized for his words.

The Minister of Foreign Affairs of Bosnia and Herzegovina, Elmedin Konaković, said in July 2026 that the Croats living in that country "have more rights than they deserve" and claimes that they won such status at the expense of the Bosniaks.

=== Italy ===
Historical conflicts have existed between Croatians and Italians over the region of Dalmatia, which is now controlled by Croatia and has been claimed as historically Italian territory. Italian president Giorgio Napolitano provoked an angry reaction from his Croatian counterpart after criticizing the actions of Croatians in Dalmatia, which he described as "Slavic expansionist" with allegations of ethnic cleansing. The reaction from the Croatian side resulted in a cancellation of state visit by the Italian president. The European Union intervened and attempted to defuse the row between the two countries.

In February 2019, Italian politician, and then President of the European Parliament, Antonio Tajani, held a speech at the National Memorial Day of the Exiles and Foibe commemoration in Basovizza (Trieste) which aroused an outrage in Slovenia and Croatia, most notably the statement "Long live Trieste, long live Italian Istria, long live Italian Dalmatia". After numerous high representatives of the two countries strongly condemned the speech for its revisionist and irredentist connotations, Tajani stated his words were intended as "a message of peace" and were misinterpreted. The Slovenian party Social Democrats launched a petition demanding Tajani's immediate resignation as president of the EU Parliament, which was signed among others by several former presidents of Slovenia and Croatia.

== Pejorative terms for Croats ==
Ustasha (Ustaše)
Became a derogatory slur used primarily by Serbian nationalists in reference to the Independent State of Croatia and the fascist Ustasha movement during World War II in Yugoslavia. In contemporary Serbia, both politicians and media outlets have used the slur "Ustaše" to negatively refer to Croatia and Croats as being a fascist nation. During a 2017 interview with Dragan J. Vučićević, editor-in-chief of Serbian Progressive Party's propaganda flagship Informer, Vučićević held the belief that the "vast majority of Croatian nation are Ustaše" and thus ''fascists''. The same notion is sometimes drawn through his tabloid's writings. In 2019, after a Serbian armed forces delegation was barred from entering Croatia without prior state notice to visit Jasenovac concentration camp Memorial Site in their official uniforms, Aleksandar Vulin, the Serbian defense minister, commented on the barred visit by saying that modern Croatia is a "follower of Ante Pavelić's fascist ideology." In June 2022, Aleksandar Vučić was prevented from entering Croatia to visit the Jasenovac Memorial Site by Croatian authorities due to him not announcing his visit through official diplomatic channels, which is a common practice. As a response to that certain Serbian ministers labeled Andrej Plenković's government as "Ustasha government" with some tabloids calling Croatia fascist. After the EU banned Serbia from importing Russian oil through Croatian Adriatic Pipeline in October 2022, Serbian news station B92 wrote that the sanctions came after: "insisting of Ustasha regime from Zagreb and its Ustasha Prime Minister Andrej Plenković". Vulin described the EU as "the club of countries which had their divisions under Stalingrad".
Rvatina / Rvat
Word for a Croat from the West Ikavian Štokavian dialect, originaly used in the area of the Dalmatian hinterland and part of Herzegovina, pointing that Croats are crooked and illiterate nationalists.
Škutor
Primarily used to refer to ethnic Croats of Bosnia and Herzegovina, as well as to majority of Croats who are not natives of the modern-day Croatia.
Hrvat je tat
Hrvat je tat (The Croat is a thief) is a Slovene derogatory slogan aimed at the Croats. According to Katarina Šrimpf Vedranin, its point is that Croats are less worthy than Slovenes.
Čefur (Slovenia)
Slovene derogatory ethnic slur for Non-Slovenian people of former Yugoslavia, including Croats. The term derives from Turkish "cühut", pejorative for a Jew.
Kaur / Đaur (Bosnia and Herzegovina)
Turkish contemptuous term for Christians also used in Bosnian language. In the Ottoman Empire, it denoted any subject who is not a Muslim.
Wog (Australia)
In Australian English, the slur "wog" is used to refer to immigrants of Southern European, Mediterranean, Middle Eastern, and sometimes Eastern European ethnicity or appearance, and has thus also been applied to ethnic Croat immigrants.

== See also ==
- Anti-Catholicism
- Anti-Slavic sentiment
