= Ante Ciliga =

Croatian politician, writer and publisher (1898–1992)

- Born: 20 February 1898; Šegotići near Marčana, Austrian Littoral, Austria-Hungary
- Died: 21 October 1992 (aged 94); Zagreb, Croatia
- Occupations: Politician, writer and publisher

Ante Ciliga (20 February 1898 – 21 October 1992) was a Croatian politician, writer and publisher. Ciliga was one of the earliest leaders of the Communist Party of Yugoslavia (KPJ). Imprisoned in Stalin's Gulags in the 1930s as part of the Great Purge, he later became an ardent Croatian nationalist, anti-communist and ideologue of the fascist Ustaše movement.

== Early life ==
He was born in the small Istrian village of Šegotići (part of Marčana). Istria was then the Austrian Littoral (now in Croatia). The contingencies of history were such that Ciliga, Croat by language and culture, was successively an Austrian citizen until 1919 and then an Italian citizen until 1945. Coming from a family of Croat peasants, his grandfather shared with the young boy "the interest which he showed in Croatian culture and in the struggles for national emancipation directed against the urban Italian bourgeoisie and the German-Austrian administration".

=== Party work ===
Between 1918 and 1921 Ciliga was studying at the Faculty of Arts, Charles University, in Prague. Intrigued by the October Revolution in Russia, he began a Yugoslav Marxist Club and started editing newspapers such as Komunist and Rudé právo. In early spring of 1919 Ciliga participated in the Hungarian Soviet Republic revolution, and on orders of the Yugoslav communist section SRPJ(k) in May 1919 he was sent to the Kingdom of Serbs, Croats and Slovenes (later known as Yugoslavia) where he participated in a military revolt in Varaždin. In early 1921 Ciliga became the main organizer of the Proština rebellion, which was alongside the concurrent Labin rebellion in his native Istria (then party of Italy) one of the first anti-fascist resistance efforts in Europe. After the rebellion failed, fascist squadrons burned his home village Šegotići to the ground in retaliation.

By the time he began his 1921/1922 studies in Vienna, Communist Party of Yugoslavia (KPJ) was declared illegal in its home country. Ciliga participated at the July 1921 conference of the KPJ's executive committee in emigration based in Vienna. In late 1923 he became the chief editor of Borba, KPJ's official gazette, in which he was especially dedicated to debates on the 'national question' and polemics with the 'right-wing' factions of the party whom he accused of defending the Serbian hegemony using a Marxist discourse, which included Sima Marković and Đuka Cvijić among others. In 1924 he doctorated at the Faculty of Philosophy in Zagreb all while remaining very politically active in organization of the party's underground activities.

As a dedicated communist activist, he quickly advanced to the level of the Regional Secretary for Croatia-Slavonia, and already in December 1924, the Central Committee of KPJ. At that time he worked closely with Vladimir Ćopić. He began editing Organizovani radnik (lit. 'Organized Worker'), the most persistent trade union newspaper that was published legally in the period from 1924 until the 6 January Dictatorship of 1929.

=== In the Soviet Union ===
Exiled for his activism from Yugoslavia, he moved to Vienna in 1925 as the local representative of the KPJ and then settled in the Soviet Union, where he lived from October 1926 to December 1935. His first three years in the Soviet Union were spent in Moscow, where he worked as a teacher at the party school for émigré Yugoslav Communists. He was a sympathizer of the Left Opposition. He wrote that one possible reason for the rise of Joseph Stalin was that many Soviet politicians, even committed communists, believed that the Soviet Union had backward Asiatic people who needed a dictatorship.

In 1930, Ciliga taught at the Communist University of Leningrad. Arrested by Stalin's political police, the GPU, because of his opposition to the policies of the Soviet government, he was deported to a labor camp in Siberia. Already expelled from the Yugoslav Communist Party in 1929, he later resigned from his position. In The Russian Enigma, his account of his time in the Soviet Union, originally published in France in 1938, Ciliga described his five-year imprisonment in Soviet prisons and Siberian gulags and extensively criticizes Stalin's totalitarian regime and repression.

=== World War II ===
At the end of 1941, Ciliga returned to the then Independent State of Croatia (NDH), where he was arrested by the Ustashas and imprisoned for one year in the Jasenovac concentration camp. Ciliga later described Jasenovac as a "huge machine" with the sole purpose, that "some be killed as soon as they enter–others, over time... Jasenovac resembled Auschwitz. In Jasenovac, the main thing was not forced labor, but extermination", but "the primitivistic cruelties of Jasenovac distinguished this Balkan Auschwitz". Having been imprisoned in Stalin's Siberian gulags, Ciliga wrote that what he "experienced there did not even remotely reach the physical, material horrors of Jasenovac."

Released from Jasenovac in December 1942, Ciliga contributed to the Ustasha ideological magazine Spremnost. In 1944, he moved to Nazi Berlin, residing in the embassy of NDH.

== Postwar ==
As political émigré, Ciliga lived in Italy and France, where he edited anticommunist and anti-Yugoslav publications. Having abandoned communist politics, he became an "ardent nationalist".

He wrote books criticizing the Tito regime (State Crisis in Tito’s Yugoslavia) and against Serbs (Dokle će hrvatski narod stenjati pod srpskim jarmom? – For how long will the Croatian people groan under the Serbian yoke?). He also criticized Ante Pavelić in the following manner: "With one word, Pavelić [by his policies] disunited the Croats, united the Serbs, strengthened the Communist Partisans, and blindly tied the Croatian cause to those who were bound to lose the war. It is difficult to imagine a more suicidal policy".

Writing years later, Ciliga noted, "I was for the ustasha (sic) state, I was for the Croatian state. And I defend that thesis. The ustasha (sic) state needed to be reformed, not destroyed."

Ciliga was criticized for anti-Semitic remarks in his Jasenovac writings, which were later repeated by Franjo Tuđman in his Jasenovac book, which also caused a storm of criticism. After Croatia's independence, Ciliga returned to Croatia, where he died in 1992.

== Works ==
- The Russian Enigma (1940, 1979)
- The Kronstadt Revolt (1942)
- Štorice iz Proštine (1944, 2004) (Published under the pseudonym of Tone Valić)
- Lenin and Revolution (1948)
- Sibérie, Terre de l'Exil et de l'Industrialisation (1950)
- The Southern Slavic people between East and West, in La Révolution prolétarienne (1950)-
- Dokle ce hrvatski narod stenjati pod srpskim jarmom? (1952)
- La crisi di stato nella Jugoslavia di Tito (1972)
- State Crisis in Tito’s Yugoslavia (1974)
- Sam kroz Europu u ratu (1954, 1978)
- U zemlji velike laži (2007)
- Posljednji hrvatski argonaut dr. Ante Ciliga – razgovori – publisher Matica hrvatska Pazin (2011)

== Bibliography ==
- Bulajić, Milan (1994). The Role of the Vatican in the break-up of the Yugoslav State: The Mission of the Vatican in the Independent State of Croatia. Ustashi Crimes of Genocide. Belgrade: Stručna knjiga.
- Bulajić, Milan (2002). Jasenovac: The Jewish-Serbian Holocaust (the role of the Vatican) in Nazi-Ustasha Croatia (1941–1945). Belgrade: Fund for Genocide Research, Stručna knjiga. ISBN 9788641902211.
