= Tias Mortigjija =

Croatian journalist (1913–1947)

- Born: 7 April 1913; Dubrovnik, Kingdom of Dalmatia, Austria-Hungary
- Died: 14 September 1947 (aged 34) near Samobor, PR Croatia, FPR Yugoslavia
- Cause of death: Execution by firing squad
- Occupations: writer, journalist
- Writing career
- Period: 1941–1945
- Notable work: chief editor of Ustaše weekly news magazine Spremnost

Tias Mortigjija (7 April 1913 – 14 September 1947) was a Croatian journalist, publicist, and member of the Croatian Historical Revolution, best known for his activities during the existence of the Independent State of Croatia. During this period he was chief editor of the most important Croatian newspaper and magazine, Spremnost.

== Early life ==
Mortigjija was born in Dubrovnik, then part of the Austria-Hungary, on 7 April 1913. He attended elementary school and high school in his native town. As a high school student, he began to publish poems, reviews, articles and debates in several Croatian newspapers and magazines. After completing high school in 1931, he enrolled in University of Zagreb, studying history and geography. He completed study in 1940, just before World War II. During his study at the University of Zagreb he continued publishing and served as the editor of various journals between 1933 and 1936. Mortigjija was appointed as an assistant in the department of economic history at the High Economic and Commercial school in Zagreb, but never worked in the position because he was too busy doing editorial work.

In his autobiography, Mortigjija said that in his youth he was a keen Yugoslavian, but his opinion changed in 1928 after Puniša Račić's attack in the Yugoslav Parliament. The assassinations turned Mortigjija to Croatian nationalism. Mortigjija was inspired by the ideas of Ante Starčević who argued in the mid-1800s for an independent Croatian state.

== Career during the Independent State of Croatia ==
Beginning with the establishment of the Independent State of Croatia in April 1941, Mortigjija was editor of the most important national newspaper, Hrvatski narod. In February 1942 he left the newspaper to work as director and chief editor of the newly founded weekly magazine Spremnost, a journal of the Ustaše movement. Mortigjija was a member of the Ustaše movement since 1941, serving as a reserve sergeant and later captain, although he never did subscribe to Ustaše ideology.

Hrvatski narod and Spremnost were typical puppet papers that followed the policy of the Axis powers and in particular the Third Reich. They published anti-Jewish propaganda which quoted text from Deutsche Zeitung—German language newspapers printed by the Nazi Party through Franz Eher Nachfolger. The papers also printed articles about the Serbs, Roma and other "inferior" races. In December 1944 Martigjiga was dismissed from Spremnost, replaced by Franjo Nevistić.

When the collapse of the Independent State of Croatia was imminent, Mortigjija and thirty other journalists fled to Austria on 6 May 1945. While in the refugee camp, Mortigjija accepted a job to organize social activities, events, and lectures on Croatian history. He organized a committee of the Initiative-Croat refugees in Carinthia. He began publishing a newspaper on 1 March 1946 that would become the voice of Croatian refugees in Austria.

== Trial and death ==
At the request of authorities of the new Federal People's Republic of Yugoslavia, the British occupation forces in Austria delivered Mortigjija into Yugoslavia on 2 September 1946. Mortigjija was investigated and put on trial in Zagreb. He was found guilty and was sentenced to "death by firing squad and the loss of all civil rights". The Supreme Court upheld the conviction on 8 September 1947. He was executed on 23 October 1947 in the area of Samobor.

== Later retrial ==
In the late 1990s Tias Mortigjija's son, Mato Mortigjija, petitioned the courts for a new trial for his father. Mato Mortigjija's lawyer, Antun Mihočević, argued a long trial at the County Court in Zagreb. On 18 February 2003 a three judge panel acquitted Tias Mortigjija. "In his writings", noted panel, "Mortigjija did not personally exhibit positive totalitarian elements, and in any case did not approve abuse and intimidation..."

Mortigjija's case is seen as a test case. In 1945, over 40 journalists were executed and 47 were banned from public work. Similar retrials for some of these journalists are expected.

The verdict provoked a divided reaction by the public. Croatian daily newspaper Vjesnik published editorials that denounced the work of Nazi sympathizers such as Mortigjija. Other editorials claimed that the criticism was based on prejudice against the Ustaše movement.

The verdict was greeted in some emigrant circles as a rare example of correcting injustice committed by the communist Yugoslavian government. For example, President of the Association of Croatian Emigrants wrote to former Prime Minister of Croatia Ivo Sanader asking that Mortigjija's case be used as an example for other cases.

== Bibliography ==
- Tias Mortigjija: Dinko Tomašić u pravom svijetlu, Odbor hrvatskih pravnika, Zagreb 1937. (in Croatian)
- Tias Mortigjija: Moj životopis (Priredio Trpimir Macan), Nakladni zavod Matice Hrvatske, Zagreb 1996. ISBN 953-6014-59-9 (in Croatian)
