= Martinska Ves, Sisak-Moslavina County =

Martinska Ves
- Municipality
- Općina Martinska Ves; Municipality of Martinska Ves
- Location in Croatia
- Coordinates: 45°34′48″N 16°22′12″E
- Country: Croatia
- County: Sisak-Moslavina County

Area
  - Municipality: 125.8 km^{2} (48.6 sq mi)
  - Urban: 22.5 km^{2} (8.7 sq mi)

Population (2021)
  - Municipality: 2,861
  - Density: 22.74/km^{2} (58.90/sq mi)
  - Urban: 540
  - Urban density: 24/km^{2} (62/sq mi)
- Time zone: UTC+1 (CET)
  - Summer (DST): UTC+2 (CEST)
- Website: martinskaves.hr

Martinska Ves is a village and a municipality in Sisak-Moslavina County, Croatia.

== Population ==
In the 2011 census, it had a total population of 3,488, in the following settlements:

- Bok Palanječki, population 138
- Desni Dubrovčak, pop. 115
- Desno Trebarjevo, pop. 334
- Desno Željezno, pop. 170
- Jezero Posavsko, pop. 70
- Lijeva Luka, pop. 233
- Lijevo Trebarjevo, pop. 59
- Lijevo Željezno, pop. 9
- Ljubljanica, pop. 31
- Mahovo, pop. 269
- Martinska Ves, pop. 683
- Setuš, pop. 157
- Strelečko, pop. 537
- Tišina Erdedska, pop. 305
- Tišina Kaptolska, pop. 259
- Zirčica, pop. 119

In the same census, 98% of the population were Croats.

== History ==
In the late 19th and early 20th century, Martinska Ves was part of the Zagreb County of the Kingdom of Croatia-Slavonia.

== Notable people ==
- Mihalj Šilobod Bolšić (1724–1787), Roman Catholic priest, mathematician, writer, and musical theorist primarily known for writing the first Croatian arithmetic textbook Arithmatika Horvatzka (published in Zagreb, 1758)
