= Lisa Nemec =

Croatian long-distance runner

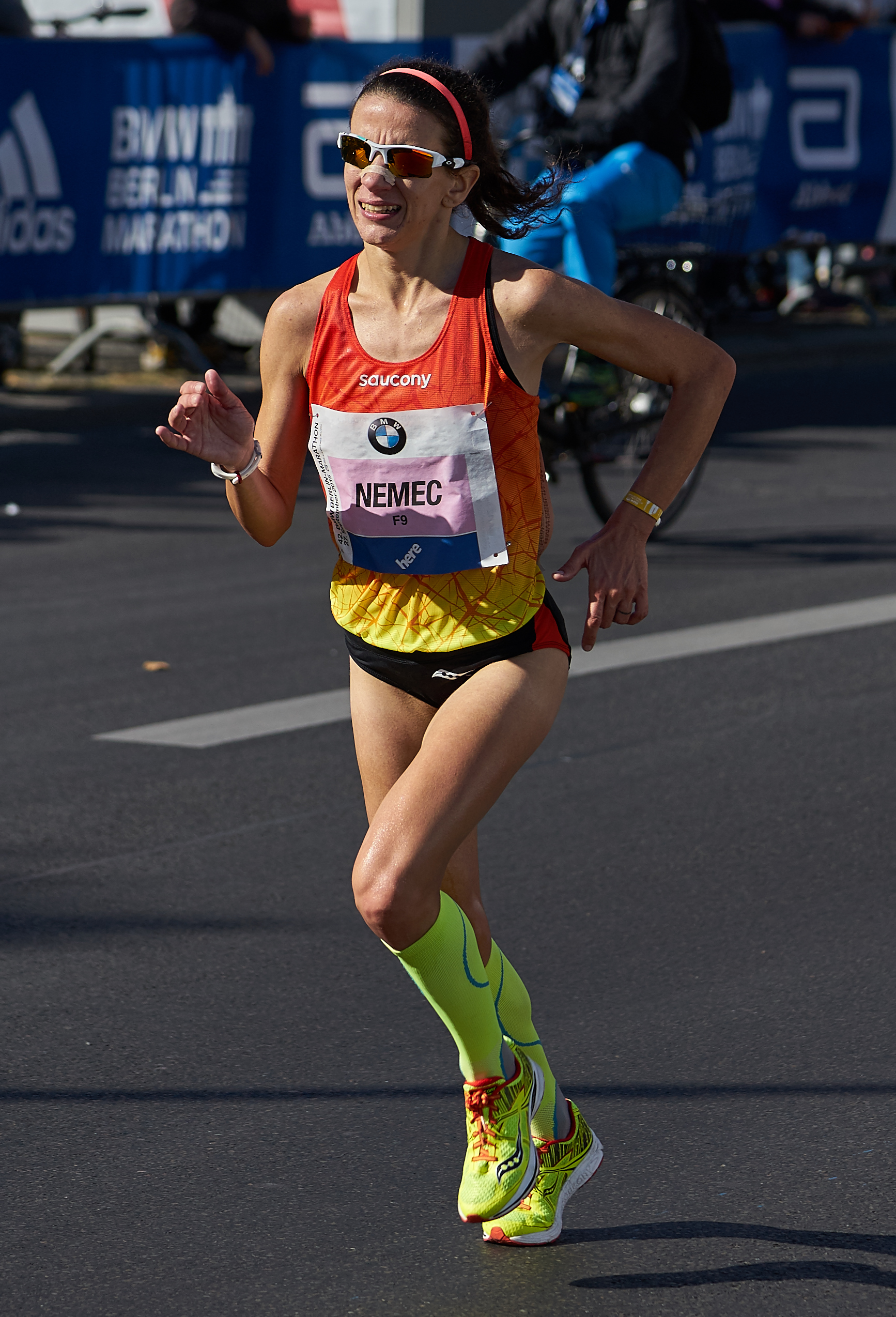
- Nemec at the 2015 Berlin Marathon

Personal information
- Full name: Lisa Christina Nemec
- Born: Lisa Stublić; May 18, 1984 (age 42) Waterbury, Connecticut, U.S.
- Height: 1.59 m (5 ft 2 1/2 in) (2010)
- Weight: 44 kg (97 lb) (2010)
- Website: www.lisastublic.com

Sport
- Country: Croatia
- College team: Columbia Lions
- Club: AC Zagreb Ulix;
- Coached by: Slavko Petrović

Lisa Christina Nemec (née Stublić; born May 18, 1984) is a Croatian American long-distance runner. Born and raised in the United States, where she competed for the Columbia University, Stublić moved to Croatia, her father's homeland, and established herself as a leading long-distance athlete in the country, having set the Croatian records in 3000 meters steeplechase, 5000 meters, half marathon, and marathon. She is the first Croatian marathon runner ever to qualify for the Olympic Games. She finished 52nd in the marathon at the 2012 Olympics.

On 31 March 2016, Nemec was banned for doping for four years following an out-of-competition test taken in October 2015.

== Early life in the United States ==
Stublić was born on May 18, 1984, in Waterbury, Connecticut. Her father was born in Sisak, Croatia, but emigrated to Germany at age 18, then moved to California and finally to Connecticut. Her mother is an American of Italian descent.

As a teenager, Stublić was not interested in running. In high school, Stublić had to pick a sport, but she disliked team sports, and – after she quit swimming on her first training session – running was the last option left. In her first race run on a 4-kilometer (2.5 mi) course, Stublić won two minutes ahead of the rest of the field. With virtually no training, she became one of the top 10,000 m runners in her high school and qualified for the state championship. She set high school best time of 10:51 in 3200m. Among several college athletic scholarship offers, she chose Columbia University and moved to New York in 2002 to study music theory.

At the Columbia University, Stublić started training in earnest for the first time, and improved her 5000-meter results by two minutes in the first two years. In the third and fourth year of college, she switched from 5000 meters to 10,000 meters and steeplechase. She was a member of the women's cross country team that won conference championship titles in each of the four years she competed. Stublić's team qualified for the NCAA Nationals in cross country every year she ran for them, and she earned the All-American honors once, in her senior year, placing 33rd. Despite her athletic achievements, at that time Stublić's primary interest was art – music, poetry and drawing – and she still saw running as little more than a hobby.

After graduating, Stublić lived in New York, working two jobs and began competing for New York Athletic Club. By late 2007, though, she was growing dissatisfied by her financial situation and the fact she could still not find a job as a professor of music. Feeling what she described as a "quarter-life crisis", she decided to move to Croatia for a couple of years and to learn Croatian.

== Athletic career in Croatia ==
Stublić arrived in Croatia in January 2008, staying at first in Sisak, then moving to Zagreb in order to train at the Dinamo-Zrinjevac athletic club. During summer training with the club on Rogla, she met Slavko Petrović, Croatian record holder over 10,000 meters, who was winding down his athletic career and beginning his work as a coach at the AC Zagreb Ulix. She liked his methods and – dissatisfied with her status with Dinamo-Zrinjevac – decided to move to Zagreb Ulix and take Petrović as her coach.

Petrović quickly noticed that Stublić's slight build and running efficiency made her naturally suited to competing over longer distances, rather than middle-distance events she had focused on. In particular, Stublić had already started to develop back problems, caused by the strain of running 3000 meters steeplechase, her favorite event. At first, she was very reserved towards Petrović's suggestion to try the marathon. Still, in December 2008, after only three and a half months of work with her new coach, she set a national record in half marathon. She was finally convinced only when she tried to run for three straight hours in a training session, and found that it was not as difficult or tedious as she expected. Already the top Croatian female distance runner by the end of 2008, having set the season's best marks in 3000 meters, 3000 meters steeplechase, 5000 meters, 10,000 meters and half marathon, Stublić made an agreement with her coach to maintain the focus on the track events in 2009, but to start preparing for the marathon in the autumn of 2009, with the goal of qualifying for the 2012 Summer Olympics in London. The 2009 season was successful for Stublić, as she topped the national year rankings in the same five events again, setting national records over 3000 meters steeplechase and 5000 meters in the process.

After a year of preparation, Stublić made her marathon debut at the 2010 Berlin Marathon. She placed ninth with the time of 2:33:42, well within the Olympic A standard of 2:37. Her fast time came as a surprise to many people, including Stublić herself. Her Berlin marathon not only beat the 21-year-old Croatian record by nearly six minutes, but was also the fastest marathon run by any Croatian athlete in 2010, including men.

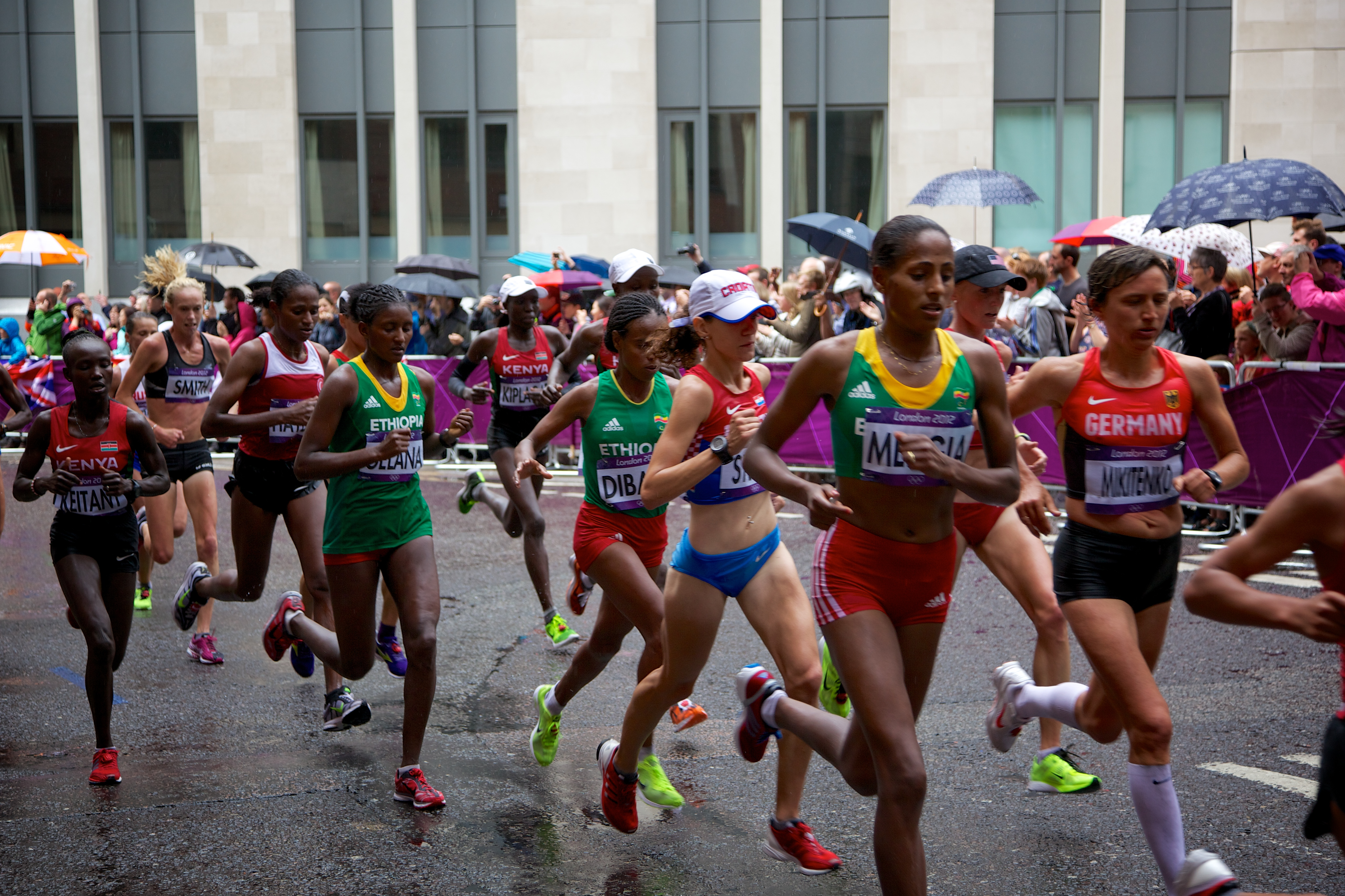
Lisa Stublić (center of the group, wearing a white cap) in the marathon race at the 2012 Olympics

On April 10, 2011, less than a month after placing fourth at the City-Pier-City Loop half marathon in The Hague with a new national record, Stublić competed at the Linz Marathon. She won her second marathon race, clocking 2:30:46, ten minutes ahead of the rest of the women's field, and nearly three minutes faster than her previous personal best and national record. Her time qualified her for the 2012 Summer Olympics, making her the first Croatian marathon runner ever to qualify for the Olympic Games.

On August 27, 2011, Stublić competed in the marathon at the 2011 World Championships in Athletics in Daegu, South Korea. It was her first major championships and only the third marathon race of her career. She placed 27th with the time of 2:36:41, significantly slower than her personal best set earlier in the year, but still within her pre-race expectations. She won the 2012 Vidovdan 10K in Bosnia by a margin of almost a minute.

She improved her best in the half marathon twice in 2012, first running 72:07 minutes at the Roma-Ostia Half Marathon, then setting a time of 70:31 at the national championships in Zagreb. That year she represented Croatia in the marathon at the 2012 London Olympics (timing 2:34:03 hours for 52nd place) and placed ninth at the 2012 European Cross Country Championships. Stublić came third at the NYC Half Marathon in March 2013 and her run of 69:18 minutes was another big improvement to her national record mark. In April 2013, Stublić won the Zurich Marathon in 2:25:44, slicing nearly 5 minutes off her Croatian National Record. In November 2013, Stublić returned to New York City for the NYC Marathon finishing 12th in 2:34:49 and leading the New York Athletic Club to the team victory.

== Personal bests ==
Personal bests as of November 2015
Surface	Event	Time (h:m:s)	Venue	Date
Track	3000 m	9:12.10	Pula, Croatia	March 21, 2015
Track	3000 m st	10:09.56 NR	Ljubljana, Slovenia	June 1, 2009
Track	5000 m	15:59.48 NR	Pula, Croatia	March 2, 2013
Track	10,000 m	33:17.91	Sinj, Croatia	April 5, 2014
Road	10 km	33:20	Karlovac, Croatia	June 14, 2013
Road	15 km	52:49	Lijevo Trebarjevo, Croatia	June 12, 2012
Road	Half marathon	1:09:18 NR	New York City, United States	March 17, 2013
Road	Marathon	2:25:44 NR	Zurich, Switzerland	April 7, 2013
