= Spremnost =

- Editor: Ivo Bogdan (beginning of 1942); Tias Mortigjija (from May 1942 until Christmas 1944); Franjo Nevistić (from Christmas 1944 until breakdown in 1945); Fabijan Lovoković (from December 1957 until 2007)
- Categories: Newsmagazine
- Frequency: weekly
- Founded: 1942
- Final issue: 2007
- Company: Ustaški nakladni zavod
- Country: Independent State of Croatia and Australia
- Language: Croatian

Spremnost was a weekly newsmagazine of the Ustaše movement with articles about many topics like politics, war, economy and culture. It was published in Zagreb from early 1942 to the collapse of the Independent State of Croatia in May 1945. Its publication was restarted in 1957 in Sydney by Fabijan Lovoković, a former Ustaše Youth member who had fled to Australia in 1950. Publication of the magazine ceased in 2007.

== Founding and breakdown ==
Since the establishment of the Independent State of Croatia the leading Croatian dailies, have become; Hrvatski narod and Nova Hrvatska, the leading ideological weekly newspaper of general type was Spremnost.

Other newspapers that are coming out then were; weekly humorous magazine Šilo, newspapers Gospodarstvo, Hrvatski radnik, Plug, Plava revija, Hrvatska revija and Vijenac.

Newsmagazine Spremnost was initiated only when the Ustaša regime mastered the methods of total control of the press. The initiator and main organizer was Ivo Bogdan and chief editor was Tias Mortigjija (until 1944). In addition with Mortigjija and Bogdan, the magazine regularly published articles on politics by Milivoj Magdić, Savić Štedimlija and Ante Ciliga (since 1943). Magdić was responsible for the critique of Marxism–Leninism, Štedimlija was some kind of specialist in Balkans issues, especially for the Chetnik movement, and Ciliga wrote about the Soviet Union (where he had lived from October 1926 to December 1935). Other important collaborators were Ljubomir Maraković (literature), Ton Smerdel, Radoslav Glavaš, Albert Haler, Antun Barac and Mihovil Kombol.

Overall Spremnost was a typical puppet news magazine of this time with a strong nationalistic note; it defended the policy of its sponsors, and critical writing about politics of Allies tried to show his politics as disastrous for Europe.

Allies are generally portrayed as unnatural interest coalition of Jews, Freemasonry and Communists. Thus, to illustrate the Spremnost published on 13 September 1942. Ivo Bogdan article that says that the Independent State of Croatia must resist »the Jews, freemasons, communists«, as internal enemies, with »courage, determination and political foresight«.

Even when it was clear that the Axis powers have lost the war - the Allied successes were depicted in an entirely different light, or are completely minimized. In this light is described Allied invasion of Sicily - as a completely insignificant event, which does not have any military significance in relation to the main east front.

The editor of the Australian publication, Fabijan Lovoković, was a founder and leading figure of the far-right Ustasĕ Croatian Liberation Movement (Croatian: Hrvatski oslobodilački pokret, HOP) branch in Australia. This group is regarded as being responsible for many terrorist acts in the post-WW2 era.

== Literature ==
- Macan, Trpimir, Bogišić, Vlaho i drugi: Spremnost : 1942-1945, Zagreb : Matica hrvatska, 1998 godina, ISBN 953-150-161-0 (in Croatian)
