= Proština =

Proština is a historical name for a region of southeastern Istria. The region is famous for the Proština rebellion, one of the first European anti-fascist uprisings.

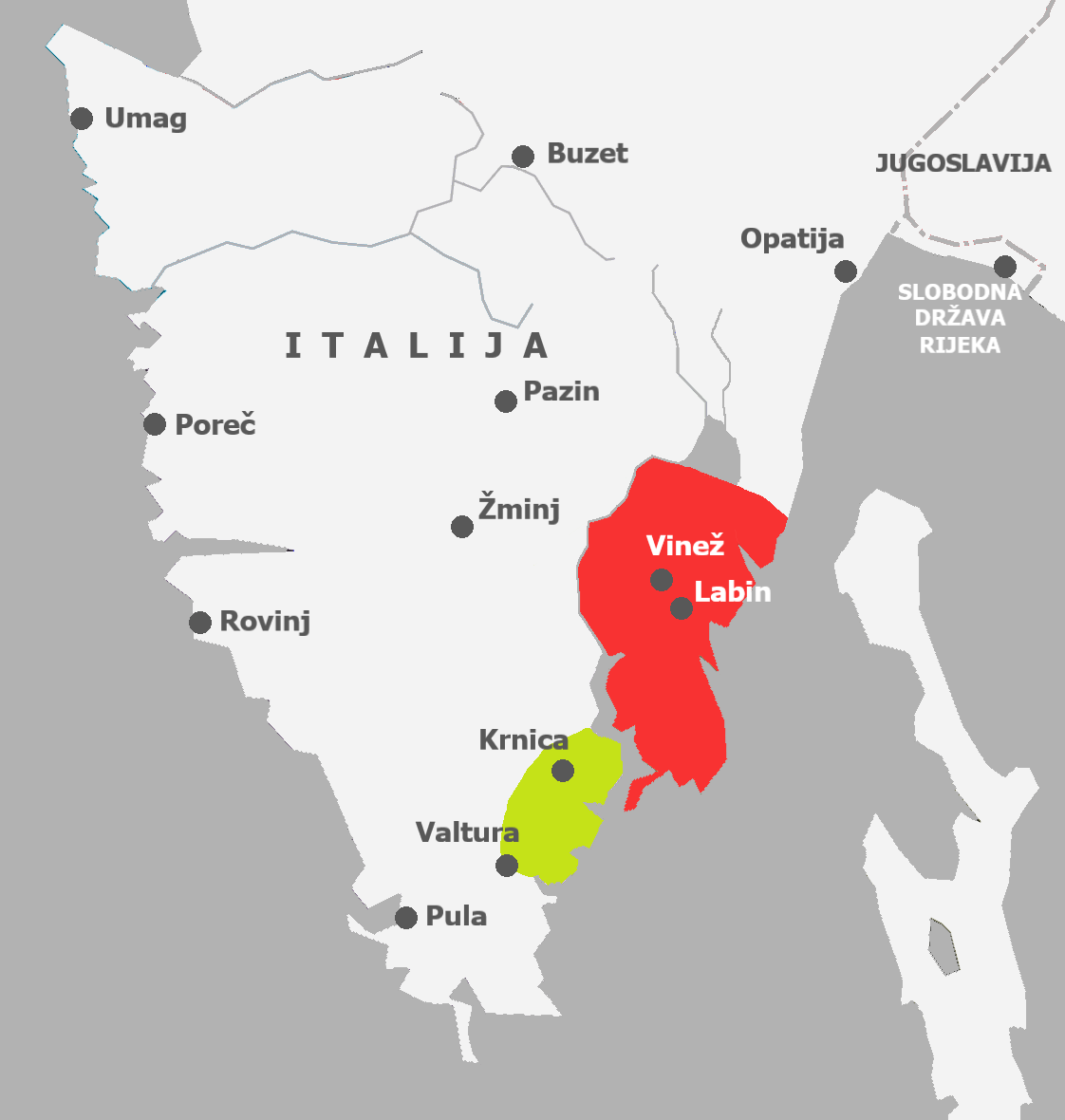
Proština region in green and Labin Republic in red (1921)
