= Proština rebellion =

Rebellion in modern day Croatia

Proština rebellion Proštinska buna (Croatian)
- Part of the Revolutions of 1917–1923
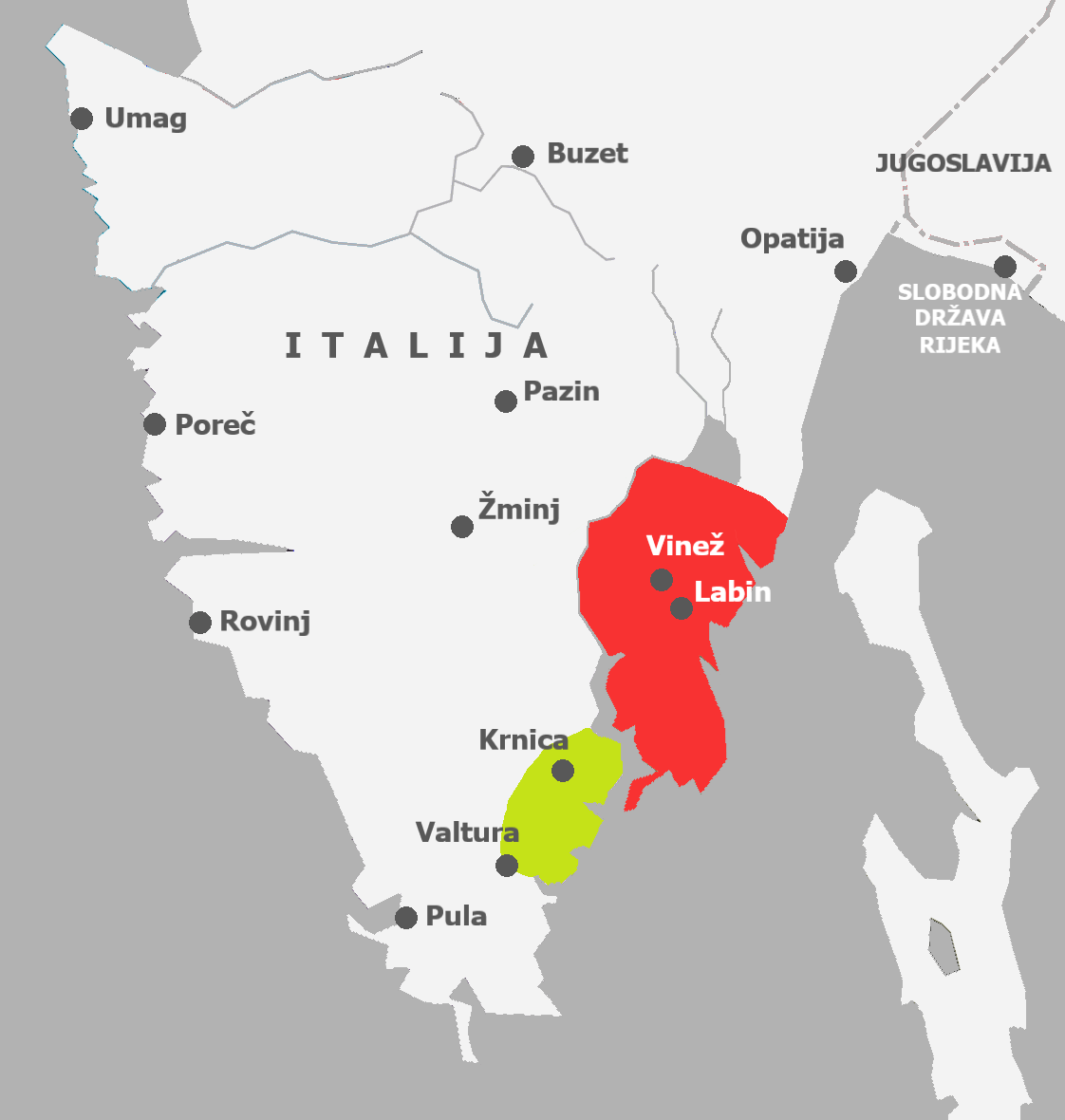
- Proština region shown in green, neighbouring Labin Republic shown in red
- Date: February 1921 - 5 April 1921
- Location: Proština, Istria, Italy (modern-day Croatia)
- Caused by: Fascist terror
- Goals: Suppression of fascist violence and discrimination
- Result: Government victory: Civilians arrested; Village of Šegotići burned to the ground

Parties
Civilians led by Ante Ciliga: Communist Party of Italy	(Kingdom of Italy) Government of Italy: Royal Italian Army; Polizia di Stato; National Fascist Party

Lead figures
Ante Ciliga (POW)	Unknown

Number
300 local peasants	400 troops and policemen; 100 Blackshirts

Casualties
- Death: Unknown number
- Arrested: 400

The Proština rebellion was a rebellion by peasants in Istria, then a territory of the Kingdom of Italy, against the fascist government. It began in early February 1921 and was quelled on 5 April 1921. Almost at the same time, a miners' uprising known as the Labin Republic took place in the neighboring Labin region. It was one of the first anti-fascist uprisings in Europe.

In order to intimidate the population, fascist squadrons were intruding into Istrian villages. The first such incursion to Krnica and Proština was undertaken on the night of 2–3 February 1921, the second in mid-March, and the third in early April of the same year. Local peasants therefore decided to form an organized resistance. The main organizer of the resistance was Ante Ciliga, who, together with the communists there, founded a party organization in Proština. On several occasions, the rebels emphasized in writing to the local authorities and the Carabinieri that their action was not an anti-state uprising, but only a (self-) defensive action directed against the fascist terror.

During conflict in early April 1921, the Proština rebels managed to capture two fascists, while the other fascists retreated to Marčana and Krnica, taking with them the innkeeper Ivan Macuka as a hostage, whom the Proština rebels eventually freed. After these events, units of the regular army and police with about 400 members, and with about 100 members of the fascist squadrons invaded the villages of Proština on 5 April 1921 and broke the resistance of the three hundred or so poorly armed peasants there. The fascists burned the village of Šegotići and several other houses in other villages.

About 400 participants of the Proština rebellion were arrested and taken to the Pula remand prison. Fascists and soldiers beat and mistreated arrested anti-fascists on the way, and several people died as a result of the beatings. Gradually, the anti-fascists were released from prison and later, in the context of the process of wider political amnesty, all were released.

== See also ==
- Biennio Rosso
- Krnica
- Labin Republic
- Red Republic of Caulonia
