= Veliki Vareški =

- Village
- Location within Croatia
- Coordinates: 44.9406°N 13.9906°E
- Country: Croatia
- County: Istria County
- Municipality: Marčana

Area
  - Total: 1.1 sq mi (2.8 km^{2})

Population (2021)
  - Total: 16
  - Density: 15/sq mi (5.7/km^{2})
- Time zone: UTC+1 (CET)
  - Summer (DST): UTC+2 (CEST)
- Postal code: 52208 Krnica
- Area code: 052

Veliki Vareški is a village in Croatia, part of the Municipality of Marčana, Istria County.
