= Filipana =

Filipana Filippano
- Village
- Location within Croatia
- Coordinates: 44.9990747°N 13.9285865°E
- Country: Croatia
- County: Istria County
- Municipality: Marčana

Area
  - Total: 2.2 sq mi (5.8 km^{2})

Population (2021)
  - Total: 93
  - Density: 42/sq mi (16/km^{2})
- Time zone: UTC+1 (CET)
  - Summer (DST): UTC+2 (CEST)
- Postal code: 52206 Marčana
- Area code: 052

Filipana (Italian: Filippano) is a village in Marčana municipality in Istria County, Croatia.

== Demographics ==
According to the 2021 census, its population was 93.
