= Pavle Radić =

Croatian politician (1880–1928)

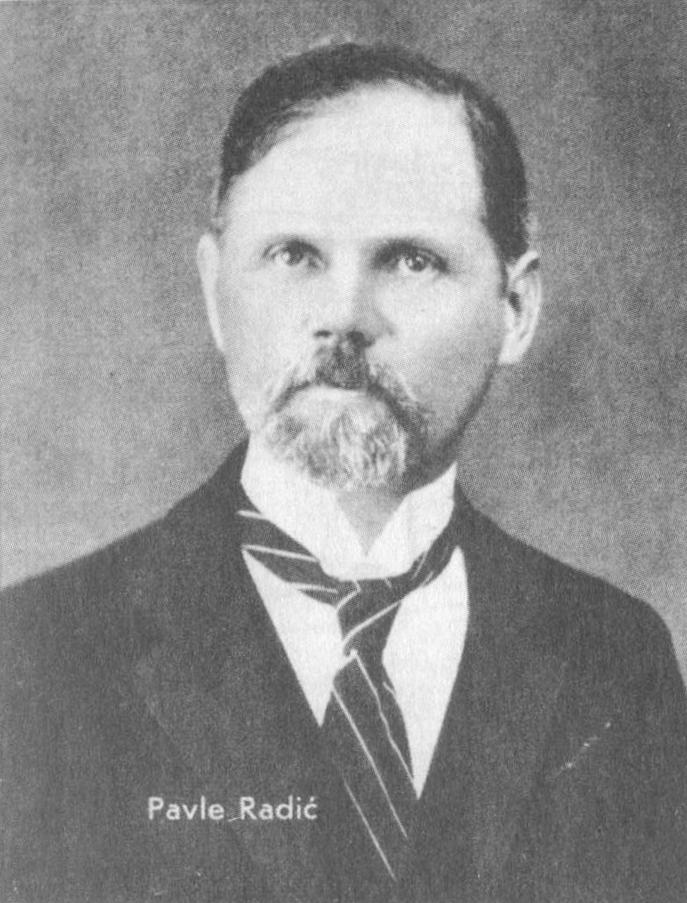
- Radić in the 1920s

Minister of Land Reform of the Kingdom of Serbs, Croats and Slovenes
- In office 1925–1926

Personal details
- Born: 10 January 1880 Desno Trebarjevo, Croatia-Slavonia, Austria-Hungary (now Martinska Ves, Croatia)
- Died: 20 June 1928 (aged 48) Belgrade, Kingdom of Serbs, Croats and Slovenes (now Serbia)
- Resting place: Mirogoj Cemetery, Zagreb, Croatia
- Party: Croatian Peasant Party
- Occupation: Politician

Pavle Radić (10 January 1880 – 20 June 1928) was a Croatian politician and member of the Croatian People's Peasant Party (HPSS).

Radić was shot and killed in parliament by the Serbian radical politician Puniša Račić. This assassination further alienated the Croats and the Serbs and initiated the breakdown of the parliamentary system, culminating in the 6 January Dictatorship of 1929.

== Biography ==
=== Assassination in Parliament ===
In the Assembly, Puniša Račić, a member of the People's Radical Party, got up and made a provocative speech which produced a stormy reaction from the opposition but Radić himself stayed completely silent. Finally, Ivan Pernar shouted in response, "thou plundered beys" (referring to accusations of corruption related to him). In an earlier speech Radić accused Račić of stealing from civilian population and later refused to apologize when Račić asked him to. Puniša Račić made his way to the speaker podium facing the Croats. He put his hand in his pocket, where he held the revolver, and faced the president Ninko Perić and told him: "I ask of you, Mr. President, to sanction Pernar. If you fail to stop me, I shall punish him myself!" After that threat shouting started in the room. But Račić continued his threats: "Whoever tries to stand between me and Pernar will be killed!"

At that moment Puniša Račić took out his parabellum. Minister Milorad Vujičić, sitting at the bench behind Račić, grabbed his hand in order to stop him. At the same time, minister Kujundžić came to his aid, but Račić, however, being very strong, broke himself free. At exactly 11:25 AM shots were fired and Pernar was hit 1 cm above the heart. When he collapsed, Račić took aim at Stjepan Radić. Đuro Basariček noticed this and leaped to help him. Račić, however, turned his way and shot him, bullet entering his loins and exiting around his scapula. Basariček fainted immediately. Ivan Granđa ran in front of Stjepan Radić and Račić shot him in the arm. As soon as he was down, Račić aimed at Stjepan Radić, and shot him in the chest.

At that point Pavle Radić jumped towards Račić, who didn't get confused, but remarked: "Ha! I've been looking for you!" and fatally shot him 1 cm below the heart. It was believed Račić would shoot Svetozar Pribičević, sitting next to Stjepan Radić, next, but Račić instead left the room through the ministers' chambers. The whole assassination was over in less than a minute. It was one of the first assassinations in a government building in history. This assassination was seen as causing a permanent rift in Croat–Serb relations in the old Yugoslavia.

Following the political crisis triggered by the shooting, in January 1929, King Aleksandar Karađorđević abolished the constitution, dissolved the parliament, banned all ethnic, regional and religious political parties, and declared a royal dictatorship.

Radić is buried in the Mirogoj Cemetery in Zagreb.
