= Bratulići =

Bratulići Bratelli
- Village
- Location within Croatia
- Coordinates: 45.0060734°N 13.9771659°E
- Country: Croatia
- County: Istria County
- Municipality: Marčana

Area
  - Total: 0.50 sq mi (1.3 km^{2})

Population (2021)
  - Total: 40
  - Density: 80/sq mi (31/km^{2})
- Time zone: UTC+1 (CET)
  - Summer (DST): UTC+2 (CEST)
- Postal code: 52207 Barban
- Area code: 052

Bratulići (Italian: Bratelli) is a village in Marčana municipality in Istria County, Croatia.

== Demographics ==
According to the 2021 census, its population was 40.
