= Pavićini =

Pavićini Pavicini
- Village
- Location within Croatia
- Coordinates: 44.923073°N 14.0002454°E
- Country: Croatia
- County: Istria County
- Municipality: Marčana

Area
  - Total: 1.2 sq mi (3.1 km^{2})

Population (2021)
  - Total: 79
  - Density: 66/sq mi (25/km^{2})
- Time zone: UTC+1 (CET)
  - Summer (DST): UTC+2 (CEST)
- Postal code: 52208 Krnica
- Area code: 052

Pavićini (Italian: Pavicini) is a village in Marčana municipality in Istria County, Croatia.

== Demographics ==
According to the 2021 census, its population was 79.
