= Mali Vareški =

Mali Vareški Vareschi Piccolo
- Village
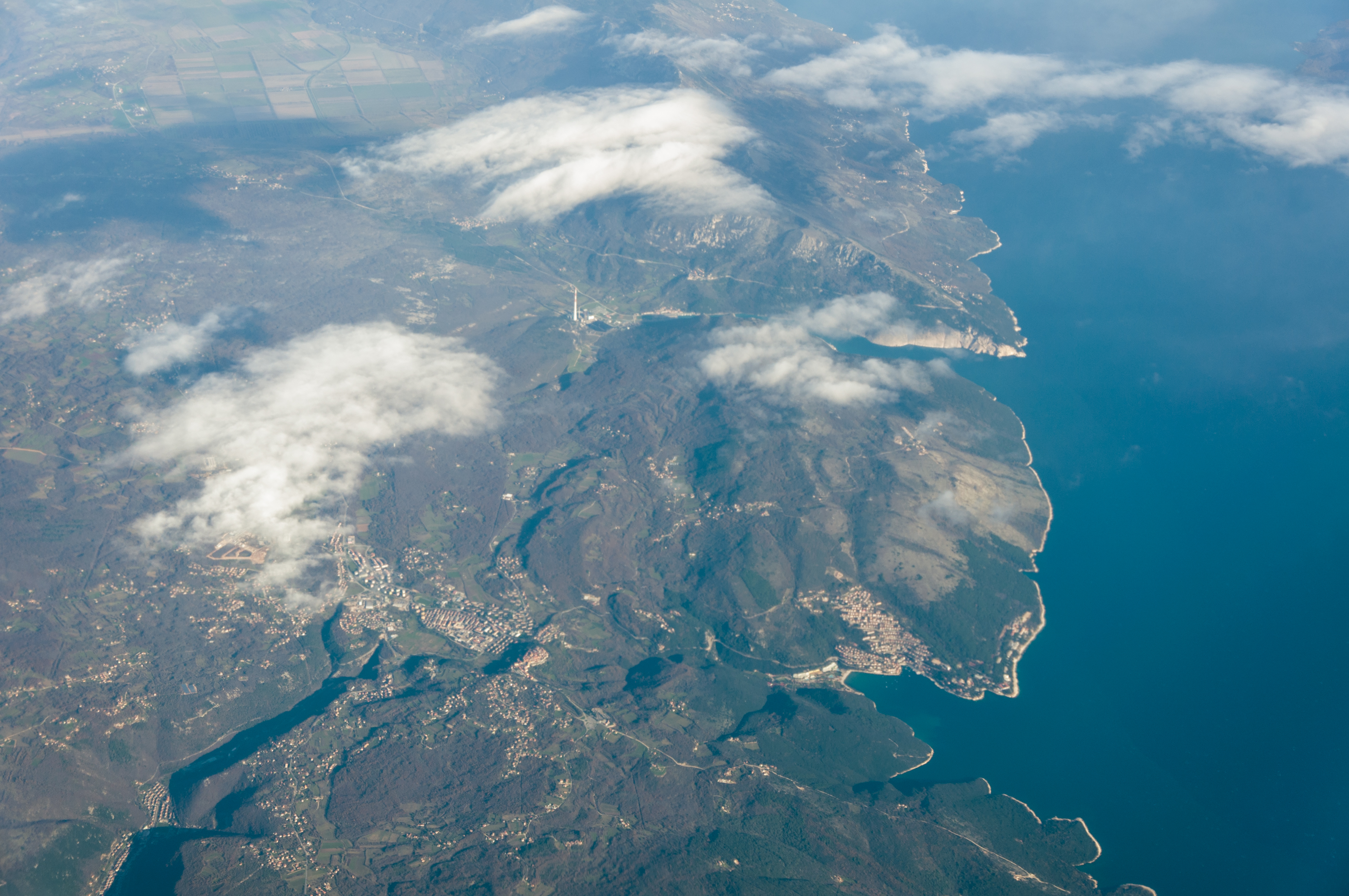

- Location within Croatia
- Coordinates: 44.9429853°N 13.99318°E
- Country: Croatia
- County: Istria County
- Municipality: Marčana

Area
  - Total: 0.54 sq mi (1.4 km^{2})

Population (2021)
  - Total: 81
  - Density: 150/sq mi (58/km^{2})
- Time zone: UTC+1 (CET)
  - Summer (DST): UTC+2 (CEST)
- Postal code: 52208 Krnica
- Area code: 052

Mali Vareški (Italian: Vareschi Piccolo) is a village in Marčana municipality in Istria County, Croatia.

== Demographics ==
According to the 2021 census, its population was 81.
