= Jezero Posavsko =

- Village
- Location within Croatia
- Coordinates: 45°38′N 16°19′E
- Country: Croatia
- County: Sisak-Moslavina County
- Municipality: Martinska Ves

Area
  - Total: 5.9 km^{2} (2.3 sq mi)

Population (2021)
  - Total: 56
  - Density: 9.5/km^{2} (25/sq mi)
- Time zone: UTC+1 (CET)
  - Summer (DST): UTC+2 (CEST)

Jezero Posavsko is a village in Croatia.
