= Hreljići, Croatia =

Hreljići Cregli
- Village
- Location within Croatia
- Coordinates: 45.0215208°N 13.9713893°E
- Country: Croatia
- County: Istria County
- Municipality: Marčana

Area
  - Total: 1.3 sq mi (3.4 km^{2})

Population (2021)
  - Total: 71
  - Density: 54/sq mi (21/km^{2})
- Time zone: UTC+1 (CET)
  - Summer (DST): UTC+2 (CEST)
- Postal code: 52207 Barban
- Area code: 052

Hreljići (Italian: Cregli) is a village in Marčana municipality in Istria County, Croatia.

== Demographics ==
According to the 2021 census, its population was 71.
