= Divšići =

Divšići Divisici
- Village
- Location within Croatia
- Coordinates: 44.9849872°N 13.8942497°E
- Country: Croatia
- County: Istria County
- Municipality: Marčana

Area
  - Total: 3.0 sq mi (7.7 km^{2})

Population (2021)
  - Total: 162
  - Density: 54/sq mi (21/km^{2})
- Time zone: UTC+1 (CET)
  - Summer (DST): UTC+2 (CEST)
- Postal code: 52206 Marčana
- Area code: 052

Divšići (Italian: Divisici) is a village in Marčana municipality in Istria County, Croatia.

== Demographics ==
According to the 2021 census, its population was 162.
