= Orbanići, Marčana =

Orbanići Orbani
- Village
- Location within Croatia
- Coordinates: 45.0097882°N 13.9018308°E
- Country: Croatia
- County: Istria County
- Municipality: Marčana

Area
  - Total: 1.9 sq mi (4.8 km^{2})

Population (2021)
  - Total: 141
  - Density: 76/sq mi (29/km^{2})
- Time zone: UTC+1 (CET)
  - Summer (DST): UTC+2 (CEST)
- Postal code: 52206 Marčana
- Area code: 052

Orbanići (Italian: Orbani) is a village in Marčana municipality in Istria County, Croatia.

== Demographics ==
According to the 2021 census, its population was 141.
