= Kavran =

Kavran Cavrano
- Village
- Location within Croatia
- Coordinates: 44.9106463°N 13.9814465°E
- Country: Croatia
- County: Istria County
- Municipality: Marčana

Area
  - Total: 3.8 sq mi (9.8 km^{2})

Population (2021)
  - Total: 121
  - Density: 32/sq mi (12/km^{2})
- Time zone: UTC+1 (CET)
  - Summer (DST): UTC+2 (CEST)
- Postal code: 52208 Krnica
- Area code: 052

Kavran (Italian: Cavrano) is a village in Marčana municipality in Istria County, Croatia.

== Demographics ==
According to the 2021 census, its population was 121.
