= Pinezići, Marčana =

Pinezići Pinesi
- Village
- Location within Croatia
- Coordinates: 45.0021024°N 13.9976771°E
- Country: Croatia
- County: Istria County
- Municipality: Marčana

Area
  - Total: 0.97 sq mi (2.5 km^{2})

Population (2021)
  - Total: 40
  - Density: 41/sq mi (16/km^{2})
- Time zone: UTC+1 (CET)
  - Summer (DST): UTC+2 (CEST)
- Postal code: 52206 Marčana
- Area code: 052

Pinezići (Italian: Pinesi) is a village in Marčana municipality in Istria County, Croatia.

== Demographics ==
According to the 2021 census, its population was 40.
