= The Red and the Black (1985 film) =

1985 Croatian film

The Red and the Black (Croatian: Crveni i crni) is a 1985 Croatian language Yugoslav film directed by Miroslav Mikuljan, starring Bekim Fehmiu, Milan Štrljić, Olivera Ježina, and Radko Polič. The film is about the 1921 Labin Republic in Istria, during the world's first anti-fascist uprising.

== Sources ==
- Crveni i crni (in Croatian)
