= Giovanni Pippan =

Italian-American labor leader and socialist

Giovanni Pippan (also known as Giovanni Pipan and Ivan Pipan) (16 December 1894, Trieste – 31 August 1933, Cicero, Illinois) was an Italian-American labor leader and socialist, active in Italy and the United States of America.

== Early life ==
Giovanni Pippan was born to Valentino Pippan and Maria Brissek in Trieste. He was married and widowed some time before 1921.

== The Albona Republic ==
In the spring of 1921 Pippan was sent by the regional committee of the Italian Socialist Party to organise the striking miners of Labin (Albona) on the Istrian peninsula. On March 1 he was caught by a group of fascists at the railway station in Pazin, where he was beaten. The news reached Albona the following day and on 3 March the miners assembled and decided to occupy the mine works in response.

The miners proclaimed the Labin Republic in the occupied mines on 7 March with the slogan Kova je nasa ("The mine is ours"). They organized a government and the so-called red guard as a protection from the Italian law enforcement and started to manage the production of mines by themselves with the support of a section of farmers. On April 8, 1921 the Italian authorities, responding to requests for intervention from the mine owners, decided to suppress the republic using military force. 52 of the rebellion’s leaders were indicted for various crimes, with Pippan being first on the charge sheet. Lawyers Edmondo Puecher, Guido Zennaro and Egidio Cerlenizza successfully defended the accused, and the jury issued an acquittal. Shortly afterwards, because of the threat to his life from fascists if he remained in Italy, he left for the United States.

== Chicago ==
In the United States, Pippan helped organise the silk workers of Paterson, New Jersey. He was also active in the campaign to save Sacco and Vanzetti and fought against fascist elements in the Italian immigrant community. He became a member of the American Communist Party (1926–1931). In 1931 he went to Chicago where he became involved in the unionisation of bread delivery drivers.

In the 1920s and 1930s bakeries in Chicago were controlled by criminal racketeers and delivered bread from door to door on horse-drawn carts. The drivers wanted to reduce their long hours and increase their pay, so in 1933 they approached the Socialist Federation to ask for help in forming a union. Pippan not only formed a drivers’ union, but also began trying to persuade the bakers themselves to unionise and free themselves of racketeer control. He was assassinated in Cicero, Illinois, most likely by the Italian-American mafia or by fascist sympathizers in the Italian community. The date is variously given as 29 or 31 August 1933.
