= Peruški =

Peruški Peruschi
- Village
- Location within Croatia
- Coordinates: 44.9425163°N 13.9839764°E
- Country: Croatia
- County: Istria County
- Municipality: Marčana

Area
  - Total: 3.7 sq mi (9.5 km^{2})

Population (2021)
  - Total: 215
  - Density: 59/sq mi (23/km^{2})
- Time zone: UTC+1 (CET)
  - Summer (DST): UTC+2 (CEST)
- Postal code: 52208 Krnica
- Area code: 052

Peruški (Italian: Peruschi) is a village in Marčana municipality in Istria County, Croatia.

== Demographics ==
According to the 2021 census, its population was 215.
