= Prodol =

- Village
- Location within Croatia
- Coordinates: 44.9916365°N 13.962133°E
- Country: Croatia
- County: Istria County
- Municipality: Marčana

Area
  - Total: 2.1 sq mi (5.5 km^{2})

Population (2021)
  - Total: 86
  - Density: 40/sq mi (16/km^{2})
- Time zone: UTC+1 (CET)
  - Summer (DST): UTC+2 (CEST)
- Postal code: 52208 Krnica
- Area code: 052

Prodol is a village in Marčana municipality in Istria County, Croatia.

== Demographics ==
According to the 2021 census, its population was 86.
