= Kujići =

Kujići Cuici
- Village
- Location within Croatia
- Coordinates: 45.0141175°N 13.9732274°E
- Country: Croatia
- County: Istria County
- Municipality: Marčana

Area
  - Total: 0.35 sq mi (0.9 km^{2})

Population (2021)
  - Total: 69
  - Density: 200/sq mi (77/km^{2})
- Time zone: UTC+1 (CET)
  - Summer (DST): UTC+2 (CEST)
- Postal code: 52207 Barban
- Area code: 052

Kujići (Italian: Cuici) is a village in Marčana municipality in Istria County, Croatia.

== Demographics ==
According to the 2021 census, its population was 70-1.
