= Šarići, Croatia =

Šarići Sarici
- Village
- Location within Croatia
- Coordinates: 44.9776268°N 13.9266399°E
- Country: Croatia
- County: Istria County
- Municipality: Marčana

Area
  - Total: 1.2 sq mi (3.2 km^{2})

Population (2021)
  - Total: 93
  - Density: 75/sq mi (29/km^{2})
- Time zone: UTC+1 (CET)
  - Summer (DST): UTC+2 (CEST)
- Postal code: 52206 Marčana
- Area code: 052

Šarići (Italian: Sarici) is a village in Marčana municipality in Istria County, Croatia.

== Demographics ==
According to the 2021 census, its population was 93.
