= Slatina, Andrijevica =

Slatina Слатина
- Village
- Location within Montenegro
- Country: Montenegro
- Municipality: Andrijevica

Population (2023)
  - Total: 20
- Time zone: UTC+1 (CET)
  - Summer (DST): UTC+2 (CEST)

Slatina (Serbian Cyrillic: Слатина) is a village in the municipality of Andrijevica, Montenegro.

== Demographics ==
According to the 2023 census, it had a population of 20 people.

Ethnicity in 2011
Ethnicity	Number	Percentage
Serbs	312	69.5%
Montenegrins	121	26.9%
other/undeclared	16	3.6%
Total	449	100%
