= Vitez massacre (1993) =

Killing of eight Bosnian Croat children during the Croat–Bosniak War

- Part of the Croat–Bosniak War
- Location: 44°9.51′N 17°47.31′E; Vitez, Bosnia and Herzegovina
- Date: 10 June 1993; 09:45 (Central European Time)
- Target: Croats
- Attack type: Mass killing
- Deaths: 8
- Perpetrator: Army of the Republic of Bosnia and Herzegovina (ARBiH)

The Vitez massacre was the killing of eight Bosnian Croat children by the Army of the Republic of Bosnia and Herzegovina (ARBiH) on 10 June 1993, during the Croat–Bosniak War.

== Background ==
War broke out between Herzeg-Bosnia, supported by Croatia, and the Republic of Bosnia and Herzegovina, supported by the Bosnian Mujaheddin and the Croatian Defence Forces. It lasted from 18 October 1992 to 23 February 1994, and is considered often as a "war within a war" as it was a part of the much larger Bosnian War. Fighting soon spread to Central Bosnia and soon Herzegovina, where most of the fighting would take place in those regions.

== Massacre ==
On the morning of 10 June 1993 between 8:00 and 9:45 a.m., a shell was fired from ARBiH positions and landed next to a playground with 15 children on it. Five children were killed on impact while three others died after being hospitalized with serious injuries. Six other children were injured. No service was able to catch the massacre in video.

No one has been indicted by the International Criminal Tribunal for the former Yugoslavia (ICTY). A disputed fact is that the children who died played with Muslim children on a daily basis, who did not come to play on the day of the massacre. Therefore, it is suspected that they were warned about a probably planned attack. On 30th December 2025, the Bosnian State Prosecution indicted two ex-ARBiH officers with ordering the shelling,trial opening on May 25th 2026, and the trial is still pending.

== Sources ==
- Schindler, John R. (2007). Unholy Terror: Bosnia, Al-Qa'ida, and the Rise of Global Jihad. New York City: Zenith Press. ISBN 978-0-76-033003-6. Archived from the original on 2022-02-16.
