= Desno Trebarjevo =

- Village
- Interactive map of Desno Trebarjevo
- Coordinates: 45.5946°N 16.3437°E
- Country: Croatia

Area
  - Total: 3.4 sq mi (8.8 km^{2})

Population (2021)
  - Total: 273
  - Density: 80/sq mi (31/km^{2})
- Time zone: UTC+1 (CET)
  - Summer (DST): UTC+2 (CEST)

Desno Trebarjevo is a village in Croatia, situated at an altitude of 97m, 15 kilometres (9 mi) from to Sisak.

== Population ==
Village of Desno Trebarjevo: Population trends 1857–2021
v

population	484	555	531	587	591	603	562	580	578	590	568	513	482	435	396	334	273
	1857	1869	1880	1890	1900	1910	1921	1931	1948	1953	1961	1971	1981	1991	2001	2011	2021

Note:Includes data from the former village of Desna Luka which was independent until 1948. Sources: Croatian Bureau of Statistics publications

== Notable people ==
Notable people that were born or lived in Desno Trebarjevo include:

- Antun Radić (1868 - 1919)
- Stjepan Radić (1871 - 1928)
- Pavle Radić (1880 - 1928)
