= Mahovo =

- Village
- Location within Croatia
- Coordinates: 45°34′N 16°25′E
- Country: Croatia
- County: Sisak-Moslavina County

Area
  - Total: 14.0 km^{2} (5.4 sq mi)

Population (2021)
  - Total: 233
  - Density: 16.6/km^{2} (43.1/sq mi)
- Time zone: UTC+1 (CET)
  - Summer (DST): UTC+2 (CEST)

Mahovo is a village in Croatia. It is on the Sava river, about 15km north of Sisak.
