= Šegotići =

Settlement in the Republic of Croatia

Šegotići Segotti
- Village
- Location within Croatia
- Country: Croatia
- County: Istria County
- Municipality: Marčana

Area
  - Total: 1.2 sq mi (3.1 km^{2})

Population (2021)
  - Total: 86
  - Density: 72/sq mi (28/km^{2})
- Time zone: UTC+1 (CET)
  - Summer (DST): UTC+2 (CEST)
- Postal code: 52208 Krnica
- Area code: 052

Šegotići (Italian: Segotti) is a settlement in the Republic of Croatia, part of the Municipality of Marčana, Istria County.

== History ==
In April 1921 during Proština rebellion, village was burned to the ground by the fascist squadrons.

== Demographics ==
According to the 2021 census, its population was 86.

According to the 2001 census, the settlement had 94 inhabitants and 32 households.

== See also ==
- Marčana
- Krnica
- Proština rebellion
