= Đuro Basariček =

Croatian politician (1884–1928)

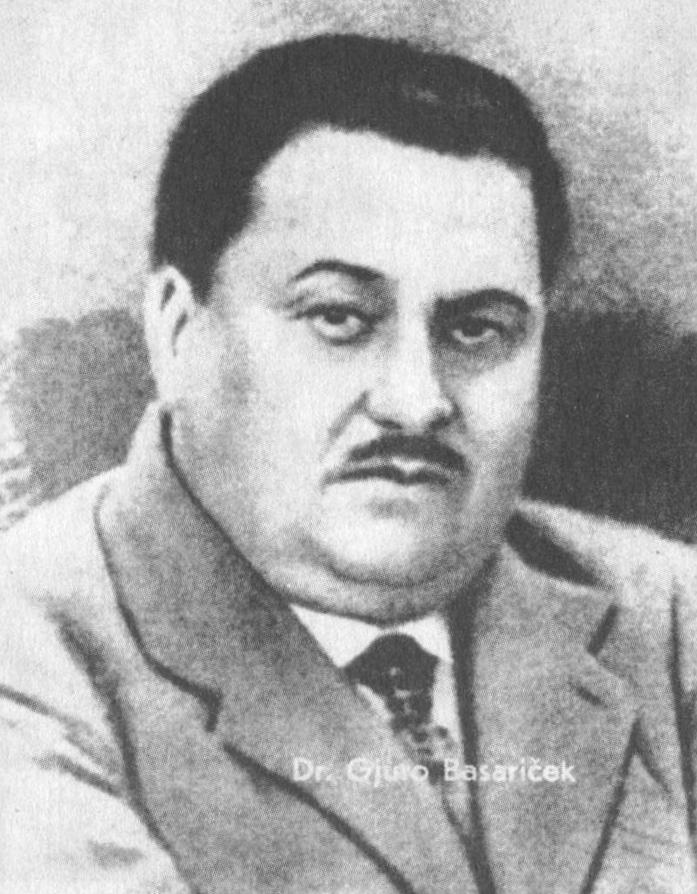

Đuro Basariček (Croatian pronunciation: [d͡ʑǔːro basarǐt͡ʃek]; Zagreb, 13 March 1884 – Belgrade, 20 June 1928) was a Croatian politician, lawyer and social activist. He was a member of the Croatian Peasant Party from its founding in 1904. He was assassinated in the National Assembly of the Kingdom of Serbs, Croats and Slovenes in Belgrade in 1928.

Basariček was the son of Stjepan Basariček and Amalija (née Pogačnik), natives of Đurđevac. He finished elementary school, gymnasium and a law degree in Zagreb where he also received his doctorate in law in 1907. He served as a judge in Slavonski Brod and in Zagreb. He was active in relocating disadvantaged children from Istria and Bosnia and Herzegovina to more fertile areas, largely in Slavonia and Podravina. In 1919, Basariček began his involvement in the colonization of Slavonia from areas such Gorski kotar and Lika, and continued with this cause until his death.

From the founding of the Croatian Peasant Party, Basariček collaborated with its leader Stjepan Radić. Believing as Radić did that the Croats needed to embrace Pan-Slavism, Basariček learned Czech and Russian. He was elected to the National Assembly of the Kingdom of Serbs, Croats and Slovenes four times: in 1920, 1923, 1925 and 1927. In 1927 he addressed the assembly saying that "dark powers" were preparing a dictatorship which was "equally dangerous to the Croats and to Serbdom". On 20 June 1928, Basariček was assassinated by Radical representative Puniša Račić. In the attack Pavle Radić was also killed and Stjepan Radić was fatally wounded. The event led to King Alexander's proclamation of a dictatorship in the Kingdom on 6 January 1929 and the renaming of the country to the Kingdom of Yugoslavia.

== Sources ==
- Basariček, Đuro (in Croatian)
