= Labin Republic =

1921 unrecognised state in modern Croatia

Labin Republic Labinska Republika (Croatian) Repubblica di Albona (Italian)
- 1921
- Flag Emblem
- Motto: Kova je nasa [sic] "The mine is ours"
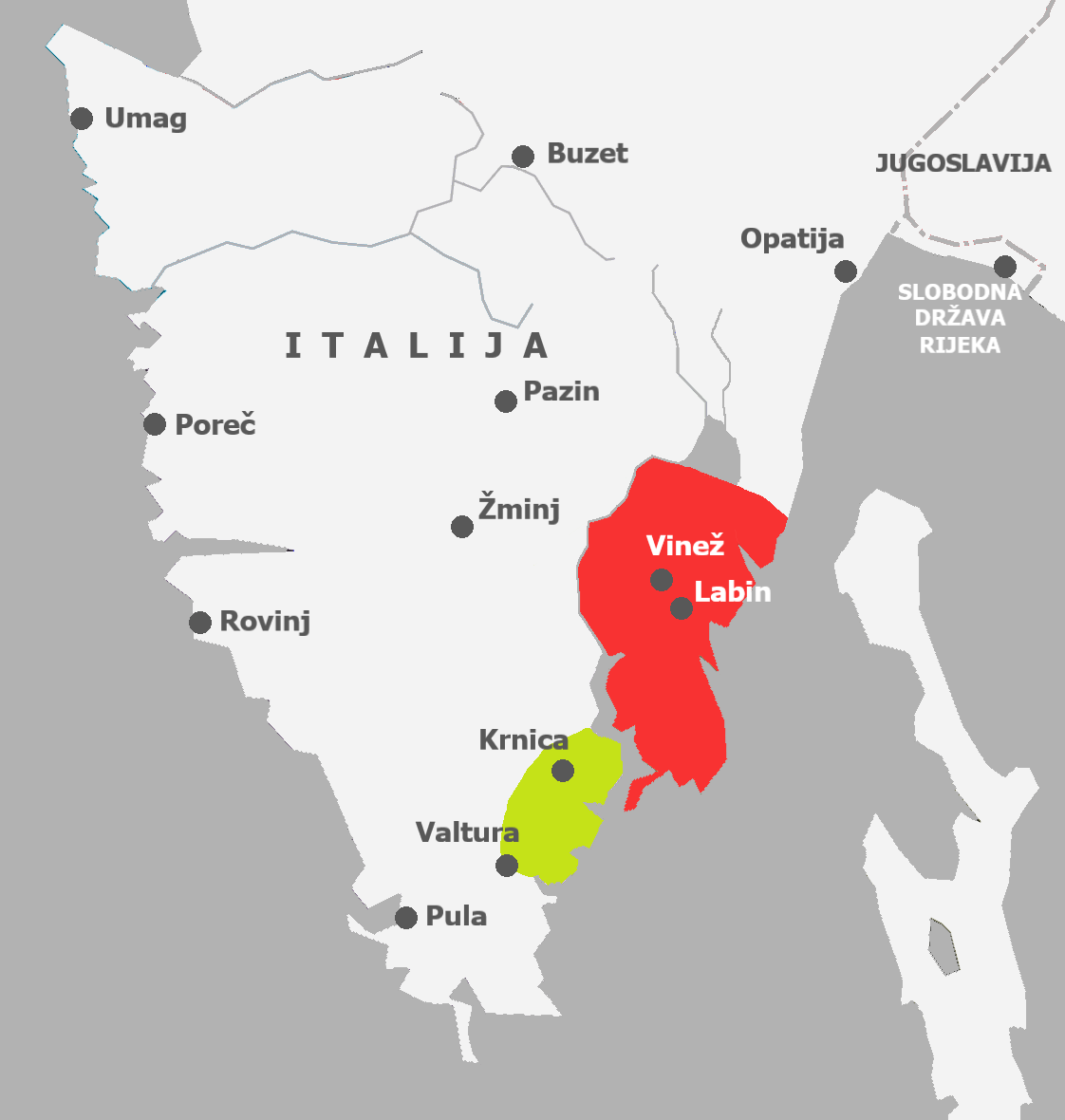
- Labin Republic shown in red, Proština rebellion in green
- Status: Unrecognized state
- Capital: Labin; 45°05′N 14°07′E
- Common languages: Italian, Croatian, and Chakavian
- Government: Socialist republic
  - Head of the miners committee: Giovanni Pippan
  - Commander of the Red Guards: Francesco Da Gioz
- Historical era: Interwar period
  - Established: March 7, 1921
  - Disestablished: April 8, 1921

Area
  - Total: 325 km^{2} (125 sq mi)
- Currency: Italian lira
Preceded by	Succeeded by
Kingdom of Italy (1861–1946)	Kingdom of Italy (1861–1946)
- Today part of: Croatia

The Labin Republic or Albona Republic (Croatian: Labinska republika, Italian: Repubblica di Albona) was a short-lived self-governing republic that was proclaimed by miners in the Istrian city of Labin (Albona) on March 7, 1921, during a mining strike. It was created in what has been described as the world's first anti-fascist uprising. On April 8, the Italian authorities suppressed the strike by force.

== History ==
With the collapse of the Austro-Hungarian Empire following the end of the First World War, Italy proceeded to annex the regions of Gorizia, Trieste, Istria and parts of Dalmatia as part of the Treaty of Saint-Germain, as promised in the Treaty of London by the Triple Entente. Italy began to revitalize and exploit the resources and economic potential of the newly annexed territories.

Before Mussolini's March on Rome in Italy, fascists occupied the headquarters of the Workers' Committee in Trieste in 1921, set it on fire, and attacked representatives of the Raša (Arsa) Mining Trade Union. Prompted by this event and the exploitative character of the mine owners, the Società Anonima Carbonifera Arsa, a general strike of about two thousand miners broke out.

One of the causes of the strike was the decision by the mine owners not to pay a bonus for February 1921, because the miners had taken a day’s holiday to observe Candlemas on 2 February, although the management had abolished it as a holiday. "For the miners the Candlemas was, next to the feast of Santa Barbara, the most important day because February 2 symbolized the light."

The men were of different origins - mostly Italians and Croats, but also Slovenes, Germans, Czechs, Slovaks, Poles and Hungarians. They were led by Giovanni Pippan from Trieste, sent by the regional committee of the Italian Socialist Party, and by Giacomo Macillis and Giulio (Lelio) Zustovich from Labin. However on March 1, 1921, Pippan was caught by a group of fascists at the railway station in Pazin, where he was beaten. The news reached Labin the following day and on 3 March the miners assembled and decided to occupy the mine works in response. Augmented by the arrival of the peasants from the surrounding countryside, a "red guard" was organized as a security force tasked with maintaining order.

The miners proclaimed the republic in the occupied mines on 7 March with the slogan Kova je nasa ("The mine is ours"). They organized a government and the Red Guards as protection from the police, and started to manage the production of mines by themselves with the support of some farmers.

On April 8, 1921 the Italian authorities, responding to requests for intervention from the mine owners, decided to suppress the republic using military force. A thousand soldiers surrounded the mine and eventually succeeded after suppressing the strong resistance of the miners. The arrested miners were sent to prisons in Pola and Rovigno. The indictment charged 52 miners. Lawyers Edmondo Puecher, Guido Zennaro and Egidio Cerlenizza successfully defended the accused, and the jury issued an acquittal.

== Aftermath ==
Although never established, the Labin Republic had left unrecoverable scars on Labinština, and it had a much wider echo. This cluster of events should be interpreted in the context of the circumstances at the time, particularly in the Italian Peninsula and Central Europe. The multi-ethnic, but unique armed resistance to overwhelming fascism paved the way for anti-fascism.

The story of the Labin Republic was the subject of a 1985 Yugoslav film, The Red and the Black (Serbo-Croatian: Crveni i crni).

== See also ==
- Proština rebellion
- Red Guards (Italy)
