= Franjo Nevistić =

Croatian journalist and essayist (1913–1984)

Franjo Nevistić (2 July 1913, Šujica, Tomislavgrad, Bosnia and Herzegovina – 13 June 1984, Buenos Aires, Argentina) was a Croatian journalist and essayist.

== Biography ==
Franjo Nevistić was born in Šujica in 1913. He was born in the family of Ilija and Ruža (Lauš) Nevistić. attended elementary school in his native village and secondary education received a Franciscan Classical Gymnasium in Široki Brijeg. He studied in Zagreb where he graduated in October 1939. he received his PhD on 31 October 1940 at the Faculty of Law in Zagreb.

In 1937, he participated in the murder of an anti-fascist student Krsto Ljubičić. The court in Zagreb sentenced him to strict imprisonment for eight months on June 22 of the same year.

In 1941 and 1942, he was in Rome as secretary of the local mission of the Independent State of Croatia. In exile, he was Secretary domobrana Croatian and Croatian-Argentine Cultural Club. He published a newsletter, Croatia, and edited the magazine Studia croatica, for which he also wrote articles.

== Works ==
- The foundations of democracy - Crisis and reconstruction , Rome, in 1971.
- Grecia y la crisis actual de Yugoslavia , Buenos Aires, 1972.
- Grecia y su destino , Buenos Aires, in 1977.
- For the freedom of man and of the Croatian people: the choice of articles and essays (1938-1984), Barcelona-Munich, in 1989.
- Literary articles in Danica and Croatian Review
