= Lijevo Trebarjevo =

Coordinates: 45°36′N 16°21′E

- Village
- Interactive map of Lijevo Trebarjevo
- Country: Croatia

Area
  - Total: 0.54 sq mi (1.4 km^{2})

Population (2021)
  - Total: 54
  - Density: 100/sq mi (39/km^{2})
- Time zone: UTC+1 (CET)
  - Summer (DST): UTC+2 (CEST)

Lijevo Trebarjevo is a village in Croatia.

Lijevo Trebarjevo has an altitude of 93m and is 15 kilometres (9 mi) near to Sisak.
