= Krnica, Marčana =

Krnica Carnizza
- Village
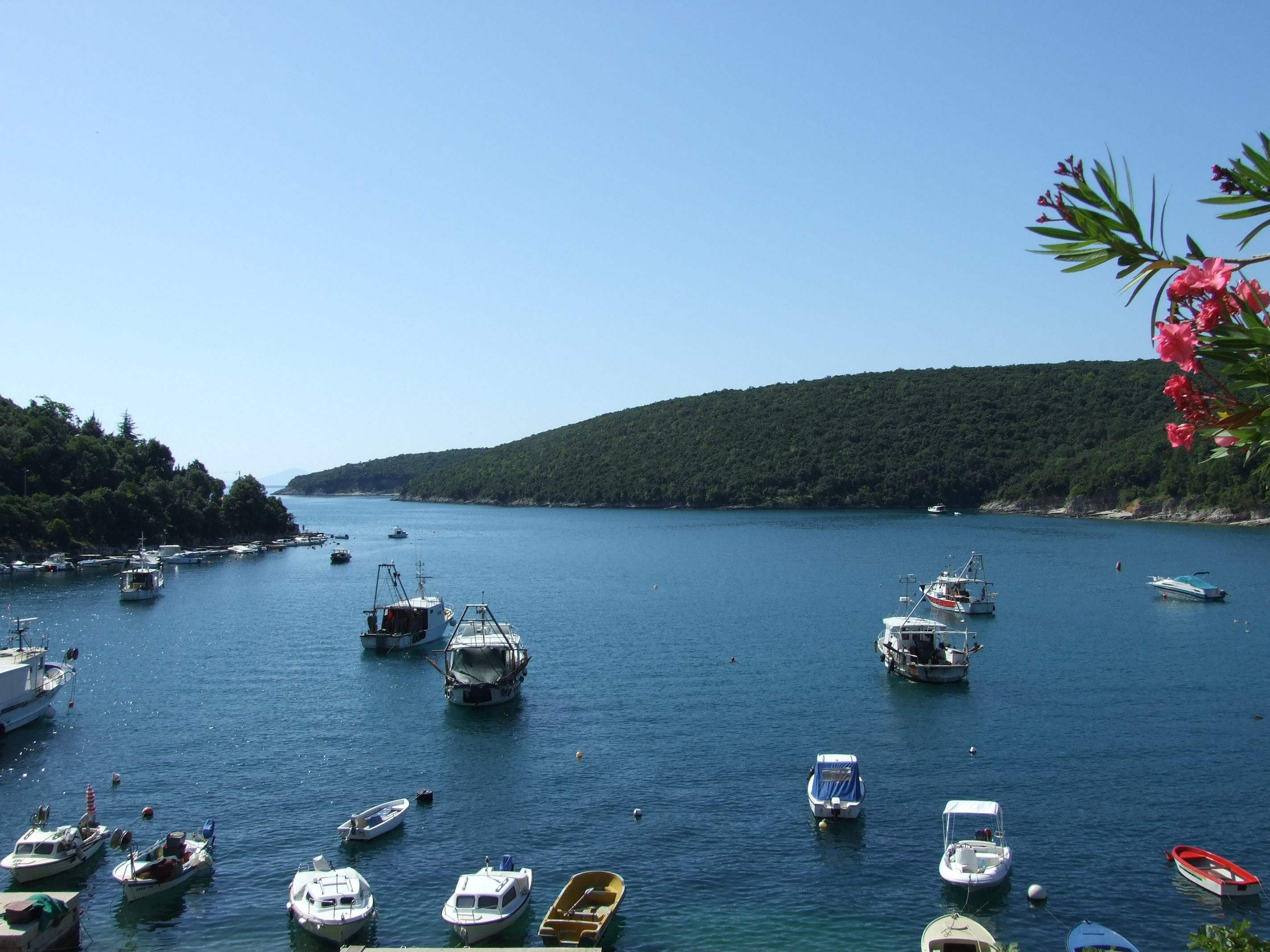

- Location within Croatia
- Coordinates: 44°58′21″N 14°01′02″E
- Country: Croatia
- County: Istria County
- Municipality: Marčana

Area
  - Total: 4.8 sq mi (12.4 km^{2})
- Elevation: 640 ft (195 m)

Population (2021)
  - Total: 275
  - Density: 57.4/sq mi (22.2/km^{2})
- Time zone: UTC+1 (CET)
  - Summer (DST): UTC+2 (CEST)
- Postal code: 52208 Krnica
- Area code: 052

Krnica (Italian: Carnizza) is a village in southeastern Istria, Croatia.

== Geography ==
It is located about 17 km (10.5 mi) northeast of Pula, the largest city in Istria County. Krnica is 195 meters (639 feet) above sea level. 2.3 km (1.4 mi) southeast of Krnica is the port of Krnički porat, a protected area with very few houses.

== Demographics ==
According to the 2021 census, its population was 275.
