= Marčana =

Marčana Marzana
- Municipality
- Marčana Municipality
- Flag

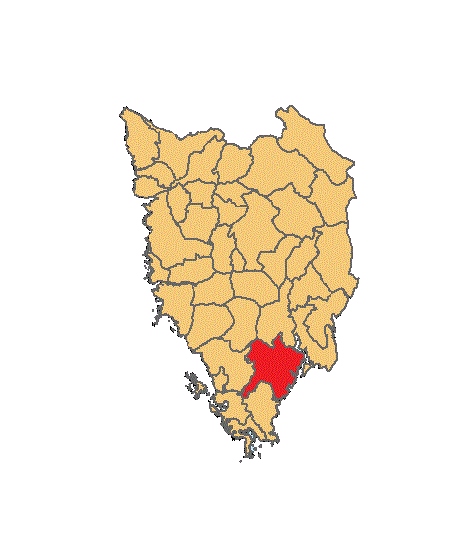
- Location of Marčana municipality in Istria
- Interactive map of Marčana
- Location within Croatia
- Coordinates: 44°57′N 13°57′E
- Country: Croatia
- County: Istria County

Government
  - Mayor: Predrag Pliško

Area
  - Municipality: 131.0 km^{2} (50.6 sq mi)
  - Urban: 22.5 km^{2} (8.7 sq mi)
- Elevation: 170 m (560 ft)

Population (2021)
  - Municipality: 4,250
  - Density: 32.4/km^{2} (84.0/sq mi)
  - Urban: 1,099
  - Urban density: 48.8/km^{2} (127/sq mi)
- Time zone: UTC+1 (CET)
  - Summer (DST): UTC+2 (CEST)
- Website: marcana.hr

Marčana (Italian: Marzana) is a municipality and village in the southern part of Istria, Croatia, 15 km northeast of Pula. The village is situated on the D66 state road (Pula–Rijeka).

== Demographics ==
According to the 2021 census, its population was 4,250, with 1,099 living in the town proper.

The municipality consists of the following settlements:

- Belavići, population 22
- Bratulići, population 40
- Cokuni, population 69
- Divšići, population 162
- Filipana, population 93
- Hreljići, population 71
- Kavran, population 121
- Krnica, population 275
- Kujići, population 69
- Loborika, population 978
- Mali Vareški, population 81
- Marčana, population 1099
- Mutvoran, population 21
- Orbanići, population 141
- Pavićini, population 79
- Peruški, population 215
- Pinezići, population 40
- Prodol, population 86
- Rakalj, population 393
- Šarići, population 93
- Šegotići, population 86
- Veliki Vareški, population 16
Marčana: Population trends 1857–2021
v

population	3076	3785	4086	4504	4608	5257	5400	6075	5898	5517	5053	4340	3962	3729	3903	4253	4250
	1857	1869	1880	1890	1900	1910	1921	1931	1948	1953	1961	1971	1981	1991	2001	2011	2021

Sources: Croatian Bureau of Statistics publications
