= Provisional Government of the Democratic Federal Yugoslavia =

Yugoslavian Provisional Government in 1945

- 1st Cabinet of Democratic Federal Yugoslavia

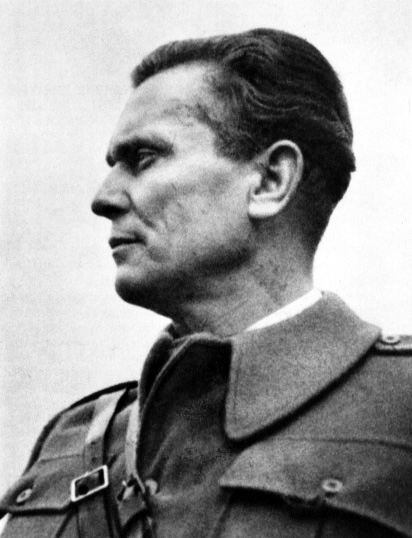
- Date formed: 7 March 1945
- Date dissolved: 29 November 1945

People and organisations
- Head of state: King Peter II
- Head of government: Josip Broz Tito
- Status in legislature: Provisional Government

History
- Predecessor: (Kingdom of Yugoslavia) Government-in-exile (Democratic Federal Yugoslavia) NKOJ
- Successor: (Democratic Federal Yugoslavia) Federal People's Republic of Yugoslavia

Emblem of the Temporary Government of the Democratic Federal Yugoslavia

The Provisional Government of the Democratic Federal Yugoslavia (Serbo-Croatian: Privremena vlada Demokratske Federativne Jugoslavije / Привремена влада Демократске Федеративне Југославије) was Democratic Federal Yugoslavia's temporary national government formed through the merger of the Yugoslav government-in-exile and the National Committee for the Liberation of Yugoslavia (NKOJ). It existed from 7 March to 11 November 1945. It then became the Federal People's Republic of Yugoslavia in late 1945, which in turn became the Socialist Federal Republic of Yugoslavia from 1963 to 1992.

== History ==
"At the moment these are our efforts are focused in one direction, and that is:

1. to bring together all patriotic and honorable individuals to our fight against the invaders was as successful as possible,
2. build the nations Yugoslav brotherhood and unity that did not exist before the war and for whose absence brought our country to disaster
3. provide conditions for the organization of a state in which all the nations feel happy, and it is truly a Democratic Federal Yugoslavia."

== Emergence ==
Before the temporary government was formed, there were several meetings between Tito and Ivan Šubašić, the pre-war Ban of Croatia and Prime Minister of Yugoslavia in London during the Second World War.

The international situation has affected Tito to enter politics and compromise to replace radicalism, the pressure of Great Britain and its international protector USSR, "real politics" and to adopt a memorandum of the British government, which was transmitted to him by Winston Churchill of August 1944. To the country will not impose communism, to keep the Communist Party in the conspiracy, and to express the communist program through the National Front of Yugoslavia.

After the Treaty of Vis or the Tito–Šubašić Agreement, Tito and Šubašić met in Vršac on 20 October 1944. Tito's stay in the Soviet Union during the Moscow Conference between Joseph Stalin and Winston Churchill opened the door for other agreements between representatives of the National Committee and the Royal Government. The agreement was concluded on 1 November 1944 in Belgrade and is known as the Belgrade Agreement.

To new contacts occurred in December 1944, when the amendment was made to the Belgrade Agreement, certain guarantees for the political parties, and the ratification of legislation AVNOJ by the future Constituent Assembly. The Belgrade Agreement has been dissatisfied with King Peter II, whose function under the agreement of Tito–Šubašić in 1944. A Regency Council performed by a panel composed of three members.

However, after the Yalta Conference on 16 February 1945, Ivan Šubašić's government arrived in Belgrade. After much negotiation and persuasion, King Peter II finally agreed to power transition. Under the agreement, three days later, the royal government and the NKOJ resigned. The new government was formed on 7 March 1945, and on 9 March adopted a Declaration. That night Tito read it in a broadcast over Radio Belgrade.

== Abdication of King Peter II ==
Acting as Head of state on 7 March 1945, King Peter II created his Regency Council to which he appointed constitutional lawyers Srđan Budisavljević, Ante Mandić, and Dušan Sernec. In doing so, the King empowered his Council to form a common temporary government with the National Committee for the Liberation of Yugoslavia (NKOJ) and accept Josip Broz Tito's nomination as Prime Minister of the first normal government of post-war Yugoslavia. As authorized by the King, the council has thus accepted the Tito's nomination on 29 November 1945, when Federal People's Republic of Yugoslavia or Second Yugoslavia was officially declared. By this unconditional transfer of powers, Peter II has abdicated to Tito. This date, when the second Yugoslavia was born under international law, had since been marked as Yugoslavia's national holiday Day of the Republic, however following the communists' switch to authoritarianism, this holiday officially marked the 1943 Session of AVNOJ that coincidentally fell on the same day of the year.

Milan Grol the Deputy Prime Minister resigned on 8 August 1945, on the grounds that the new government did not respect the principle of democracy and freedom of speech. After the "burning house" editorial of Democracy was published in the towns of Yugoslavia, there was a disagreement between Šubašić and a representative of the Unitary National Liberation Front. On the same day, Juraj Šutej, Minister without portfolio, resigned. Ivan Šubašić, the Minister of Foreign Affairs, resigned on 8 October 1945, saying there was no free democratic government but a communist dictatorship in the country.

== Members of the cabinet ==
Minister		Portfolio	Term	Party	Notes
Josip Broz Tito	Josip Broz Tito	Prime Minister; Minister of Defence	7 March 1945 –	Unitary National Liberation Front	Previously head of the NKOJ.
Milan Grol	Milan Grol	Deputy Prime Minister	7 March – 24 August 1945	Democratic Party	Previously member of the government-in-exile. Resigned on 18 August 1945
Edvard Kardelj	Edvard Kardelj	Deputy Prime Minister	7 March 1945 –	Unitary National Liberation Front	Previously member of the NKOJ.
Ivan Šubašić	Ivan Šubašić	Minister of Foreign Affairs	7 March – 8 October 1945	Croatian Peasant Party	Previously head of the government-in-exile. Resigned on 8 October 1945
Josip Smodlaka	Josip Smodlaka	Minister without Portfolio	7 March 1945 –	Unitary National Liberation Front	Previously member of the NKOJ.
Juraj Šutej	Juraj Šutej	Minister without Portfolio	7 March 1945 –	Croatian Peasant Party	Previously member of the government-in-exile. Resigned on 18 August 1945
Sreten Žujović	Sreten Žujović	Minister of Finances	7 March 1945 –	Unitary National Liberation Front	Previously member of the NKOJ.
Drago Marušič	Drago Marušič	Minister of Post, Telegraph and Telephone	7 March 1945 –	Slovene People's Party	previously member of the government-in-exile.
Frane Frol	Frane Frol	Minister of Justice	7 March 1945 –	Unitary National Liberation Front	Previously member of the NKOJ.
Vlada Zečević	Vlada Zečević	Minister of Internal Affairs	7 March 1945 –	Unitary National Liberation Front	Previously member of the NKOJ.
Todor Vujasinović	Todor Vujasinović	Minister of Transport	7 March 1945 –	Unitary National Liberation Front	Previously member of the NKOJ.
Andrija Hebrang	Andrija Hebrang	Minister of Industry	7 March 1945 –	Unitary National Liberation Front	Previously member of the NKOJ.
Nikola Petrović	Nikola Petrović	Minister of Trade and Supply	7 March 1945 –	Unitary National Liberation Front	Previously member of the NKOJ.
Vladislav Ribnikar	Vladislav S. Ribnikar	Minister of Education	7 March 1945 –	Unitary National Liberation Front	Previously member of the NKOJ.
Sava Kosanović	Sava Kosanović	Minister of Information	7 March 1945 –		previously member of the government-in-exile.
Zlatan Sremec	Zlatan Sremec	Minister of Public Health	7 March 1945 –		Previously member of the NKOJ.
Bane Andrejev	Bane Andreev	Minister of Mining	7 March 1945 –	Unitary National Liberation Front	
Vaso Čubrilović	Vaso Čubrilović	Minister of Agriculture	7 March 1945 –	Unitary National Liberation Front	
Sulejman Filipović	Sulejman Filipović	Minister of Forestry	7 March 1945 –	Unitary National Liberation Front	Previously member of the NKOJ.
Anton Kržišnik	Anton Kržišnik	Minister of Social Affairs	7 March 1945 –	Unitary National Liberation Front	Previously member of the NKOJ.
Sreten Vukosavljević	Sreten Vukosavljević	Minister of Colonization	7 March 1945 –	Unitary National Liberation Front	
Rade Pribićević	Rade Pribićević	Minister of Construction	7 March – 24 April 1945	Unitary National Liberation Front	Previously member of the NKOJ.
Rade Pribićević	Stevan Zečević	Minister of Construction	24 April 1945 –	Unitary National Liberation Front	
Jaša Prodanović	Jaša Prodanović	Minister for Serbia	7 March – 9 April 1945	Unitary National Liberation Front	
	Pavle Gregorić	Minister for Croatia	7 March – 14 April 1945	Unitary National Liberation Front	
Rodoljub Čolaković	Rodoljub Čolaković	Minister for Bosnia and Herzegovina	7 March 1945 –	Unitary National Liberation Front	
Milovan Đilas	Milovan Đilas	Minister for Montenegro	7 March 1945 –	Unitary National Liberation Front	
Emanuel Čučkov	Emanuel Čučkov	Minister for Macedonia	7 March 1945 –	Unitary National Liberation Front	Previously member of the NKOJ.
Edvard Kocbek	Edvard Kocbek	Minister for Slovenia	7 March 1945 –	Unitary National Liberation Front	Previously member of the NKOJ.
