= Milivoj Jambrišak =

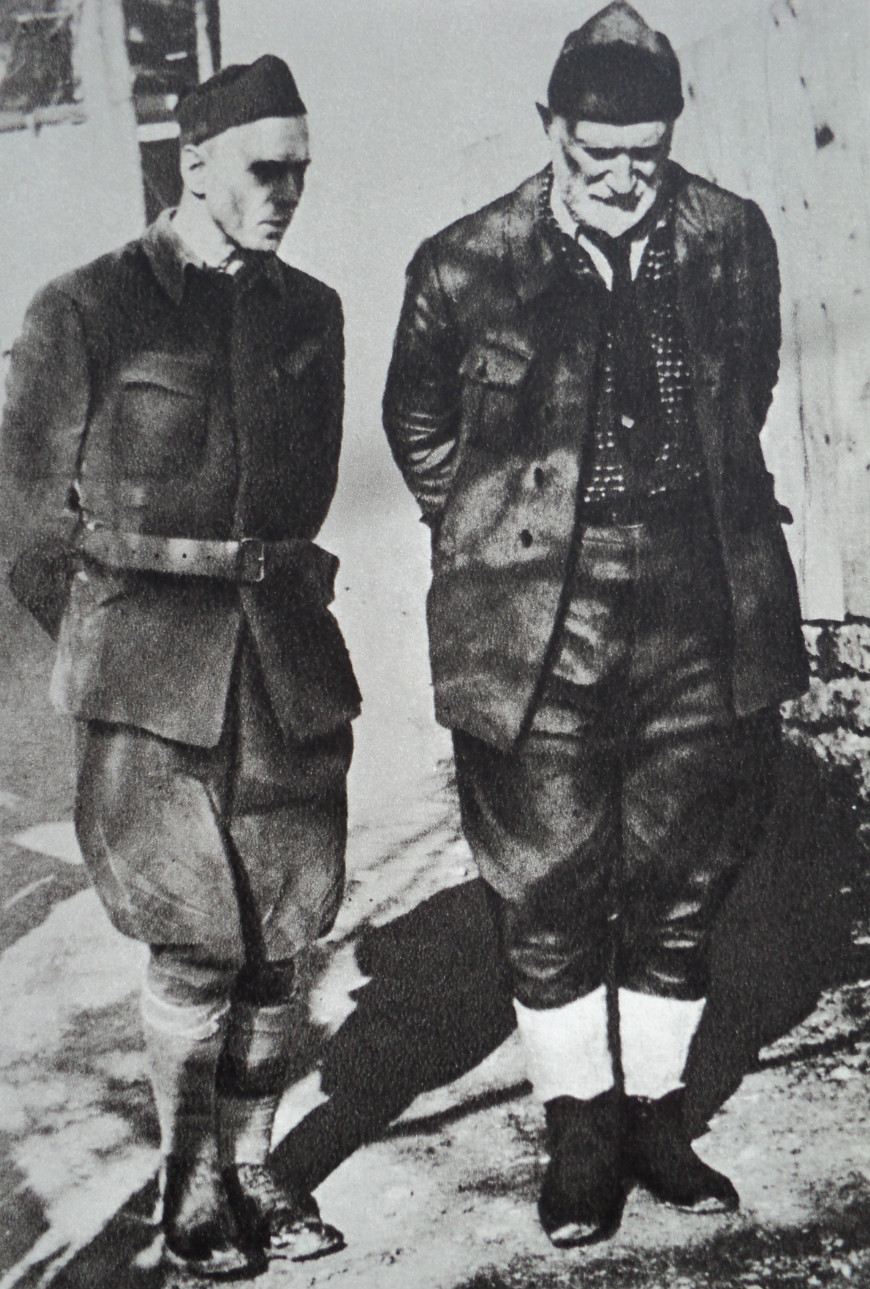
- Milivoj Jambrišak (viewers' right) with Pavle Gregorić in 1943
- Born: 15 June 1878; Zagreb, Croatia-Slavonia, Austria-Hungary (now Croatia)
- Died: 10 December 1943 (aged 65); Vitovlje, Independent State of Croatia (now Bosnia and Herzegovina)
- Education: University of Innsbruck; University of Graz
- Occupations: Physician, politician

Milivoj Jambrišak (15 June 1878 – 10 December 1943) was a Croatian physician and politician.

Jambrišak studied medicine at the University of Innsbruck and the University of Graz, graduating in 1903. In 19..10, he enrolled into the University of Zagreb in his native city, to study law. He dropped out of the law school two years later in 1912, and moved to Belgrade, Serbia to work as a volunteer physician during the Balkan Wars. At the outbreak of the World War I, Jambrišak was conscripted into armed forces of Austria-Hungary in Zagreb and deployed to Galicia at the Eastern Front.

Jambrišak was taken prisoner-of-war by the Imperial Russian Army in 1916 and taken to Odesa where he joined the First Serbian Volunteer Division. In 1917, he became a member of the Yugoslav Committee, an ad-hoc body promoting political unification of the South Slavs and representing the South Slavs living in Austria-Hungary. Until the end of the war, he remained in Odesa and in Saint Petersburg as a Yugoslav Committee representative. In that period, he met Ante Mandić, a Yugoslav Committee representative in Saint Petersburg since 1915. After the war, Jambrišak moved to Belgrade, in the newly established Kingdom of Serbs, Croats and Slovenes (subsequently renamed Yugoslavia). During that period, in 1937, Mandić fled Opatija where he lived with his family, to escape political persecution, and moved in with Jambrišak in Belgrade.

After the 1941 Axis forces Invasion of Yugoslavia, Jambrišak moved to Opatija where he stayed until September 1943 Italian surrender and the Armistice of Cassibile. He then moved to the Yugoslav Partisan-held territory (together with Mandić) joining the Communist Party of Yugoslavia-led armed resistance against the Axis occupation during the World War II in Yugoslavia. At the October 1943 session of the State Anti-Fascist Council for the National Liberation of Croatia (ZAVNOH) held in Plaški, Jambrišak was elected a member of ZAVNOH presidency and a representative of Croatia at the upcoming second session of the Anti-Fascist Council for the National Liberation of Yugoslavia (AVNOJ) in Jajce. The AVNOJ elected Jambrišak a member of the National Committee for the Liberation of Yugoslavia as the people's commissioner for health. Jambrišak died of typhoid fever while traveling from Jajce back to Croatia, near the village of Vitovlje at the Vlašić Mountain. Jambrišak was buried at the Vlašić Mountain, and a monument to him was erected at the site upon wish of the Yugoslav Partisans leader Josip Broz Tito.
