= Committee of National Liberation =

Committee of National Liberation can refer to various World War II national resistance movements:

- French Committee of National Liberation, London-based French government-in-exile established on 3 June 1943
- Italian Committee of National Liberation, political umbrella organization established on 9 September 1943
- Polish Committee of National Liberation, governing authority established on 22 July 1944 by the Soviet-backed Polish communists, in opposition to the London-based Polish government-in-exile
- Yugoslav Committee of National Liberation, governing authority established on 29 November 1943 by the Yugoslav communists, in opposition to the London-based Yugoslav government-in-exile
