= State Anti-Fascist Council for the National Liberation of Croatia =

World War II-era political body established in Croatia, Yugoslavia

State Anti-Fascist Council for the National Liberation of Croatia (ZAVNOH) Zemaljsko antifašističko vijeće narodnog oslobođenja Hrvatske

Type
- Type: Unicameral

History
- Founded: 13 June 1943
- Disbanded: 25 July 1945
- Succeeded by: People's Sabor of Croatia

Leadership
- President: Vladimir Nazor
- Seats: 112 (1943); 166 (1944)

The State Anti-Fascist Council for the National Liberation of Croatia (Zemaljsko antifašističko vijeće narodnog oslobođenja Hrvatske), commonly abbreviated ZAVNOH, was first convened on 13–14 June 1943 in Otočac and Plitvice as the chief political representative body in World War II Axis-occupied Croatia (part of Yugoslavia at the time). It was dominated by the Communist Party of Croatia, a nominally-independent political party active in the territory largely corresponding to present-day Croatia. Despite its nominal independence, the party was a de facto branch of the Josip Broz Tito-led Communist Party of Yugoslavia. ZAVNOH also included representatives or former members of peasant organisations, trade unions, the Croatian Peasant Party, and the Independent Democratic Party.

In addition to performing day-to-day regulatory and government tasks in the territory held by Yugoslav Partisans within Croatia under the leadership of Andrija Hebrang, ZAVNOH sought to broaden the appeal of partisan resistance to the Croatian population by presenting it as not entirely communist. It also tried to reconcile Croat and Serb equality with the promotion of Croatia's interests, sometimes marginalising the Serbs and triggering conflict with Tito. At its third session, in Topusko, ZAVNOH upheld the decisions on federal post-war Yugoslavia adopted by the Anti-Fascist Council for the National Liberation of Yugoslavia. In 1945, ZAVNOH was renamed the People's Sabor of Croatia.

Its work, ideas and decisions contributed to the leadership programme of the League of Communists of Croatia, culminating in the 1971 Croatian Spring. ZAVNOH's decisions were then used to justify newly introduced policies seeking to reform the Yugoslav federation and promote Croatian interests. The 1990 Constitution of Croatia, adopted shortly before the declaration of Croatian independence, cites ZAVNOH in its preamble as a foundation of Croatian statehood.

== Background ==
=== Axis invasion of Yugoslavia ===
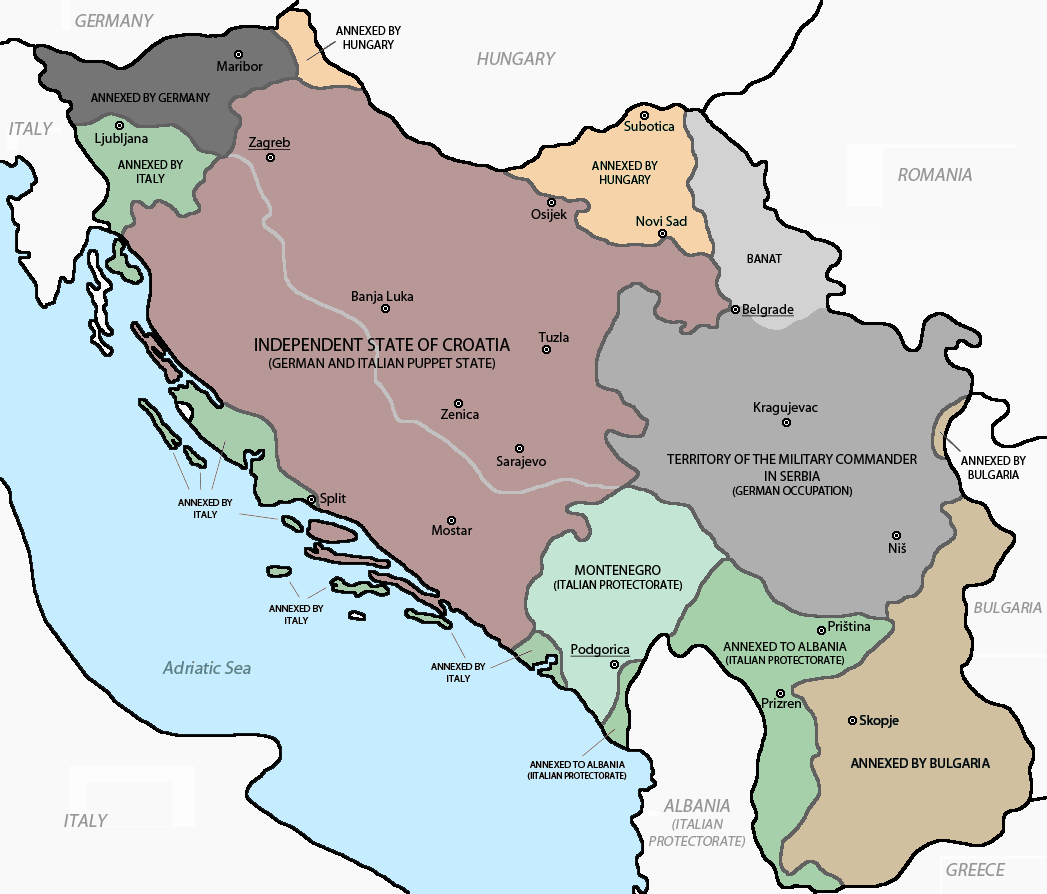
Yugoslavia was occupied and partitioned by the Axis powers in April 1941.

Seeking retribution for their withdrawal from the Tripartite Pact after the March 1941 Yugoslav coup d'état, Adolf Hitler sought to destroy the Kingdom of Yugoslavia by dismembering it for annexation by Nazi Germany and its allies. The move was supported by Italian leader Benito Mussolini, who believed that it would help Fascist Italy expand their territory by absorbing former Yugoslav territories. German plans for the breakup of Yugoslavia also envisaged some form of autonomy for the Croats, exploiting Croatian dissatisfaction with the Yugoslav regime. Hitler offered Hungary the opportunity to absorb Croatia on 27 March 1941 (apparently referring to the territories largely corresponding to the former Kingdom of Croatia-Slavonia), but Regent Miklós Horthy declined his offer. Only days later, Germany determined to establish a Croatian puppet state.

The Nazis turned to the Croatian Peasant Party (Hrvatska seljačka stranka, HSS), the most popular Croatian political party at the time, to set up the state. They offered party leader Vladko Maček the opportunity to govern it, but Maček declined. Its rule was then reluctantly offered to the Italian-based Ustaše and their leader, Ante Pavelić. Mussolini sought to capitalise on the promises made in a 1927 memorandum submitted by Pavelić and Ivo Frank, promising territorial concessions to Italy. The Independent State of Croatia (Nezavisna Država Hrvatska, NDH) was declared on 10 April, as the Wehrmacht was approaching Zagreb. The declaration was made by Slavko Kvaternik at the urging of, and with support from, SS Colonel Edmund Veesenmayer of the Dienststelle Ribbentrop. Pavelić and the Ustaše were only permitted to leave Italy and Italian-occupied territory in Yugoslavia after Mussolini extracted a written confirmation of the 1927 pledge, allowing him to reach Zagreb in the early morning of 15 April with 195 Ustašas. Yugoslavia surrendered shortly thereafter, on 17 April 1941, with King Peter II and the government fleeing the country. The decision to abandon armed resistance to the Axis powers so early placed the Yugoslav government-in-exile in a poor position, further weakened by quarreling ministers who appeared united only in their opposition to communism.

=== Partisan resistance ===
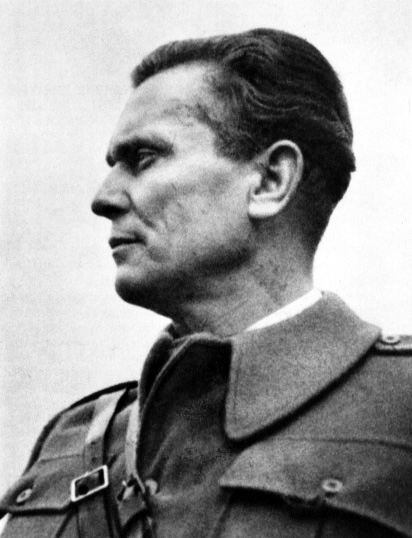
Josip Broz Tito led the Partisans against Axis forces in Yugoslavia.

With defeat imminent, the Communist Party of Yugoslavia (Komunistička partija Jugoslavije, KPJ) instructed its 8,000 members to stockpile weapons in anticipation of armed resistance (which spread throughout the country, except for Macedonia, by the end of 1941). Building on its experience in nationwide clandestine operation, the KPJ organised the Partisans into a resistance force led by Josip Broz Tito. The KPJ concluded that the German invasion of the Soviet Union had created favourable conditions for an uprising, and its politburo established the Supreme Headquarters of the National Liberation Army of Yugoslavia (Narodonooslobodilačka vojska Jugoslavije, with Tito its commander-in-chief) on 27 June 1941. In the territory largely corresponding to present-day Croatia, the Communist Party of Croatia (Komunistička partija Hrvatske, KPH) operated as a nominally-independent party but was a de facto KPJ branch; at the beginning of the war, it had 4,000 members.

The Serb population living in the NDH was eager to join the Partisan struggle, due to their severe persecution by the Ustaše regime. The KPJ competed for Serb loyalty with the Chetniks: nationalist Serb guerrillas who fought the Partisans and the NDH, backed by Fascist Italy and organised as the Anti-Communist Volunteer Militia. A major contributor to Croat Partisan recruitment was the transfer of a large portion of the Adriatic coast to Italy through the Treaties of Rome as fulfilment of Pavelić's promise to Mussolini. By late 1943, Croatia's contribution to the Yugoslav Partisan resistance was disproportionately large: 38 of its 97 brigades.

=== Establishment of the AVNOJ ===
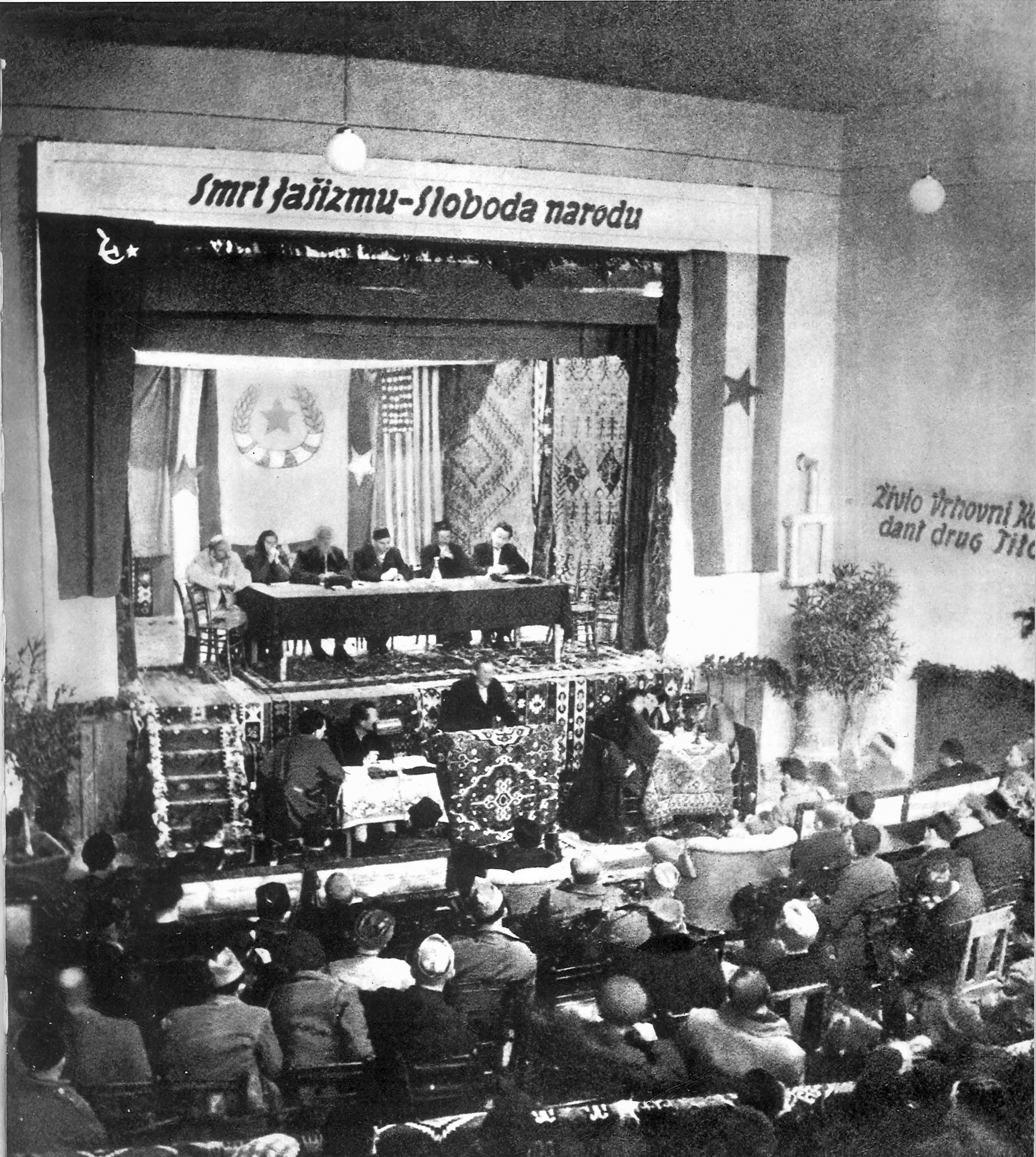
First session of the AVNOJ

In November 1942, the Partisans captured the town of Bihać and secured a large part of western Bosnia, Dalmatia and Lika. On 26 and 27 November, the pan-Yugoslav Anti-Fascist Council for the National Liberation of Yugoslavia (Antifašističko vijeće narodnog oslobođenja Jugoslavije, AVNOJ) was established in Bihać at the urging of Tito and the KPJ. At its first session, the AVNOJ adopted a multi-ethnic federal state as the basis for the country's future government but did not determine the post-war system of government. The number of future federal units and their equality were ambiguous.

The AVNOJ elected Ivan Ribar president; Ribar, the first president of the Constitutional Assembly of the Kingdom of Serbs, Croats and Slovenes (later renamed Yugoslavia), symbolised continuity with the pre-war government. The 1942 AVNOJ-established bodies were not formally considered a government, and Tito said that international relations precluded the formation of a government at that point; he described AVNOJ as a political instrument designed to mobilise. Despite ambiguity about the number and equality of future federal units, the AVNOJ urged the convening of similar assemblies in future federal units.

== Sessions ==
=== First session ===
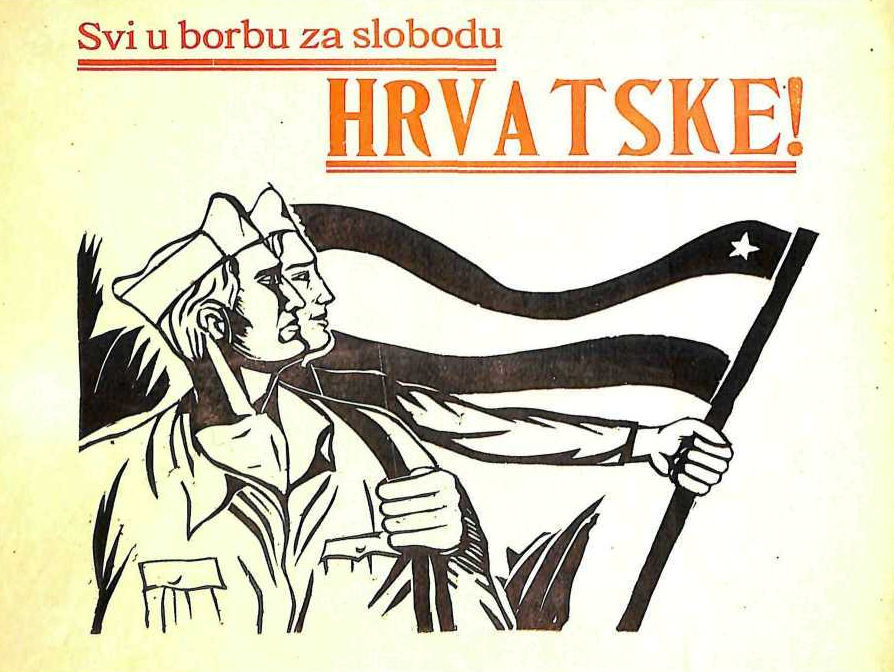
Partisan poster reading (in English) "For the freedom of Croatia"

During the first session of the AVNOJ, Tito tasked KPH central committee member Pavle Gregorić with setting up a supreme political body of the national liberation movement in Croatia as soon as possible. A working group – AVNOJ Delegates from Croatia (Vijećnici AVNOJ-a iz Hrvatske) – was set up in Slunj in early December 1942, and the State Anti-Fascist Council for the National Liberation of Croatia (Zemaljsko antifašističko vijeće narodnog oslobođenja Hrvatske, ZAVNOH) was expected to convene in mid-January 1943. However, the Axis Case White offensive forced the plans to be postponed. The eight-member Initiative Committee of the ZAVNOH (Inicijativni odbor ZAVNOH-a) was instead convened in the village of Ponori, near Korenica. The Initiative Committee was headed by three-member secretariat consisting of Gregorić, Stanko Ćanica-Opačić, and Šime Balen. Balen, a former HSS member who was persuaded to join the KPJ by KPH central-committee secretary Andrija Hebrang, later headed the ZAVNOH propaganda department. Another former HSS activist, Nikola Rubčić, was brought in as the editor of Vjesnik (the ZAVNOH's official newspaper).

On 17 March 1943, the committee declared that it was assuming all popular authority in Croatia until the ZAVNOH was convened. A 26 May declaration emphasised that the national liberation movement in Croatia was part of the Yugoslav national liberation movement; Croats and Serbs would independently decide on internal matters and relations with other peoples after the country's liberation.

After the successful spring 1943 offensive and recapture of most of the Banija, Kordun, and Lika regions by the 1st Corps, the ZAVNOH first convened in Otočac and Plitvice as Croatia's supreme representative political body on 13–14 June. The session consisted of 112 members, with an eleven-member executive committee led by president Vladimir Nazor and three vice-presidents. It adopted the Plivice Resolution, detailing the history of the Croatian people and their struggle for freedom, the backward nature of the Kingdom of Yugoslavia, the reign of terror of the NDH and the Chetniks, and the betrayal of the royal government in exile. The resolution called for the recovery of Croatian lands seized by foreigners and "full and true democratic freedom and equality of Croats and Serbs".

The first ZAVNOH session recognised a "free Bosnia and Herzegovina", relinquishing control of Livno. In return, it received Dvor and the coast between the Neretva River and the Bay of Kotor originally assigned to the Bosnian or Herzegovinan Partisans.

=== Second session ===
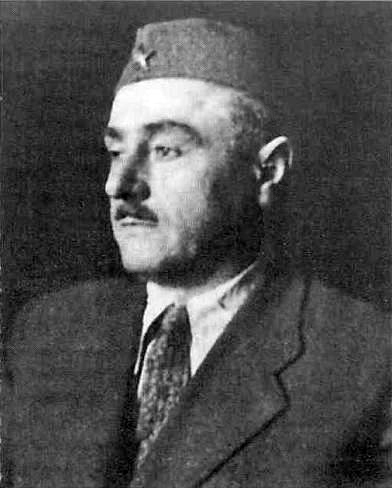
As secretary of the KPH central committee, Andrija Hebrang had a significant influence on the ZAVNOH's work.

Between the ZAVNOH's first and the second sessions, the national liberation movement in Croatia grew from 25,000 to 100,000 fighters and increased its control – particularly on the coast, after the surrender of Italy. On 20 September 1943, the ZAVNOH executive committee decided to add Istria, Rijeka, Zadar and other Croatian lands previously annexed by Italy to Croatia (and thus to Yugoslavia). The AVNOJ confirmed the decision on 30 September. Tito criticised the ZAVNOH for assuming sovereignty in place of Yugoslavia, seeing the decision as an example of latent nationalism in the KPH leadership (which controlled about fifty percent of the Yugoslav Partisan forces at the time).

The ZAVNOH's second session was held in Plaški from 12 to 15 October 1943. It expanded by 66 members, largely drawn from the HSS. The HSS splintered early in the war. Vladko Maček led the party's most influential faction, adopting a policy of waiting for liberation by the Allies. Another group, which included former Ban of Croatia Ivan Šubašić, fled the country to join the royal government in exile. A third group joined the Ustaše; a fourth group, led by Božidar Magovac (organised as the HSS executive committee), joined the KPH-dominated national liberation movement. Magovac saw his HSS faction and the KPH as a coalition of equals. Although some Partisan fighters resented the acceptance of HSS members, the official KPH position was that the newcomers were welcome and free to maintain their political views. This position was taken in the (accurate) belief that a greater involvement of HSS members would lead to broader Croat participation in the Partisan struggle. A group of Independent Democratic Party (Samostalna demokratska stranka, SDS) leaders also agreed to cooperate with the movement. Peasant organisations and trade unions sent representatives to the ZAVNOH, which sought to represent as broad a segment of the population as possible. Participation of the organisations depended on their acceptance of the KPH's lead.

The second session appointed a 15-member executive committee (led by a president and three vice-presidents) to discharge political functions, and a six-member secretariat selected from the executive committee members as a de facto Croatian government to perform day-to-day tasks. The secretariat retained its function until the People's Government was appointed in Split on 14 April 1945.

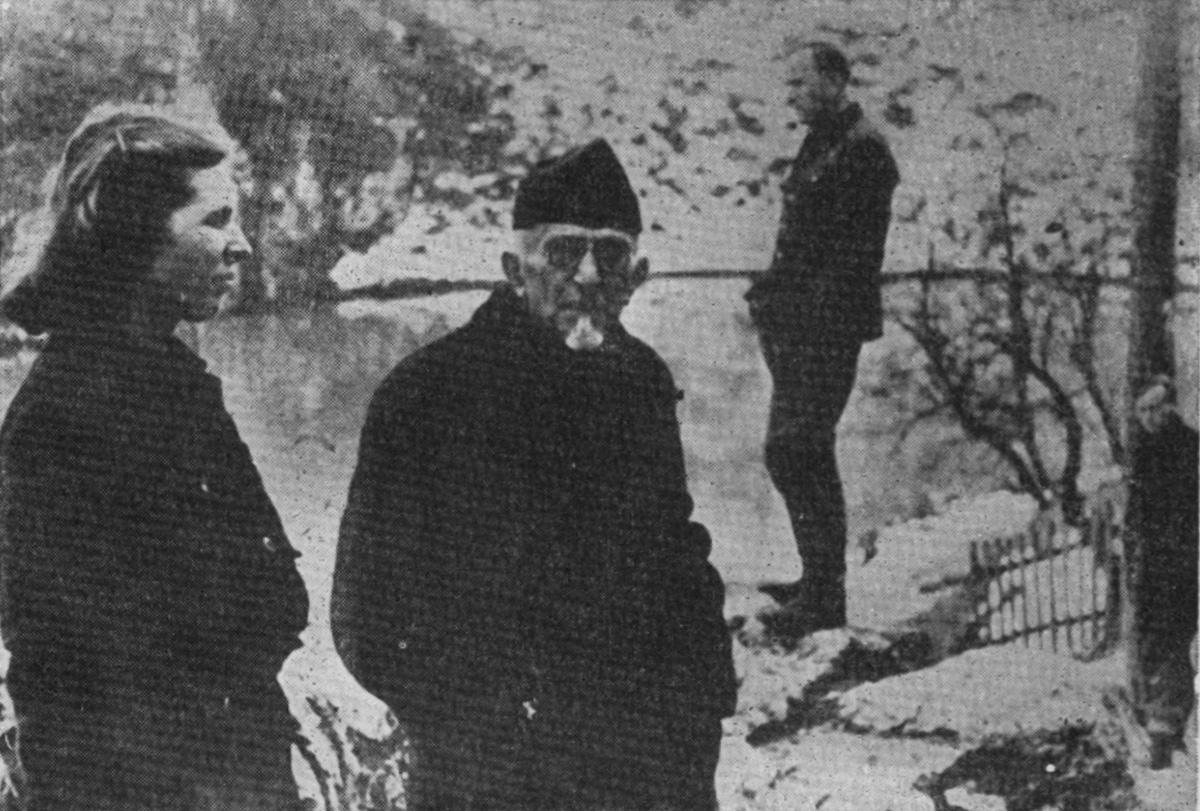
Poet Vladimir Nazor presided over the ZAVNOH sessions.

In his speech to the second session, Hebrang urged the KPH to accept the popular "mass movement" instead of pursuing a leftist agenda. He urged the party to ensure that the Partisan struggle was not perceived as exclusively communist, condemning "fanatics flying only the red flag" and extremism in the KPJ. The ZAVNOH replied that it did not intend to radically change social life, and recognised the status of private property.

On 12 January 1944, the Serbian Club of ZAVNOH Members was established in Otočac. It was chaired by Rade Pribičević, a member of the pre-war SDS' Main Committee. Despite Pribičević's assertion that Croatian Serbs would pursue Croatia's interests in Yugoslavia, there was some resentment of their actual, perceived or expected position. The principal complaints were that the Serbs were marginalised in Croatia, Ustaše atrocities were overlooked, Serbs were underrepresented in the ZAVNOH, and their Cyrillic script was discouraged. Although Hebrang insisted on teaching the Cyrillic script in all schools, he also said that Croatia Serbs had to accept their a minority status (albeit with equal rights) in a Croatian state. Hebrang's efforts to emphasise Croat contribution to the Partisan struggle contributed to perceived Croatian Serb marginalisation. As a result of this (and Chetnik propaganda), four ethnic-Serb Partisan commanders and about 90 subordinates defected to Germany in the Kordun region in 1944. Hebrang's policies also increased KPJ leadership concern about his effects on Serb Partisan support.

=== Third session ===
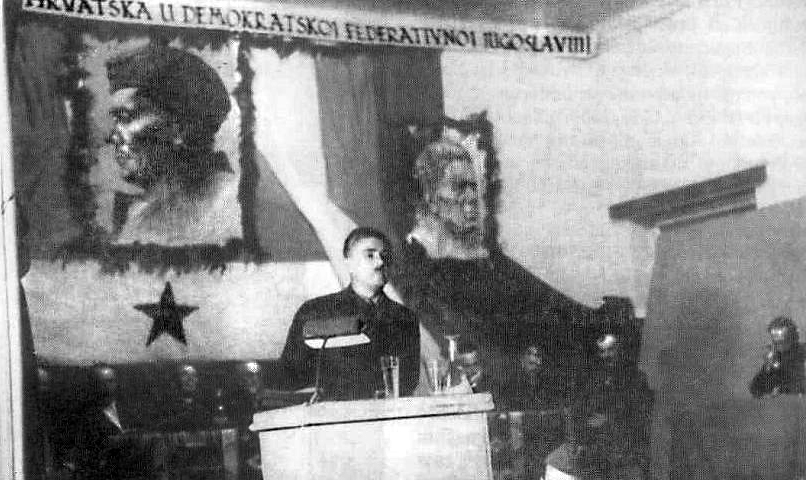
Andrija Hebrang speaking at the third session.

Emblem of the Federal State of Croatia, used on 1943 National Liberation Bonds issued by the ZAVNOH.

The AVNOJ's decision on the self-determination of all Yugoslav nations was meant to be confirmed by representative bodies of all future federal units. The ZAVNOH met for this purpose on 8–9 May 1944 in Topusko. The session convened in a spa restaurant in the evening, and concluded the next morning to minimise exposure to potential air assault. One hundred five of 166 delegates attended, along with AVNOJ president Ivan Ribar and vice-presidents Moša Pijade, Marko Vujačić and Josip Rus, and Ivan Milutinović as a non-Croatian member of the National Committee for the Liberation of Yugoslavia. The Partisan forces in Croatia were represented by the 4th Corps (previously designated as the 1st Corps) commander and commissar, Generals Ivan Gošnjak and Većeslav Holjevac. General Ivan Rukavina and Colonel Bogdan Oreščanin were also present. The Allied forces in Yugoslavia were represented by Red Army Colonels Vladimir Goroshchenko and Mikhail Bodrov, British Major Owen Reed, and US Office of Strategic Services Captain George Selvig.

The ZAVNOH adopted four fundamental constitutional acts. It approved the work of the Croatian delegates at the second session of the AVNOJ and, as the representative of the Federal State of Croatia, approved the establishment of the Democratic Federal Yugoslavia. It praised the latter as an expression of the wish of Croatian Croats and Serbs to live in a truly democratic South Slavic state offering full equality, the unification of Croatian lands, and the realisation of Croatian statehood. The declaration of a Croatian federal state was greeted favourably by its general public.

The ZAVNOH declared itself the "true national assembly of democratic Croatia" and its highest authority as a federal unit in Yugoslavia. Its assembly was designated as the legislature, and its 30-person executive committee as the highest executive body.

The third document adopted at the session was the Declaration of the Basic Rights of Peoples and Citizens of Democratic Croatia. In addition to the rights of ownership and property, private enterprise, and the freedom of religion and conscience, speech, the press, assembly, consultation, and association (the latter four within the Partisan movement for the duration of the war), the document specified that the Croats and Serbs of Croatia were equal regardless of politics, ethnicity, race, and religion. Worded in consideration of Ustaše repression against the Serbs, it was considered a contribution to improving Croat–Serb relations. The fourth constitutional decision determined the hierarchy of the regional national liberation committees.

In his speech at the session, Hebrang declared that the struggle was not for communism, but for democracy and national liberation (displeasing the KPJ leadership). A further point of conflict between Hebrang and the KPJ was support of the Magovac-edited HSS publication, Slobodni dom. Hebrang considered the newspaper a useful tool against Maček loyalists, but the KPJ feared the re-establishment of the HSS (although the publication was issued by the ZAVNOH). Magovac wanted to pursue HSS independence from the KPH and, finding this objective unrealistic and receiving no support from other former HSS members, he resigned his editorial and political positions.

May 1944 ZAVNOH executive committee
Name	Position
Vladimir Nazor	President
Franjo Gaži	Vice-president, HSS executive committee president
Andrija Hebrang	Vice-president, AVNOJ presidency member, KPH secretary
Rade Pribićević	Vice-president, president of the ZAVNOH Serbian Club, AVNOJ executive committee member
Pavle Gregorić	Secretary, AVNOJ executive committee member
Dušan Čalić	Deputy secretary
Stjepan Prvčić	Deputy secretary, HSS executive committee member
Duško Brkić	AVNOJ delegate, secretary of the ZAVNOH Serbian Club
Nikola Brozina	AVNOJ delegate, HSS executive committee member
Tomo Čiković	HSS executive committee member
Frane Frol	NKOJ member, AVNOJ delegate, HSS executive committee member
Maca Gržetić	AVNOJ presidency member, AFŽ president for Croatia
Aleksandar Koharević	HSS executive committee member
Slavko Komar	Unified League of Anti-Fascist Youth of Croatia executive committee member
Ivan Krajačić	AVNOJ executive committee member
Vicko Krstulović	AVNOJ executive committee member
Ivan Kuzmić	HSS executive committee member
Filip Lakuš	AVNOJ and HSS executive committee member
Božidar Magovac	NKOJ vice-president, HSS executive committee vice-president
Ante Mandić	AVNOJ executive committee member
Karlo Mrazović-Cofek	AVNOJ delegate
Stanko Ćanica-Opačić	AVNOJ executive committee member
Kata Pejnović	AVNOJ executive committee member, AFŽ president for Yugoslavia
Mile Počuča	AVNOJ delegate, secretary of the ZAVNOH Serbian Club
Vanja Radauš	sculptor
Svetozar Rittig	St. Mark's Church, Zagreb parish priest
Zlatan Sremec	NKOJ commissioner, HSS executive committee secretary
Marijan Stilinović	AVNOJ delegate
Stanko Škare	AVNOJ delegate, HSS executive committee secretary
Ante Vrkljan	AVNOJ and HSS executive committee secretary
Rade Žigić	Commissar of the Main Staff of the National Liberation Army in Croatia, AVNOJ delegate

=== Fourth session ===
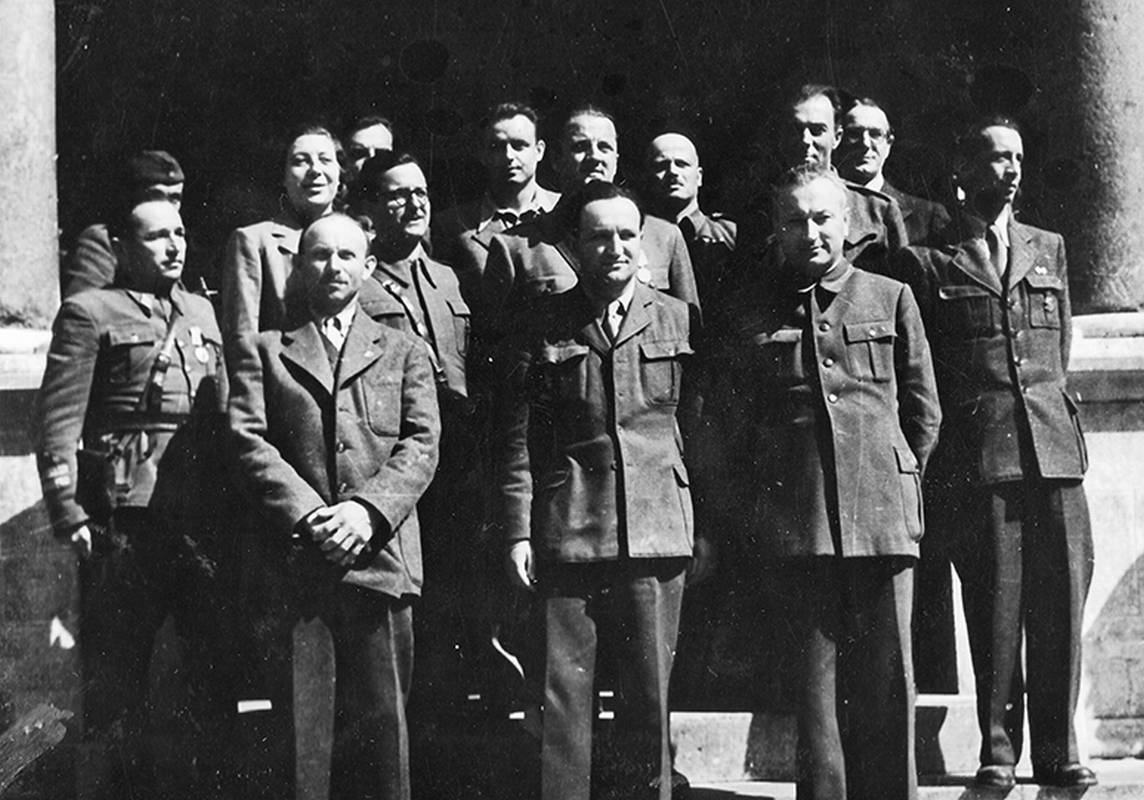
The People's Government of Croatia, led by Vladimir Bakarić, was sworn in in April 1945.

The conflict between Tito and the KPJ, on one hand, and Hebrang, ZAVNOH and the KPH gradually deepened. In September 1944, Tito criticised the ZAVNOH regulation introducing religion as a mandatory educational subject in Croatia's Partisan-held territory. Days later, he accused Hebrang of nationalism for establishing the Croatian Telegraphic Agency as an independent news agency. By 20 October, Hebrang was replaced by Vladimir Bakarić as secretary of the KPH central committee. Due to his popularity in Croatia, however, he was called to recently captured Belgrade and appointed Yugoslav minister of industry.

In early January 1945, the ZAVNOH moved its seat to Šibenik to prepare for the post-war period. Its executive committee met in Split on 14 April to proclaim the Decision on the People's Government, presided over by Bakarić. The ZAVNOH moved to Zagreb on 20 May, holding its fourth session on 25 July at the Croatian Parliament building in St. Mark's Square. It renamed itself the National Parliament of Croatia (Narodni Sabor Hrvatske), emphasising the Croatian legislative body's continuity as representative of Croatian state sovereignty.

== Legacy ==
=== Croatian Spring ===
After World War II, Yugoslavia was organized into a federation of six republics; Serbia also had two autonomous provinces.

Twenty five years after the war, during the 1971 political upheaval known as the Croatian Spring, the then-leaders of the League of Communists of Croatia (Savez komunista Hrvatske, SKH) publicly stated that the status of Croats in Yugoslavia had not been resolved in accordance with ZAVNOH decisions, and they advocated a reform of the Yugoslav federation. Mika Tripalo cited decisions made at the council's third session as confirmation of the statehood of Yugoslav republics, and the SKH leaders asked for increased powers of the Yugoslav republics to reflect their national sovereignty. They emphasised that the wartime national liberation struggle was not only intended to be a social liberation, but also a reform of relations among the Yugoslav nations.

The SKH leadership borrowed from the nation-related themes employed by the KPH leadership nearly three decades earlier: promoting Croatian unity and its culture, language and history, and acknowledging the role of the Catholic Church. They sought to address the over-representation of Serbs in public institutions such as the police, the league, and some state-owned enterprises. Although the SKH leadership was forced to resign by Tito and many of their policies were reversed, their efforts to reform Yugoslavia were considered by a federal commission in 1971. The commission introduced constitutional amendments confirming the statehood of the Yugoslav republics which were retained in the 1974 constitution.

=== Memorial ===
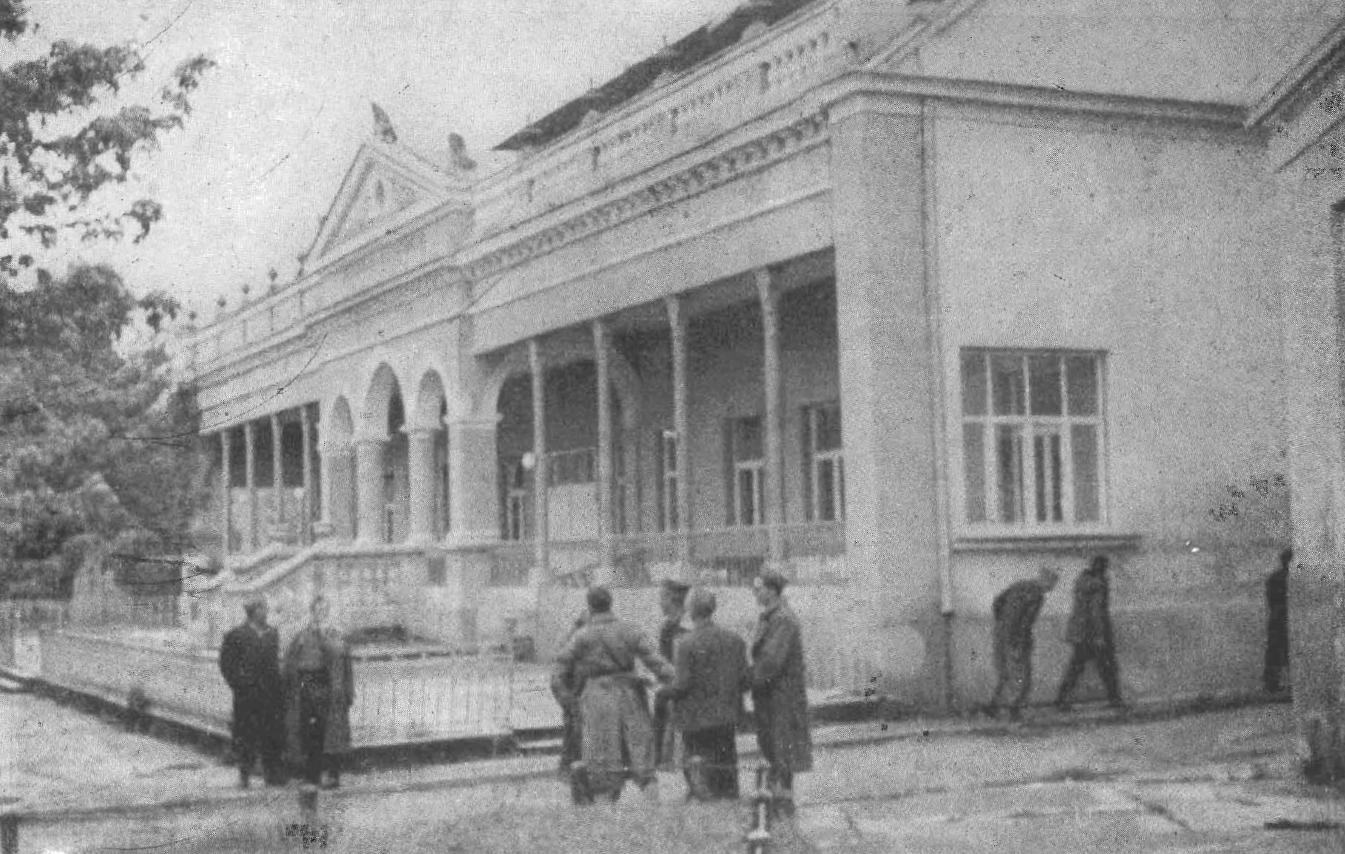
Topusko spa restaurant building in late 1945.

The Topusko spa restaurant building, where the ZAVNOH's third session was held, was converted into a memorial in 1984 to commemorate the session's 40th anniversary. According to news reports, the building was blown up on 14 September 1991 by the Croatian armed forces or police as they retreated before the 7th Banija Division of the armed forces of the Republic of Serbian Krajina and the Yugoslav People's Army captured Topusko during the Croatian War of Independence. Although an initiative to restore the building was launched in 2007 by the municipal government (supported by Parliament), it had produced no results by 2019.

=== Constitution of Croatia ===
The ZAVNOH has been frequently noted as part of the foundations of Croatia as a republic in Yugoslavia and the independent Republic of Croatia. In its preamble, the Croatian constitution (adopted in 1990) cites decisions adopted by the ZAVNOH as part of the historical foundations of Croatian statehood and its right to national sovereignty. In a speech commemorating the fifth anniversary of the independence of Croatia, President Franjo Tuđman said that it was the ZAVNOH's work which allowed Croatia to declare its independence.

In November 1991, the Arbitration Commission of the Peace Conference on Yugoslavia (also known as the Badinter Commission) was established to evaluate candidates for recognition as states after the breakup of Yugoslavia by providing opinions on a set of legal questions. About the question of whether the Serbian populations in Croatia and Bosnia and Herzegovina have the right to self-determination, acting president of the Presidency of Yugoslavia Branko Kostić said that the ZAVNOH gave the Croats and the Serbs of Croatia the position of "constituent nations". According to Kostić, the Croatian Constitution reduced the Serbs of Croatia to a national minority who should have the right to secede from Croatia if Croatian independence was recognised. In January 1992, the Badinter Commission ruled that the Serbs living in Croatia and Bosnia and Herzegovina were entitled to the rights attributed to minorities and ethnic groups under international law; however, it did not use the term "constituent nation".
