= Juraj Šutej =

Croatian and Yugoslavian politician

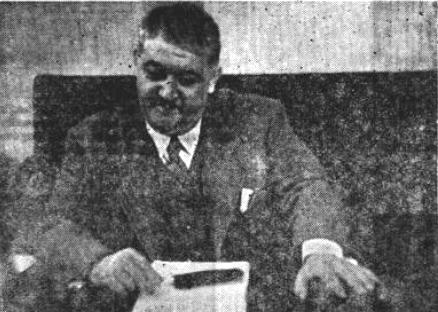
- Born: 4 December 1889; Podorašac, Bosnia and Herzegovina, Austria-Hungary
- Died: 15 April 1976 (aged 86); Zagreb, Yugoslavia (now Croatia)
- Occupations: Politician, lawyer
- Political party: Croatian Peasant Party

Juraj Šutej (4 December 1889 – 15 April 1976) was a lawyer and Croatian and Yugoslavian politician.

Born in Podorašac, he was a member of the Croatian Peasant Party (Hrvatska seljačka stranka, HSS). He was elected member of the Yugoslav Parliament from Duvno and Split districts in the 1927, 1935, and 1938 elections. He served as the Yugoslav Finance Minister in the cabinets of Dragiša Cvetković and Dušan Simović in 1939–1941, as well as in the Yugoslav government-in-exile under Ivan Šubašić. In the Provisional Government of the Democratic Federal Yugoslavia dominated by the Communist Party of Yugoslavia (Komunistička partija Jugoslavije, KPJ) and led by Josip Broz Tito, Šutej was a minister without portfoilio. He resigned from the post in October 1945 along with Šubašić (then the foreign minister) in protest against KPJ's breaches of the Tito–Šubašić Agreements which were the basis of the government. The HSS boycotted the 1945 Yugoslavian parliamentary election, but Šutej unsuccessfully tried to revive its political work in 1946 before being overruled by the HSS leadership – prompting him to retire from politics. He died in Zagreb.
