= Filip Lakuš =

- Born: 24 March 1888; Vižovlje near Veliko Trgovišće, Croatia-Slavonia, Austria-Hungary (now Croatia)
- Died: 3 August 1958 (aged 70); Sesvete, Yugoslavia (now Croatia)
- Occupation: Politician
- Political party: Croatian Peasant Party (until 1945); Croatian Republican Peasant Party (from 1945)

Filip Lakuš (24 March 1888 – 3 August 1958) was a Croatian and Yugoslavian politician. Lakuš was among the leaders of the 1920 Croatian Peasant Rebellion in and around Križ. He was a member of the Croatian Peasant Party (HSS) and the group that split from the party known as the Croatian Republican Peasant Party (HRSS). In 1943, Lakuš joined a faction of the HSS cooperating with the Yugoslav Partisans against the Axis powers following the World War II invasion of Yugoslavia. He was a delegated to the State Anti-fascist Council for the National Liberation of Croatia (ZAVNOH) as well as the Anti-Fascist Council for the National Liberation of Yugoslavia (AVNOJ). He was appointed to the presidencies of both ZAVNOH and AVNOJ. In 1945, he was appointed a member and a vice-president of the presidium of the Parliament of the Democratic Federal Yugoslavia and subsequently of the Federal People's Republic of Yugoslavia and a member of the Yugoslav Agrarian Council until retirement in 1952.
