= Tito–Šubašić Agreements =

1944–45 agreements on post-WWII Yugoslavia

Treaty of Vis
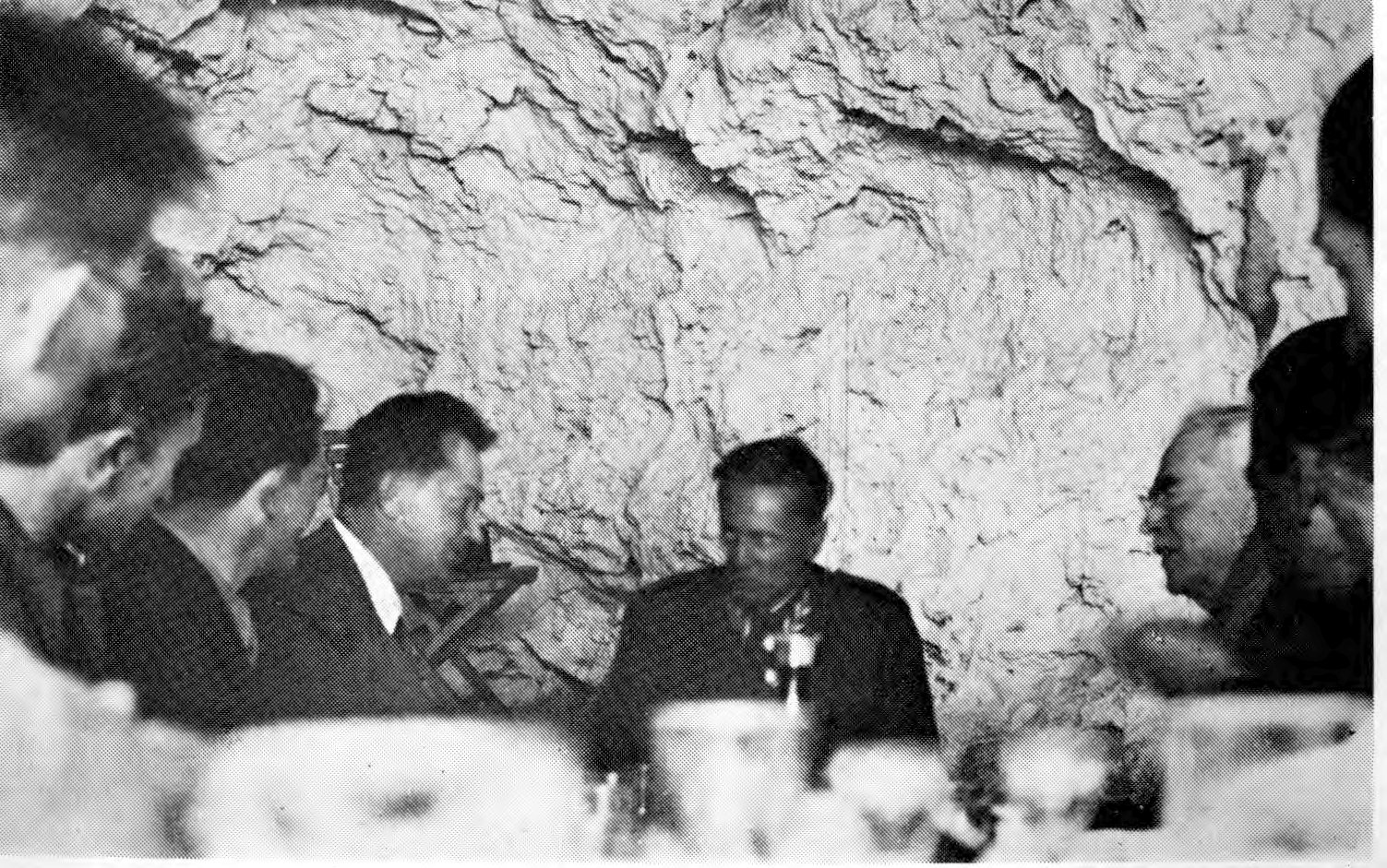
- Signed: 16 June 1944
- Location: Vis, Yugoslavia
- Signatories: (Democratic Federal Yugoslavia) Josip Broz Tito (National Committee for the Liberation of Yugoslavia); (Kingdom of Yugoslavia) Ivan Šubašić (Yugoslav government-in-exile)

Treaty of Belgrade
- Signed: 1 November 1944
- Location: Belgrade, Yugoslavia
- Signatories: (Democratic Federal Yugoslavia) Josip Broz Tito (National Committee for the Liberation of Yugoslavia); (Kingdom of Yugoslavia) Ivan Šubašić (Yugoslav government-in-exile)

The Tito–Šubašić Agreements (Serbo-Croatian: sporazumi Tito-Šubašić) are the result of a series of negotiations conducted by the leader of the Yugoslav Partisans, Josip Broz Tito, and the prime minister of the Yugoslav government-in-exile, Ivan Šubašić, in the second half of 1944 and early 1945. The agreements were designed to create a coalition government in post–World War II Yugoslavia that would be composed of representatives of the National Committee for the Liberation of Yugoslavia and the government-in-exile.

The negotiations and the resulting agreements were supported and promoted by the World War II Allies, especially the United Kingdom. The British saw the process as an opportunity to influence the formation of the post-war regime in Yugoslavia, which would otherwise be left entirely to Tito and, presumably, the Communist Party of Yugoslavia, which had spearheaded the Partisan resistance to the Axis occupation of the country. Tito saw the process as an opportunity to gain international diplomatic recognition of his power.

The Vis Agreement (Serbo-Croatian: Viški sporazum) was the initial document in the process; it was concluded on the island of Vis in June 1944. The central agreement in the series was initialled on 1 November 1944 in Belgrade, but its implementation was delayed by the need to resolve a dispute – between Tito, Šubašić, and King Peter II – regarding appointments to a regency council. The process was concluded on 7 March 1945 with the establishment of the Provisional Government of the Democratic Federal Yugoslavia. Tito thus became the prime minister of Yugoslavia.

== Background ==
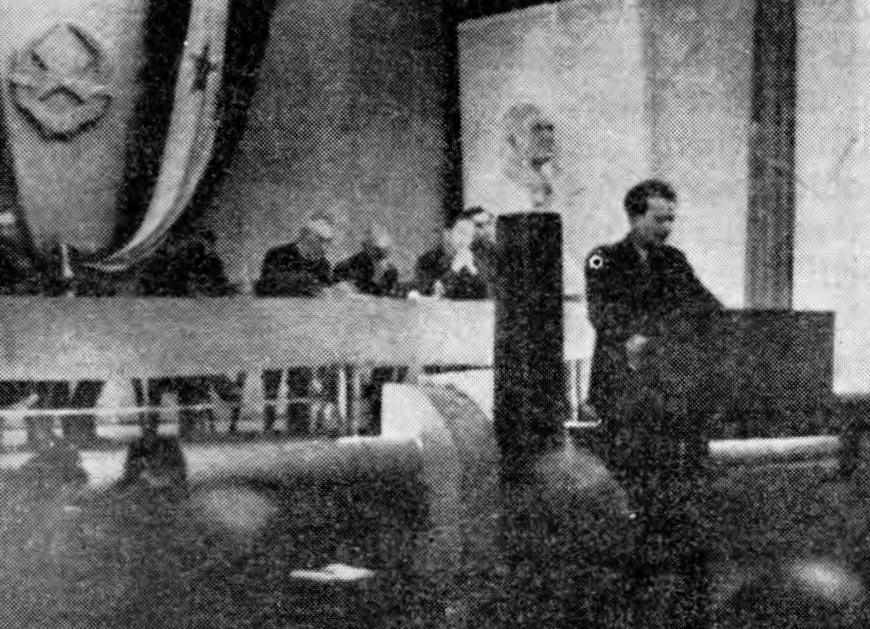
Decisions of the Anti-Fascist Council for the National Liberation of Yugoslavia meeting in Jajce in 1943 (pictured) were confirmed through the Tito–Šubašić Agreements.

In April 1941, the Axis powers invaded and soon occupied Yugoslavia. When a Yugoslav defeat seemed imminent, the Communist Party of Yugoslavia (Komunistička partija Jugoslavije, KPJ) instructed its 8,000 members to stockpile weapons in anticipation of armed resistance. By the end of 1941, armed resistance had spread to all areas of the country except Macedonia. Building on its experience with clandestine operations across the country, the KPJ proceeded to organise the Yugoslav Partisans, as resistance fighters, led by Josip Broz Tito. The KPJ assessed that the German invasion of the Soviet Union had created favourable conditions for an uprising. On 27 June 1941, in response, the KPJ politburo founded the Supreme Headquarters of the National Liberation Army of Yugoslavia, with Tito as commander-in-chief.

On 26–27 November, a pan-Yugoslav assembly – the Anti-Fascist Council for the National Liberation of Yugoslavia (Antifašističko vijeće narodnog oslobođenja Jugoslavije, AVNOJ) – was established at the instigation of Tito and the KPJ. The AVNOJ declared itself the future parliament of a new Yugoslav state, affirmed its commitment to forming a democratic federation, denied authority of the Yugoslav government-in-exile, and forbade King Peter II of Yugoslavia from returning to the country. Additionally, the National Committee for the Liberation of Yugoslavia (Nacionalni komitet oslobođenja Jugoslavije, NKOJ) was established and confirmed by the AVNOJ as an all-Yugoslav executive body.

On 3 June, Tito was evacuated to Bari, after his headquarters in Drvar were overrun in consequence of a German airborne landing in late May 1944. Shortly afterwards, he was transported by destroyer HMS Blackmore to the island of Vis. By 9 June, British and Soviet missions had been established on the island.

== Vis Agreement ==
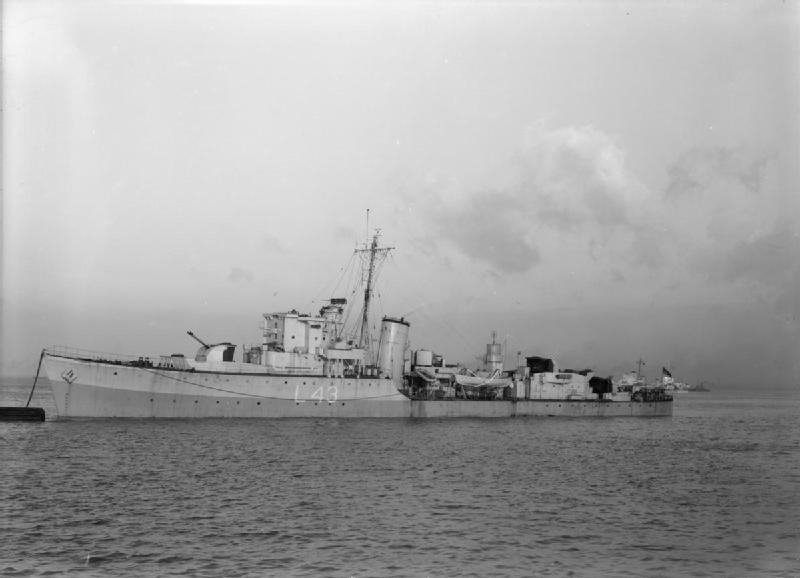
HMS Blackmore transported Tito to Vis to meet with Šubašić.

On 12 April 1944, British Prime Minister Winston Churchill began pressuring Peter II to appoint a former governor of the Banovina of Croatia, Ivan Šubašić, to the position of prime minister of the government-in-exile. Peter II complied on 1 June, and Šubašić accepted the position, returning from the United States where he had been living since 1941. Šubašić met with Tito on the Island of Vis two weeks later. Similarly, Churchill sent a letter to Tito ahead of the meeting, stating the importance the British government placed on a future agreement between him and the government-in-exile.

The meeting produced the Vis Agreement, which declared that it was the will of the signatories to form a coalition government, but that the system of government in Yugoslavia would only be decided on once the war was over. Furthermore, Šubašić accepted the decisions made by the AVNOJ in November 1943, and he recognised the legitimacy of bodies established by the AVNOJ. The question of retaining or abolishing the Yugoslav monarchy was left for after the war. The agreement was signed on 16 June. At the time, Tito said that he was primarily concerned about the liberation of the country – and claimed that the establishment of a communist regime was not a major aim.

== Naples Conference and flight to Moscow ==
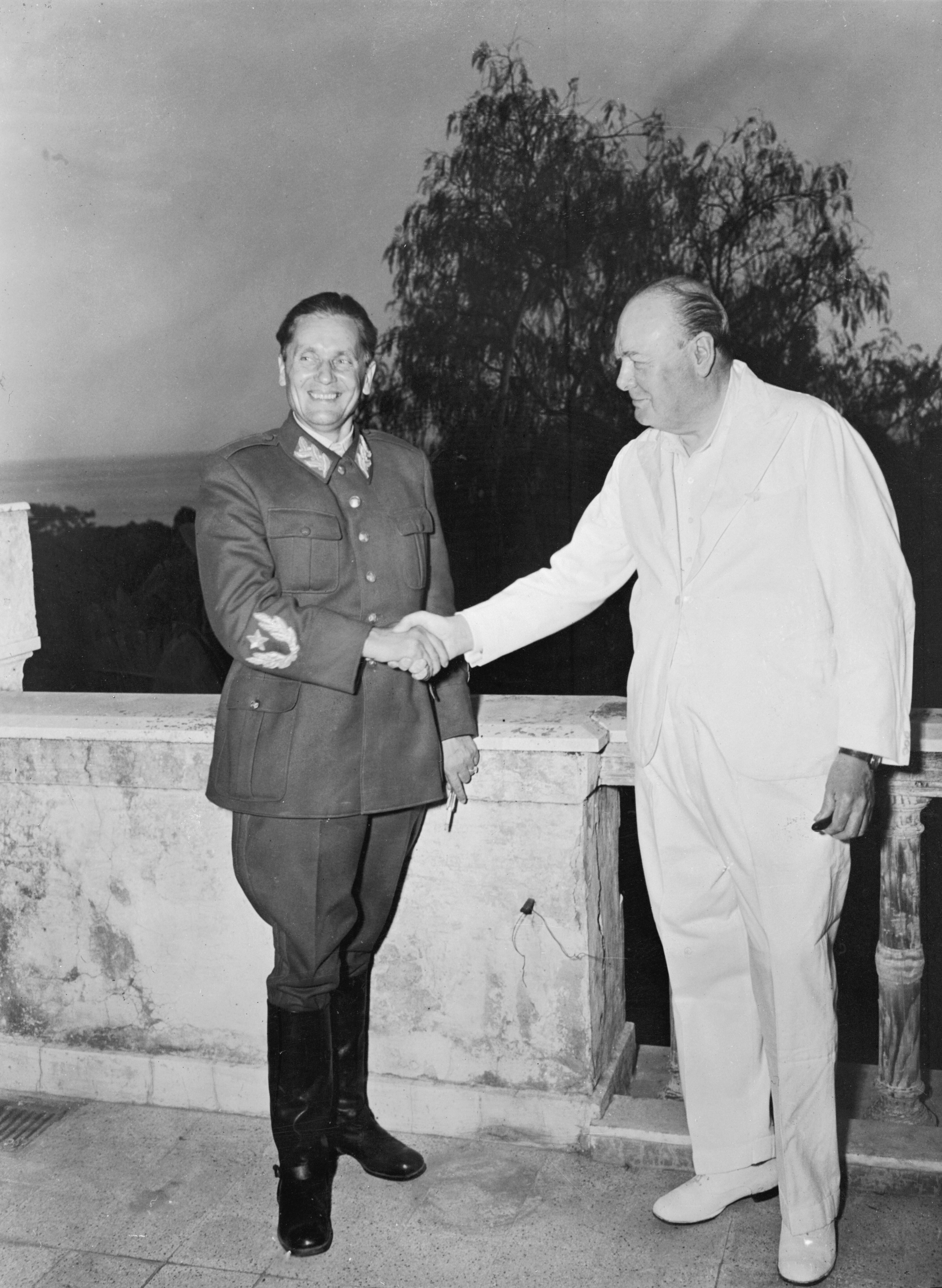
Winston Churchill met with Tito in Naples in 1944.

Churchill deemed that Tito was not doing enough in return for British support, particularly citing British protection of the Yugoslav island of Vis. His discontent was echoed by the British Foreign Office. The situation led to a meeting between Churchill and Tito in Naples on 12 August. There, Churchill presented Tito with a British request that Tito publicly renounce any possibility of resorting to armed force to influence the adoption of a political system in post-war Yugoslavia. Churchill also wanted Tito to declare that he was not pursuing the establishment of a Communist regime after the war. Tito evaded these issues in the meeting.

A month later, on 12 September, Peter II broadcast a proclamation that called upon national unity and allegiance to Tito. On 18 September, Tito met with Soviet leader Joseph Stalin in Moscow and secured the promise of Red Army help in the upcoming Belgrade Offensive, as well as its departure shortly afterwards. Most significantly, the meeting signified Soviet recognition of Tito’s authority in Yugoslavia. The British realised that Soviet forces would enter Yugoslavia, which would limit British influence. During the Fourth Moscow Conference, in an attempt at mitigation, Churchill sought to limit Soviet influence in Yugoslavia through the Percentages Agreement.

== Belgrade agreement ==
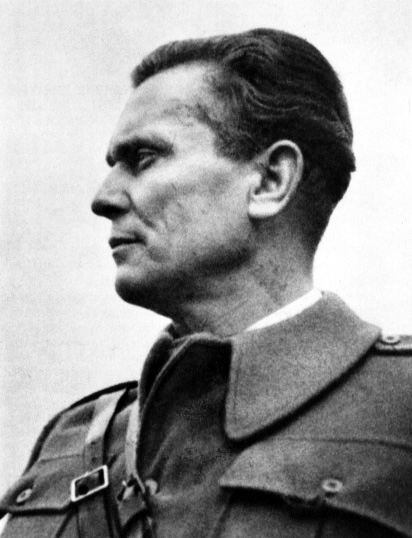
Josip Broz Tito obtained recognition of his rule in Yugoslavia through his agreements with Ivan Šubašić.

Shortly afterward, Šubašić returned to Yugoslavia, arriving at Tito’s headquarters in Vršac on 23 October 1944. As the two were scheduled to resume their talks on post-war government, both were sent a joint message from the British and Soviet foreign ministers – Anthony Eden and Vyacheslav Molotov – expressing hope that the talks would result in the establishment of a coalition government. Tito and Šubašić resumed talks on 28 October. On 1 November, British and Soviet mission chiefs were asked to attend the initialling of the draft agreement as witnesses.

In the new agreement, the parties spelled out a detailed plan for a coalition government as envisaged on Vis earlier that year. The agreement initially specified that the new government would have 18 members – 12 drawn from the ranks of the NKOJ and 6 from the government-in-exile. Tito was to be the prime minister, while Šubašić would be his deputy and the foreign minister. The new government would call an election to decide the country's system of governance. In the meantime, Yugoslavia would theoretically remain a monarchy. Peter II would be the titular head of the country, but he would remain abroad. In his stead, the agreement provided for a council of three regents to represent the king in Yugoslavia, although it was also decided that the agreement would only be signed with the king's approval.

Since Tito’s position was backed by a substantial Partisan force in the country, and Šubašić had no such power to press for a different agenda, the regency is interpreted as a concession by Tito to the government-in-exile, designed to promote good will among the Western Allies. The agreement also determined that, once the war was over, the new government would issue a declaration supporting democratic liberties and personal freedoms, including the free practise of religion and a free press. However, Tito had started to publicly change his position by January 1945.

British diplomats pointed out that the proposed government would actually have 28 voting members (with an additional 10 drawn from the NKOJ) and that half of Šubašić's contingent in the new government supported Tito – giving Tito a 25 to 3 edge. Furthermore, Šubašić went to Moscow on 20 November to seek Stalin's support for the agreement before returning to London. This course of action led Peter II to consider sacking Šubašić, and only Churchill's intervention dissuaded him.

On 7 December, Tito and Šubašić signed two additional agreements dealing with the election of a constituent assembly, the disposition of the property of Peter II, and the regency council. In a meeting held that day, the head of British mission to Yugoslavia Fitzroy Maclean told Tito that the British would only consider diplomatic recognition of his authority if he and Šubašić successfully formed a coalition government.

== Regency dispute ==
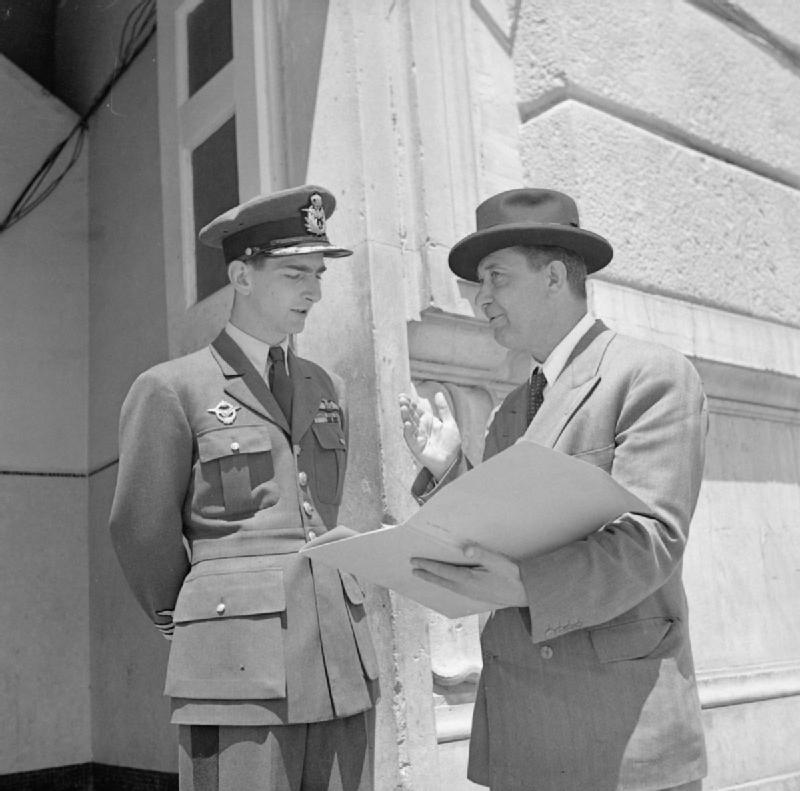
Peter II of Yugoslavia (left) and the Prime Minister of the Yugoslav government-in-exile Ivan Šubašić clashed over composition of the regency council envisaged by the Tito–Šubašić Agreements.

In a meeting with Churchill and Eden on 21 December, and in his letters to the British Prime Minister of 29 December 1944 and 4 January 1945, Peter II rejected the proposed regency as unconstitutional. Nonetheless, Churchill pressed the king to accept all decisions of the future Yugoslav government regarding the regency. Regardless, on 11 January the king formally objected to the regency and the AVNOJ having legislative powers, and rejected the Tito–Šubašić Agreement. On 22 January, the king sacked Šubašić for concluding the agreement without consulting him on the matter.

In response, the British sought, and received, United States support for Šubašić to proceed, over the king's objections, with implementation of the agreement with Tito, who was informed of, and accepted, such a proceeding. The British may have been motivated by fear that the USSR might unilaterally recognise the NKOJ as the Yugoslav government. In the period of 25–29 January, Peter II retracted his dismissal of Šubašić after negotiating with him and agreeing that the government-in-exile would resign and Šubašić would be re-appointed with the task of furthering the king's views on his right to appoint the regency.

As the Šubašić-led government was scheduled to return to Belgrade on 7 February, the king proposed a regency consisting of army general and former prime minister Dušan Simović, Juraj Šutej (a Croat in Šubašić’s government), and Dušan Sernec (a Slovene member of the NKOJ). On 5 February, Tito refused to accept Šutej and proposed Ante Mandić (a Croat member of the AVNOJ) instead. The next day, Šubašić opposed Simović’s appointment, citing his decision to surrender to the Axis powers in 1941 without consulting other government ministers. Instead, he proposed to appoint Sreten Vukosavljević, who was a member of his government in the period after the Vis Agreement. The dispute led to a delay in relocating the government.

The Tito–Šubašić agreement was discussed and supported at the Yalta Conference, which issued a communique calling for implementation of the agreement, expansion of the AVNOJ to include members of old Yugoslav parliament who did not collaborate with the Axis powers, and submission of acts of the AVNOJ to ratification by an elected constituent assembly. The Yalta communique was relayed to Tito by Maclean, and Tito accepted it in full. Peter II and Šubašić accepted the communique on 12 February. The king replaced Simović's regency nomination of Vukosavljević with that of Milan Grol, while persisting in nominating Šutej to the council. Tito rejected both appointments.

On 26 February, Tito and Šubašić concluded a further agreement specifying Srnec and Mandić as Slovene and Croat members of the regency council and providing a list of four potential Serb members of the regency for the king to choose from. The king was informed that he had until the end of the week to comply, otherwise his consent would be presumed. Peter II complied and selected Srđan Budisavljević (a former minister in the government-in-exile). The king presented his decision to the president of the AVNOJ, Ivan Ribar, in London on 3 March. The Šubašić government resigned three days later. The regency council, in its only official act, then appointed a 28-member provisional government of Yugoslavia on 7 March, in compliance with the Tito–Šubašić Agreement

== Aftermath ==
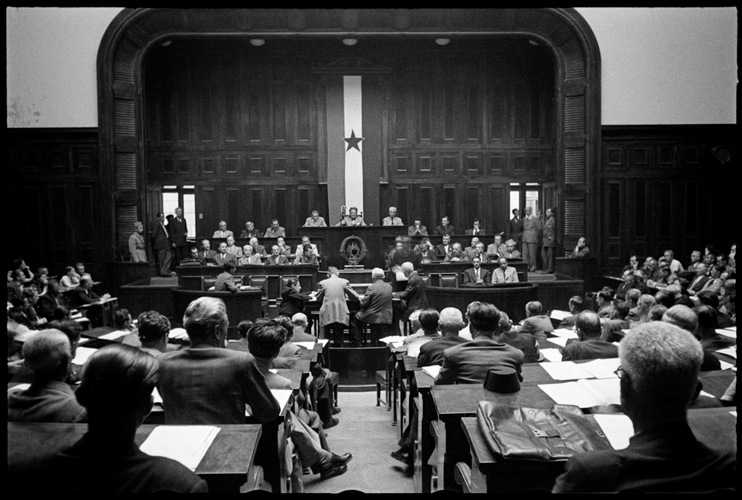
The third session of the AVNOJ in 1945 included some pre-war members of the Yugoslav Parliament.

In recognition of the new Yugoslav government, British, Soviet, and US ambassadors were posted to Belgrade in the second half of March. Initially, the new government opted to proclaim its anti-fascism, the "brotherhood and unity" of nations living in Yugoslavia, and general humanistic values. However, as the elections scheduled for autumn of 1945 were approaching, Communists were gradually appointed to key positions, and civil rights and freedoms were increasingly curtailed. Also, legislation was introduced to prosecute real and perceived enemies of the people and the state.

On one hand, the government-in-exile and Šubašić meant to limit communist control over the government of post-war Yugoslavia through the agreements with Tito, possibly with British assistance. On the other hand, Tito sought to use the agreements to boost the legitimacy of his claim to power by associating himself with the government-in-exile and the formation of a broad governing coalition. The provisional government established in March 1945 included Tito as the prime minister and Šubašić as the foreign minister, the latter as one of eleven non-communist government ministers. However, only six of the eleven were previously members of the government-in-exile. Out of that six, only three were not supporters of, or not otherwise affiliated with, the Partisans – Šubašić, Šutej, and Grol, all of whom resigned their positions within months – Grol in August and the others in October.

== Bibliography ==
- Calic, Marie-Janine (2019). A History of Yugoslavia. West Lafayette, Indiana: Purdue University Press. ISBN 978-1-55753-838-3.
- Hoare, Marko Attila (2013). The Bosnian Muslims in the Second World War. Oxford, UK: Oxford University Press. ISBN 978-0-231-70394-9.
- Lukic, Renéo; Lynch, Allen (1996). Europe from the Balkans to the Urals: The Disintegration of Yugoslavia and the Soviet Union. Stockholm, Sweden: Stockholm International Peace Research Institute. ISBN 9780198292005.
- Murray, Chris (2019). "From resistance to revolution: occupied Yugoslavia". In Murray, Chris (ed.). Unknown Conflicts of the Second World War: Forgotten Fronts. Abingdon, UK: Routledge. pp. 139–170. ISBN 978-1-138-61294-5.
- Ramet, Sabrina P. (2006). The Three Yugoslavias: State-building and Legitimation, 1918–2005. Bloomington, Indiana: Indiana University Press. ISBN 9780253346568.
- Roberts, Walter R. (1973). Tito, Mihailović, and the Allies, 1941-1945. New Brunswick, New Jersey: Rutgers University Press. ISBN 978-0-8135-0740-8.
- Tomasevich, Jozo (2001). War and Revolution in Yugoslavia, 1941–1945: Occupation and Collaboration. Stanford, California: Stanford University Press. ISBN 978-0-8047-0857-9.
- Vukšić, Velimir (2003). Tito's Partisans 1941–45. Oxford, UK: Osprey Publishing. ISBN 1-84176-675-5.
