= Božidar Magovac =

Croatian journalist and politician

- Božidar Magovac in 1940
- Born: 13 October 1908; Zagreb, Croatia-Slavonia, Austria-Hungary (now Croatia)
- Died: 24 January 1955 (aged 46); Zagreb, Yugoslavia
- Occupations: Politician, journalist
- Political party: Croatian Peasant Party

Božidar Magovac (13 October 1908 – 24 January 1955) was a Croatian journalist and politician, a prominent member of the Croatian Peasant Party (Hrvatska seljačka stranka, HSS).

A native of Zagreb, between December 1939 and April 1941, Magovac was the editor of HSS newspaper Seljački dom (Peasant Home) jointly with Juraj Krnjević, when the World War II invasion of Yugoslavia happened.

In 1943, he moved to the territory held by Yugoslav Partisans and led a faction of the HSS cooperating with them against the Axis powers. He called on the HSS members to follow his example in a proclamation distributed as leaflets and broadcast by the BBC. During the second session of the State Anti-fascist Council for the National Liberation of Croatia (Zemaljsko antifašističko vijeće narodnog oslobođenja Hrvatske, ZAVNOH) established and dominated by the Communist Party of Croatia (Komunistička partija Hrvatske, KPH) as the supreme representative body in Croatia, Magovac founded the HSS executive committee as the top governing body of the HSS in the national liberation movement. There he published the Slobodni dom (Free Home) as a party newspaper.

As a ZAVNOH delegate, Magovac was also appointed a member of the Anti-Fascist Council for the National Liberation of Yugoslavia (Antifašističko vijeće narodnog oslobođenja Jugoslavije, AVNOJ) led by the Communist Party of Yugoslavia (Komunistička partija Jugoslavije, KPJ). Magovac was appointed by the AVNOJ the vice-president of the National Committee for the Liberation of Yugoslavia.

Soon afterwards, Magovac came into conflict with the KPH secretary Andrija Hebrang over independence of the HSS within the Partisan national liberation movement and his resistance to denounce HSS president Vladko Maček a traitor for his reluctance to support the Partisans and his passivity. In turn, KPH helped Magovac's opponents within the HSS executive committee to isolate him politically and replace Magovac as the leader of the body by Franjo Gaži. Magovac was interred on the Vis Island from late 1944 until May 1945 when he moved to Zagreb.

After the war, Magovac tried to revive political activity of the HSS with Ivan Šubašić. He was arrested and imprisoned for six years in November 1948 on trumped-up charges. He died in Zagreb in 1955.

== See also ==
- Croatian Peasant Party during World War II
