= Vanja Radauš =

Croatian sculptor and artist (1906–1975)

- Born: 29 April 1906; Vinkovci, Croatia-Slavonia, Austria-Hungary
- Died: 24 April 1975 (aged 68); Zagreb, SR Croatia, SFR Yugoslavia
- Known for: Sculpture, Painting

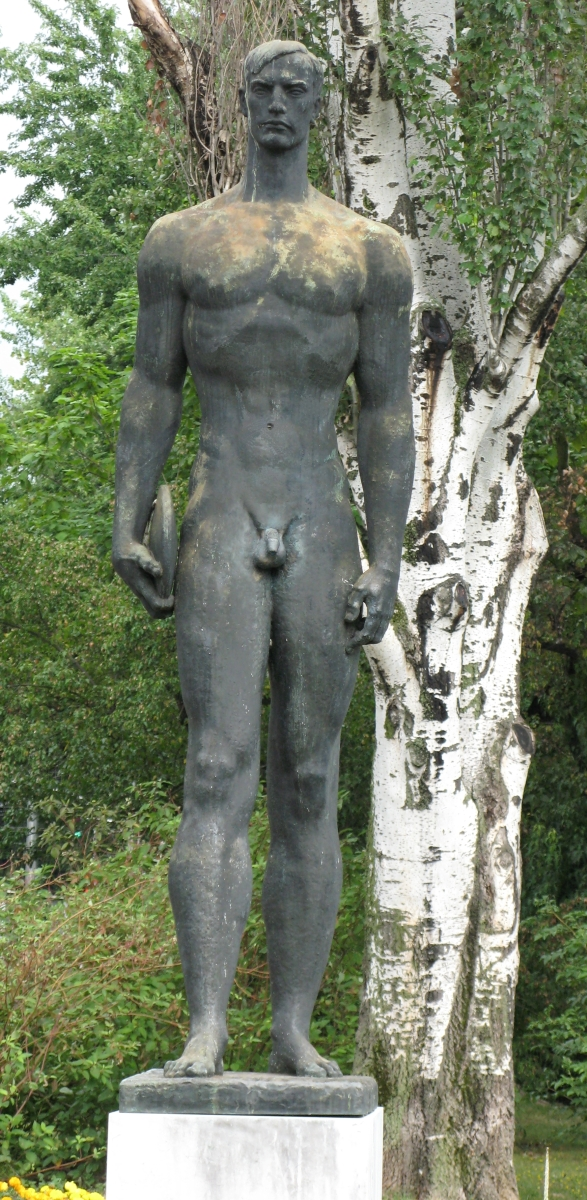
Discus Thrower (1957)

Vanja Radauš (29 April 1906 – 24 April 1975) was a Croatian sculptor, painter and writer.

== Life ==
After attending elementary and high school in his home town of Vinkovci, he studied sculpture at the Academy of Fine Arts, University of Zagreb from 1924 to 1930. During World War II he participated in the National Liberation movement. He was a professor at the Academy of Fine Arts from 1945 to 1969.

In 1975, he committed suicide. He is buried in the Mirogoj Cemetery in Zagreb.

== Work ==
His early pieces (up to 1943) show the obvious influence of Rodin and Bourdelle. After the war, he concentrated on several sculptural "cycles" including: Typhus (1956–59), Panopticum Croaticum (1959–61), Man and Limestone (1961–63) and Pillars of Croatian Culture (1969-75). His work ranges in size from medals to large monuments.

== Available writings ==
- Spomenici Slavonije iz razdoblja xvi do xix stoljeca (Monuments of Slavonia in the Nineteenth Century), Yugoslavian Academy of Science and Arts (1973)
- Slavonijo, zemljo plemenita (Slavonia, the Noble Land; poetry), Privlacica (1994) ISBN 953-156-114-1
- Budenje snova (Waking Dreams; poetry), Naklada Levak (2000) ISBN 953-178-154-0
