= Franjo Gaži =

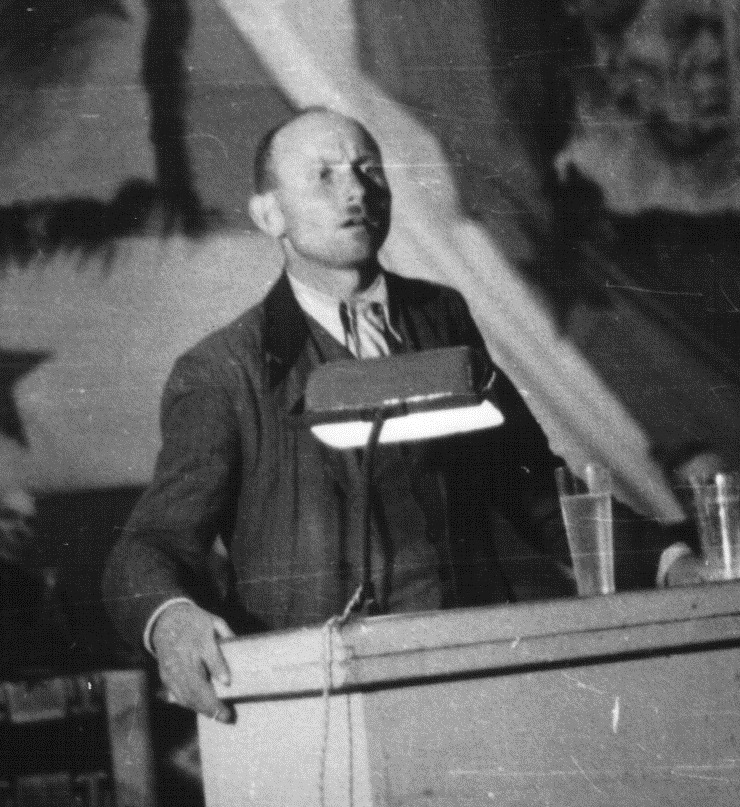
- Franjo Gaži speaking at a ZAVNOH session
- Born: 13 February 1900; Hlebine, Croatia-Slavonia, Austria-Hungary (now Croatia)
- Died: 15 November 1964 (aged 64); Zagreb, Yugoslavia (now Croatia)
- Occupation: Politician
- Political party: Croatian Peasant Party (until 1945); Croatian Republican Peasant Party (from 1945)

Franjo Gaži (13 February 1900 – 15 November 1964) was a Croatian and Yugoslavian politician.

In 1935 Yugoslavian parliamentary election he was the designated alternate of Croatian Peasant Party (Hrvatska seljačka stranka, HSS) candidate Mihovil Pavlek Miškina and became the party's district president for Koprivnica.

Following the Axis invasion of Yugoslavia during the World War II and establishment of the Independent State of Croatia (Nezavisna Država Hrvatska, NDH) in April 1941, the HSS remains largely passive, following instructions of its president Vladko Maček. At the same time, the Communist Party of Yugoslavia (Komunistička partija Jugoslavija, KPJ) and its nominally independent branch, the Communist Party of Croatia (Komunistička partija Hrvatske, KPH) launch Partisan resistance. HSS presence in the Partisan movement was established by Božidar Magovac in 1943, and Gaži soon followed him there. Magovac established the HSS executive committee in the Partisans, but after he came into conflict with the KPH secretary Andrija Hebrang, Gaži gradually replaced Magovac with Hebrang's assistance. Thus Gaži became the president of the HSS executive committee, as well as the vice-president of the State Anti-fascist Council for the National Liberation of Croatia (Zemaljsko antifašističko vijeće narodnog oslobođenja Hrvatske, ZAVNOH) established by the KPH as the supreme representative body in Croatia, and vice-president of the National Committee for the Liberation of Yugoslavia. In the final days of the war, the HSS executive committee was under increasing influence of the KPH. It was formally renamed the Croatian Republican Peasant Party and used to politically weaken Maček-led HSS.

The HRSS remained a political ally of the KPH after the war and Gaži was elected a member of the Croatian Sabor and of the Yugoslav Parliament. He was a part of several Vladimir Bakarić-led cabinets of Croatia.
