= Frane Frol =

Croatian and Yugoslavian politician

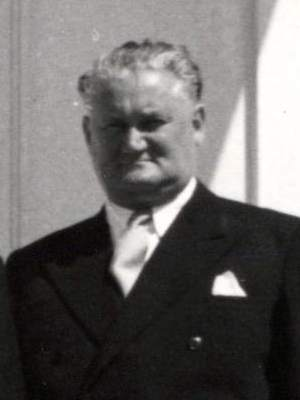
- Born: 9 March 1899; Sušak, Croatia-Slavonia, Austria-Hungary (now Croatia)
- Died: 5 June 1989 (aged 90); Zagreb, Yugoslavia (now Croatia)
- Occupations: Politician, lawyer
- Political party: Croatian Peasant Party (until 1945); Croatian Republican Peasant Party (from 1945)

Frane Frol (9 March 1899 – 5 June 1989) was a lawyer and Croatian and Yugoslavian politician. He was a member of the Croatian Peasant Party (Hrvatska seljačka stranka, HSS) and the group that split from the party known as the Croatian Republican Peasant Party (Hrvatska republikanska seljačka stranka, HRSS). In 1943, Frol joined a faction of the HSS cooperating with the Yugoslav Partisans against the Axis powers following the World War II invasion of Yugoslavia. He was a delegated to the State Anti-fascist Council for the National Liberation of Croatia (Zemaljsko antifašističko vijeće narodnog oslobođenja Hrvatske, ZAVNOH) as well as the Anti-Fascist Council for the National Liberation of Yugoslavia (Antifašističko vijeće narodnog oslobođenja Jugoslavije, AVNOJ). He was appointed to the presidencies of both ZAVNOH and AVNOJ. In 1944, he was appointed the judiciary commissioner in the National Committee for the Liberation of Yugoslavia and then the justice minister in the Provisional Government of the Democratic Federal Yugoslavia and several governments of the Federal People's Republic of Yugoslavia.
