= Dušan Sernec =

Slovene electrical engineer and politician (1882–1954)

- Dušan Sernec
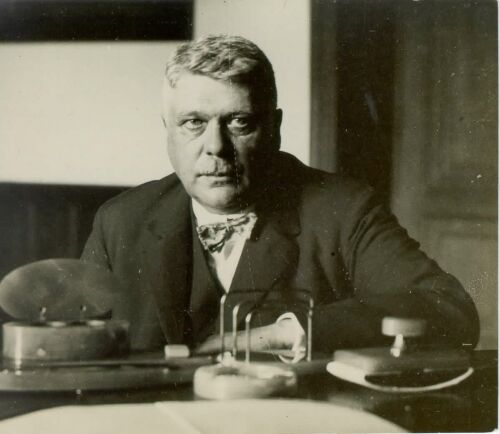
- Sernec in 1930
- Born: 8 July 1882; Maribor, Austria-Hungary
- Died: 15 February 1952 (aged 69); Ljubljana, PR Slovenia, FPR Yugoslavia
- Citizenship: Austria-Hungary; Kingdom of Yugoslavia; FPR Yugoslavia
- Occupations: Electrical engineer, politician, academic
- Known for: Member of the Regency Council of Yugoslavia (1945)

Dušan Sernec (8 July 1882 – 15 February 1952) was a Slovene electrical engineer, academic, and politician. During the interwar period he served as a minister in the government of the Kingdom of Yugoslavia and as Ban (governor) of the Drava Banovina, the administrative province that largely corresponded to modern-day Slovenia. During the Second World War he joined the Yugoslav resistance movement, and in 1945 he became one of the members of the Regency Council representing King Peter II of Yugoslavia in the provisional government that preceded the establishment of socialist Yugoslavia.

== Early life and education ==
Sernec was born in Maribor (then Marburg an der Drau), in the Austro-Hungarian Empire. He was the twelfth child of the lawyer and politician Janko Sernec, a prominent figure in Slovene public life.

After attending the gymnasium in Maribor, Sernec completed his compulsory military service in Prague, where he also began his higher education. He graduated in 1905 from the Czech Technical University in Prague with a degree in mechanical engineering. He subsequently pursued advanced studies in electrical engineering in Grenoble, Paris, and Karlsruhe.

== Engineering career ==
From 1906 to 1913 Sernec worked for the German electrical engineering company Allgemeine Elektricitäts-Gesellschaft (AEG), serving in Vienna, Trieste, and Ljubljana.

In 1913 he became director of the Carniolan provincial electricity company (Kranjske deželne elektrarne), responsible for developing electrical infrastructure in the historical region of Carniola. Under his leadership several projects aimed at electrifying the region were undertaken, including improvements to the hydroelectric facilities at Završnica near Žirovnica.

== Academic career ==
In 1923 Sernec joined the University of Ljubljana, where he became a lecturer at the Technical Faculty specializing in electrical installations and power engineering.

He was appointed associate professor in 1926 and contributed to the training of the first generation of engineers in the newly established Slovenian university system.

== Political career ==
Sernec entered politics through the Slovene People's Party, one of the dominant political organizations among Slovenes in the interwar Kingdom of Yugoslavia.

In February 1925 he was elected to the National Assembly of the Kingdom of Yugoslavia.

He first entered the Yugoslav government in 1927, when he was appointed Minister of Construction (public works). In October 1929, following the administrative reorganization of Yugoslavia into provinces known as banovinas, Sernec became the first Ban (governor) of the Drava Banovina, serving from 9 October 1929 until 4 December 1930.

In 1930 Sernec was appointed Minister of Forests and Mines in the government of General Petar Živković. He briefly returned to the position of Minister of Construction in 1931 before withdrawing from active party politics after leaving the Slovene People's Party.

== World War II ==
After the Axis invasion of Yugoslavia in April 1941 and the occupation and partition of Slovenia, Sernec joined the Liberation Front of the Slovene Nation, the main anti-fascist resistance organization in Slovenia.

In December 1942 Sernec was arrested during a Christmas raid by occupation authorities but was released shortly afterward.

In September 1943 he reached territory controlled by the Yugoslav Partisans. He subsequently participated in the Second Session of the Anti-Fascist Council for the National Liberation of Yugoslavia (AVNOJ) held in Jajce in November 1943.

== Regency and provisional government ==
Following negotiations between the Yugoslav government-in-exile and the partisan movement under the Tito–Šubašić Agreement, a Regency Council representing King Peter II was established.

On 2 March 1945 Sernec was appointed one of the three regents, together with Srđan Budisavljević and Ante Mandić, representing the monarch in the provisional government.

The government functioned until November 1945, when the monarchy was abolished and the Federal People's Republic of Yugoslavia was proclaimed.

== Later life and death ==
After the end of the provisional government, Sernec retired from political life and lived in Ljubljana. He died there on 15 February 1952 at the age of 69.

== Personal life ==
Sernec married Gabrijela Hanuš. The couple had four children, including the physician Božena Sernec Logar.

== Selected works ==
- Sernec, Dušan; Smolej, Viktor (1944). Stari politiki in javni delavci o Osvobodilni fronti, o jugoslovanskem osvobodilnem gibanju in o Titu.

Political offices
Preceded by Office established	Ban of the Drava Banovina; 1929–1930	Succeeded by Drago Marušič
