= National Committee for the Liberation of Yugoslavia =

Flag of the Yugoslav Partisans and Democratic Federal Yugoslavia

The National Committee for the Liberation of Yugoslavia (Serbo-Croatian: Nacionalni komitet oslobođenja Jugoslavije, Slovene: Nacionalni komite osvoboditve Jugoslavije, NKOJ), also known as the Yugoslav Committee of National Liberation, was the World War II provisional executive body of the Democratic Federal Yugoslavia, established on 29 November 1943 by the Yugoslav Partisans, a resistance movement and military arm of the Communist Party of Yugoslavia, led by Josip Broz Tito; in opposition to the London-based Yugoslav government-in-exile, headed by King Peter II.

== History ==
The Committee was elected by Tito's Anti-Fascist Council for the National Liberation of Yugoslavia (AVNOJ), the provisional legislative body, during its second session (29–30 November 1943), in Jajce. The Committee consisted of the President, three Vice-Presidents and the required number of Trustees, and for his work fit the AVNOJ and the Presidency of AVNOJ, which is appointed by its members. During the same session, on 30 November 1943, the AVNOJ also appointed Josip Broz Tito as Prime Minister.

The Committee pursued the liberation in hard conditions of life, supplying the armies with many difficulties and facing the consequences of war and death on devastated battlefields, with a poor economy, and problematic foreign affairs related to the international recognition of communist Yugoslavia.

The Committee seat was in Drvar until May 1944, in Vis from May to October 1944, and then in Belgrade. On 7 March 1945, following an agreement with the Yugoslav government-in-exile (Tito–Šubašić Agreements), the Committee was lifted and a new Yugoslav provisional government was formed, with Tito still as Prime Minister.

== Cabinet ==
The following list is based on the work Tito and His People by Howard Fast.

=== Presidency ===
Name	Image	Portfolio	Party	Dates
Josip Broz Tito		Prime Minister; Commissioner for Defence	Communist Party	29 November 1943 – 7 March 1945
Edvard Kardelj		Deputy Prime Minister	Communist Party	29 November 1943 – 7 March 1945
Vladislav S. Ribnikar		Deputy Prime Minister; Commissioner for Information	Communist Party	29 November 1943 – 7 March 1945
Božidar Magovac		Deputy Prime Minister	Croatian Peasant Party	29 November 1943 – 30 August 1944
Franjo Gaži		Deputy Prime Minister	Croatian Peasant Party	30 August 1944 – 7 March 1945

=== Commissioners ===
- Josip Smodlaka, for Foreign Affairs
- Vlada Zečević, for Internal Affairs
- Ivan Milutinović, for Agriculture
- Dušan Sernec, for Finance
- Sreten Žujović, for Transport
- Milivoj Jambrišak, for Public Health (until 10 December 1943)
- Zlatan Sremec, for Public Health (since 10 December 1943)
- Todor Vujasinović, for Economic Reconstruction
- Anton Kržišnik, for Social Affairs (Social Welfare)
- Frane Frol, for Justice
- Mile Peruničić, for Supplies
- Rade Pribićević, for Public Works (Buildings)
- Sulejman Filipović, for Forests and Mines (Forestry)
- Andrija Hebrang, for Trade and Industry (since 31 October 1944)

Others

- Edvard Kocbek, for Slovenia, and for Education
- Emanuel Čučkov, for Agriculture
- Nikola Petrović, for Trade and Supply

As the war didn't allow all members to be in session, the Presidency appointed the following Deputy Commissioners:

- Vladimir Bakarić, for Foreign Affairs
- Ivan Milutinović (Agriculture), for Finance/Economy
- Sreten Žujović (Transport), for Buildings
- Todor Vujasinović (Economic Reconstruction), for Food
- Edward Kocbek (Slovenia/Education), for Social Affairs

== Bibliography ==
- Fast, Howard (1944). Tito's Collaborators.
- Pijade, Moša, ed. (1953). Прво и друго заседање Антифашистичког већа народног ослобођења Југославије (26 и 27 новембра 1942, 29 и 30 новембра 1943) по стенографским белешкама и другим изворима [The First and the Second Sessions of the Anti-Fascist Council for the National Liberation of Yugoslavia (26–27 November 1942, 29–30 November 1943) According to Shorthand Records and Other Sources] (in Serbian). Belgrade: Presidium of the National Assembly of the Federative People's Republic of Yugoslavia. OCLC 632104149.
