= Sreten Vukosavljević =

- Born: Sreten Vukosavljević; 5 March 1881; Prijepolje, Ottoman Empire (now Prijepolje, Serbia)
- Died: 9 August 1960 (aged 79); Rovinj, PR Croatia, FPR Yugoslavia (now Croatia)
- Scientific career
- Fields: Sociology
- Workplaces: Faculty of Law, University of Belgrade

Sreten Vukosavljević (Prijepolje, 5 March 1881 — Rovinj, 9 August 1960) was a Serbian sociologist, university professor, politician, leader of National liberation of Yugoslavia during WWII and former Komitas commander in Old Serbia during the struggles for emancipation from foreign occupation. He was called the father of "rural sociology" in Yugoslavia.

== Biography ==
He was born on 6 March 1881 in Prijepolje. After completing his education in Pljevlja Gymnasium, Valjevo, Aleksinac and Belgrade, he taught in village schools in the Timok Valley for four years. In 1905 he was appointed director of primary schools in Prijepolje. In 1909 he was appointed inspector of schools in Cetinje for the entire Principality of Montenegro and in 1911 he moved to Skopje where he was made in charge of all Serbian schools. There he also joined the Komitadji.

During 1911 and 1912, he commanded the Komitas detachment in the Javor region. He participated in the First Balkan War, Second Balkan War and the Great War, from 1914 until 1918. During the Balkan Wars he was the Komitas commander of the volunteers from old Raška (region) and Polimlje oblast. With the Komitas detachment he freed Priboj in the Zlatibor District of Serbia. He participated in World War I but in 1917 he was accused of being a member of the Black Hand, he was acquitted at a trial in Thessaloniki.

In 1943 during WWII Vukosavljevic joined the People liberation movement and in November of same year he became president of State anti-fascist council for the people liberation of Sanjak. He was participant of Second congress of AVNOJ, held in Jajce on 29th and 30 November on which he was elected as member of presidency.

In July 1944. on proposal of president of National committee of liberation of Yugoslavia, he became minister of food supply and restoration of forests and ore in Government of Dr. Ivan Šubašić.

== Career in Sociology ==
The rural sociology has had a deep and fertile tradition in Serbia. From earlier times of particular importance in this scientific discipline are the works of Vuk Karadžić, Valtazar Bogišić, Jovan Cvijić and Sreten Vukosavljević. Vukosavljević devoted a great part of his life to the study of the village and the peasant. His principal works deal with the rural customs concerning irrigation (1947), the forms of landed properties (1953), tribes and other institutions in the country, and particularly the sociology of habitation.

After World War II, he became a prominent political worker in focus of decentralization and agriculture policy, and continued to teach at the University of Belgrade. He was also a journalist.

Vukosavljević with his work and Teaching diploma qualified as a permanent professor of Law faculty at the Faculty of Law, University of Belgrade, thanks to his published work.

== See also ==
- List of Chetnik voivodes

== Bibliography ==
- History of Village-bonded society 1: Organisation of village property. Službeni glasnik. 2012. ISBN 978-86-519-0457-1.
- History of Village-bonded society 2: Sociology of Housing. Službeni glasnik. 2012. ISBN 978-86-519-0458-8.
