= Ante Mandić =

Croatian politician (1881–1959)

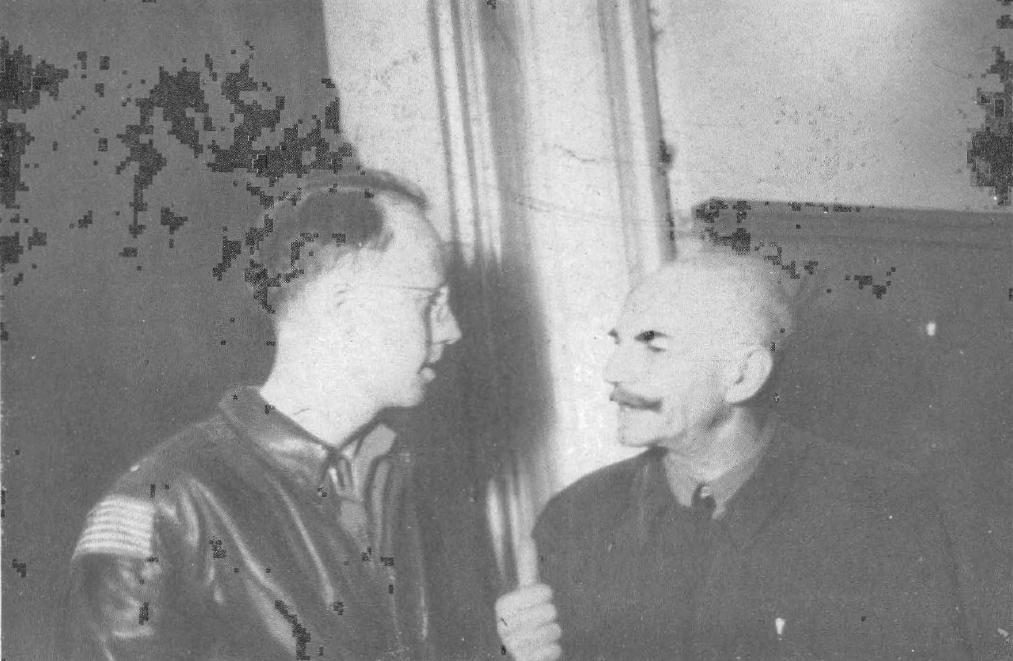
- Ante Mandić (pictured right) at the third session of the ZAVNOH in Topusko, 1944.
- Born: 2 June 1881; Trieste, Austrian Littoral, Austria-Hungary
- Died: 15 September 1959 (aged 78); Lovran, PR Croatia, FPR Yugoslavia
- Occupations: Politician, lawyer
- Relatives: Josip Mandić (brother); Matko Mandić (uncle)

Ante Mandić (2 June 1881 – 15 September 1959) was a lawyer and Croatian and Yugoslavian politician.

Born in Trieste, he studied law at the University of Vienna and obtained his doctoral degree in law from the University of Graz. He worked in the law office of Gjuro Červar in Opatija. Mandić was visiting his wife's family in the area of Kyiv in summer of 1914 and he remained there following the outbreak of the World War I.

During the war, as a representative of the Yugoslav Committee in Saint Petersburg from 1915, Mandić helped organise a Yugoslav volunteer detachment in Odesa—the First Serbian Volunteer Division. He moved to London in 1917 to work as the secretary of the central office of the Yugoslav Committee in London. In 1918, Mandić returned to the newly-formed Kingdom of Serbs, Croats and Slovenes (later renamed "Yugoslavia"). In 1920 and 1921, Mandić also helped organise and lead several political associations in Zagreb before moving to then Italian Volosko to pursue a career law. Under pressure from Italian authorities, Mandić moved to Belgrade in 1937. There he stayed at the home of Milivoj Jambrišak, a physician who he met during the war in Russia. Both moved to Opatija following the Axis powers invasion of Yugoslavia in April 1941, and stayed there until the surrender of Italy.

Mandić moved to the territory held by the Yugoslav Partisans led by the Communist Party of Yugoslavia against the Axis occupation. Mandić was appointed the president of the National Liberation Committee in Opatija, a delegate to the State Anti-fascist Council for the National Liberation of Croatia (ZAVNOH). He was elected as a member of the Anti-Fascist Council for the National Liberation of Yugoslavia (AVNOJ) presidency. A year later, in 1944, he was appointed the head of the district National Liberation Committee for Istria and the Federal State of Croatia's Commission for War Crimes. In March–November 1945, Mandić was a member of the royal regency council under the Tito–Šubašić Agreements of 1944-1945.

Mandić was a nephew of politician and publicist Matko Mandić, and the older brother of composer Josip Mandić.
