= Pavle Gregorić =

Croatian politician

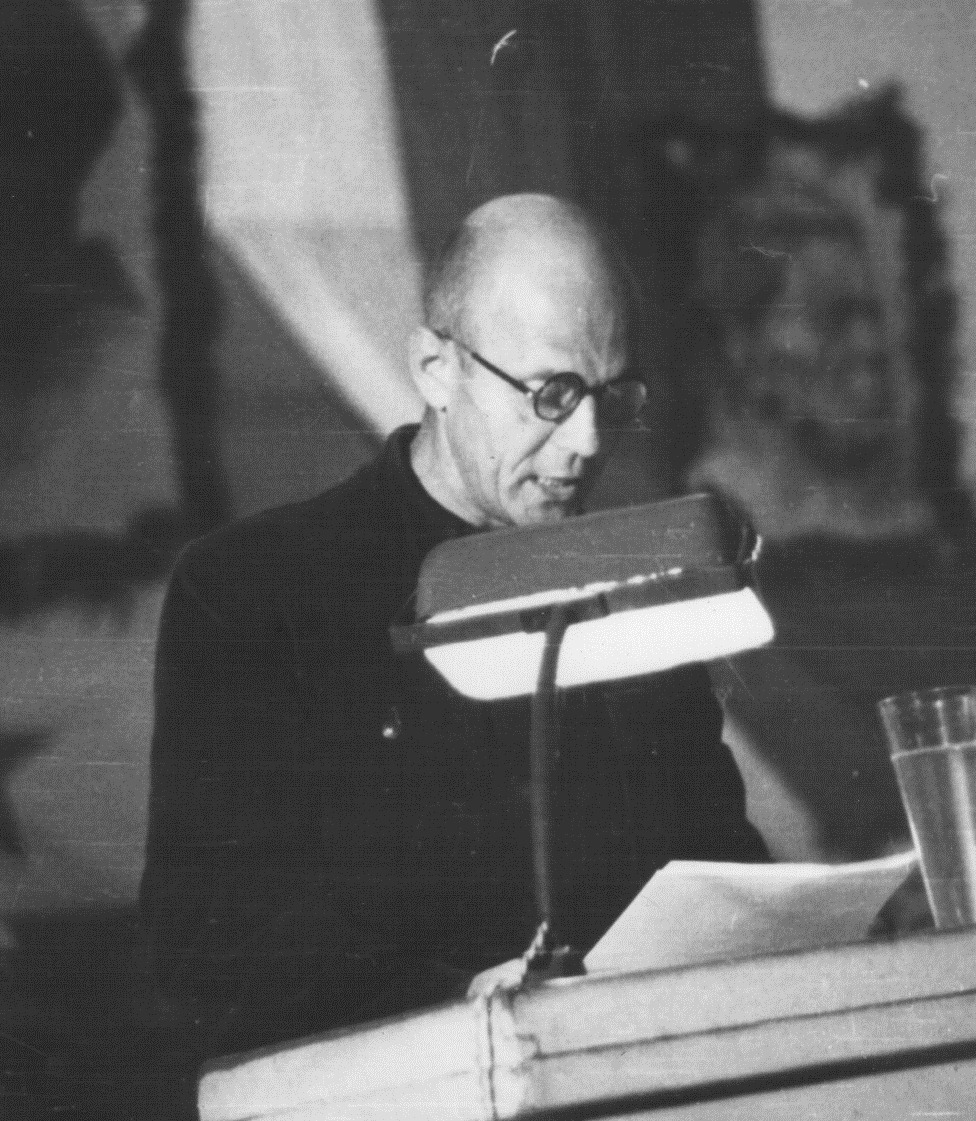

Pavle Gregorić (18 October 1892 – 23 March 1989) was a Croatian communist revolutionary and politician who served as the Minister for Croatia in the government of the Democratic Federative Republic of Yugoslavia from 7 March 1945 to 14 April 1945.

== See also ==
- Prime Minister of Croatia
