= Antonije Đurić =

Serbian journalist (1929–2020)

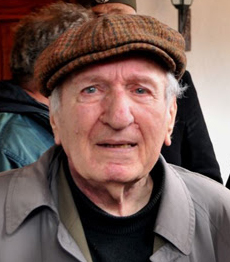
- Born: 21 January 1929; Sjenica, Kingdom of Serbs, Croats and Slovenes
- Died: 15 August 2020 (aged 91); Čačak, Serbia
- Education: Užice Gymnasium
- Occupations: Journalist, author, historian and publicist

Antonije Đurić (Serbian Cyrillic: Антоније Ђурић; 21 January 1929 – 15 August 2020) was a Serbian journalist, author, historian and publicist.

== Biography ==
He finished high school in Užice at the Užice Gymnasium. For writing against the Communist regime, he was imprisoned for seven years in the Sremska Mitrovica Prison at the same time as Stevan Moljević, who died in prison, Đuro Đurović, Vojin Andrić, Kosta Kumanudi, Dragić Joksimović, who also died in prison, Fr. Sava Banković and Borislav Pekić.

After his release from prison, he spent most of his working life working as a journalist for Ekspres politika.

Based on his cult drama Solunci govore, a television film of the same name was made in 1990, and he was the screenwriter of the film. He was a member of the Association of Writers of Serbia. He had a regular monthly column in the newspaper Srbija from Canada and worked as a contributor of Srpske novine from Chicago.

Antonije Đurić lived and worked in Čačak, where he died on August 15, 2020.

== Published books ==
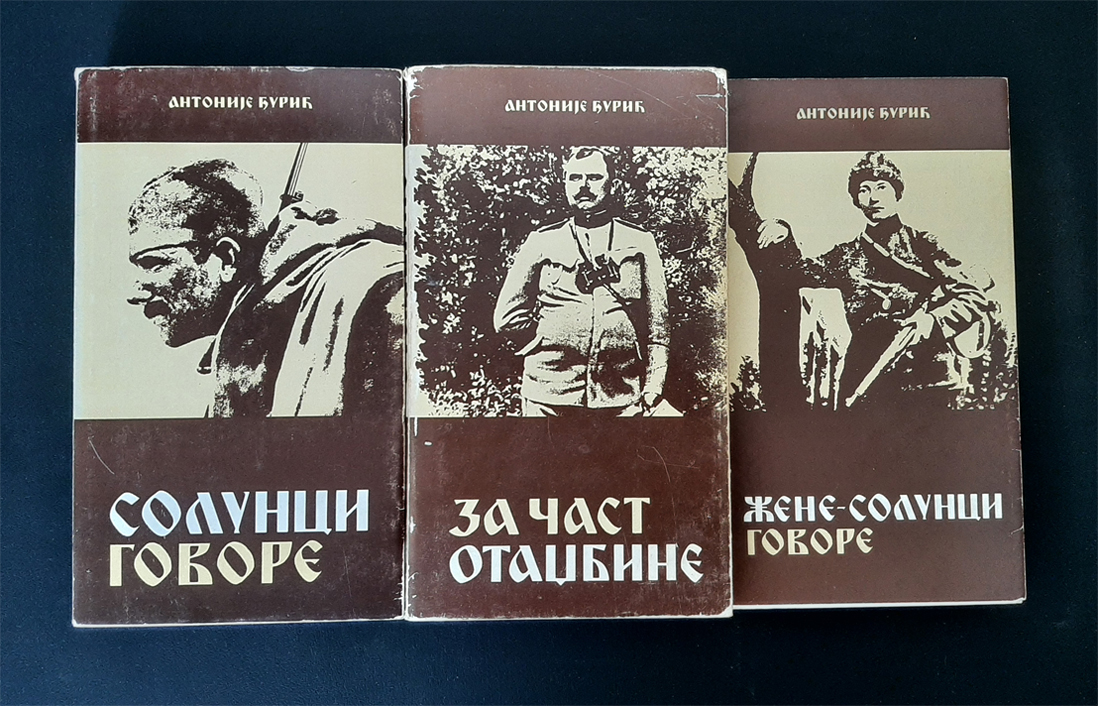
The books Solunci govore, Za čast otadžbine and Žene-Solunci govore

- Solunci govore (1982)
- Kraj morave dolina nade (1983)
- Za čast otadžbine (1985)
- Žene-Solunci govore (1987)
- Obaveštajac kaplar Miloje (1990)
- Po zapovesti Srbije (1994)
- Ravnogorci govore (1996)
- Crvena kuga trilogy (2016)
- Juriš u porobljenu otadžbinu (2016)
- Toplički ustanak (2017)
