= Ba Congress =

1944 Chetnik congress in Serbia

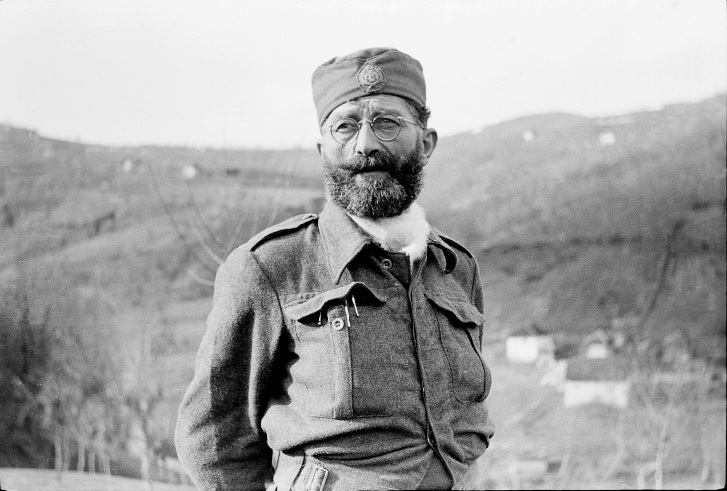
The Ba Congress was called by the Chetnik leader Draža Mihailović.

The Ba Congress, also known as the Saint Sava Congress (Note: Serbian: Светосавски конгрес, Svetosavski kongres) or Great People's Congress, was a meeting of representatives of Draža Mihailović's Chetnik movement held between 25 and 28 January 1944 in the village of Ba in the German-occupied territory of Serbia during World War II. It sought to provide a political alternative to the plans for post-war Yugoslavia set out by the Chetniks' rivals, the communist-led Yugoslav Partisans, and attempted to reverse the decision of the major Allied powers to provide their exclusive support to the Yugoslav Partisans while withdrawing their support of the Chetniks.

The Partisan plan had been set out in the November 1943 Second Session of the communist-led Anti-Fascist Council for the National Liberation of Yugoslavia (AVNOJ). While the Chetnik movement and Mihailović had been working towards a return to the Serb-dominated, monarchist Yugoslavia of the interwar period, AVNOJ had resolved that post-war Yugoslavia would be a federal republic with six equal, constituent republics, and denied the right of King Peter II to return from exile before a popular referendum to determine the future of his rule. AVNOJ had further asserted that it was the sole legitimate government of Yugoslavia.

By the time of the Ba Congress, large parts of the Chetnik movement had been drawn into collaboration with the occupying forces. The British, who had primacy regarding Allied policy in Yugoslavia, had originally supported the Chetniks, but, by December 1943, had concluded that the Chetniks were more interested in collaborating with the Axis against the Partisans than in fighting the Axis. As a test, they asked Mihailović to attack two specific bridges on the Belgrade-to-Salonika railway line, which never happened. At the Tehran Conference of November – December 1943, the major Allies agreed to change support to the Partisans. However, the Partisans had not gained entry to the German-occupied territory of Serbia, and combined with a November armistice the Chetniks had with the Germans (and likely with their tacit support for the congress), the Chetniks planned the Ba Congress as a political gesture aimed at addressing the resolutions of AVNOJ, providing an alternative political vision for post-war Yugoslavia, and as a means of changing the minds of the Allies – but particularly the US – about the decisions of the Tehran Conference that withdrew support for the Chetnik movement.

The congress opened on 25 January 1944, with the pre-war leader of the small Socialist Party, Živko Topalović, as its chairman. The congress denounced the AVNOJ as "the work of the Ustasha-Communist minority", continuing an existing propaganda campaign which claimed that the Partisans and Ustashas had united to exterminate the Serbs. It also provided its full support to King Peter II and the Yugoslav government-in-exile, and re-asserted the Chetnik movement's opposition to the Germans and their allies. It further resolved to mobilise all anti-communist Serbs to fight for the survival of Serbdom. It founded a new political party, the Yugoslav Democratic National Union (JDNZ), in an effort to unite all the elements of the Chetnik movement. Lastly, it proposed its own vision for the political and socio-economic future of Yugoslavia. This political framework included a Serb sovereign and a tripartite federal state, with entities for the Serbs, Croats and Slovenes only, with the Serb unit being dominant, much in the style of the Serbian nationalist and irredentist idea of Greater Serbia. However, while the congress resulted in a short period of reduced collaboration with the Germans and the forces of the puppet Government of National Salvation in the German-occupied territory of Serbia, at this stage of the war, and with the change in Allied policy towards the Chetniks, there was nothing that could be done to improve the position of the movement. Mihailović was dropped as a minister of the government-in-exile soon after, and the Chetnik situation continued to deteriorate, with their continuing tentative collaboration with the Germans playing into the hands of Partisans.

== Background ==
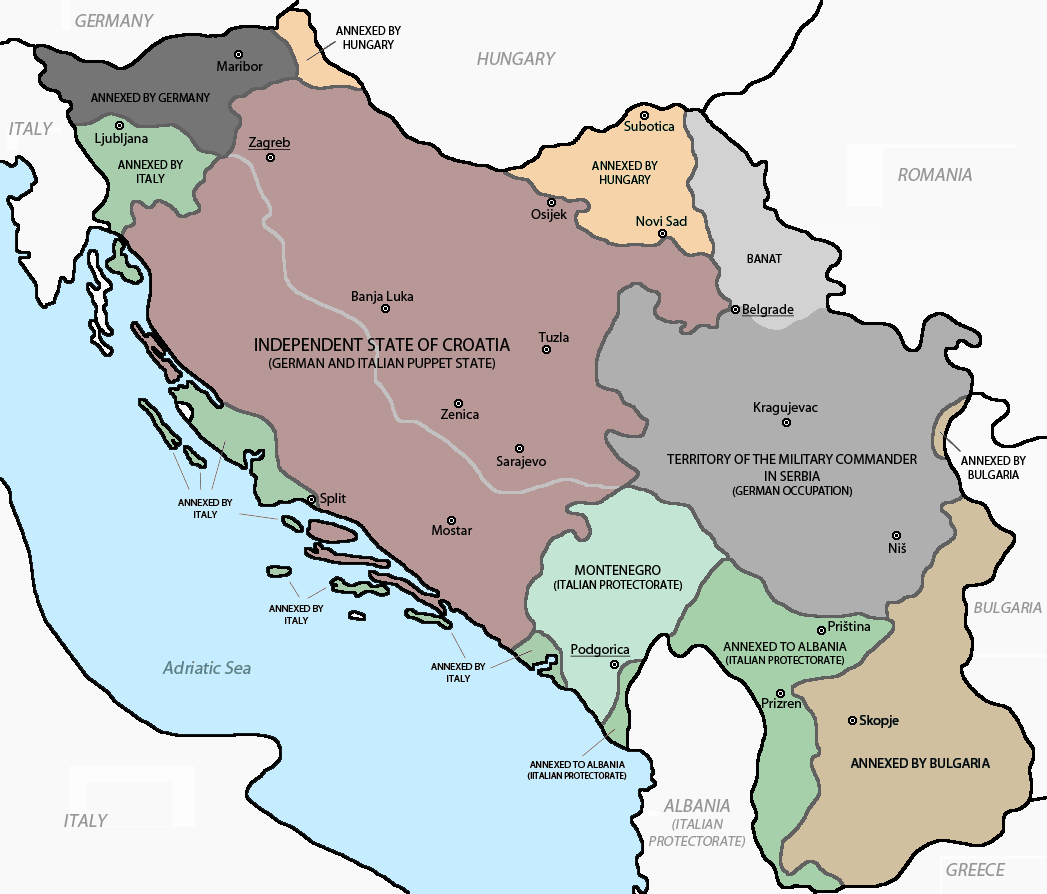
Map showing the occupation zones and partition of Yugoslavia, 1941–1943. The dark and light grey areas on the eastern border show the extent of the German-occupied territory of Serbia.

In April 1941, the Kingdom of Yugoslavia was drawn into World War II when Germany and its allies invaded and occupied the country, which was then partitioned. Some Yugoslav territory was annexed by its Axis neighbours: Hungary, Bulgaria and Italy. The Germans engineered and supported the creation of the Independent State of Croatia (Croatian: Nezavisna Država Hrvatska, NDH), a puppet state led by the fascist Ustaša – Croatian Revolutionary Movement. The NDH comprised all of modern-day Croatia and Bosnia and Herzegovina and some adjacent territory. Before the defeat, King Peter II and his government went into exile, reforming in June as the Western Allied-recognised Yugoslav government-in-exile in London.

Two resistance movements soon emerged in occupied Yugoslavia: the almost exclusively ethnic Serb and monarchist Chetniks, led by Draža Mihailović; and the multi-ethnic and communist-led Partisans, under Josip Broz Tito. The approaches of the two resistance movements differed in important respects from the beginning. The Chetniks under Mihailović advocated a "wait-and-see" strategy of building up an organisation for a struggle which was to commence when the Western Allies arrived in Yugoslavia, thereby limiting losses in military and civilian personnel alike until the final phase of the war. On the other hand, the Partisans were implacably opposed to the Axis occupation and resisted consistently from the beginning. The Chetnik political agenda was a return to the Serb-dominated Yugoslavia of the interwar period, whereas the Partisans strove to create a social revolution in a multi-ethnic but communist-dominated Yugoslavia. During the early years of the war, the Chetniks failed to articulate or promote a strong political agenda. According to the historian and political scientist Kirk Ford, it is possible that Mihailović believed that he did not need to do so, as he had been a representative of the government-in-exile since January 1942.

In different parts of the country the Chetnik movement was progressively drawn into collaboration agreements. First, with the forces of the puppet Government of National Salvation in the German-occupied territory of Serbia, then with the Italians in occupied Dalmatia and Montenegro, next with some of the Ustasha forces in the northern Bosnia region of the NDH, and, after the Italian capitulation in September 1943, with the Germans directly. On 29 October 1943, Adolf Hitler authorised German headquarters to utilise "national anti-Communist forces" to fight insurgencies in southeastern Europe. By the end of the year, due to a drift towards collaboration, the Government of National Salvation and the Germans were at least as influential over the Chetnik movement in the German-occupied territory of Serbia as Mihailović, who was becoming increasingly isolated.

== Prelude ==
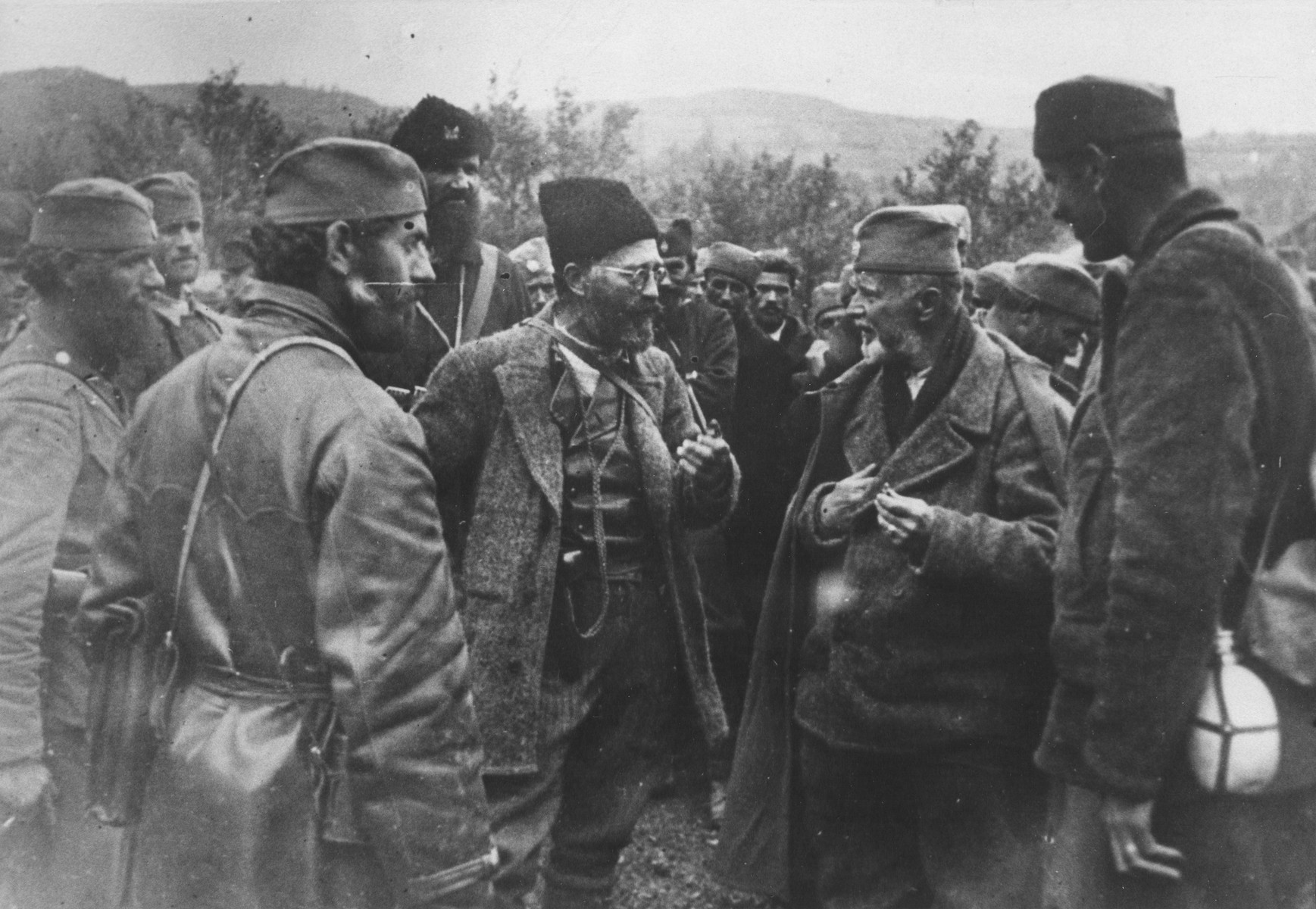
Mihailović (centre with glasses) confers with his political adviser Dragiša Vasić (second from right) and others

By mid-1943, Mihailović had realised that he needed to broaden the political appeal of the Chetnik movement. Reverses in Montenegro and Herzegovina had shown that the Chetnik political ideology was producing unsatisfactory results with the populace, and the Western Allies were concerned that the Chetnik movement was anti-democratic, or possibly even fascist. The veneer of democracy advanced by the Partisans was appealing to the Western Allies, and Mihailović was concerned that the support he was receiving would shift to them. In order to widen the base of the Chetnik movement, Mihailović contacted representatives of the pre-war political parties living in Belgrade. He assured them that the former illiberal approach of the movement, as advocated by his close political advisers, the former republican and Black Hand adherent Dragiša Vasić and the Chetnik ideologue Stevan Moljević, had been replaced with a commitment to democracy. The politicians responded to Mihailović's approach positively as they were concerned about the outcome of the war, and neither a communist nor Chetnik military dictatorship appealed to them.

According to the historian Lucien Karchmar, the politician that appears to have taken the primary role in these negotiations was the leader of the small pre-war Socialist Party, Živko Topalović. Topalović contacted members of the pre-war United Opposition, such as the leader of the Independent Democratic Party, Adam Pribićević, and the leader of the People's Radical Party, Aca Stanojević. Both Pribićević and Stanojević were only the nominal leaders of their respective parties, as the real decision-makers in their parties were with the government-in-exile in London. The political parties agreed that they would negotiate with Mihailović as a group. Each party nominated two delegates to a coordinating council, and the council selected four negotiators, led by Topalović, who were to work out the details of an agreement with the Chetnik leader. These negotiations dragged on, and there was one break of two months between discussions. On the Chetnik side, Moljević and his supporters suggested that the politicians join the Chetnik movement, which they considered apolitical, but the politicians refused to be absorbed in this way. Instead, they demanded a new political grouping be formed, of which the Chetnik movement would be just one part, and that this new grouping would lay out a new program for the future. Further demands were for a reaffirmation of the Yugoslav idea, a parliamentary system and social reforms, a federally organised country, improved relationships with the British, and a new attempt at reconciliation with the Partisans, preferably with the help of the Allies.

Some of Mihailović's followers were against agreeing to the politicians' demands. Nevertheless, the Chetnik leader accepted them, but with the proviso that the politicians firmly commit to the agreement. The politicians were loath to do this, as if they signed any document it could be used against them by the Germans, forcing them to leave Belgrade and join Mihailović in the field. The next step was a proposal to convoke a congress to ratify the new political structure and announce the new program. Mihailović advanced the date of 1 December, which was the anniversary of the founding of the Kingdom of Serbs, Croats and Slovenes (Kingdom of Yugoslavia since 1929) in 1918, but the politicians delayed the preparations as they continued to negotiate and hesitate.

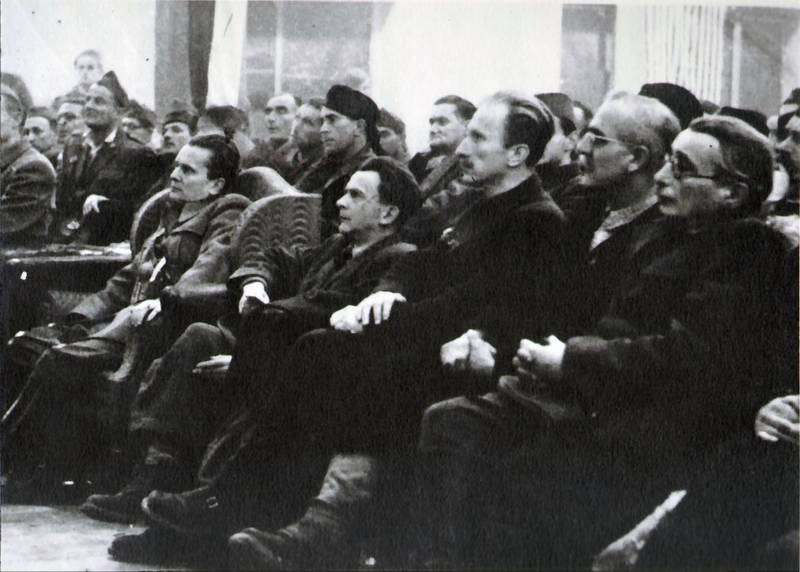
The Second Session of AVNOJ posed a serious political threat to the Chetniks. Pictured at Jajce (seated from left) Josip Broz Tito, Josip Vidmar, Edvard Kocbek, Josip Rus and Moša Pijade

When it was finally held, the Ba Congress, also known as the Saint Sava Congress (Note: Saint Sava is the patron saint of Serbs, and his saint day is 27 January.) or Great People's Congress, was conducted in the shadow of two threats, which affected both the Chetniks and the leaders of the political parties in pre-war Yugoslavia who now supported them. The first of these was that the Partisans had widened their appeal by advancing the idea of unity among Yugoslav peoples as free and equal members of the country. This had attracted many people to their cause. This approach was formalised by the resolution of the Second Session of the Anti-Fascist Council for the National Liberation of Yugoslavia (Serbo-Croatian: Antifašističko vijeće narodnog oslobođenja Jugoslavije, AVNOJ) in the Bosnian town of Jajce in November 1943, which decided to create a federal Yugoslavia, based on six constituent republics with equal rights, Bosnia and Herzegovina, Croatia, Macedonia, Montenegro, Serbia, and Slovenia. Along with this resolution, AVNOJ asserted that it was the sole legitimate government of Yugoslavia, and denied the right of King Peter to return from exile before a popular referendum to determine the future of his rule. The Western Allies expressed no opposition to the resolutions of AVNOJ, and at the Tehran Conference of 28 November to 1 December, the Allies had agreed to throw their support behind the Partisans.

The second threat to the Chetniks and their political allies was that from mid-1943, the British, who had primacy regarding Allied policy in Yugoslavia, had begun to doubt their decision to support Mihailović. By December they had concluded that Mihailović's Chetniks were more interested in collaborating with the Axis against the Partisans than in fighting the Axis. On 8 December 1943, in the wake of the Tehran Conference decision, the British Commander-in-Chief of the Middle East, General Henry Maitland Wilson, had sent a message to Mihailović asking him to attack two specific bridges on the Belgrade to Salonika railway line. This message was a test formulated by the British to assess Mihailović's intentions regarding resisting the Germans, and was done with the expectation that he would continue his inactivity against the Germans and not comply. The chief of the British Special Operations Executive (SOE) mission to the Chetniks, Brigadier Charles Armstrong, followed this up with written orders on 16 December, directing Mihailović to carry out the sabotage on the two bridges by 29 December. The attacks were never carried out.

In late 1943, the Partisans, who had enjoyed considerable success in the rest of Yugoslavia in the wake of the September capitulation of the Italians, had been stymied in an attempt to break into the German-occupied territory of Serbia from the neighbouring occupied territories of Montenegro, Sandžak and eastern Bosnia. The German-led operation that stopped the Partisan incursion, Operation Kugelblitz, included Bulgarian and collaborating Chetnik units. While unsuccessful in destroying the targeted Partisan formations, it did delay their entry into Serbian territory. The Chetniks took advantage of this respite, bolstered by the relative protection afforded by armistice agreements they had made with the Germans in November. This situation allowed the Chetniks to convoke the Ba Congress as a striking political gesture aimed at addressing the resolutions of AVNOJ and providing an alternative political vision for post-war Yugoslavia. It was also conceived as a means of changing the minds of the Allies – but particularly the US – about the decisions of the Tehran Conference that withdrew support for the Chetnik movement. Another aim was to broaden political support for the movement through a program that, while remaining fiercely anti-communist, had enough democratic elements to have widespread support among the population.

== Participants ==
The congress was organised by Mihailović and occurred between 25 and 28 January 1944 in the village of Ba, near Valjevo in the German-occupied territory of Serbia. Approximately 300 civilians participated, almost all of whom were Serbs from Serbia, Montenegro and Bosnia together with two or three Croats, one Slovene and one Bosnian Muslim. The non-Serb representation was effectively tokenistic. Delegates from Herzegovina and Dalmatia were unable to attend in time. The delegates attending included principal Chetnik commanders, politicians who had joined the Chetnik cause at the beginning, such as Vasić and Moljević, representatives of old Serb political parties who had decided to join with the Chetniks later on and others. The politicians included Topalović and Pribićević. Virtually all of the pre-war political parties were represented in some way, excluding the communists and fascist-aligned groups. The congress was unique during the war, in that it was the only gathering which included the main Chetnik commanders and closely aligned politicians as well as Chetnik supporters among the pre-war political parties.

The Chetnik old guard were originally opposed to the involvement of the recently aligned pre-war politicians, and according to Mihailović they were only included at his insistence. Mihailović was also opposed to Vasić having a significant role in the congress, because he and Vasić were now regularly on opposing sides in discussions. Vasić was only included at Topalović's urging. A significant number of the younger Chetnik leaders considered the pre-war politicians to be of poor quality and character, and obstacles to political, social and economic reforms after the war. Given that the Germans could easily have prevented it from occurring or disrupted it once underway, it has been argued by the historians Jozo Tomasevich and Marko Attila Hoare that the congress was held with the tacit approval of the Germans.

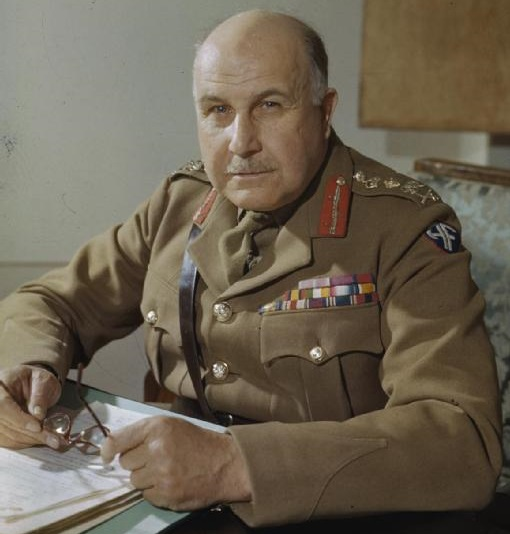
Mihailović did not comply with a request from British General Henry Maitland Wilson (pictured) to attack railway bridges

The congress was also attended by Lieutenant George Musulin, one of the American Office of Strategic Services (OSS) officers attached to the British mission to Mihailović, largely at his own initiative. He was the only Allied representative who attended. Armstrong refused to participate in the congress because of the Chetnik failure to carry out the sabotage operations ordered by Wilson and himself. British Prime Minister Winston Churchill used Mihailović's refusal as an opportunity to tell King Peter about the Tehran Conference decision that the Allies would be backing Tito exclusively, and that Mihailović might have to be dismissed as a minister in the government-in-exile.

== Discussions ==
The night before the congress, Moljević and the long-term Chetnik supporters verbally clashed with Topalović and the politicians, but Mihailović decided in favour of the latter. Mihailović made a personal address to the congress, pledging his loyalty to the king, to the rule of law and to Yugoslavia, and repeatedly denied he had any tendencies towards dictatorship. He also rejected the idea of taking collective revenge against any nationality or political faction for crimes committed during the war. He forcefully refused to join the drift into collaboration with the Germans affecting much of the Chetnik movement at the time of the congress, but his repeated denials about plans for a military dictatorship indicate an understandable lack of confidence from the politicians in this regard. Mihailović was not overtly involved in the following discussions. During the congress there were frequent anti-German outbursts from congress participants.

In common with political practice under the period of royal dictatorship from 1929, the congress formed a new political party, the Yugoslav Democratic National Union (Serbo-Croatian: Jugoslavenska demokratska narodna zajednica, JDNZ), and Topalović was appointed as its chairman. Despite the very small size of the Socialist Party before the war, Topalović was apparently chosen due to his links with two Labour Party members of the Churchill war ministry, Clement Attlee and Ernest Bevin. The committee established for the new party included a large number of Serbs and Montenegrins, as well as three Croats – Vladimir Predavec, Đuro Vilović, and Niko Bartulović. It also included a Slovenian refugee, Anton Krejći, and a Bosnian Muslim, Mustafa Mulalić. Among the non-Serbs, only Mulalić was a pre-war politician, from the Yugoslav National Party. Topalović's election was a victory for the moderates among the delegates, and constituted a setback for the Greater Serbia extremists such as Vasić and Moljević, who had dominated the Chetnik political program up to this point.

Views on the character of the congress varied between those with long-standing ties to the Chetnik movement, and those pre-war politicians that had only recently come to support it. Both groups believed they had an equal stake in the future of Yugoslavia. The Chetniks saw the JDNZ as the expanded political wing of Mihailović's movement, with Mihailović to retain all military and political power, whereas Topalović saw the Chetniks as the military arm under the primacy of the new party. It quickly became clear that the two sides could not easily agree on even procedural matters, let alone on final resolutions. Moljević was also opposed to the creation of the JDNZ, and only wanted an expansion of the existing Chetnik Central Committee, of which he was a long-standing member. During the congress, the assembled representatives sent a message of solidarity to the Soviet Union and Joseph Stalin. Despite the close relationship between the Partisans and the Soviets, this message is explained by the fact that neither the Chetniks nor the government-in-exile had taken an anti-Soviet stance during the war, and Mihailović also thought that the approaching Red Army would appreciate assistance from the Chetniks in forcing the Germans from the occupied territory of Serbia.

== Resolutions ==
After three days of debate, the congress made resolutions regarding both military and political matters. Firstly, it denounced the decisions of AVNOJ as "the work of the Ustasha-Communist minority", in accordance with the existing Chetnik propaganda that the Partisans and the Ustashas had united to exterminate Serbs. It also provided its full support to the Yugoslav government-in-exile, the Chetniks, and Mihailović's military leadership, claiming that Mihailović's Chetniks were a truly national army. It re-asserted the Chetnik movement's opposition to Germany and its allies, and resolved to mobilise all anti-communist Serbs to fight for the survival of Serbdom. Lastly, it proposed its own vision for the political and socio-economic future of Yugoslavia.

The congress denounced AVNOJ's change to the constitutional organization of Yugoslavia, called on the Partisans to abandon political actions until the end of the war, and adopted a high-minded but somewhat imprecise resolution known as the Ba Resolution (Serbo-Croatian: Baška rezolucija). The principal document was called The Goals of the Ravna Gora Movement and came in two parts. "Ravna Gora Movement" in the title referred to Ravna Gora, the place where Mihailović's Chetniks first established themselves after the invasion, and is an alternative name for Mihailović's Chetnik movement. The first part, The Yugoslav Goals of the Ravna Gora Movement stated that:

- a restored and enlarged Yugoslavia would be a national state of the Serbs, Croats and Slovenes;
- national minorities who were enemies of Yugoslavia and the Serbs, Croats and Slovenes would be expelled from Yugoslav territory;
- Yugoslavia would be organised on a democratic basis as a federation consisting of three units, Serbia, Croatia and Slovenia; and
- all three peoples of Yugoslavia would organise their own internal affairs as their representatives chose.

The second part, The Serbian Goals of the Ravna Gora Movement stated that all Serbian provinces would be united in the Serbian unit within the federal arrangement, based on the solidarity between all Serb regions of Yugoslavia, under a unicameral parliament. The congress also resolved that Yugoslavia should be a constitutional monarchy headed by a Serb sovereign. Further, the congress resolved that it would not form a government as AVNOJ had done, and called upon the Partisans to follow a democratic process. Topalović had proposed that Bosnia should be a fourth federal unit, but this was opposed by Vasić and Moljević, because they saw the Bosnian Krajina as forming an integral part of the Serbian federal unit.

According to the historians Radovan Samardžić and Milan Duškov, the main principle of the programme of the Ba Congress was social-democratic Yugoslavism. They claim the resolutions of the Ba Congress were "better founded, culturally and historically" than the framework proposed by AVNOJ. The congress marked a change in the Chetnik main political objective; instead of their earlier aim to restore the centralised pre-war kingdom, they changed their approach towards a federal state structure with a dominant Serb federal unit.

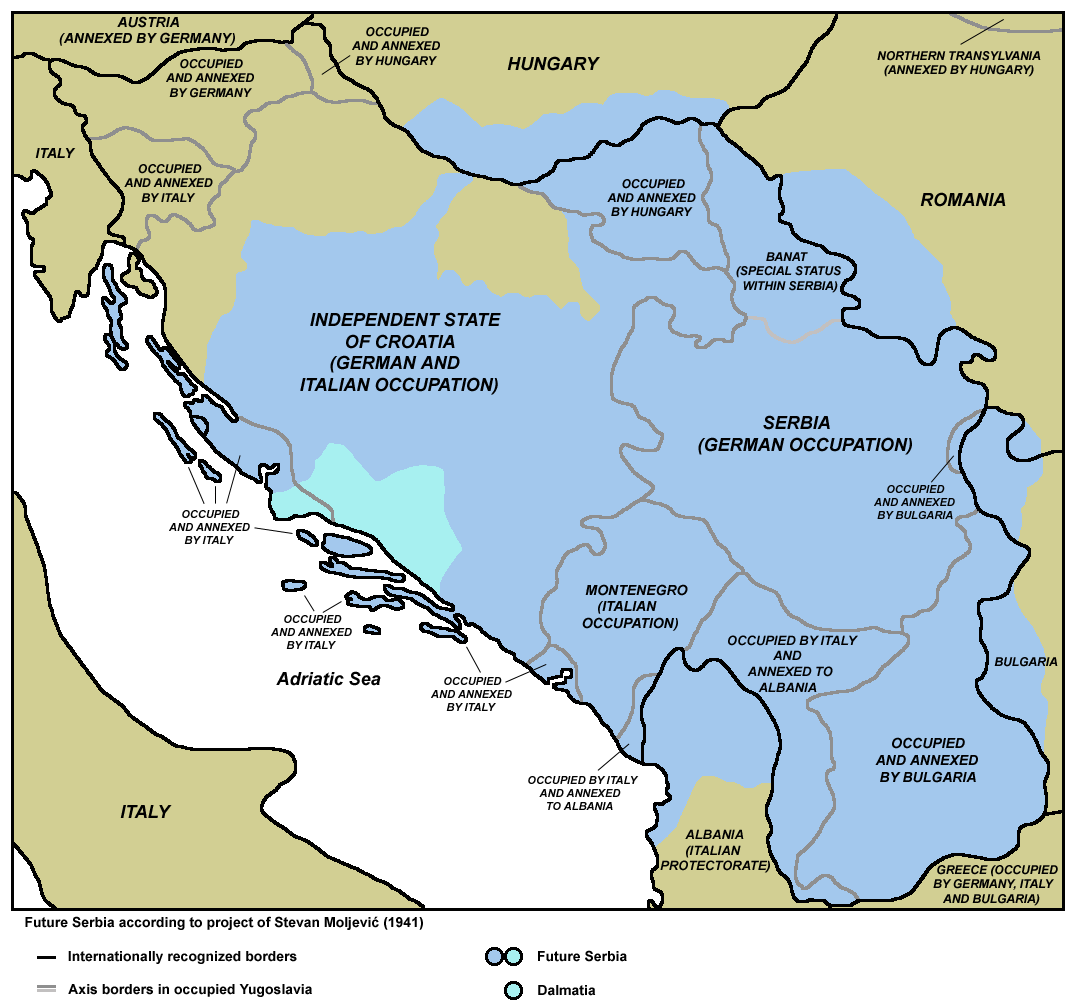
A map showing the extent of Greater Serbia (in blue) as envisaged by Moljević in Homogeneous Serbia

By agreeing to the resolutions of the congress, the Chetnik leadership sought to undermine Partisan accusations that they were dedicated to a return to pre-war Serb hegemony and a Greater Serbia. Tomasevich observes that in asserting the need to gather all Serbs into a single entity, The Serbian Goals of the Ravna Gora Movement was reminiscent of Homogeneous Serbia, written by Moljević several years earlier, which advocated a Greater Serbia. He also notes that the congress did not recognise Macedonia and Montenegro as separate nations, and also implied that Croatia and Slovenia would effectively be appendages to the Serbian entity. The net effect of this, according to Tomasevich, was that the country would not only return to the same Serb-dominated state it had been in during the interwar period, but would be worse than that, particularly for the Croats. He concludes that this outcome was to be expected given the overwhelmingly Serb makeup of the congress. Hoare agrees that despite its superficial Yugoslavism, the congress had clear Greater Serbia inclinations, and the historian Lucien Karchmar concludes that the usage of the term "Saint Sava Congress" reinforced the impression that it was focussed on the aspirations of Serbs rather than Yugoslavs in general.

In terms of the socio-economic future of Yugoslavia, the congress expressed an interest in reforming the economic, social, and cultural position of the country, particularly regarding democratic ideals. This was a significant departure from previous Chetnik goals expressed earlier in the war, especially in terms of promoting democratic principles with some socialist features. Tomasevich observes that these new goals were probably more related to achieving propaganda objectives than reflecting actual intentions, given that there was no real interest in considering the needs of the non-Serb peoples of Yugoslavia. It seems unlikely that the Chetnik movement was fully aware of the radicalised mood amongst the general population.

The most important practical outcome of the congress was the creation of the JDNZ, because all of the representatives present agreed to avoid independent political action until conditions in Yugoslavia were normalised. The existing Chetnik Central National Committee was to be expanded to include representatives of all those that participated in the congress. The selection of the new Central National Committee members was delegated to an "organisational committee of three", comprising Topalović, Vasić and Moljević, who were to consult with the various leaders. The outcomes of the congress meant that Mihailović now had the endorsement of the People's Radical Party, the Democratic Party, the Independent Democratic Party, the Agrarian Party, the Socialist Party and the Republican Party. According to Karchmar, claims by Chetnik adherents that this aspect of the Ba Congress demonstrated "overwhelming popular support" for Mihailović are seriously flawed, as they fail to recognise that the pre-war Yugoslav political parties were not mass-membership organisations, and support from the leaders in no way assured support from those that voted for the various parties in the most recent election in 1938. The participants also hoped that the resolutions would restore the Chetnik relationship with the Western Allies, particularly the Churchill government and British public.

== Aftermath ==
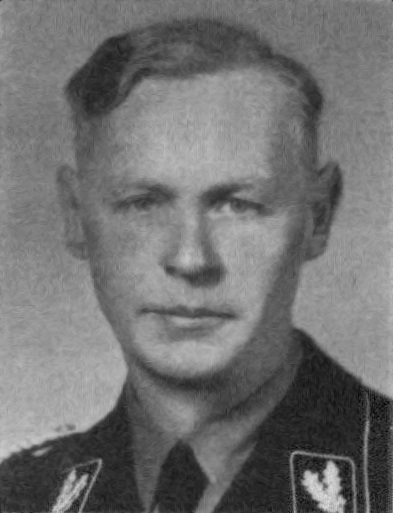
SS-Gruppenführer and Generalleutnant der Polizei August Meyszner received detailed reports on the congress

Having not attended the congress, the British had no first-hand intelligence about the discussions. Only in April did the SOE contact Musulin and ask for a report. Having received it, the British were hesitant to accept the new political program on its face value. Assessing that Mihailović's situation was increasingly desperate, they were not keen to enable a late attempt to save what they already thought was a lost cause. Topalović later acknowledged that the congress was not as "imposing nor as grand as its own propaganda and the publicity given to it by its friends made it appear to be". In May, the British mission to Mihailović was withdrawn. The following month, Mihailović was dropped as a minister in the Yugoslav government-in-exile, removing his legitimacy. From this point, he treated the government-in-exile as his enemy, and had to go on alone.

The Germans were very interested in the congress, and German agents provided a detailed account of it to the Higher SS and Police Leader in the German-occupied territory of Serbia, SS-Gruppenführer and Generalleutnant der Polizei, (Note: Equivalent to a U.S. Army major general) August Meyszner. These reports mentioned the frequent anti-German outbursts that had occurred. The Germans were concerned about the outcomes of the congress, and they may have had some limited consequences in military terms, as the formal armistice agreements between the Germans and Chetniks ended soon after the congress. In practical terms, despite Mihailović's opposition to the slide towards collaboration, co-operation still continued, forced by the deteriorating situation for the Germans and their collaborators in the occupied territory. The congress was followed by a significant deterioration in the relationships between the Chetnik movement and the collaborationist formations of the Government of National Salvation in occupied Serbia, led by Milan Nedić. The Yugoslav government-in-exile reported at the beginning of March 1944 that in response to the congress, the Gestapo and Serbian puppet government arrested 798 people in Belgrade and held them in prison as hostages, threatening to shoot 100 of them for each German soldier killed in Serbia. A number of Mihailović supporters, including some of the politicians, were rounded up by the Germans as part of this sweep, and at least one politician was executed. A number of the politicians who had accepted positions on the new Central National Committee were forced to flee and seek Mihailović's protection.

During the congress, Mihailović mentioned to Musulin that Chetniks had picked up some American aircrew who had crashed near Niš in southeastern Serbia. Musulin saw this as an opportunity to extend his stay with the Chetniks, and once they arrived at Chetnik headquarters, Musulin contacted OSS Cairo to obtain approval to enlist Chetnik assistance to evacuate them from occupied territory. On 6 March, he received approval to take this action. Musulin was supposed to depart on the flight that extracted the aircrew, but delayed his departure due to illness, but also because he wished to stay with the Chetniks and gather intelligence. On 20 May, he asked approval from OSS Cairo to remain, but this was denied, and he was extracted to Italy on 28 May with the rest of the British mission to the Chetniks. A new OSS mission, Operation Halyard, arrived in August to utilise Chetnik assistance in evacuating downed fliers from occupied Serbia. Musulin was initially the leader of the Operation Halyard team.

When he departed in May, Musulin was accompanied by Topalović, who led a diplomatic mission on behalf of Mihailović to try to reverse the Allied decision to abandon the Chetniks. This effort was abortive, as the British did not allow him to leave Italy and would not reconsider their policy of supporting Tito and the Partisans. Topalović was replaced as chairman of the Central National Committee by Mihailo Kujundžić, who had a heart attack and died soon after. He was replaced by Moljević. The new chairman had never reconciled himself with the new political structure, and railed against it, especially as it failed to garner results for the Chetnik movement. There remained a significant gap between those who had embraced the new political structure and those that adhered to the original Chetnik ideology, and this divide was carried over into the post-war émigré diaspora. Regardless of the return of Moljević to the fold, the pre-war politicians remained in evidence, and came into the field to join Mihailović.

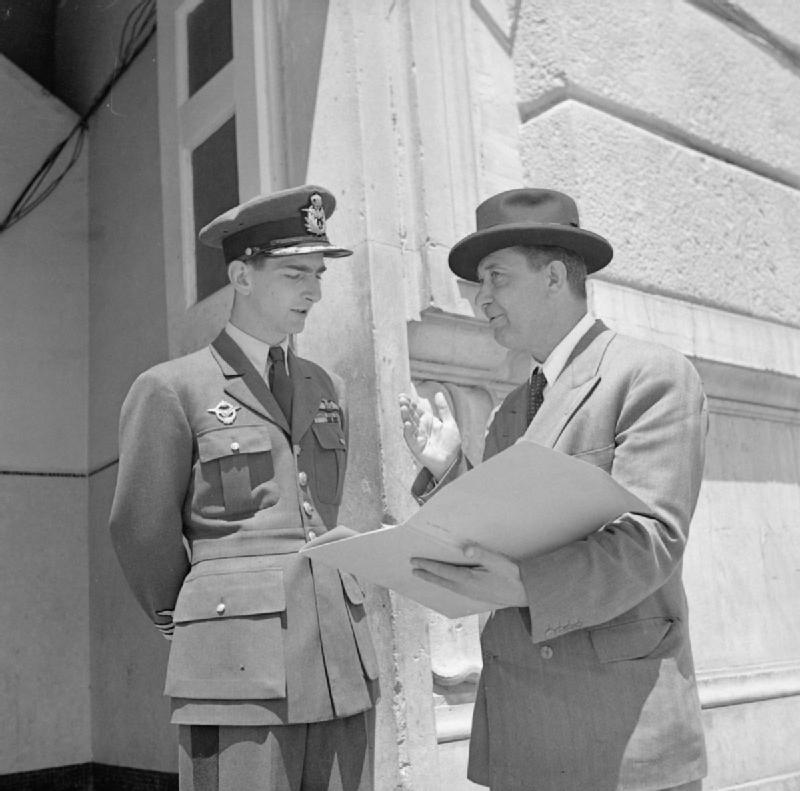
King Peter (left in uniform) and Ivan Šubašić in Italy in June 1944

The central committee of the JDNZ had been selected by June, consisting of six members, one each for foreign affairs, legislative affairs, economic and fiscal affairs, nationality questions and propaganda, social affairs, and economic construction. The central committee condemned the new government-in-exile led by Ivan Šubašić, calling its members communist sympathisers and Croat separatists. It also appointed special representatives for the Chetnik movement overseas, including Konstantin Fotić in the United States, Jovan Đonović in Algiers, Bogoljub Jevtić in the UK, General Petar Živković in Italy, and Mladen Žujović in Egypt.

Within the German-occupied territory of Serbia at least, the Chetnik movement took action to implement the resolutions of the congress. Corps commanders were ordered to modify the administrative arrangements in their areas of responsibility, and new "Ravna Gora committees" were established in each district and village to replace the existing administration. New district commanders were appointed, assisted by treasurers and quartermasters. The decrees of the expanded Central National Committee were made binding on all Ravna Gora committees and Chetnik district commanders, and they were only to take orders from the Executive Committee of the Central National Committee, which was also responsible for all propaganda. The Chetniks took over large parts of occupied Serbia outside the towns, pushing the administration of the Nedić government into the margins.

The central committee met again over the period 20–23 July, stating that it considered the Šubašić government incapable of protecting the interests of Yugoslavia and the king, and reserving the right to take whatever actions it considered necessary to look after Yugoslavia's interests. It was clear that Mihailović did not accept his removal from his position as a minister in the government in June. When he was dismissed as chief of staff of the Supreme Command in August, he also did not accept this, and continued to refer to the Chetniks as the "Yugoslav Army in the Homeland", with himself as its chief. The central committee only met twice more between July 1944 and March 1945. In August, several members of the central committee, including Pribićević, Vladimir Belajčić and Ivan Kovač, along with a senior Chetnik commander, Major Zvonimir Vučković, were sent to join Topalović in Italy. Their pleas for a change of policy towards the Chetniks were in vain. Mihailović disestablished the central committee just before he was forced to withdraw from Serbia to northeast Bosnia in mid-September 1944, as he considered that he could only take fighting men with him. Regardless, most of the members of the central committee accompanied him. Eventually, Mihailović and Moljević fell out over the relationship of the Chetnik movement with the Germans, and Moljević resigned and was not replaced. This was the end of the Chetnik political organisation given form at Ba.

Despite being planned well before the Second Session of AVNOJ was held, the Ba Congress was widely seen as a response to it. The congress was by far the most important political event for Mihailović's Chetniks during the war. Regardless of the internal changes wrought by the congress, it did not prevent the Western Allies from breaking off contact with the Chetnik movement, and there was no rapprochement with the Partisans. Given the situation in Yugoslavia in early 1944, combined with the split between the British and Chetniks over the latter's failure to resist the Germans, the congress did nothing to improve the position of the Chetnik movement.

During the balance of 1944, the Chetnik position throughout occupied Yugoslavia continued to deteriorate, as the Germans did not trust them, and tentative agreements between the two provided only limited help against their common enemy, the Partisans. The continued Chetnik collaboration also played into the hands of the Partisans from a propaganda standpoint, and undermined morale within Chetniks ranks as they came to the realisation that the Germans would lose the war. In late 1944, the Partisans, along with the Red Army, entered the occupied territory of Serbia, forcing the Chetniks to withdraw into the Sandžak then the NDH alongside German troops. Finally, many Chetniks retreated towards the western borders of Yugoslavia, hoping to surrender to the Western Allies. Mihailović himself was tricked by the Partisans into thinking an uprising against them was underway in Partisan-held Serbia, and when he tried to return to join it he was captured in early 1946. Interrogated and tried for high treason and war crimes by the new Yugoslav authorities, he was found guilty and executed on 17 July of that year.
