= Central National Committee (Chetniks) =

Central National Committee of the Kingdom of Yugoslavia Централни Национални Комитет Краљевине Југославије

History
- Founded: August or September 1941
- Disbanded: April 1945
- Preceded by: Dragiša Vasić

Leadership
- Vice President: Mustafa Mulalić (since beginning of 1943)
- Secretary of the Executive Board: Đura Đurović

Motto
- For Democracy, Against All Dictatorships

The Central National Committee of the Kingdom of Yugoslavia, also known by its Yugoslav abbreviation CNK (Serbo-Croatian: Централни национални комитет Краљевине Југославије, Centralni nacionalni komitet Kraljevine Jugoslavije), was an advisory body of the Yugoslav Army in the Fatherland (commonly known as the Chetniks) established during WWII in August 1941 by the group of political representatives of all prewar opposition parties.

== Background ==
After the short April War in 1941, Axis forces swiftly occupied and destroyed the Kingdom of Yugoslavia. A small group of Yugoslav officers, led by Draža Mihailović, did not accept the capitulation of the Yugoslav Army and organized resistance in their headquarters at Ravna Gora. As soon as the news about this resistance movement reached Belgrade, many intellectuals and members of non-Communist political parties supported it. This group became the nucleus of CNK, which coordinated their activities with the headquarters.

== Establishment ==
The CNK was established at the end of August 1941 as a consultative body. According to some sources, the CNK was established in September 1941.

The Chetniks established Mountain Staff No. 1 and Central National Committee, forming the ideological substance of the Chetnik movement - For Democracy, Against All Dictatorships - their aim for the war. The CNK was composed of the political representatives of all prewar opposition parties.

Its Executive Board members were Dragiša Vasić, Mladen Mlađa Žujović, and Stevan Moljević. After some time, regional committees were established in Montenegro (Serbo-Croatian: Комитет црногорских националиста, Komitet crnogorskih nacionalista) and in Split. (Serbo-Croatian: Српски национални комитет, Srpski nacionalni komitet) Although they supported Mihajlović, they were not directly subordinated to the CNK.

== Activities ==
The CNK did not have particular importance. Is Executive Board was active for the first two years only. At the beginning of 1943 the CNK was expanded and joined by Aleksandar Aksentijević, Đuro Đurović, Mustafa Mulalić and Đuro Vilović.

The CNK began with resistance to Axis occupying forces.

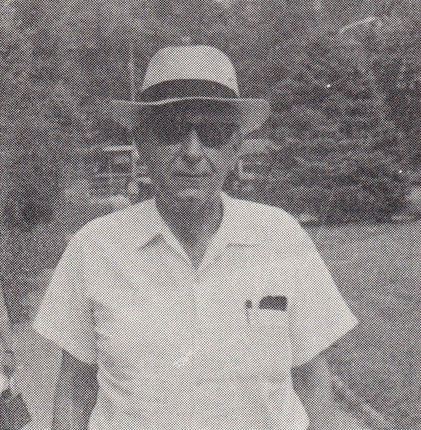
Photo of Đura Đurović, secretary of the Executive Board of CNK and editor of its official organ "Glas Jugoslavije"

According to the decisions of the Ba Congress, the CNK was designated to acquire political responsibility and cooperate with Allies until liberation from Fascists and Communists and with the government of the coming Yugoslav Federation composed of Serbia, Croatia and Slovenia. The vice president of CNK was Mustafa Mulalić. He hoped to collect all Muslim sympathizers of the Yugoslav Federation as projected by the Chetniks.

The official organ of the CNK was Glas Jugoslavije ("Voice of Yugoslavia"), initiated on 10 July 1944. It was edited by the Executive Board of the CNK, mainly by Dr. Đura Đurović who was board's secretary between June and September 1944.

== Final days ==
Facing the entrance of pro-Partisan Communist Red Army troops into Axis occupied Yugoslavia the CNK decided to follow advice from the US to gather their forces in Banja Luka and await the invasion of Allied forces on Dalmatian coast and their infiltration into Bosnia and other parts of Yugoslavia. On 21 February 1945, Pavle Đurišić organized a conference and the group decided to retreat to Slovenia until more a favourable political situation for their national cause was reached, inviting Mihailović and CNK to follow their conclusions. In the absence of a reply from Mihailović, on 1 March 1945 Đurišić organized a new conference of the "National Committee of Higher Military Commanders and Intellectuals from Montenegro, Boka and Old Ras" that reached the same conclusions. Mihailović and CNK rejected decisions of this conference and condemned Đurišić.

Some members of the CNK, including its president Dragiša Vasić, joined Đurišić and began their journey toward Slovenia, contrary to the decisions of Mihailović. After the Battle of Lijevče Field they were all captured and together with Đurišić and other captured Chetnik officers taken to Jasenovac death camp where they were all killed in April 1945.

== Consequences ==
Many authors emphasize that Stevan Moljević and his work Homogeneous Serbia played a crucial role in preparation of a coherent set of Chetnik war objectives with establishment of the Greater Serbia as one of the most important Chetnik war objectives. John R. Lampe pointed to the secondary status of the Central National Committee and Moljević's rise to prominence in this committee only in 1943, as significant details undercut the perception that Moljević's "Homogeneous Serbia" was the centerpiece of the coherent set of Chetnik war objectives.

== Sources ==
- Lees, Lorraine M. (2007). Yugoslav-Americans and National Security During World War II. University of Illinois Press. ISBN 978-0-252-03210-3.
- Matić, Milan B.; Vesović, Milan (1995). Ravnogorska ideja u štampi i propagandi četničkog pokreta u Srbiji 1941-1944. ISI. ISBN 9788674030639.
- Papadopolos, Dušan (1974). AVNOJ i narodnooslobodilačka borba u Bosni i Hercegovini: 1942-1943 : materijali sa naučnog skupa održanog u Sarajevu 22. i 23. novembra 1973. godine. Rad.
- Latas, Branko; Dželebdžić, Milovan (1979). Četnički pokret Draže Mihailovića 1941-1945. Beogradski izdavačko-grafički zavod.
- Vučković, Zvonimir; Krstić, Uglješa (2001). Ravnogorska istorijska čitanka: povest nacionalnog pokreta otpora u II svetskom ratu kroz dela učesnika i svedoka : jubilarno izdanje povodom šezdesetgodišnjice, 1941-2001. Bajat.
- Марковић, Василије (1998). Театри окупиране престонице, 1941-1944. Завод за уџбенике и наставна средства. ISBN 978-86-17-06369-4.
- Milićević, Nataša (2009). Југословенска власт и српско грађанство: 1944-1950. Институт за Новију Историју Србије. ISBN 978-86-7005-070-9.
- Lampe, John R. (28 March 2000). Yugoslavia as History: Twice There Was a Country. Cambridge University Press. ISBN 978-0-521-77401-7.
- Buchenau, Klaus (2004). Orthodoxie und Katholizismus in Jugoslawien 1945-1991: ein serbisch-kroatischer Vergleich. Otto Harrassowitz Verlag. ISBN 978-3-447-04847-7.
- Čubrilović, Vasa (1974). Istorija Beograda.
- Kovačević, Branislav (1993). Od vezirovog do zidanog mosta: tragična sudbina crnogorskih četnika u završnoj fazi rata : 1944-1945. Službeni list SRJ. ISBN 9788635501895.
- Pajović, Radoje; Željeznov, Dušan; Božović, Branislav (1987). Pavle Đurišić, Lovro Hacin, Juraj Špiler. Centar za informacije i publicitet. ISBN 978-86-7125-006-1.
- Čengić, Enes (1985). S Krležom iz dana u dan: Balade o životu koji teče. Globus.
- Minić, Miloš (1993). Oslobodilački ili građanski rat u Jugoslaviji 1941-1945. Agencija "Mir". ISBN 9788682295013.
