= Homogeneous Serbia =

Discourse by Stevan Moljević advocating for Greater Serbia

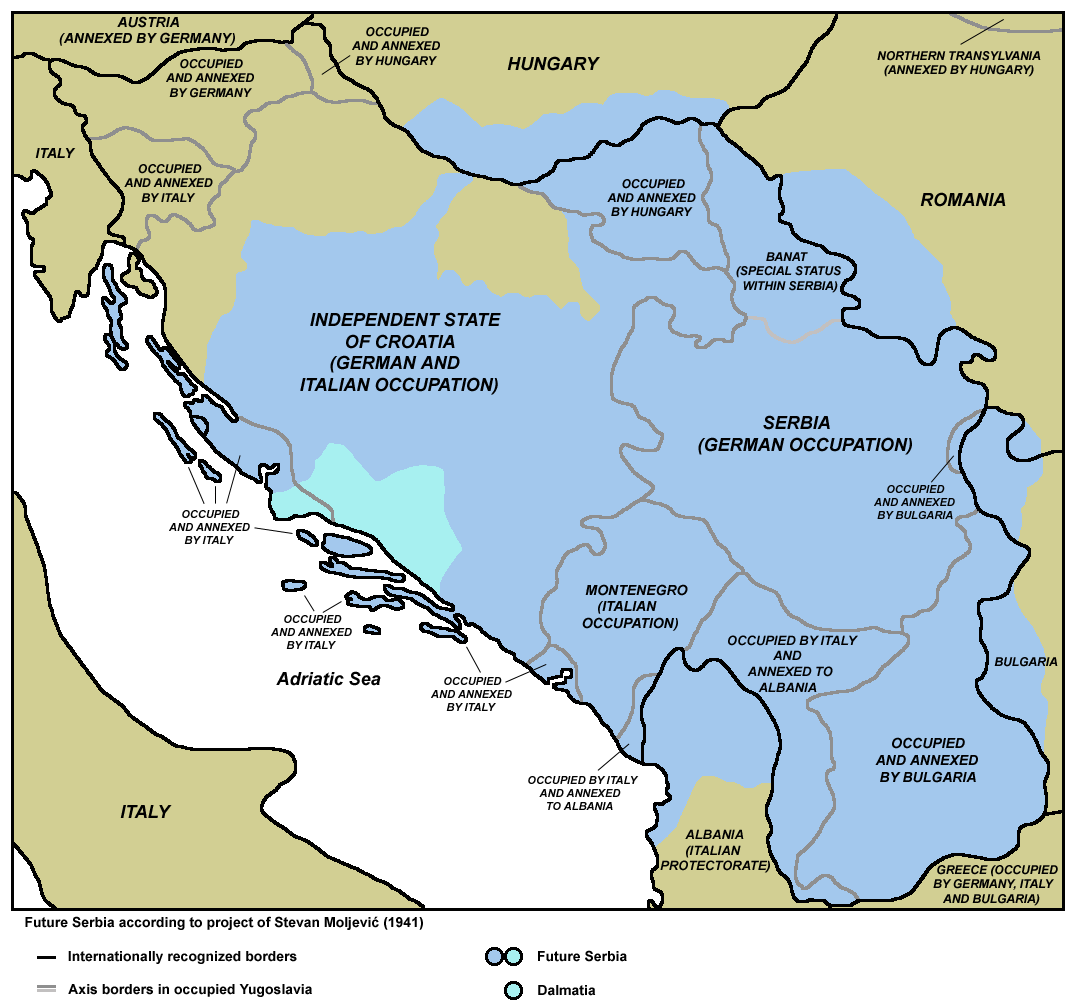
- Map of future Serbia as projected in Homogeneous Serbia
- Created: 30 June 1941
- Author: Stevan Moljević

Homogeneous Serbia is a written discourse by Stevan Moljević. The work emphasized that the Serbian state drew its strength from the degree to which its population identifies itself within the state, contrary to the presumptions of Ilija Garašanin, who believed that the strength of the state is derived from its size and organizational principles. Moljević believed that the victorious Kingdom of Serbia in 1918 made a grave mistake when it decided to establish Yugoslavia instead of clearly defining the borders of Serbia.

Right after the collapse of Yugoslavia during the short Axis invasion, Moljević created the concept of "homogeneous" Serbia and trialist Yugoslavia. The map presented in this work awards territory of northern Dalmatia with substantial Serb population to Croatia.

Moljević wrote another treatise titled An Opinion About Our State and Its Borders (Serbian: Мишљење о нашој држави, њеним границама), which he presented to Dragiša Vasić along with Homogeneous Serbia.

John R. Lampe pointed to significant details that undercut the perception of Moljević's Homogeneous Serbia being the centerpiece of a coherent set of Chetnik war objectives, such as that the Central National Committee had secondary status while Moljević did not rise to prominence in this committee until 1943. There is no proof that massacres of Muslims committed by Chetniks were a direct consequence of Moljević's tract, bearing in mind that Chetnik leader Mihailović's fragmented and very weak command structure militated against any systematic annihilation programme.

Other historians such as Jozo Tomasevich point out that many ideas presented by Moljević in his memorandum were also present in many other documents concerning Chetnik political objectives in World War II, whether originating directly from Homogenous Serbia, or as a result of similar thinking. Tomasevich also claims that in 1941, the Belgrade Chetnik Committee first created and then sent to the Yugoslav government-in-exile documents proposing large population transfers that were needed in order to make Greater Serbia exclusively Serbian. This required the forced expulsion of around 2,675,000 people, including one million Croats and 500,000 Germans. Redefined Greater Serbia would in return receive 1,310,000 men, out of which 300,000 were Croatian Serbs. It was also envisaged that the new Greater Serbian state would retain around the population of some 200,000 Croats. Fikreta Jelić Butić describes Homogenous Serbia as a Chetnik main political starting point and claims that its ideas were further elaborated in other Chetnik political documents such as the "Instructions" sent by Draža Mihailović to his associates Đorđe Lašić and Pavle Đurišić in Montenegro in December 1941.

== Sources ==
- Szajkowski, Bogdan (1 January 1993). Encyclopaedia of Conflicts, Disputes, and Flashpoints in Eastern Europe, Russia, and the Successor States. Longman Current Affairs. ISBN 978-0-582-21002-8.
- Sfikas, Thanasis D.; Williams, Christopher (1 January 1999). Ethnicity and Nationalism in East Central Europe and the Balkans. Ashgate. ISBN 978-1-85521-913-7.
- Krestić, Vasilije (2004). Great Serbia: truth, misconceptions, abuses : papers presented at the International Scientific Meeting held in the Serbian Academy of Sciences and Arts Belgrade, October 24-26, 2002. SANU. ISBN 978-86-7025-377-3.
- Lampe, John R. (28 March 2000). Yugoslavia as History: Twice There Was a Country. Cambridge University Press. ISBN 978-0-521-77401-7.
- Марковић, Михаило (2010). SRBIJA U KRIZI. Пешић и Синови. ISBN 978-86-7540-120-9.
- Levene, Mark (December 2013). Annihilation: Volume II: The European Rimlands 1939-1953. OUP Oxford. ISBN 978-0-19-968304-8.
