= Đura Dokić =

Serbian general

Đura L. Dokić
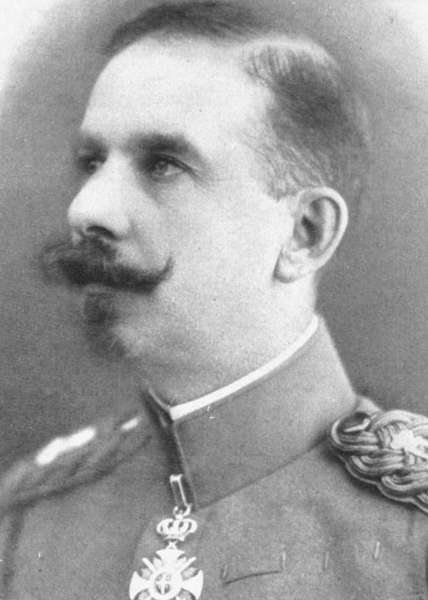
- Đura Dokić in WW1

Minister of Transportation of the Government of National Salvation
- In office 7 October 1941 – 10 November 1942
- Preceded by: None
- Succeeded by: Office abolished

Personal details
- Born: 21 December 1873 Užice, Principality of Serbia
- Died: 17 July 1946 (aged 72) Belgrade, PR Serbia, FPR Yugoslavia
- Cause of death: Execution by firing squad
- Profession: Soldier, politician

Military service
- Allegiance: Kingdom of Serbia; Kingdom of Yugoslavia; Government of National Salvation; Nazi Germany
- Rank: General

Đura Dokić (Serbian Cyrillic: Ђура Докић; 21 December 1873 – 17 July 1946) was a Serbian general, notable for being an Axis collaborator during World War II. He served in the Royal Serbian Army during the Balkan Wars and World War I, where he rose in ranks, and was awarded four state orders, including Karađorđe's Star. In the Royal Yugoslav Army (1918–41), he rose to the rank of Army general. He was appointed Minister of Transportation in the Government of National Salvation headed by Milan Nedić on 7 October 1941. He remained in that position for just over a year. The British captured him, along with other Serbian collaborationists. He was tried and sentenced to death in the 1946 Belgrade Process. His representative at the trial was barrister Dragoljub Joksimović. He was accused of "conspiring to ship slave workers into Germany" according to contemporary American newspapers.

== Military career ==
Royal Serbian Army

- Finished Military Academy on 2 August 1893 as 1st-class Captain.
- Received Infantry major rank (pešadijski major) (fl. 1910).
- Participated in the Balkan Wars. Received Lieutenant colonel (potpukovnik) rank. Commander of the VI Regiment. Active at the Battle of Bregalnica. Wounded.
- Received Colonel (pukovnik) rank before January 1914.
- Commander of 20th Infantry Regiment (20. pešadijski puk) as colonel, active at the Battle of Cer (15–24 August 1914).
- Commander of "Centre Section" and later "Right Section" as colonel at the Battle of Drina (6 September–4 October 1914).
- Commander of Negotin Detachment (Negotinski odred) as colonel, active in the Eastern Serbian front in October 1915.
- Active in the Crna Reka operation and the liberation of Bitola in 1916.

Royal Yugoslav Army

- Received General (armijski đeneral) rank in 1922–23.
- Titled "Commander of the Army" (komandant armije) in 1930.

== Awards ==
Dokić was awarded four state orders, including Karađorđe's Star, for his achievements in the 1912–18 wars.
