= Dragiša Vasić =

Serbian lawyer, writer, publicist, and Chetnik ideologue

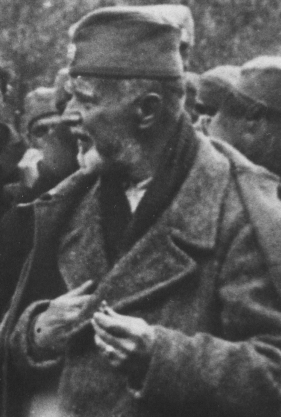
- Vasić in 1943 wearing a Chetnik uniform.
- Born: Dragomir Vasić; 2 September 1885; Gornji Milanovac, Serbia
- Died: 20 April 1945 (aged 59); Jasenovac, Independent State of Croatia
- Education: University of Belgrade
- Occupations: Lawyer; Writer; Publicist; Soldier

Dragomir "Dragiša" Vasić (Serbian Cyrillic: Драгиша Васић; 2 September 1885 – 20 April 1945) was a Serbian lawyer, writer and publicist who became one of the chief Chetnik ideologues during World War II. He finished law school in Belgrade and fought with the Serbian Army during the Balkan Wars and World War I. During the interwar period, he worked as a lawyer and represented a number of communist defendants. He was a member of the Serbian Academy of Sciences and Arts and became a correspondent at the Academy of Fine Arts on 12 February 1934. In 1936, he joined the Serbian Cultural Club and later became its vice-president. He is reported to have developed connections with Soviet intelligence services during this time.

Following the Axis invasion of Yugoslavia, he joined the Chetniks and became one of the three most important members of the Central National Committee established in August 1941 by Chetnik leader Draža Mihailović. Vasić quickly became Mihailović's right-hand man and remained so until 1943, when Mihailović named Stevan Moljević as head of the Central National Committee. In 1945, Vasić joined Chetnik commander Pavle Đurišić and his forces as they began withdrawing from Montenegro towards Slovenia. In April 1945, he was captured alongside Đurišić and other Chetnik commanders by the Ustaše troops and taken to the Jasenovac concentration camp, where he was executed along with Đurišić and others.

== Early life ==
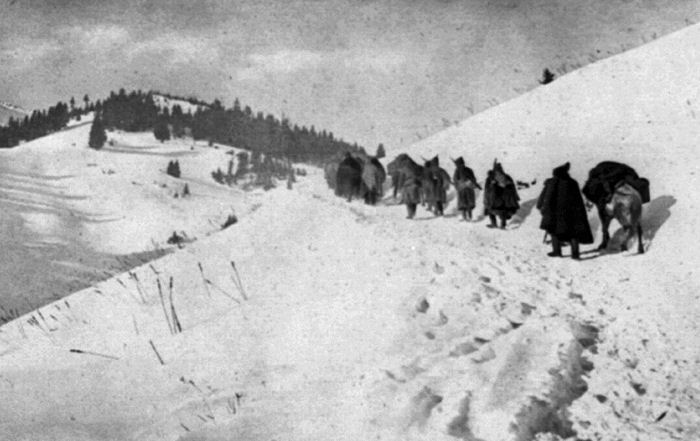
A column of Serbian soldiers retreating through the Albanian mountains, c. 1915. Vasić was involved in the Serbian Army's retreat through the country during World War I.

Dragiša Vasić was born in Gornji Milanovac, Kingdom of Serbia on 2 September 1885. He finished primary school and gymnasium in the town before moving to Belgrade to study law. Between 1912 and 1913, he fought in the Balkan Wars as a reserve officer in the Serbian Army and participated in the Battle of Kumanovo and the Battle of Bregalnica. He continued serving with the Serbian Army during World War I and fought at the Battle of Kolubara in November and December 1914. He retreated with Serbian forces through Albania during the winter of 1915 and 1916 and landed on the Greek island of Corfu, from where he was transferred to the Salonika front. In 1917, he became disillusioned with the Karađorđević dynasty following the Salonika Trial, in which Vasić's cousin, Ljubomir Vulović, was sentenced to death and executed for being a member of the Black Hand.

Vasić was de-mobilized at the end of the war, in November 1918, and left the army with the rank of captain. He expressed his opposition to regent Alexander by joining the Republican Party (Note: The party advocated an autonomous Serbian unit within the Kingdom of Serbs, Croats and Slovenes.) and became one of the editors of the independent Serbian newspaper Progres. Authorities responded to his publications by drafting him back into the armed forces. Vasić participated in military exercises near the Albanian border and was later transferred to the 30th Infantry Regiment, which had been involved in suppressing an uprising in northern Albania.

He began practicing law in Belgrade in 1921 and, in January 1922, represented a number of communist defendants who were accused of attempting to assassinate King Alexander. At around the same time, he became good friends with academic Slobodan Jovanović, who at the time opposed the ruling People's Radical Party (NRS) of Nikola Pašić. In 1922, he became close friends with Croat writer Miroslav Krleža, who regularly contributed to Vasić's magazine Književna republika (Literary Republic). Together with a group of prominent Serbian writers, he was one of the founders of the Yugoslav PEN center in 1926. In 1927, Vasić visited the Soviet Union with Vladislav S. Ribnikar and Sreten Stojanović. He became one of the editors of the leftist magazine Nova literatura (New Literature) at the end of 1928. By the time of King Alexander's royal dictatorship proclamation on 6 January 1929, Vasić was widely believed to be a communist sympathizer as a result of his dissatisfaction with post-war political developments in the Kingdom of Serbs, Croats and Slovenes. In 1931, he used his connections with General Petar Živković to secure the release of Đuro Cvijić, a former leader of the Communist Party of Yugoslavia who had been sentenced to death by authorities. Vasić was a member of the Serbian Academy of Sciences and Arts (SANU) and became a correspondent at the Academy of Fine Arts on 12 February 1934.

Vasić left the Republican Party and, with Jovanović's encouragement, founded the nationalist Serbian Cultural Club in 1936. He later became its vice-president. Before World War II, he edited a periodical titled Srpski glas (Serbian Voice). Together with Milan Žujović and Milan Nikolić, Vasić was member of the Executive Council of the secret society Conspiracy, (Serbian: Конспирација), established on 8 August 1938 to perform a coup d'état and overthrow the regime of Prince Pavle with support of United Kingdom. He sided with Serbian nationalists during the concordat crisis in 1938 and opposed the Cvetković–Maček Agreement of August 1939, which granted greater autonomy to Croatia within the Kingdom of Yugoslavia. Vasić is reported to have had some contacts with Soviet intelligence services.

== World War II ==
=== Central National Committee, Congress of Ba and Operation Halyard ===
Vasić aligned himself with Draža Mihailović and his Chetniks in the summer of 1941, following the Axis invasion of Yugoslavia that April. In August, Mihailović named him to the Central National Committee. Vasić was one of the three most important members of the committee, the other two being Bosnian Serb lawyer Dr Stevan Moljević and Vasić's former law partner and fellow Republican Mladen Žujović. The three formed Mihailović's so-called Executive Council for much of the war, and Vasić was specifically designated as the individual who would succeed Mihailović as leader of the Chetnik movement should anything happen to him. At some point in 1941, Mihailović designated Vasić as head of the committee. According to historian Stevan K. Pavlowitch, Vasić was effectively Mihailović's right-hand man. The Central Committee advised him on matters of domestic and international politics and maintained liaison with civilian followers of the Chetniks in Serbia and other regions. Historian Jozo Tomasevich notes that Vasić was "unsuited" to be the head of the committee, due to his "personality and lack of political experience".

Vasić became one of the two principal Chetnik ideologues, alongside Moljević. He began expressing vehemently anti-communist views after joining the Chetniks and opposed any collaboration with the Germans and Italians. He wrote:

I have always supported the idea of opposing the communists. This is what I have been telling the Commander [Mihailović] from the very first day. But I also advised him that their extermination should be left to the Germans and Italians. We would only need to secure the territory, which is what we did in Serbia in 1941. In no way should we fight against them with the occupying forces. The civil war, which the Commander instigated, is not popular with our people. Our people love freedom and hate anyone who tries to enslave them. For this reason, they cannot accept open collaboration of some of our commanders with the Germans and Italian troops, who have subjected them to unspeakable terror and atrocious crimes. This is what is most horrible for us and what could bring real catastrophe. I am increasingly convinced that this open collaboration of our commanders with the Italian and German troops is the main reason for our defeats in combat with the Partisans, both militarily and politically.

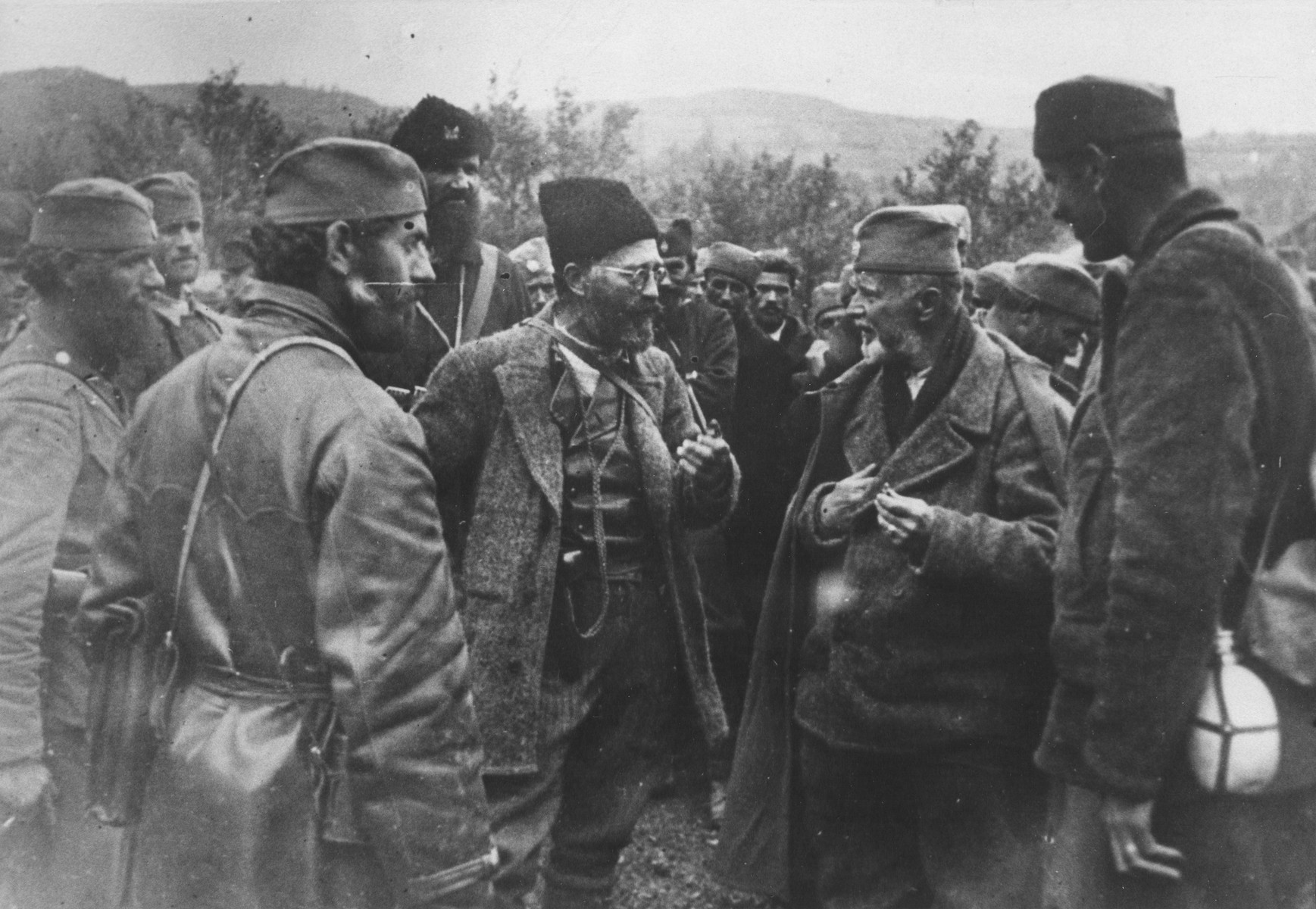
Vasić (second from right) speaking with Draža Mihailović and other Chetniks.

Moljević wrote to Vasić in December 1941 and outlined his plan for the cleansing of Yugoslavia of all non-Serbian elements by Serbian refugees. He stated that Serbs should take control of "all strategic points" in Yugoslavia and claimed that a large Serbian state was what Serbs had been fighting for since the time of Karađorđe. In February 1942, Vasić received a letter from Moljević concerning the creation of a Greater Serbia stretching to Dalmatia and the Adriatic coast. Moljević wrote that the "cleansing" (čišćenje) of all non-Serbs would be needed if such a state was to survive. He stated that Croats should be deported to Croatia and Muslims to Albania or Turkey. Author Mitja Velikonja writes that Vasić endorsed such a plan. In 1943, he resigned as head of the Central National Committee in protest of continued Chetnik collaboration with the Italians. He was succeeded by Moljević. Tomasevich notes that the quality of political advice that Mihailović received did not improve even after Moljević replaced Vasić as his main political advisor.

Vasić stood opposed to the Ba Congress, organized by the Chetniks between 25 and 28 January 1944 in the Serbian village of Ba. He was particularly opposed to the political concepts laid out by Moljević and socialist politician Živko Topalović, stating: "I do not know why the Commander [Mihailović] needed this congress; I have to admit [it] was a circus of formality as far as I'm concerned."

In July 1944, Vasić and his wife met with Richard Felman and other American pilots, whose B-24 Liberators were shot down by the Germans near the Serbian village of Pranjani. Vasić told Felman that the Chetniks would do everything in their power to protect the downed airmen and explained that the Germans had discovered the wreckage of Felman's plane. Vasić told him that they had recovered the body of a dead American pilot and assigned a young Chetnik named Miodrag Stefanović to be Felman's bodyguard. Felman was one of several hundred American airmen who were rescued by the Chetniks during Operation Halyard, and he spent much of his life speaking fervently about the debt he owed to the Chetniks.

=== Retreat and death ===
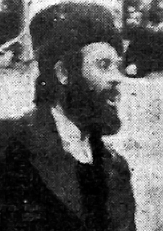
Chetnik commander Pavle Đurišić. In 1945, Vasić joined up with Đurišić and his Chetniks in an attempt to reach Slovenia and evade the communists.

Vasić and many other Chetnik commanders refused to accept Mihailović's decision to withdraw all Chetniks from Serbia to the Sandžak and north-eastern Bosnia following the Belgrade Offensive in late 1944. Vasić elected to abandon Mihailović and move westward independently of him. He joined Chetnik commander Pavle Đurišić and his forces as they began withdrawing from Montenegro towards Slovenia. Historian Jozo Tomasevich writes that this decision is indicative of how greatly divided the Chetniks were towards the end of the war.

Đurišić had arranged for Dimitrije Ljotić's forces already in the Ljubljana Gap to meet him near Bihać in western Bosnia and assist his movement. In all, about 10,000 Chetniks and Serbian civilian refugees joined Đurišić in his withdrawal west. In order to get to Bihać, Đurišić made a safe-conduct agreement with elements of the Armed Forces of the Independent State of Croatia (HOS) and with the Montenegrin separatist Sekula Drljević. The details of the agreement are not known, but it appears Đurišić, Ostojić and Baćović and their troops were meant to cross the Sava River into Slavonia where they would be aligned with Drljević as the "Montenegrin National Army" with Đurišić retaining operational command. The Chetniks however, appear to have tried to outsmart the HOS forces and Drljević by sending their sick and wounded across the river, but retaining their fit troops south of the river, after which they began moving them westwards. Harassed by both the HOS troops and Partisans, they reached the Vrbas River, which they began to cross. In the Battle of Lijevče Field, north of Banja Luka, the combined Chetnik force was badly beaten by a strong HOS force which possessed German-supplied tanks. Following this defeat and the defection of one of their sub-units to Drljević, Đurišić was induced to negotiate directly with the leaders of the HOS forces about the further movement of the Chetniks towards the Ljubljana Gap. However, this appears to have been a trap, as he was attacked and captured by them on his way to the meeting. On 20 April, Đurišić, Baćović, Vasić and Ostojić were taken to the Stara Gradiška prison, near Jasenovac. The Ustaše gathered them in a field alongside 5,000 other Chetnik prisoners and arranged for Drljević and his followers to select 150 Chetnik officers and non-combatant intellectuals for execution. Đurišić, Baćović, Vasić and Ostojić were amongst those selected. They and the others were loaded onto boats by the Ustaše and taken across the Sava River, never to be seen again. It is reported that they were killed either in the Jasenovac concentration camp itself, or in a marsh in its vicinity. Both the NDH forces and Drljević had reasons for ensnaring Đurišić. The NDH forces were motivated by the mass terror committed by Đurišić on the Muslim population in Sandžak and southeastern Bosnia while Drljević was opposed to Đurišić's support of a union of Serbia and Montenegro which ran counter to Drljević's separatism. Drljević and his wife were discovered by Đurišić's followers after the war and killed in an Austrian refugee camp.

== Literary works ==
Vasić was one of the most eminent Serbian writers of the interwar period. His first book, titled Karakter i mentalitet jednog pokoljenja (The Character and Mentality of a Generation), was published in 1919, shortly after the end of World War I. A book titled Dva meseca u jugoslovenskom sibiru (Two Months in the Yugoslav Siberia) was published in 1920, shortly after he returned to Belgrade from military exercises on the Albanian border. The term "Yugoslav Siberia" was coined by Vasić and referred to the region of Kosovo. In 1922, Vasić published a short story collection titled Utuljena kandila (Inflamed Candles) and a novel titled Crvene magle (Red Fogs). Professor Stanko Korać considers Crvene magle one of the thirty Yugoslav novels most representative of the interwar period.

Vasić focused on writing over the next five years, between 1922 and 1927, and published several articles about classical Russian literature. In 1924, he published a book titled Vitlo i druge priče ("Winch" and Other Stories) and in 1926 he published a novel titled Bakić Ulija. Upon returning from the Soviet Union in 1927, he wrote a book titled Utisci iz Rusije (Impressions From Russia), which was published the following the year. In 1932, he published a novel titled Pad sa građevine (Fall From a Building), after which he became less active in literary circles.

== Legacy ==
Following World War II, Yugoslavia's new communist authorities declared Vasić a collaborator and banned all of his works. Serbian publishers began printing his works in the 1980s, following the death of Josip Broz Tito. In 1985, Serbian writer Dobrica Ćosić published a novel which portrayed Vasić in a sympathetic light.

Serbian authors disagree over whether Vasić was a communist agent within the Chetnik ranks. The first calls for Vasić's rehabilitation in Yugoslavia came in 1988. More than twenty years passed before he was officially fully rehabilitated by the Government of Serbia on 3 December 2009, at the request of his daughter.
