= Trial of Mihailović et al. =

Trial of Chetnik members by FPR Yugoslavia

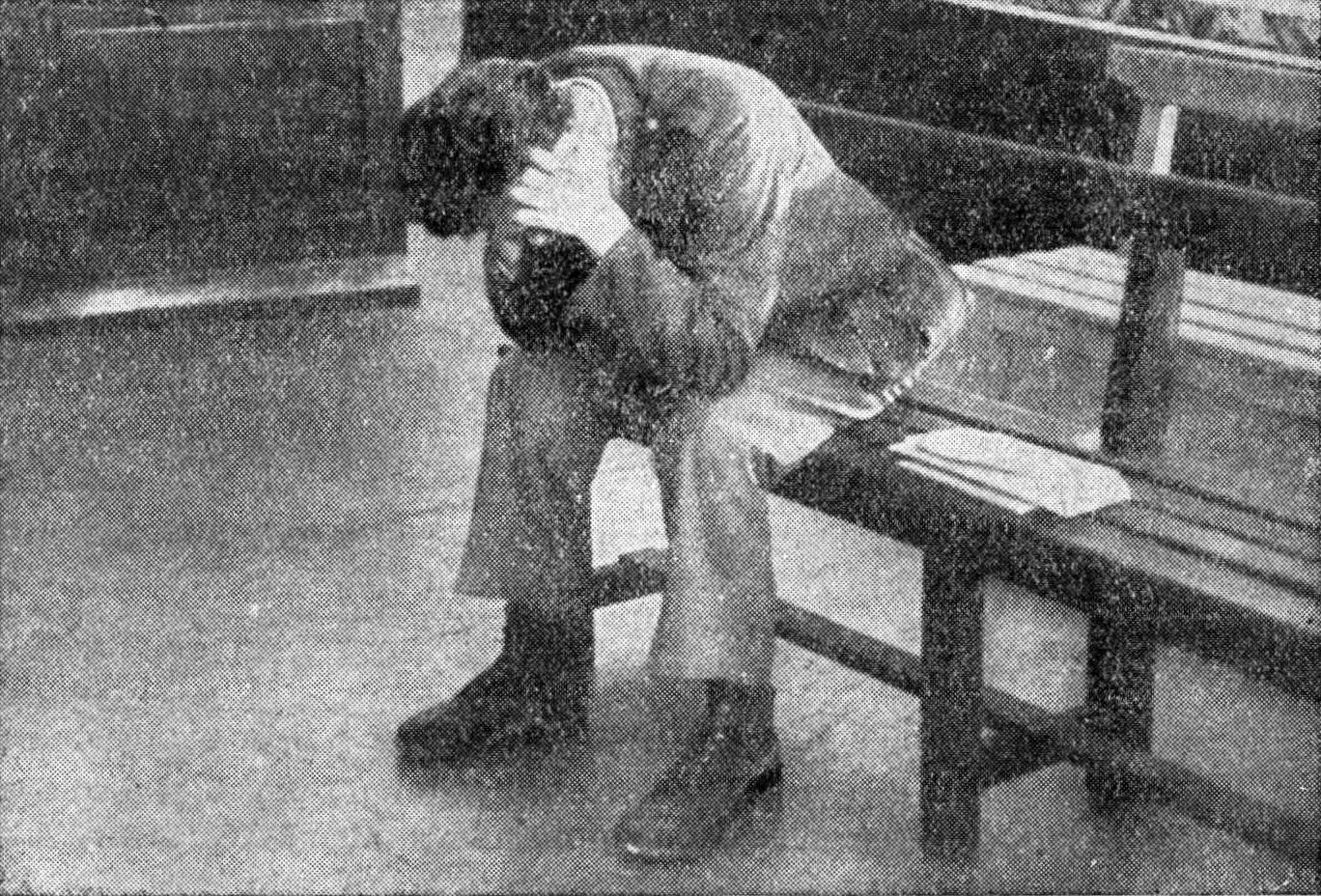
Defendant Dragoljub Mihailović in 1946. He was later rehabilitated in 2015, with his conviction being held to be null and void.

The Trial of Draža Mihailović et al., or the Belgrade Process (Serbo-Croatian: Београдски процес, romanized: Beogradski proces), was the 1946 trial of Chetnik general Draža Mihailović and a number of other prominent convicted collaborators for high treason and war crimes committed during World War II.

Mihailović was tried as a leader of the Chetnik movement during World War II (the "Yugoslav Army in the Fatherland", JVUO). His co-defendants were other prominent figures of the movement and members of the Yugoslav government-in-exile, such as Slobodan Jovanović, along with members of ZBOR and of the Nedić regime like Velibor Jonić. The trial opened on June 10, 1946, before the Military Council of the Supreme Court of the Federal People’s Republic of Yugoslavia, and lasted until July 15, 1946. The trial opened in the presence of about 60 foreign journalists. The court was located in the Summer Hall of the Infantry Training School at Topčider in Belgrade.

In 2015, the Supreme Court of Serbia rehabilitated Mihailović and overturned his conviction, ruling that it was the result of a communist political show trial that was fundamentally and inherently unfair.

== Indictment ==
The accused were tried before a military court. The president of the council was Mihailo Đordević and the members Milija Laković and Mihailo Janković, with Todor Popadić as secretary. The assistant judges were Nikola Stanković and Radomir Ilić. The prosecutor was Miloš Minić, a high-ranking government official who took part in Tito-Mihailović negotiations in 1941. The assistant prosecutor was Miloš Jovanović.

Mihailović and others were tried mainly for their activities against Allied forces, the Yugoslav Partisans, for collaboration with the Germans and for war crimes against civilians. Mihailović was indicted on 47 counts. He was found guilty of all charges and sentenced to death.

The Allied airmen he had rescued in 1944 were not allowed to testify in his favor. Only two women came to testify in favor of Mihailović. Reportedly, they were heckled by the audience and, after the trial, submitted to a professional interdiction. At the trial the witness that appeared were: Dušan Simović, Radoslav Đurić, Jovan Škavović, Miša Simović and Milan Grol.

== Indictees ==
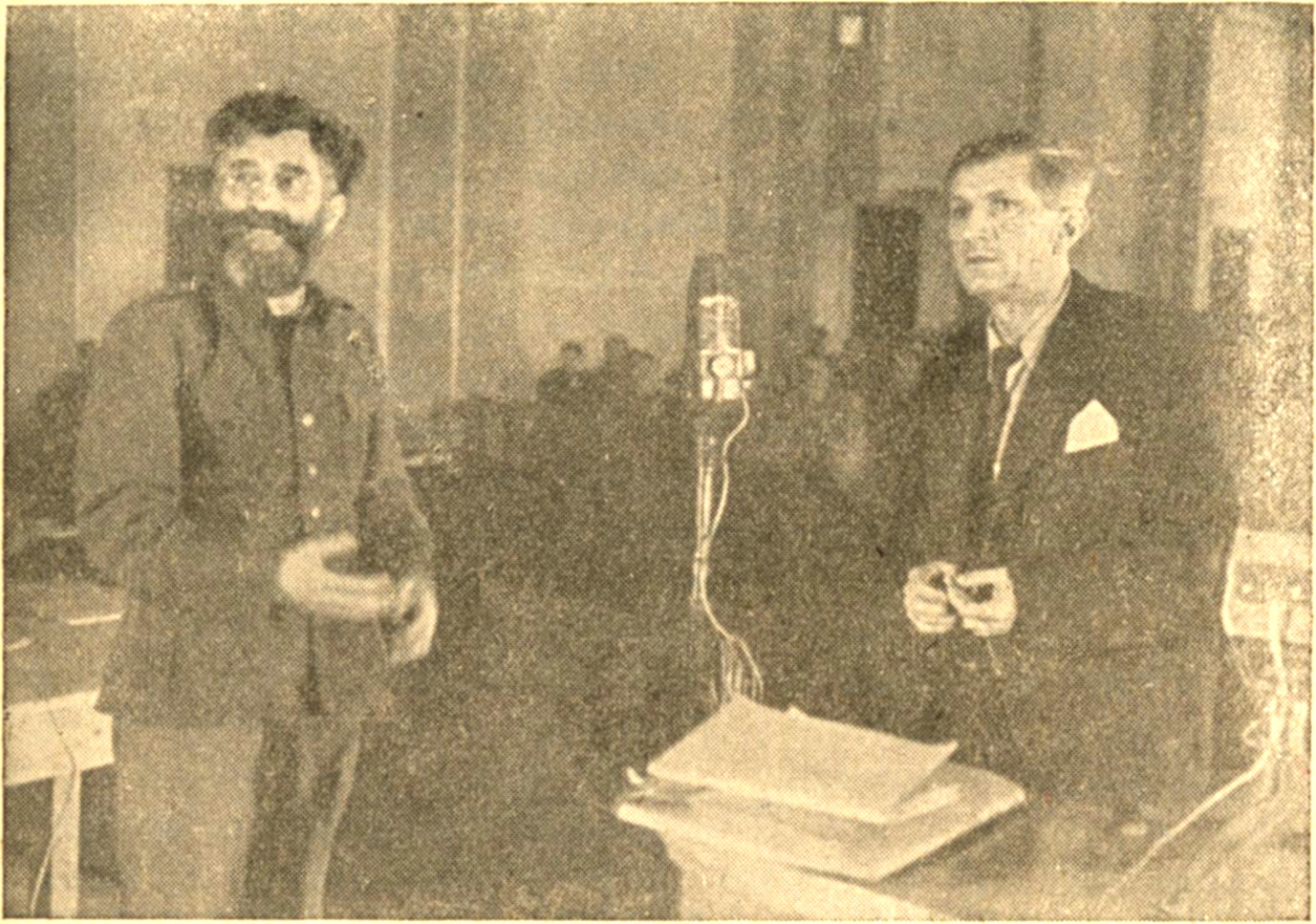
Confrontation of Draža Mihailović and Dragi Jovanović on trial, Belgrade, 1946

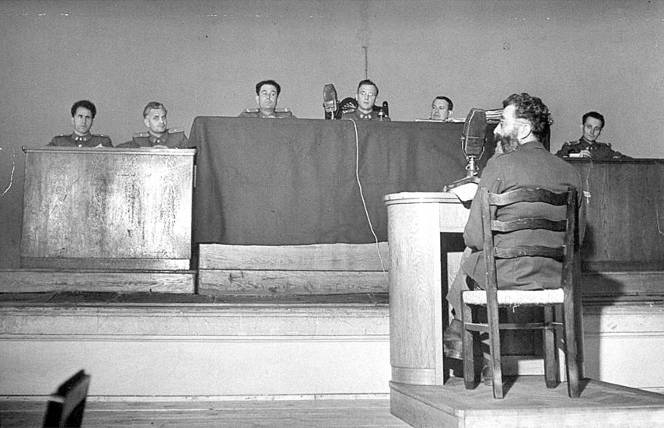
Draža Mihailović under trial

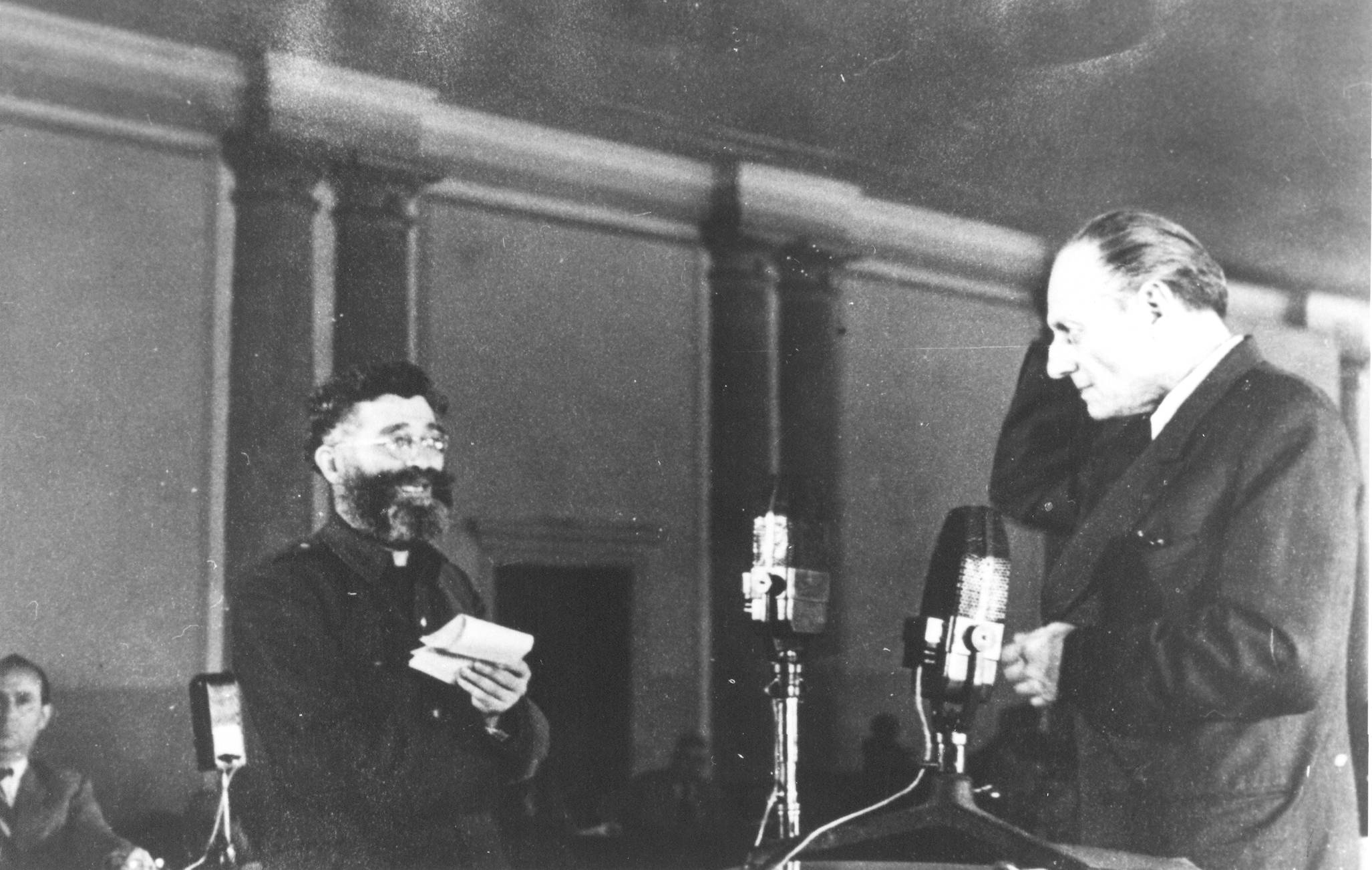
Confrontation of Draža Mihailović and Tanasije Dinić

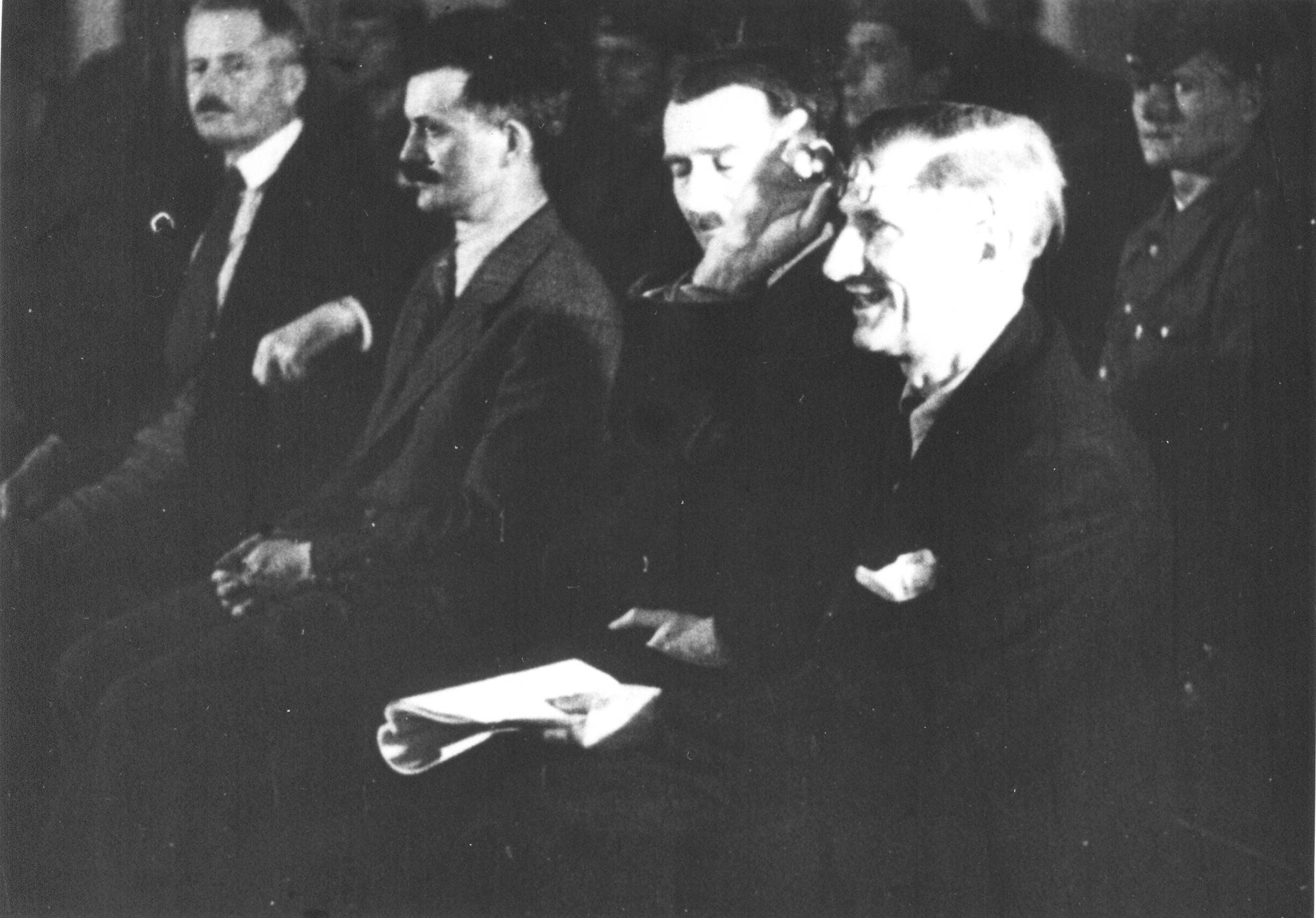
Rade Radić (far left), Slavoljub Vranješević (next to Radić) and Dragi Jovanović (right) during the trial

The accused were, in the order their names were read out at the trial:

No.	Indictee	Position	Defender(s)	Penalty	Notes
1	Draža Mihailović	Leader of the Chetnik movement	Nikola Đonović and Dragić Joksimović	Death	Executed on 17 July 1946
2	Stevan Moljević	President of the Executive board of Chetnik Central National Committee (CNK)		20 years	Died in prison
3	Mladen Žujović	Member of the CNK; Commander of Chetniks in Dalmatia, Lika and western Bosnia (1943–1945)	Nikola Radovanović	Death (in absentia)	
4	Živko Topalović	Vice President of Executive board of CNK	Nikola Radovanović	20 years (in absentia)	
5	Đuro Vilović	Secretary of the Executive Board of CNK	Milan Omčikus	7 years	
6	Rade Radić	Member of CNK; Commander of Chetnik detachment Borja	Lazar Vučetić	Death	Executed on 17 July 1946
7	Slavoljub Vranješević	Chetnik commander of western Bosnia (1943–1945)	Blažo Radović	20 years	
8	Miloš Glišić	Commander of Požega Chetnik Detachment and Sandžak Military Chetnik Detachment	Blažo Radović	Death	Executed on 17 July 1946
9	Slobodan Jovanović	Prime Minister in Yugoslav government-in-exile (YGE) (1942–1943)	Miloš Terzić	20 years (in absentia)	
10	Božidar Purić	Prime Minister in YGE (1943-1944)	Pavle Miljaković	16 years (in absentia)	
11	Momčilo Ninčić	Minister of Foreign Affairs in YGE (1941–1943)	David Alkalaj	8 years (in absentia)	
12	Petar Živković	Minister without Portfolio in YGE (1943–1945)	Pavle Miljaković	Death (in absentia)	
13	Radoje Knežević	Minister of the Royal Court in YGE (1941–1943)	Slobodan Subotić	10 years (in absentia)	
14	Milan Gavrilović	Minister of Justice, Agriculture, Supply and Food in YGE	Slobodan Subotić	15 years (in absentia)	
15	Živan Knežević	Military liaison officer between the Chetniks and government-in-exile	Dragutin Tasić	20 years (in absentia)	
16	Konstantin Fotić	Ambassador to USA of government-in-exile	Dragutin Tasić	20 years (in absentia)	
17	Dragomir "Dragi" Jovanović	Nazi appointed Mayor of Belgrade; Chief of State Security	Slavko Dukanac	Death	Executed on 17 July 1946
18	Tanasije Dinić	Deputy Commissar of Interior in Commissioner Government; Minister of Interior (1942-1943) and Minister of Social Policy and Health (1943-1944) in Government of National Salvation	Bogoljub Jovanović	Death	Executed on 17 July 1946
19	Velibor Jonić	Commissar of Education in Commissioner Government; Minister of Education in Government of National Salvation	Milan Živadinović	Death	Executed on 17 July 1946
20	Đura Dokić	Minister of Transportation in Government of National Salvation (1941-1942)	Dragoljub Joksimović	Death	Executed on 17 July 1946
21	Kosta Mušicki	Commander of Serbian Volunteer Corps	Đorđe Ćirić	Death	Executed on 17 July 1946
22	Boško Pavlović	Assistant to commander of Serbian State Guard and State undersecretary in Government of National Salvation	Slobodan Subotić	Death	Executed on 17 July 1946
23	Laza Marković	Signator of Appeal to the Serbian Nation	Aleksandar Nikolić	6 years	
24	Kosta Kumanudi	Signator of Appeal to the Serbian Nation	Friedrich Pops	18 months	

Out of the twenty-four accused individuals mentioned above, ten were tried in absentia.

== Foreign accreditation ==
Media teams were sent by the news agencies TASS, ČTK, PAP, Reuters, Associated Press, Agence France-Presse, United Press, Overseas News Agency, International News Service, the Jewish Telegraphic Agency, Tele Press, the Albanian Telegraphic Agency and the following newspapers: Pravda, Izvestia, The Times, the Daily Worker, The New York Times, the New York Herald Tribune, the News Chronicle, the Daily Express and others.

== Verdict ==
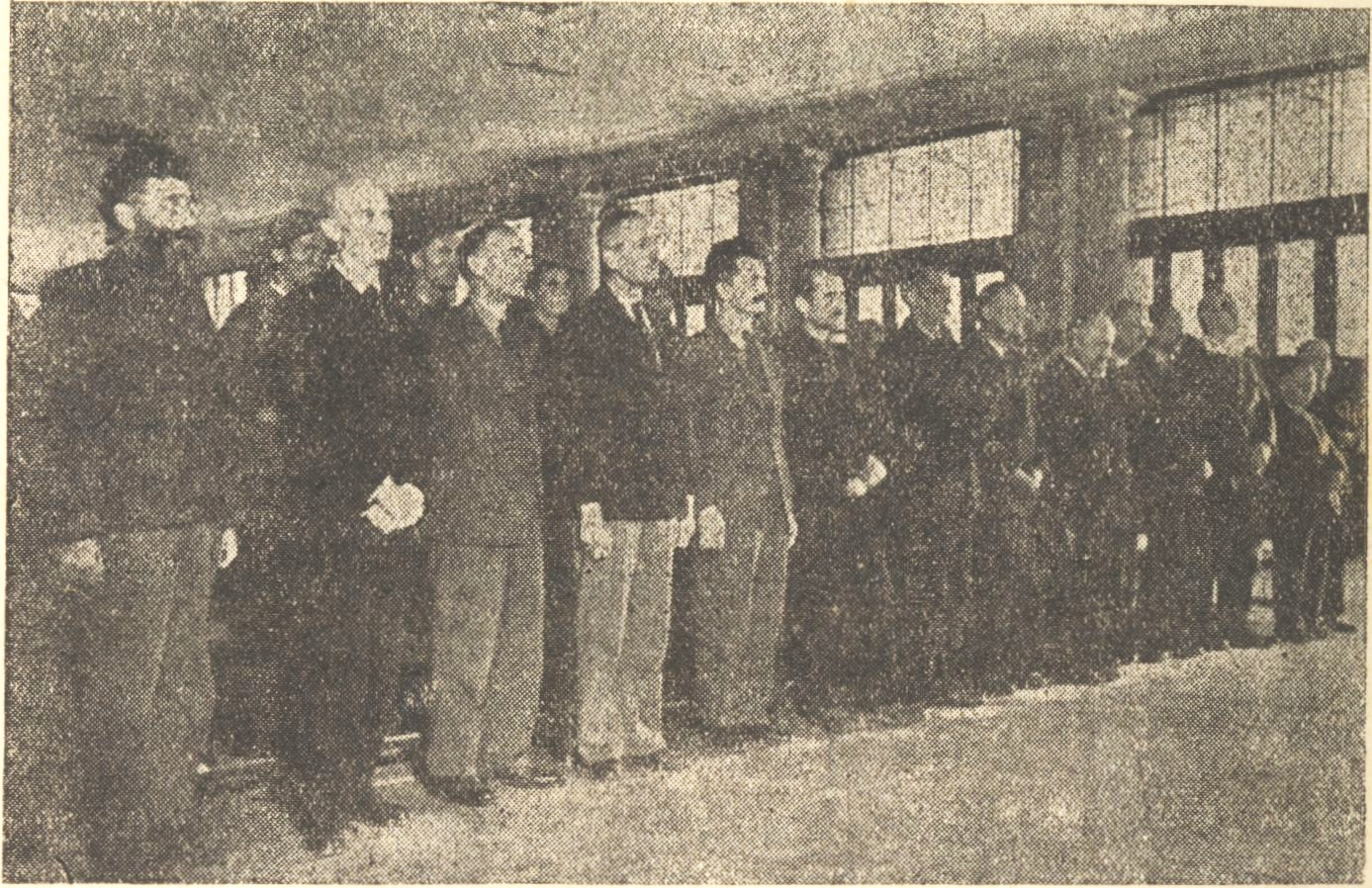
Reading the verdict on Belgrade process. From left to right standing: Mihailović, Moljević, Vilović, Radić, Vranješević, Glišić, Jovanović, Dinić, Jonić, Dokić, Mušicki, Pavlović, Marković and Kumanudi.

Mihailović is quoted as saying, in his final statement, "I wanted much; I began much; but the gale of the world carried away me and my work.". "Gale of the world" is sometimes translated "Winds of War."

The verdict was read on 15 July 1946. Mihailović and ten others were sentenced to death by a firing squad (two in absentia). An appeal was rejected on 16 July and the nine were executed on 17 July. The remaining defendants were sentenced to penalties ranging from 18 months to 20 years in prison.

== Reactions ==
In six days of questioning by the public prosecutor, Mihaylovitch admitted to guilt on practically all counts, although he appears to have done his best to shield behind a plea that he was a victim of circumstance and of the disobedience of his own commanders in the field.

— Basil Davidson

The trial showed, according to historian Jozo Tomasevich, that Mihailović had never possessed firm and full control over his local commanders. A committee for the fair trial of General Mihailovic was set up in the United States, but to no avail.

Diplomat and author Walter Roberts stated that the trial was "anything but a model of justice" and that "it is clear that Mihailović was not guilty of all, or even many, of the charges brought against him" though Tito would probably not have had a fair trial either, had Mihailović prevailed.

At the time of the trial, there were protests from the Americans and the French, although both were moderated by their interest in the new government.

According to Mihailović biographer Jean-Christophe Buisson, one of Mihailović's lawyers, Dragić Joksimović, was arrested a few days after the execution and died in prison under unclear circumstances.

== Modern views ==
More recently, there were calls for a retrial and/or rehabilitation. Momčilo Ninčić was officially rehabilitated in 2006 and Slobodan Jovanović in 2007 by Serbia. In 2015, the Supreme Court of Serbia invalidated Mihailović's conviction. The court held that it had been a Communist political show trial that was controlled by the government. The court concluded that Mihailović had not received a fair trial. Mihailović was, therefore, fully rehabilitated.

== Proceedings ==
Date	Event
13 March	Mihailović is captured.
24 March	Aleksandar Ranković announces the capture of Mihailović, as well as charges against him.
2 April	The US State Department announces it has requested that American Army personnel be allowed to testify at the trial.
17 May	The trial is delayed to 10 June.
10 June	The trial begins.
15 July	Death sentence delivered to Mihailović. He is given eight and a half hours to appeal to the Yugoslav Presidency.
16 July	Appeal is denied by the Presidency.
17 July	Execution by firing squad is carried out.
