= Stevan Moljević =

Yugoslav politician and Chetnik (1888–1959)

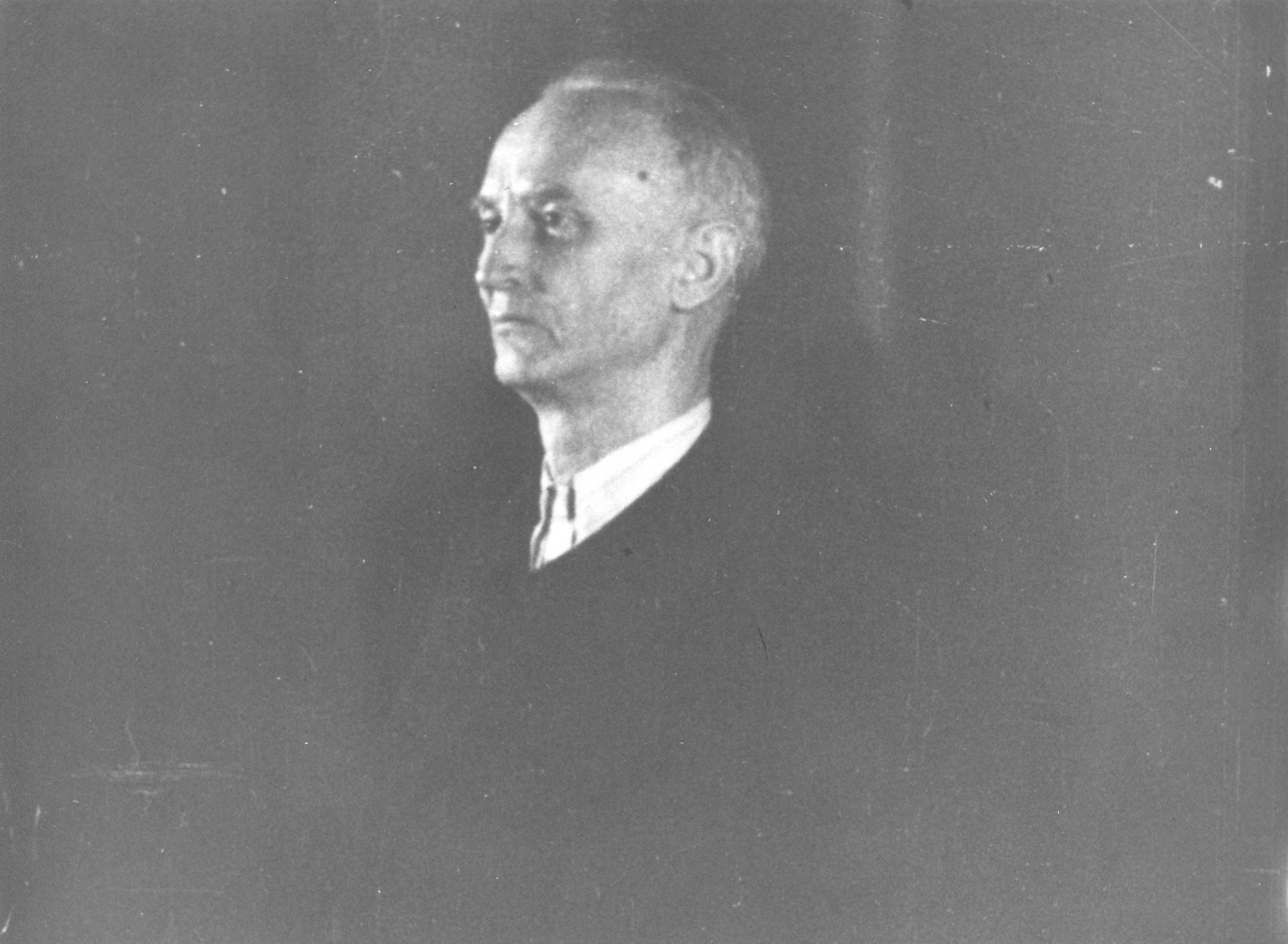
- Doctor Stevan Moljević at his trial (1946)
- Born: January 6, 1888; Rudo, Austria-Hungary
- Died: November 15, 1959 (aged 71); Sremska Mitrovica Prison, Sremska Mitrovica, PR Serbia, FPR Yugoslavia
- Citizenship: Austrian, Yugoslav
- Occupations: Politician, lawyer and publicist
- Known for: Prominent member of the Central National Committee of Yugoslavia during World War II

Stevan Moljević (6 January 1888 – 15 November 1959) was a Yugoslav and Serbian politician, lawyer and publicist, president of the Yugoslav-French Club, president of the Yugoslav-British Club, president of Rotary International Club of Yugoslavia and member of the Central National Committee of Yugoslavia (CNK) in World War II. In his 1941 memorandum Homogeneous Serbia, Moljević advocated the creation of a Greater Serbia and its ethnic cleansing of the non-Serb population.

After the war, Moljević was sentenced to 20 years for war crimes and treason. He died in prison in 1959.

== Early life ==
Stevan Moljević was born to Jovan and Mirjana (Miriam) Moljević (Kohen) on 6 January 1888 in Rudo, Austria-Hungary. He finished primary school in the town and later joined Young Bosnia, a revolutionary movement which aimed to unite all South Slavs into one common state. He was arrested by Austro-Hungarian authorities in 1910 after a member of Young Bosnia attempted to assassinate Marijan Varešanin, the region's governor. In 1915, Moljević was arrested and charged with treason by Austro-Hungarian authorities. He was found guilty of treason and sentenced to ten years of hard labour. He was released from prison after Austria-Hungary's collapse in 1918, and was later awarded the French Legion of Honour and Serbian Order of St. Sava.

Moljević obtained a law degree at the University of Zagreb before moving to Banja Luka, where he worked as an attorney prior to the outbreak of World War II. He was also the head of the local branch of the Serbian Cultural Club. Moljević was married and had two children.

== World War II ==
Moljević left Banja Luka on 10 April 1941, the day that the Independent State of Croatia (NDH) was proclaimed, and fled to Montenegro. On 30 June, he wrote a memorandum in Montenegro calling for the creation of Homogeneous Serbia. This enlarged Serbian state was to include Central Serbia, Vojvodina, Kosovo, Macedonia, Montenegro, Bosnia, Herzegovina, Dalmatia, Slavonia and northern Albania, as well as parts of Romania, Bulgaria, and Hungary. Moljević proposed dividing a rump Croatia into two parts and enlarging Slovenia with territories annexed from Italy and Austria. He believed that Serbs should not repeat the mistakes of World War I by failing to define the borders of Serbia, and proposed that at the end of World War II they should take control of all territories to which they laid claim, and from that position negotiate the form of a federally organized Yugoslavia. This plan required the relocation of non-Serbs from Serb-controlled territories and other shifts of populations. Moljević proposed that Greater Serbia consist of 65–70% of the total Yugoslav territory and population. He based his plan on the expulsion of the non-Serb population in different areas and on population exchanges, but did not provide any figures. Moljević's proposals were very similar to those later formulated by the Belgrade Chetnik Committee and presented to the government-in-exile in September 1941, in which the Chetniks set forth specific figures in regard to population shifts.

In August 1941, Chetnik leader Draža Mihailović named Moljević to the Central National Committee. Moljević became one of the three most important members of the committee, the other two being the lawyers Dragiša Vasić and Mladen Žujović. The three men formed Mihailović's so-called Executive Council for much of the war. The Central Committee advised Mihailović on matters of domestic and international politics and maintained liaison with civilian followers of the Chetniks in Serbia and other regions.

Moljević wrote to Vasić in December 1941 and outlined his plan for the cleansing of Yugoslavia of all non-Serbian elements by Serbian refugees. He stated that Serbs should take control of "all strategic points" in Yugoslavia and claimed that a large Serbian state was what Serbs had been fighting for since the time of Karađorđe. In February 1942, Vasić received a letter from Moljević concerning the creation of a Greater Serbia stretching to Dalmatia and the Adriatic coast. Moljević wrote that the "cleansing" (Serbo-Croatian: čišćenje) of all non-Serbs would be needed if such a state was to survive. He stated that Croats should be deported to Croatia and Muslims to Albania or Turkey. Moljević came to Chetnik headquarters of Draža Mihailović in May 1942. He was then included in activities of CNK whose members were already Dragiša Vasić and Mladen Žujović.

In 1943, Moljević usurped Vasić as head of the Central National Committee. John R. Lampe pointed to significant details such as that the Central National Committee had secondary status while Moljević did not rise to prominence in this committee until 1943, which undercut the perception about Moljević's Homogeneous Serbia being the centerpiece of a coherent set of Chetnik war objectives.

He attended the Ba Congress in January 1944, where he delivered a report concerning the condition of the Chetniks within Yugoslavia. Following Belgrade's capture by communist forces, Moljević visited Bosanska Krajina and appealed to its inhabitants for support. He also called for Bosnian Muslims and Croats to join the Chetniks in fighting the Yugoslav Partisans.

== Capture, imprisonment and death ==
Moljević was arrested by the Yugoslav Partisan forces on 23 September 1945 and tried alongside Mihailović and twenty-two others in the summer of 1946 on grounds of collaborationism and organized insurrection. He was found guilty of collaboration with the Axis powers and sentenced to a twenty-year imprisonment. The communists stripped him of all his political and civic rights and all of his property and belongings were confiscated. Moljević was sent to the northern Serbian town of Sremska Mitrovica and was imprisoned there. His health began to deteriorate in 1956 and the following year he was diagnosed with colon cancer. He underwent an unsuccessful operation in Belgrade before being sent back to Sremska Mitrovica Prison, where he died on 15 November 1959. He was buried at the New Cemetery in Belgrade.

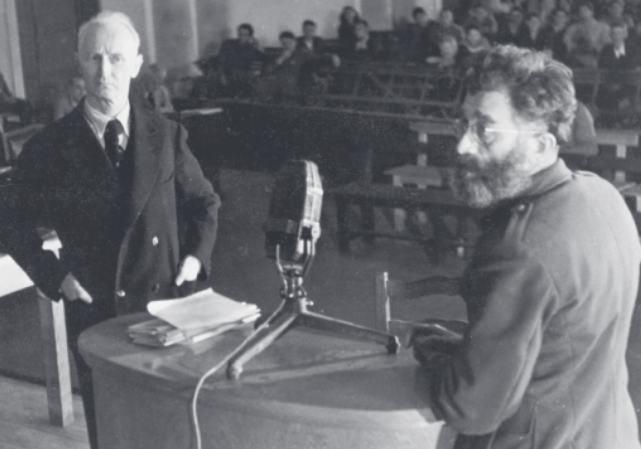
Stevan Moljević with Draža Mihailović during their trial.

== Bibliography ==
In 2019 a group of historians published a book authored by Moljević, based on his handwritten scripts, titled "Ravna Gora u svetlu i magli" (lit. 'Ravna Gora in light and fog'). The scripts were published together with other documents he authored earlier. Moljević secretly wrote these scripts on toilet paper during his imprisonment. They remained hidden in the wall, under the wooden window, and kept in the archives after they were found.
