= Dragić Joksimović =

Serbian politician and attorney

Dragić Joksimović (Bačina, 18 July 1893 – Sremska Mitrovica, 1 August 1951) was a Serbian politician and attorney.

Joksimović was born in Bačina, Kingdom of Serbia on 18 July 1893. He became politically active as a student in the Independent Radical Party and later within the Democratic Party. He was later elected into the National Assembly.

In August 1945 he became a member of the Temporary National Assembly of Yugoslavia. He led the Democratic Representatives Club within the assembly. The Democratic Party representatives eventually abandoned the assembly in September of that year.

Joksimović defended Draža Mihailović during the Belgrade Process. He was later imprisoned in 1949. Joksimović died in the Sremska Mitrovica prison on 1 August 1951.
