= Kosta Kumanudi =

Serbian politician (1874–1962)

Kosta Kumanudi Коста Кумануди
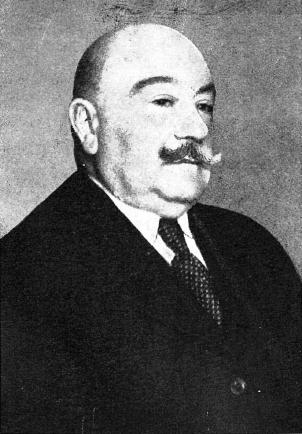

Mayor of Belgrade
- In office 22 August 1926 – 18 February 1929
- Preceded by: Dobra Mitrović
- Succeeded by: Miloš Savčić

Minister of Finance
- In office 17 January 1921 – 16 December 1922
- Prime Minister: Nikola Pašić
- Preceded by: Milorad Drašković
- Succeeded by: Milan Stojadinović

President of the National Assembly of the Kingdom of Yugoslavia
- In office December 1931 – February 1935
- Monarchs: Alexander I (to 9 October 1934); Peter II (from 9 October 1934)

Personal details
- Born: 22 November 1874 Belgrade, Principality of Serbia
- Died: 27 November 1962 (aged 88) Belgrade, FPR Yugoslavia
- Party: Democratic Party (Yugoslavia)
- Spouse: Unknown
- Relations: Aleksa "Lesa" Kumanudi (brother)
- Education: University of Belgrade

Konstantin Kosta Kumanudi (Serbian: Константин Коста Кумануди) (22 November 1874 – 27 November 1962) was a Serbian and Yugoslav politician. He was a member of the Democratic Party, and later with the Yugoslav Radical Peasant Democracy, forerunner to the Yugoslav National Party.

Kumanudi held a PhD in Political Sciences, and was also a professor of administrative law at the University of Belgrade's Law School, reserve Captain in the Balkan Wars, World War I and World War II, a deputy of the Democratic Party, President of the Belgrade municipality, the Minister of Finance, Education, Forest and Mining, Trade and Industry and Chairman of the National Assembly. He was a writer and political philosopher.

== Early life and education ==
Kumanudi came from a Greek family, which originated from Adrianople. His ancestors settled in Belgrade in 1823 or 1829. Konstantin, nicknamed Kosta, was born on 22 November 1874 in Belgrade, to Hermina, née Gruber, and Dimitrije Kumanudi. Some sources erroneously name his father as Atanasije.

He finished the gymnasium in Belgrade and the Legal section of the Belgrade's Great School. He then moved to Paris where he graduated at the École Libre des Sciences Politiques, also obtaining his PhD there in 1901.

After returning to Belgrade, Kumanudi first worked as a customs officer in 1902. Same year he was elected to the position of a docent for the administrative law at the Great School. In 1904 he was elected an associate professor while he became the full professor of public law at the Law School in 1920.

== Academic work ==
Kumanudi published his expert contributions in the Archive for the legal and social sciences. He was also Archive's editor for administrative law. He and Slobodan Jovanović published Basics of Public Law in the Kingdom of Serbia, Volumes I & II, in Belgrade in 1907 and 1909. He authored a textbook Administrative law, published in Belgrade in 1921.

His other legal works include International law among the South Slavs (1896; expanded translation of the lengthy study by Milenko Vesnić), Alliance treaties in the 19th century (1901), Administrative law (1909; 1920), Our jurisprudence, Tirgo, Legal position of the resigning ministers, View on Austrian role in the eastern question, etc. He was a contributor to the Serbian Literary Herald, Nova Evropa, Arhiv, Branič and other papers and magazines.

== Politics ==
Kumanudi was originally a member of the Democratic Party. On 20 July 1933 he switched to the Yugoslav National Party, which is often confused with the extremely right Yugoslav People's Party.

After World War I he was a member of the Serbian, and later SHS delegation to the Commission for the Reparations in Paris. As the SHS delegate, he participated in the sessions of the Assembly of the League of Nations in 1924 and 1927. He also represented Yugoslav parliament in the Inter-Parliamentary Union in Geneva.

He held numerous ministerial tenures in the newly created Kingdom of the Serbs, Croats and Slovenes, which was later renamed Yugoslavia. He helmed the ministries of finance (17 January 1921 – 16 December 1922), interior (acting; 30 July-14 August 1922), forestry and mining (17 April-21 September 1927), preparation for the constitutional assembly and laws equalization (acting; 17 April-16 June 1927), education (21 September 1927 – 23 February 1928), post and telegraphs (acting; 14 January-3 April 1929), without portfolio (3 April 1929 – 16 February 1931), construction (16 February-19 June 1931) and trade and industry (19 April 1931 – 6 January 1932).

As a finance minister, he drafted the first budget adopted in the Kingdom of the Serb, Croats and Slovenes parliament. He concluded the massive internal loan (500 million dinars at the time) in 1921 and promulgated the law on the tax equalization in 1922. He especially gained good reputation during his position as the finance minister, because of the highly favorable 1922 Blair loan in America, worth $100 million.

He was elected a deputy to the Constitutional Assembly in 1920 and, as a member of the Democratic Party, of the Parliament of Yugoslavia in 1923 and 1925 elections. He was a president of the parliament from December 1931 to February 1935. In that capacity he personally accompanied the widowed dowager queen Maria of Yugoslavia and the young king Peter II to the funeral of the assassinated king Alexander I.

Kumanudi withdrew from politics in 1938.

== Mayor of Belgrade ==
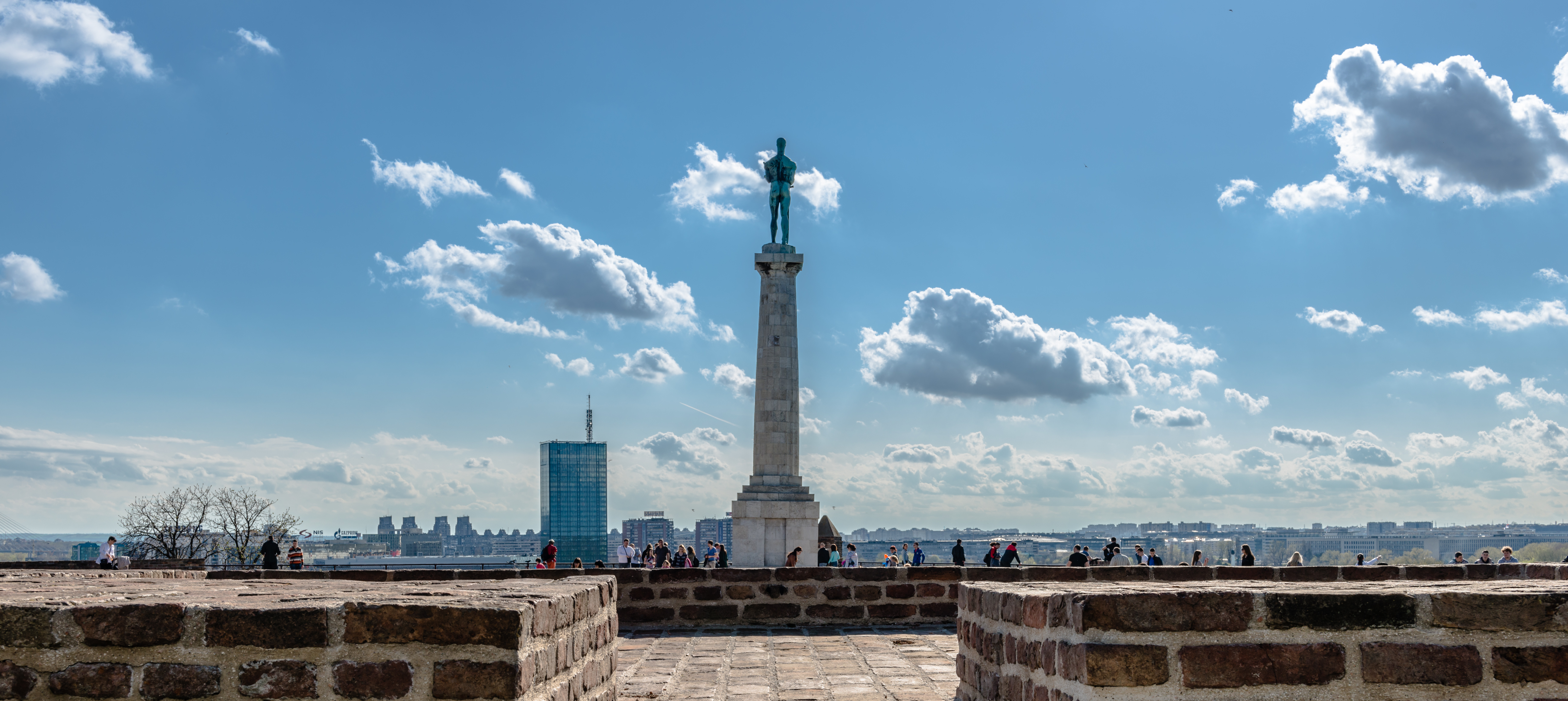
One of the major symbols of Belgrade today, the Pobednik monument, is the greatest legacy of Kumanudi as a mayor

Kumanudi was mayor of Belgrade from 22 August 1926 to 18 February 1929. As a mayor, he significantly enhanced and modernized the city.

=== Pobednik monument ===
His tenure, however, was marked by the scandal surrounding the erection of the Pobednik monument. The construction of the monument, originally named "Herald of the victory", dragged on since 1913 when the city decided to erect it. Various projects were made, including the placing of the monument in the fountain on Terazije, the central city square. As soon as he took over, Kumanudi pushed the project to finally get it done. When the construction of the foundations began in May 1927, the scandal broke out. Instigated by the author and jurist Petar Odavić, the campaign against the monument began.

Odavić published an article in the Vreme magazine, attacking the sculpture claiming it insults the moral of chaste Belgrade ladies, so as the memory on Serbian soldiers which it was to represent, by not having "symbols of the Serbian soldiers", like the šajkača hat or the opanak footwear. The debates and criticism ensued, including various women organizations, who protested against the sculpture of a fully naked man in city center. "Pobednik", sculptured by Ivan Meštrović, was defended by numerous members of Serbian academia, like Bogdan Popović, Stevan Hristić, Branislav Petronijević, Ksenija Atanasijević, Zora Petrović, Beta Vukanović or Stanislav Krakov, but also from certain women organizations and parts of the church.

Still, the Arts Commission, formed by the city, decided in September 1927 to relocate the monument and place it "on the ridge of the Belgrade Town, at the mouth of the Sava and the Danube". As Kumanudi had other duties in the state government, this decision was confirmed by his deputy Kosta Jovanović, and Kumanudi was neither aware or notified about it. Marking 10 years from the Salonica front, the monument was dedicated on 7 October 1928. In time, the "Pobednik" became a symbol of the city.

== World War II ==
Germany attacked Yugoslavia on 6 April 1941, occupied it and partitioned it. A collaborationist government, headed by Milan Aćimović, was installed in occupied Serbia. Though retired for several years, Kumanudi signed the Appeal to the Serbian Nation. The Appeal, published on 13 August 1941, though appeared to be gathering the population against the Bolshevism and Communism, actually was calling not to oppose the German occupation and to collaborate with the quisling governments of Aćimović and his successor Milan Nedić (Government of National Salvation).

Kumanudi, however, restrained from any further participation. During the war he took no part in political or public life in Serbia, nor he participated in the formation of Nedić's government or in the government itself. He was detained three times by the Gestapo and spent some time in the Banjica concentration camp in Belgrade. However, he was often asked for an advice by the administration.

== Post-war ==
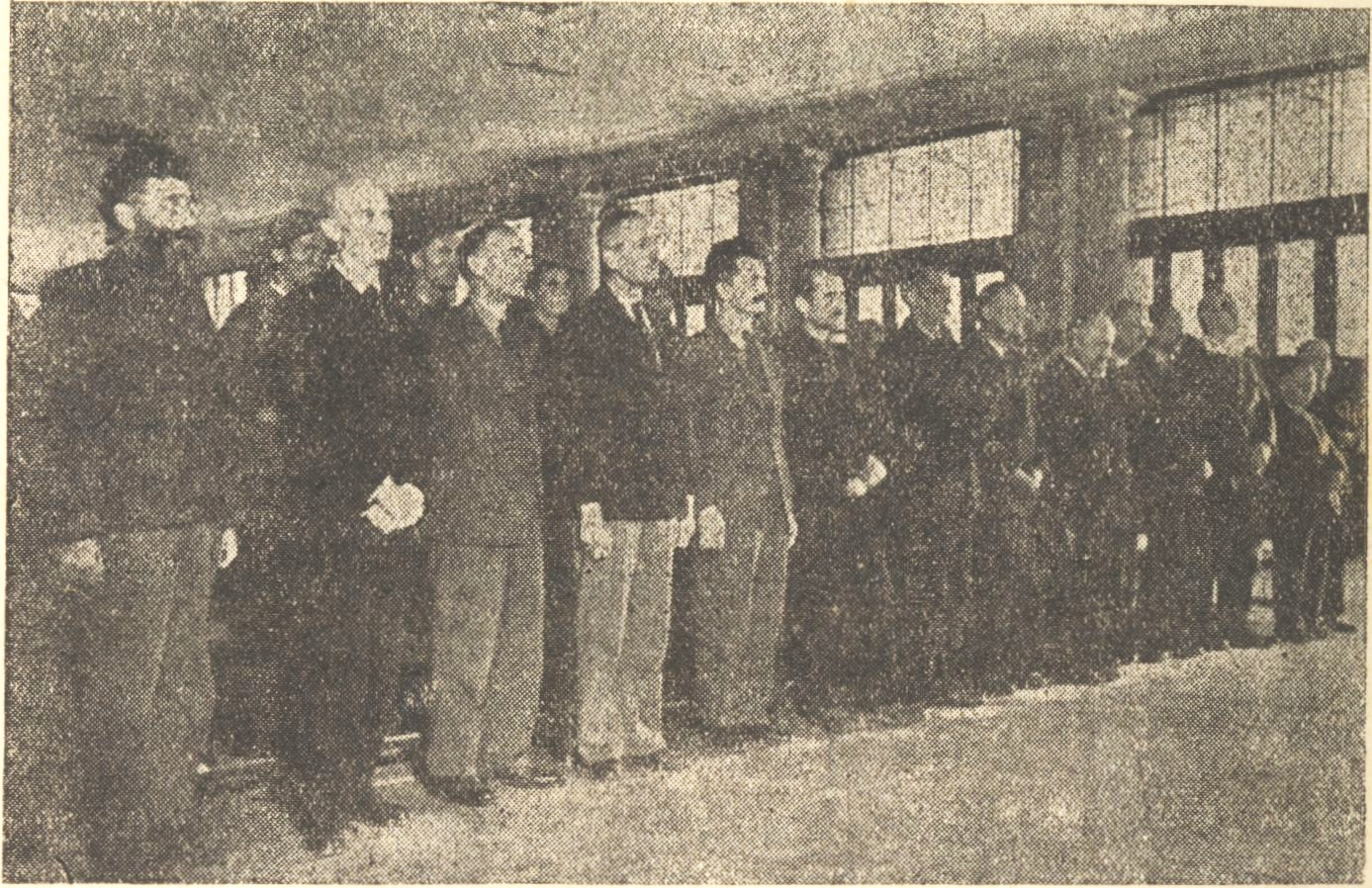
Sentencing at the Trial of Mihailović et al. Kumanudi is the first from the right

After the war, he was apprehended by the new Communist authorities. He was tried as part of the Belgrade Process and declared a "member of the pro-Fascist Yugoslav Radical Union, an extreme fascist and signer of the Nedić's Appeal". Because of his "open Fascism and betrayal of his people and country" he was sentenced to 18 months in jail. However, he was never a member of the Yugoslav Radical Union, nor the historiography confirms that he was an "extreme fascist". His entire estate was confiscated in 1946.

Kumanudi was imprisoned in the Sremska Mitrovica Prison, from 2 March 1946 to 3 November 1947. A year later, he was arrested again and accused of "joining the foundation of an illegal board in August 1948 in Belgrade, with the goal of rounding up of the elements hostile to the state and social organization". Military court sentenced him on 3 February 1951 to 10 years of hard labor with compulsory work and stripped him of his citizen rights for the next 2 years, except from the parental rights. He was sent back to Sremska Mitrovica on 24 June 1950, but due to the age and bad health, the sentence was reduced by 3 years in November 1953 and he was released on 6 November 1956.

Kumanudi was tortured in prison, but with "the smartness of an old politician", he managed to survive the imprisonment, despite his old age. He was even taken by the UDBA, the secret police, to their special section which dealt with the comments of the daily press, communiques, estimate of the political situation in the world, etc. His reports were noted for their "archaic style", especially his translations from the French language. His supervisors noted his "diligence", but historians define it as a "mimicry for survival".

He died on 27 November 1962 in Belgrade.

== Personal life ==
Kumanudi was known for having a "tactile and extremely nice" approach. He was described as having a "personality of aristocratic habitus". Kumanudi was a Freemason.

He married Milica, née Jovanović. They had three children, two sons and a daughter. Their older son, Stanislav Kumanudi, nicknamed Saško, was born in 1903, and worked as a lawyer. Their younger son, Ivan Kumanudi, was a clerk in the finance ministry, but was better known as an athlete. He was a footballer in the SK Jugoslavija football club.
