= Ba, Ljig =

Ba Ба
- Village (Selo)
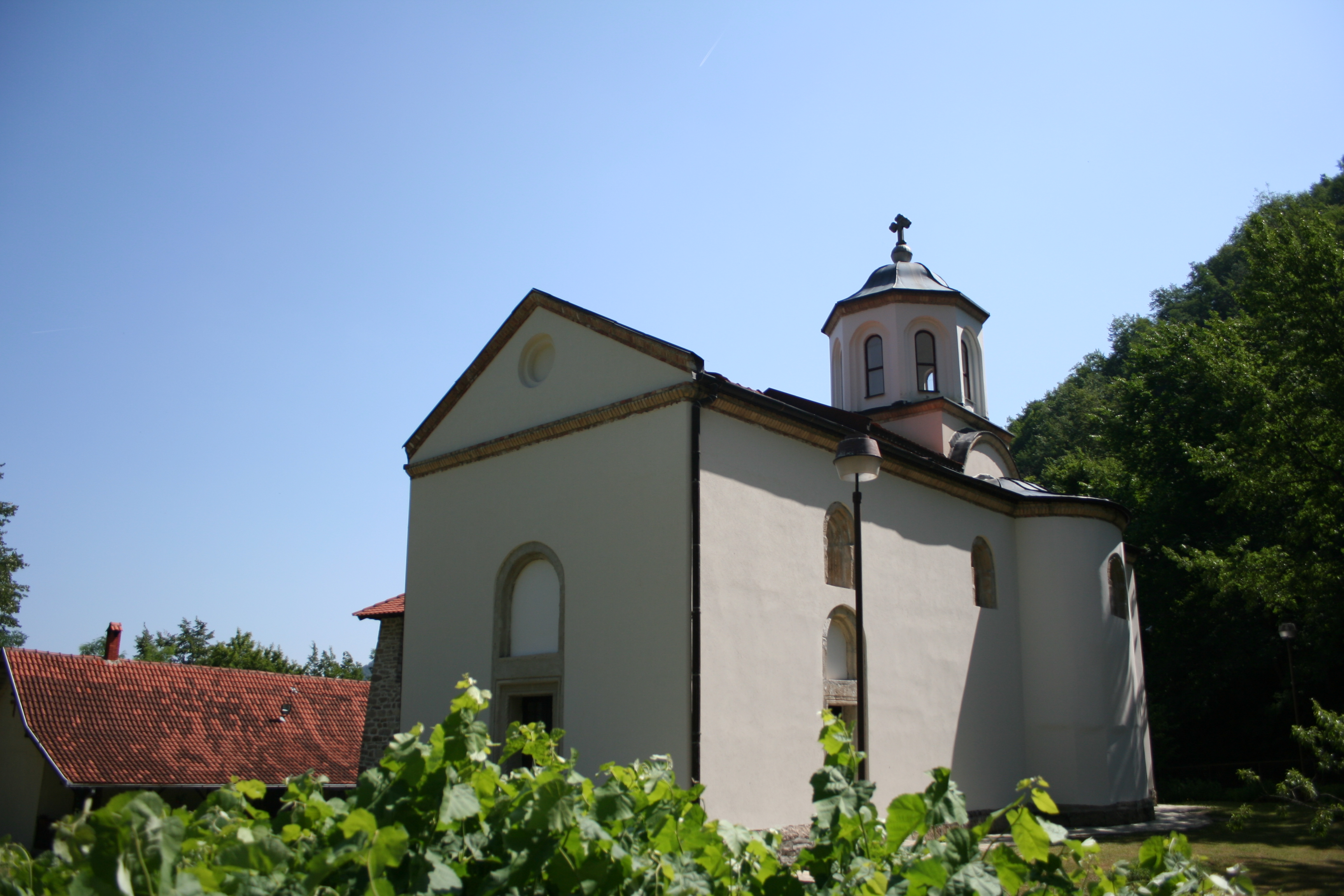
- Interactive map of Ba
- Location within Serbia
- Coordinates: 44°09′30″N 20°11′43″E
- Country: Serbia
- District: Kolubara District
- Municipality: Ljig
- Time zone: UTC+1 (CET)
  - Summer (DST): UTC+2 (CEST)

Ba (Serbian Cyrillic: Ба) is a village in the municipality of Ljig in central Serbia. According to the 2002 census, the village has a population of 605. It lies below Mount Suvobor.

During World War II, Ba was a stronghold of the Serbian royalist Chetnik movement. Between the 25th and 28th of January 1944, Chetniks led by Draža Mihailović met at Ba for discussions in what became known as the Ba Congress. For that reason the village was neglected by post-war Communist authorities.

== See also ==
- List of short place names
