= Mladen Žujović =

Serbian Attorney and Treasonist

- Младен Жујовић
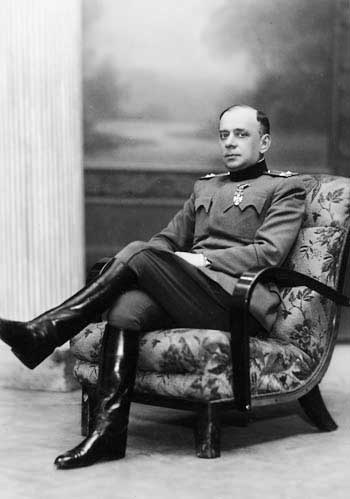
- Mladen Žujović in 1940
- Born: 5 June 1895; Belgrade, Serbia
- Died: 15 November 1969 (aged 74); Paris, France
- Military career
- Allegiance: Kingdom of Yugoslavia
- Branch: Chetniks
- Rank: Lieutenant Colonel
- Commands: Yugoslav Army units in Dalmatia, Lika and Western Bosnia and Herzegovina

Mladen Žujović (1895–1969) was a Serbian and Yugoslav attorney and professor of Law at Belgrade University. He was known as member of British-supported secret society Konspiracija and during the World War II as a member of the Central National Committee of the Kingdom of Yugoslavia and since 1943 commander of Yugoslav Army in the Fatherland in Dalmatia, Lika and Western Bosnia and Herzegovina.

== Biography ==
Žujović was born on 5 June 1895 in Belgrade, Kingdom of Serbia. He was attorney PhD and professor at Belgrade University.

On 8 August 1938 a secret society Konspiracija, established to perform a coup d'état and overthrow regime of Prince Pavle with support of United Kingdom had their first meeting presided by Slobodan Jovanović in a house of Žujović. Dragiša Vasić, Milan Žujović and Milan Nikolić were members of the Executive Council of the Conspiracy.

Together with Dragiša Vasić, Žujović created a plan to establish Central National Committee of the Kingdom of Yugoslavia (CNK). Žujović went to Belgrade to select candidates for membership of CNK. Eventually he recruited a number of people while he personally was a member of the CNK.

Since May 1943 he moved to Split. At the end of June 1943, Italians arrested Žujović in action against Chetniks coordinated with Germans who arrested Pavle Đurišić earlier. After he was appointed as a delegate of Draža Mihailović for Dalmatia, Lika and Western Bosnia and Herzegovina with rank of Lieutenant Colonel.

When Italian forces surrendered to communist forces in Dalmatia in the autumn of 1943 Žujović fled to Italy and then to Cairo. He was sentenced to death in absentia during the trial against Draza Mihailovic and his accomplices. Žujović died in Paris, France, 1969.

Thanks to Teodora Žujović the manuscripts of Mladen Žujović that he took with him as a refugee were published.

== Sources ==
- Stanišić, Mihailo (2000). Projekti "Velika Srbija". Službeni list SRJ. ISBN 9788635504681.
- Zečević, Momčilo (2003). Prošlost i vreme: iz istorije Jugoslavije. Prosveta. ISBN 9788607013937.
- Matić, Milan B.; Vesović, Milan (1995). Ravnogorska ideja u štampi i propagandi četničkog pokreta u Srbiji 1941-1944. ISI. ISBN 9788674030639.
- Latas, Branko (1979). Četnički pokret Draže Mihailovića: 1941-1945. Beogradski izdavačko-grafički zavod.
- Dedijer, Vladimir (1990). From November 28, 1942, to September 10, 1943. University of Michigan Press. ISBN 978-0-472-10109-2.
- Plećaš, Neđeljko; Dimitrijević, Bojan (2004). Ratne godine. Institut za savremenu istoriju. ISBN 9788674030912.
- Karchmar, Lucien (1973). Draža Mihailović and the Rise of the Četnik Movement, 1941-1942. Department of History, Stanford University.
