= Đuro Vilović =

Yugoslav publicist

- Born: 11 December 1889 Brela, Kingdom of Dalmatia, Austria-Hungary
- Died: 22 December 1958 (aged 69) Bjelovar, PR Croatia, FPR Yugoslavia
- Occupation: Writer
- Language: Croatian
- Period: Interwar

Đuro Vilović (11 December 1889 – 22 December 1958) was a Yugoslav publicist, one of the most widely read and controversial writers of Croatian interwar literature and a member of the Chetniks.

Initially, a Croatian nationalist and a Roman Catholic priest, Vilović left the Roman Catholic church, joining a Serbian nationalist Chetnik movement during World War II and becoming a close ally of Draža Mihailović, for which he was sentenced to 7 years in prison at the Belgrade Process in 1946 by the new communist regime. He died on 22 December 1958 in Bjelovar.

== Biography ==
Vilović completed gymnasium high school in Split and theology program in Zadar. Between 1913 and 1915 he was a Roman Catholic priest after which he went to study philosophy in Vienna. He was prosecuted for World War II collaboration after the end of the war.

== Literature works ==
Vilović was a significant author of Croatian literature. During the Interwar period, he was one of the most popular writers in Yugoslavia.

=== Novels ===
- Aesthete (1919)
- Međumurje (1923)
- Three Hours (1925)
- The Master of the Soul (1931)
- The Bell Mourned the Virgin (1938)

=== Short stories ===
- A Stale Life (1923)
- Mandorlato (1924)
- Croatian North and South (1930).
