= Anti-Fascist Council for the National Liberation of Yugoslavia =

World War II-era political body

Anti-Fascist Council for the National Liberation of Yugoslavia (AVNOJ)

Type
- Type: Unicameral

History
- Founded: 26 November 1942
- Disbanded: 29 November 1945
- Succeeded by: National Assembly

Leadership
- President: Ivan Ribar (KPJ)
- Seats: 77 (1942); 303 (1943); 357 (1945)

The Anti-Fascist Council for the National Liberation of Yugoslavia (Note: Serbo-Croatian: Antifašističko vijeće/veće narodnog oslobođenja Jugoslavije, Антифашистичко вијеће/веће народног ослобођења Југославије; Slovene: Antifašistični svet narodne osvoboditve Jugoslavije; Macedonian: Антифашистичко собрание за народно ослободување на Југославија, romanized: Antifašističko sobranie za narodno osloboduvanje na Jugoslavija, Bosnian: Antifašističko vijeće narodnog oslobođenja Jugoslavije), commonly abbreviated as the AVNOJ (Cyrillic АВНОЈ, AV-noy), was a deliberative and legislative body that was established in Bihać in November 1942. It was established by Josip Broz Tito, the leader of the Yugoslav Partisans, an armed resistance movement led by the Communist Party of Yugoslavia to resist the Axis occupation of the country during World War II.

The AVNOJ reconvened in Jajce in 1943 and in Belgrade in 1945, shortly after the war in Europe ended. Between the sessions, it operated through its presidency, its executive council, and the National Committee for the Liberation of Yugoslavia. The committee was granted authority normally wielded by cabinets. While Tito presided over the committee, the AVNOJ sessions and its presidency were chaired by Ivan Ribar. The second session of the AVNOJ proclaimed itself Yugoslavia's new legislative body and decided that it should be a multi-ethnic federal state.

By 1944, the Western Allies and the Yugoslav government-in-exile recognised the AVNOJ as the all-Yugoslav legislative body. The third session of the AVNOJ was convened in preparation of the Constituent Assembly when the Yugoslav Parliament was convened again in 1945. Decisions of the AVNOJ determined there would be six units in the federation and defined their borders. It also took over the position of the legitimate ruling body of Yugoslavia from the government-in-exile in dealings with the Allies.

== Background ==
=== Invasion and uprising ===
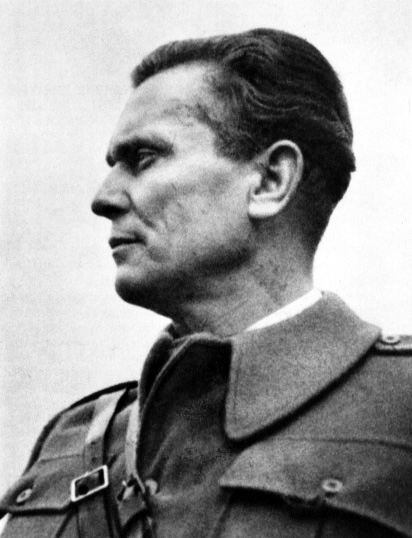
Josip Broz Tito led the Yugoslav Partisans as a resistance to Axis occupation of Yugoslavia

The Kingdom of Yugoslavia acceded to the Tripartite Pact on 25 March 1941 under pressure from Nazi Germany. The latter sought to protect its southern flank before the planned invasion of the Soviet Union, while ensuring the availability of transport routes and economic resources in the Balkans where the Greco-Italian War was in progress. In response to the pact, Royal Yugoslav Armed Forces generals staged a coup d'état deposing the government and Prince Regent Paul. Royal Yugoslav Air Force General Dušan Simović became the Prime Minister and the regency was abolished by declaring Peter II of Yugoslavia of age and thus the king even though he was only seventeen.

On 6 April 1941, the Axis powers invaded and quickly occupied Yugoslavia. Parts of the country were annexed by its neighbours, and the Independent State of Croatia (NDH) was carved out as a Ustaše-ruled Axis puppet state. With the country's defeat imminent, the Communist Party of Yugoslavia (KPJ) instructed its 8,000 members to stockpile weapons in anticipation of armed resistance. By the end of 1941, the armed resistance spread to all areas of the country except Macedonia. Building experience in clandestine operation across the country, the KPJ proceeded to organise the Yugoslav Partisans as resistance fighters led by Josip Broz Tito. The KPJ believed that the German invasion of the Soviet Union had created favourable conditions for an uprising. The KPJ politburo founded the Supreme Headquarters of the National Liberation Army of Yugoslavia with Tito as commander-in-chief on 27 June 1941 and the Partisans waged war against the occupying powers until 1945.

=== Government-in-exile ===
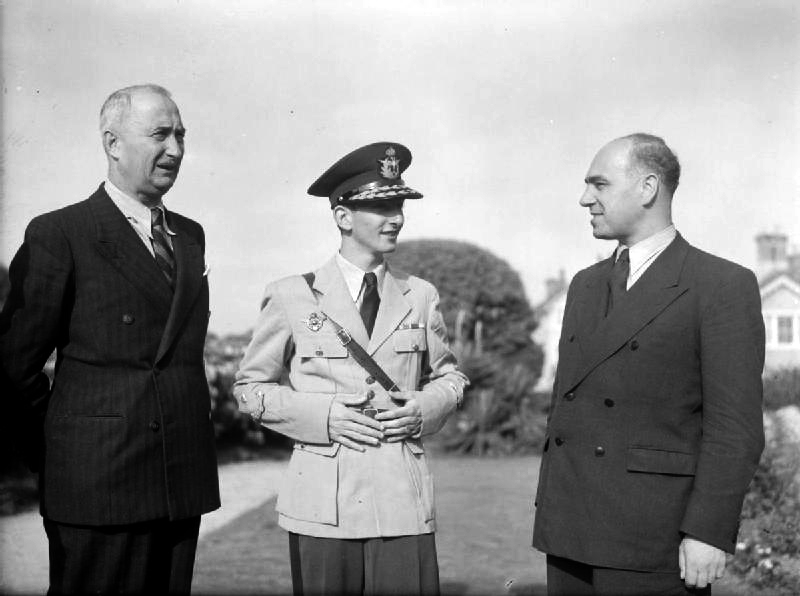
King Peter II of Yugoslavia (centre) with the prime minister of the government-in-exile Dušan Simović (left) and Royal Court Minister Radoje Knežević (right) in London in June 1941 shortly after fleeing Yugoslavia

King Peter II and the government fled Yugoslavia in April 1941 when it became apparent the royal army would not be able to defend the country. The decision to abandon organised armed resistance put the Yugoslav government-in-exile in a weak position, further eroded by political differences between ministers. The government, an extension of the post-coup government led by Simović, based its legitimacy on the 1931 Yugoslav Constitution, which made it responsible to the king. It lost three Croatian Peasant Party (HSS) ministers including the party's leader and the deputy prime minister Vladko Maček, who resigned and stayed in the country. The HSS thus split and lost influence. Džafer Kulenović, the only minister drawn from the Yugoslav Muslim Organization, also resigned.

The government-in-exile was split along an ethnic line separating the HSS from a bloc of Serb ministers drawn from several disunited parties. The divisions deepened because the HSS ministers were reluctant to publicly discuss and condemn Ustaše atrocities against Serbs in late 1941. In January 1942, Simović was replaced by Slobodan Jovanović and his decision to support the Chetniks widened the rift with the HSS ministers. Jovanović saw the Chetniks as a guerrilla force promising the restoration of the monarchy after the war. In combination with fear of communism, this led him to ignore information about Chetnik collaboration with the Axis powers, and appoint their leader Draža Mihailović the Minister of the Army, Navy and Air Forces. At the same time, the government promoted Mihailović to Army General and formally renamed the Chetniks the "Yugoslav Army in the Homeland". In June 1943, Jovanović resigned, unable to reunite the ministers, and his replacement Miloš Trifunović also resigned after less than two months. In August, Božidar Purić was appointed the prime minister of a largely administrative government mostly composed of civil servants, although Mihailović retained his ministerial position.

== First session ==
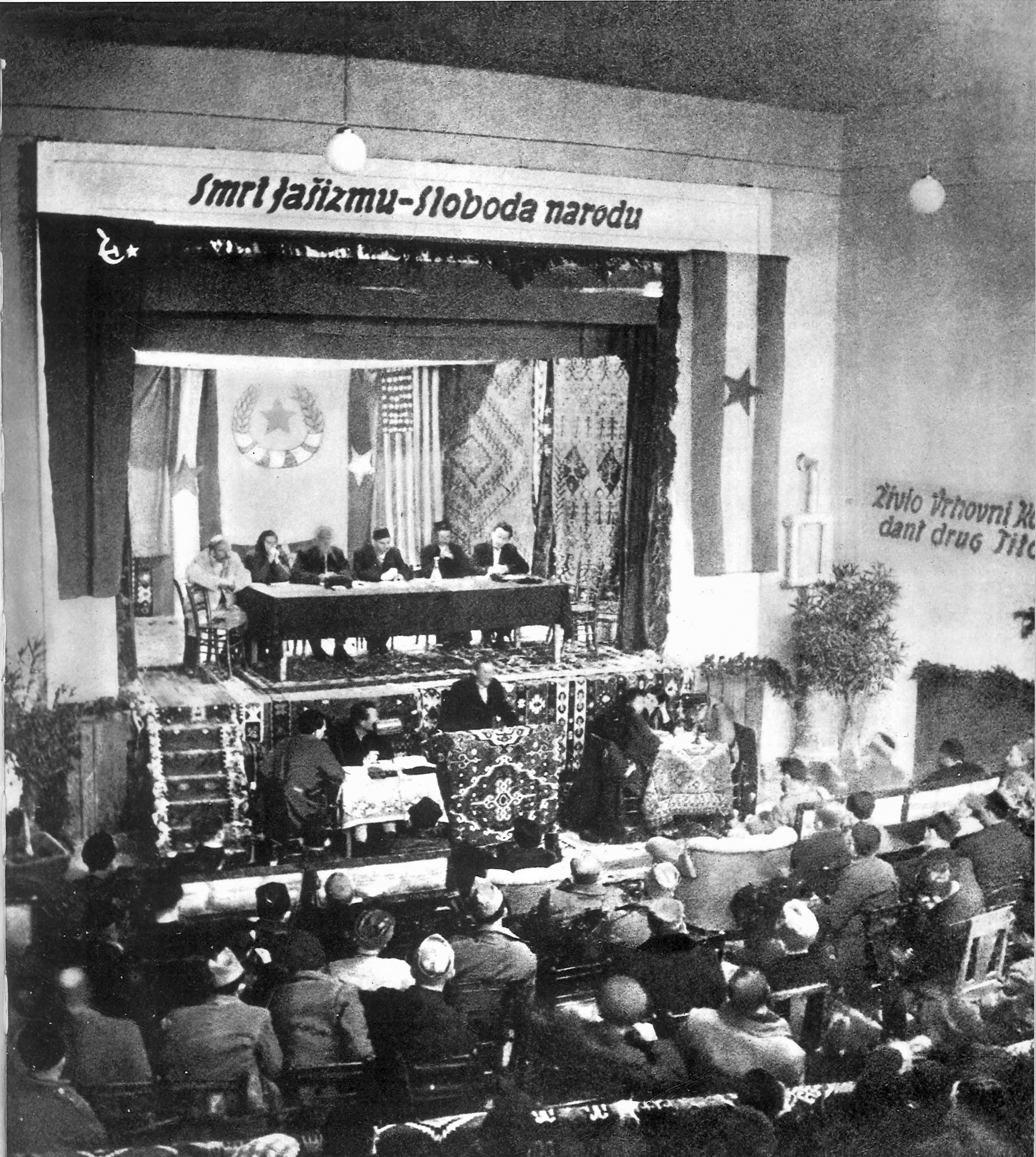
An image of the first session of the AVNOJ

In November 1942, the Partisans captured Bihać and secured control over a large part of western Bosnia, Dalmatia and Lika, which they called the Bihać Republic. On 26 and 27 November, the pan-Yugoslav Anti-Fascist Council for the National Liberation of Yugoslavia (AVNOJ) was established in the town at the initiative of Tito and the KPJ. At its founding session, the AVNOJ adopted the principle of a multi-ethnic federal state as the basis for the country's future government but did not officially determine what system of government would be implemented after the war. There was a degree of ambiguity regarding the number of future federal units and whether they would all have equal status within the federation.

The AVNOJ also did not mention the international recognition of the London-based Yugoslav government-in-exile, backed by the Western Allies; Soviet leader Joseph Stalin did not wish to antagonise the Allies by supporting the Partisans. Shortly before the Bihać session, Tito added the expression "Anti-Fascist" to the original name of the AVNOJ to emphasise its temporary and anti-Axis nature. These steps were made in response to Soviet positions expressed in correspondence in July–November 1942 between the KPJ and Moscow. The Comintern urged Tito to establish a political body solely to liberate the country and not to oppose the Yugoslav monarchy. The Soviets asked the AVNOJ not to openly advance a communist agenda in order to avoid antagonising the Western Allies, and cautioned against appointing Tito president of the AVNOJ.

AVNOJ delegates represented specific parts of Yugoslavia: seventeen for Bosnia and Herzegovina, fifteen for Croatia, fourteen each for Serbia and Montenegro, eight for Slovenia, six for the Sandžak, and three for Vojvodina. This distribution reflected the number of Partisans from each part of the country taking part in the armed struggle. Some of the selected delegates, including all of those representing Slovenia and Vojvodina and twelve others, did not arrive. The Slovene delegation informed the AVNOJ of its support by telegram. Macedonia was not represented at all. The AVNOJ elected its presidency with Ivan Ribar as president and Pavle Savić and Nurija Pozderac as vice-presidents. Ribar had been the first President of the Constitutional Assembly of the Kingdom of Serbs, Croats and Slovenes, which was later renamed Yugoslavia.

The AVNOJ also appointed an executive council presided by Ribar. It had three vice-presidents—Edvard Kocbek, Nurija Pozderac, and Pavle Savić—and six other members: Mladen Iveković (social affairs), Veselin Masleša (propaganda), Simo Milošević (health), Ivan Milutinović (economy), Mile Peruničić (internal affairs), and Vlada Zečević (religious affairs). The executive council was not formally considered a government, and Tito told the Bihać session of the AVNOJ that a government could not be formed for international reasons. Instead, he described the executive council as a political instrument to mobilise people.

After the Bihać meeting, land councils were established as political bodies representative of what was expected to be individual parts of the future federation. In January 1943, the executive council of the AVNOJ announced the "People's Liberation Loan", an attempt to raise half a billion kuna for the Partisan cause. The NDH's Ustaše regime launched a propaganda campaign in November 1942 to discredit the AVNOJ and portray the Partisans' struggle as pro-Serb and anti-Croat. The campaign, which declined after March 1943, involved the publication of brochures and newspaper articles as well as several rallies. Serb participation in the uprisings was highlighted while Croat or Bosnian Muslim AVNOJ participants were either not mentioned, labelled traitors, or misnamed. Ribar's name was misrepresented as Slovene-sounding "Janez Ribar".

Tito describes the purpose of AVNOJ in his work The Yugoslav peoples fight for freedom in 1944:

In the autumn of 1942, when the greater part of Yugoslavia had been liberated, the necessity arose for establishing a central political body for all Yugoslavia to direct all these committees [former local authorities] and to relieve the High Command of various political functions which had been constantly piling up through the force of circumstance. It was decided to convene an Antifascist Veće, or assembly, of the People's Liberation Movement of Yugoslavia. It will be remembered that the Veće met on November 26, 1942, in the town of Bihać and was attended by delegates representing all the peoples of Yugoslavia. Far-reaching historical decisions were adopted and an executive committee was elected. The Veće represented all anti-fascist parties and united all political trends, regardless of religion and nationality. The Veće was charged with mobilizing all means for helping the People's Liberation Army and with continuing to organize People's Liberation Committees, not only in liberated sectors but in territory still occupied by the enemy.

Liberation councils tasked with electing AVNOJ delegates
Name	Established
Main National Liberation Committee for Serbia	November 1941*
State Anti-fascist Council for the National Liberation of Croatia (ZAVNOH)	June 1943
Slovene National Liberation Committee (SNOS)	October 1943
State Anti-fascist Council for the National Liberation of Montenegro and Boka (ZAVNOCGB)	November 1943
State Anti-fascist Council for the National Liberation of Bosnia and Herzegovina (ZAVNOBiH)	November 1943
Main National Liberation Committee for Vojvodina	November 1943
Country Antifascist Council for the People's Liberation of the Sanjak (ZASNOS)	November 1943
Anti-fascist Assembly for the National Liberation of Macedonia (ASNOM)	August 1944
*Established during the existence of the Užice Republic

== Second session ==
=== Delegates ===
After Italy defected to the Allies and Western Allied forces advanced towards Yugoslavia, Tito announced another session of the AVNOJ. Since the previous session, the Western Allies began to support the Partisans, and Tito considered a British landing in Yugoslavia likely. In October 1943, just before the second session, the KPJ central committee established the National Committee for the Liberation of Yugoslavia (NKOJ), an all-Yugoslav executive body, appointed to perform the role of an interim government.

The AVNOJ reconvened in Jajce on 29 and 30 November 1943; Ribar chaired the meeting as president of the executive council. The KPJ originally planned for the second session of the AVNOJ to be attended by 250 delegates elected by regional land councils. The number of delegates was subsequently increased by 53 to include delegates from Macedonia and the Sandžak. In total, 78 delegates were to be elected in Croatia, 53 in Bosnia and Herzegovina, 53 in Serbia, 42 in Slovenia, 42 in Macedonia, 16 in Montenegro, 11 in Sandžak, and 8 in Vojvodina. Of the planned 303, 142 delegates arrived by the start of the session and 163 deputy delegates also attended the session. No deputies from Sandžak or Macedonia were present. The Main National Liberation Committee for Serbia was unable to hold elections because of the German occupation of Serbia. Instead, the Serbian delegates were appointed by individual Partisan units originally from Serbia; as a result, eastern Yugoslavia was underrepresented.

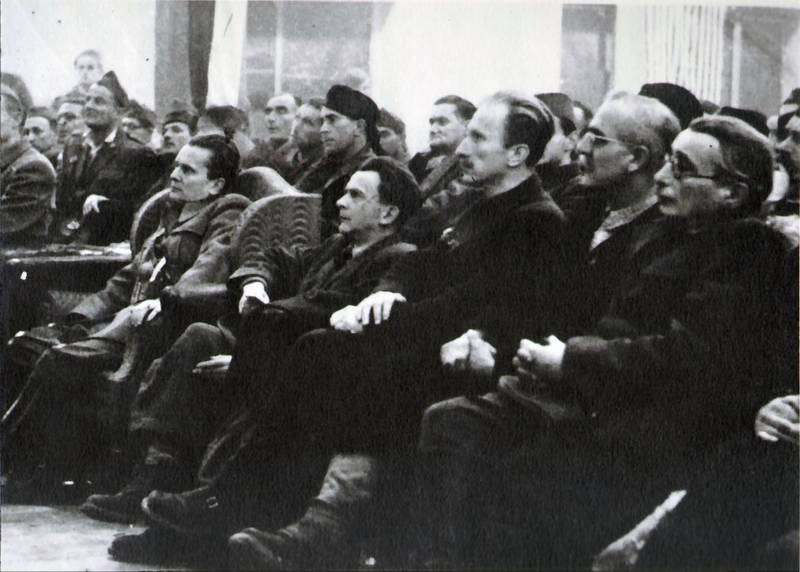
An image of the second session of the AVNOJ: Josip Broz Tito, Josip Vidmar, Edvard Kocbek, Josip Rus and Moša Pijade

Delegates elected to the second session of the AVNOJ
Region	Delegate quota	Attending delegates	Attending deputies
Croatia	78	37	67
Bosnia and Herzegovina	53	46	43
Serbia	53	24*	–
Slovenia	42	17	42
Macedonia	42	–	–
Montenegro	16	16	11
Sandžak	11	–	–
Vojvodina	8	2	–
Total	303	142	163
*Appointed by Serbian Partisan units

=== Building blocks for a new state ===
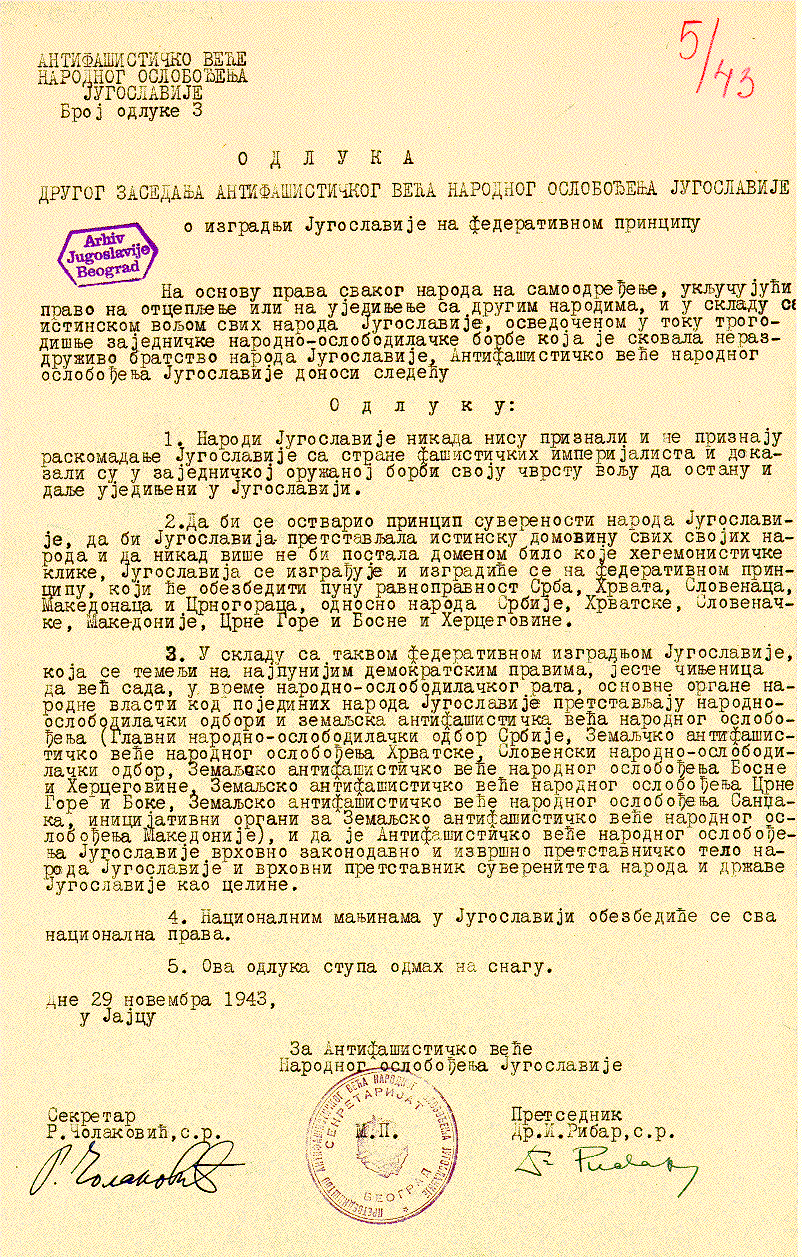
AVNOJ decision to build a new Yugoslavia as a federation to ensure equality of its nations

The AVNOJ made several decisions of the highest political and constitutional significance. It declared itself the supreme legislative body in the country and the representation of Yugoslav sovereignty; affirmed a commitment to forming a democratic federation; and recognised the equal standing of Bosnia and Herzegovina, Croatia, Macedonia, Montenegro, Serbia and Slovenia in the future federation. Only Sandžak was listed with other lower-ranked regional entities, even though its land council was still included among the "seven basic bodies of people's government". Though the position of individual nations and regions were not further elaborated, the second session of the AVNOJ determined the type of federal system to be introduced in Yugoslavia, modelling it on the Soviet Union.

Tito's views prevailed over the model adopted by the State Anti-fascist Council for the National Liberation of Croatia and the Communist Party of Croatia (KPH), a nominally independent part of the KPJ established in Croatia. The KPH leader Andrija Hebrang advocated a loose Yugoslav federation where communist parties and bodies established in federal units would be sovereign. In contrast, Tito's vision for the federal units was as administrative divisions only. Hebrang was replaced in late 1944 by Vladimir Bakarić, who aligned the KPH's views on federalism to Tito's.

The AVNOJ also denied the legitimacy of the Yugoslav government-in-exile and forbade the return of King Peter II to the country until its people could decide on the future of the monarchy after the war. It also declared all agreements previously concluded by the government-in-exile to be subject to review and approval, renegotiation or cancellation while declaring any further agreements concluded by the government-in-exile void. Furthermore, the AVNOJ declared that Yugoslavia had never accepted the 1941 partition. Finally, Tito was awarded the rank of Marshal of Yugoslavia.

The AVNOJ elected a new presidency consisting of sixty-three members, chaired by Ribar. Five vice-presidents were appointed: Antun Augustinčić, Moša Pijade, Josip Rus, Dimitar Vlahov, and Marko Vujačić. Radonja Golubović and Rodoljub Čolaković were appointed secretaries of the presidency. Some of the AVNOJ delegates were non-Communists so the presidency included some non-Communist members of the pre-war HSS and the Independent Democratic Party. The NKOJ was confirmed in the role of the government. Tito was appointed the president of the NKOJ and had three vice-presidents. Two were KPJ members Edvard Kardelj and Vladislav S. Ribnikar, and the remaining one was Božidar Magovac of the HSS. Finally, the AVNOJ formally praised and thanked Tito's Supreme Headquarters, and the Partisan forces for their armed struggle.

Members of the National Committee for the Liberation of Yugoslavia (NKOJ)
Name	notes, portfolio
Josip Broz Tito	president, defence
Edvard Kardelj	vice-president
Božidar Magovac	vice-president
Vladislav S. Ribnikar	vice-president, information
Sulejman Filipović	forests and ores
Frane Frol	judiciary
Milivoj Jambrišak	health
Edvard Kocbek	education
Anton Kržišnik	social policy
Ivan Milutinović	economy
Mile Peruničić	nutrition
Rade Pribičević	construction
Josip Smodlaka	foreign affairs
Dušan Sernec	finance
Todor Vujasinović	economic reconstruction
Vlada Zečević	internal affairs
Sreten Žujović	transport

=== Allied recognition and developments in 1944 ===
Coat of arms of the Democratic Federal Yugoslavia. The date at the bottom marks the second session of the AVNOJ.

On 15 January 1944, the AVNOJ introduced multilingualism to its proceedings, deciding to publish its official work in Serbian, Croatian, Slovene and Macedonian. In February, the AVNOJ and the NKOJ adopted a new emblem of the future federation at Tito's request. The emblem consisted of five lit torches burning as one flame representing five united nations; this was framed by sheaves, topped by a red five-pointed star, and crossed by a blue stripe bearing the name of the country, Democratic Federal Yugoslavia.

Stalin was enraged by the AVNOJ's rejection of Soviet advice in its establishment of the NKOJ as an interim government and explicit repudiation of the government-in-exile. Stalin was specifically worried about Tito's assumption of the presidency of the NKOJ and his elevation to the rank of Marshal. He thought that this would signal to the Western Allies that the KPJ was actually fighting for a revolution. Stalin was further angered by the fact that he received no prior notice of the decisions.

To Stalin's surprise, the Western Allies did not strongly oppose the AVNOJ's decisions. The flow of British equipment and arms to the Partisans, which had started in the second half of 1943 on the basis of the Churchill's Mediterranean strategy, continued. Only days after the AVNOJ's second session, the Allies recognised the Partisans as an Allied force at the Tehran Conference, and cut off further aid to the Chetniks. On British Prime Minister Winston Churchill's urging, the government-in-exile led by Ivan Šubašić and the Tito-led NKOJ signed the Treaty of Vis on 16 June 1944; the government-in-exile recognised the AVNOJ in return for the NKOJ's pledge to postpone the decision on the constitution of Yugoslavia until after the war. Tito and Šubašić concluded another agreement on 1 November in Belgrade; Šubašić confirmed AVNOJ as Yugoslavia's legislative body and agreed to form a new 18-person government. Six of the members would come from the government-in-exile and twelve would be NKOJ members. The second session of the AVNOJ also drew a response from the Chetnik leadership. At the Ba Congress held in January 1944, they proposed an alternative solution for the post-war government. The congress also condemned the AVNOJ in line with the contemporary Chetnik propaganda as a product of collaboration of Communists and Ustaše against Serbs.

=== Persecution of Germans ===
On 21 November 1944, the presidency of the AVNOJ declared the Germans of Yugoslavia to be collectively guilty for the war and enemies of Yugoslavia. Germans in Partisan-controlled areas were interned. Prior to 1944, about half a million Germans lived in Yugoslavia. About 240,000 were evacuated before the arrival of the Red Army, another 150,000 were later deported to the USSR to work as forced labour, 50,000 died in Yugoslav-run labor camps and 15,000 were killed by the Partisans. Most of the others were expelled from Yugoslavia and German property was confiscated. By the time of 1948 census, fewer than 56,000 ethnic Germans remained.

== Third session ==
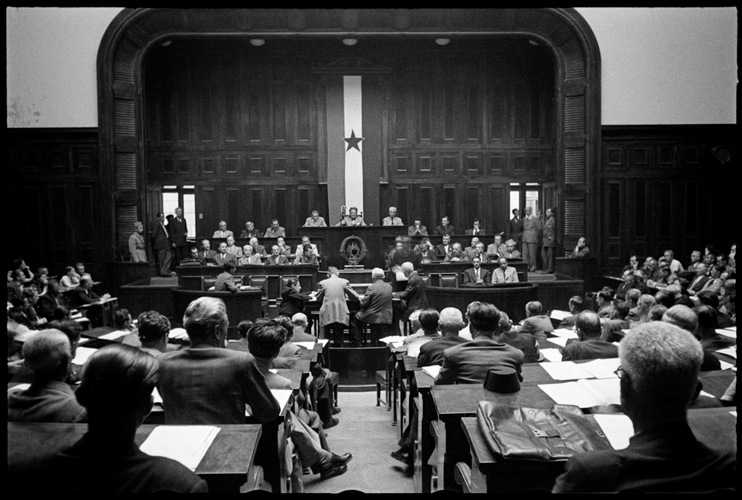
The final session of the AVNOJ was held in Belgrade in 1945.

At Allied suggestion, in February 1945 the AVNOJ was expanded to include members drawn from Serbia, Montenegro and Kosovo-Metohija, which had not been represented at its second session. The AVNOJ was expanded again in late March to include 54 members of the pre-war Yugoslav Parliament as required by the Tito–Šubašić Agreement. At the Yalta Conference, Churchill and Stalin discussed the decisions made by the AVNOJ; they agreed to demand ratification of all AVNOJ's decisions by the future Yugoslav Constitutional Assembly.

In February 1945, the presidency of the AVNOJ concluded that the Sandžak should not be one of federal units of Yugoslavia. In turn, the Anti-Fascist Council for the People's Liberation of Sandžak divided the region along the pre-1912 Serbia–Montenegro border and dissolved itself. The Anti-Fascist Parliament for the People's Liberation of Serbia (ASNOS) held its first regular session between 7 and 9 April, and voted in favour of annexation of Vojvodina, Kosovo and a part of Sandžak. The People's Liberation Council for the Kosovo-Metohija Oblasts held its first regular session between 8 and 10 July, and a corresponding body of Vojvodina met on 30 and 31 July; both bodies decided the region they represented would join Serbia. All of these decisions were confirmed at the third session of the AVNOJ in August 1945. By the end of the month, the AVNOJ discussed and decided on changes to the borders of all Yugoslav federal units based on corresponding pre-1941 and pre-1918 borders.

The third session of the AVNOJ was held in Belgrade between 7 and 26 August 1945 as a part of preparation of the Constitutional Assembly. It was again presided over by Ribar, and held in the Yugoslav Parliament building. A parliamentary election was held on 11 November and the Constitutional Assembly convened on 29 November 1945. The Assembly went on to ratify the decisions previously made by the AVNOJ.

== Legacy ==
The AVNOJ defined the intra-Yugoslav borders between constituent republics of the federation.

The AVNOJ resulted in a defeat of Serbian nationalism. In the pre-war Kingdom of Yugoslavia, Serbia was in a dominant position. In comparison to the pre-war situation as well as the territory held by the Kingdom of Serbia before World War I, Serbia lost Macedonia and Montenegro. The AVNOJ established Bosnia and Herzegovina as an equal member of the Yugoslav federation, establishing and confirming borders separating Serbs living in those regions and in Croatia from Serbia. Those borders are sometimes referred to as the "AVNOJ borders".

In 1945, this situation caused concerns among Serbs who feared being divided among multiple Yugoslav constituent republics. In response, Tito and the Yugoslav regime employed rhetoric designed to diminish the apparent significance of the intra-Yugoslav borders. Although the AVNOJ borders were originally drawn as administrative boundaries, they gained importance with subsequent decentralisation and the breakup of Yugoslavia. Serbian irredentism across the AVNOJ borders was a contributing factor in the 1990 Serb revolt in Croatia and the 1992–1995 Bosnian War.

The second session of the AVNOJ was celebrated in post-war Yugoslavia as the birth of the country and the event was commemorated annually on 29 and 30 November as a two-day national holiday. Museums have been established in the buildings which hosted the first and the second sessions of the AVNOJ.

== Sources ==
- Banac, Ivo (1988). With Stalin against Tito: Cominformist Splits in Yugoslav Communism. Ithaca, New York: Cornell University Press. ISBN 0-8014-2186-1.
- Batović, Ante (2010). "Zapadne reakcije na objavu Deklaracije o nazivu i položaju hrvatskoga književnog jezika 1967. godine" [Western Reactions to Publication of the Declaration Concerning the Name and Position of the Croatian Literary Language in 1967]. Časopis za suvremenu povijest (in Croatian). 42 (3). Zagreb, Croatia: Croatian Institute of History: 579–594. ISSN 0590-9597.
- Calic, Marie-Janine (2019). A History of Yugoslavia. West Lafayette, Indiana: Purdue University Press. ISBN 978-1-55753-838-3.
- Đilas, Aleksa (1991). The Contested Country: Yugoslav Unity and Communist Revolution, 1919–1953. Cambridge, Massachusetts: Harvard University Press. ISBN 9780674166981.
- Helfant Budding, Audrey (2007). "Nation/People/Republic: Self-Determination in Socialist Yugoslavia". In Cohen, Lenard J.; Dragović-Soso, Jasna (eds.). State Collapse in South-Eastern Europe: New Perspectives on Yugoslavia's Disintegration. West Lafayette, Indiana: Purdue University Press. pp. 91–130. ISBN 978-1-55753-461-3.
- Hoare, Marko Attila (2010). "The War of Yugoslav Succession". In Ramet, Sabrina P. (ed.). Central and Southeast European Politics since 1989. Cambridge, UK: Cambridge University Press. pp. 111–136. ISBN 978-0-521-88810-3.
- Hoare, Marko Attila (2011). "The Partisans and the Serbs". In Ramet, Sabrina P.; Listhaug, Ola (eds.). Serbia and the Serbs in World War Two. London, UK: Palgrave Macmillan. pp. 201–224. ISBN 978-1-349-32611-2.
- Hoare, Marko Attila (2013). The Bosnian Muslims in the Second World War. Oxford, UK: Oxford University Press. ISBN 978-0-231-70394-9.
- Irvine, Jill (2007). "The Croatian Spring and the Dissolution of Yugoslavia". In Cohen, Lenard J.; Dragović-Soso, Jasna (eds.). State Collapse in South-Eastern Europe: New Perspectives on Yugoslavia's Disintegration. West Lafayette, Indiana: Purdue University Press. pp. 149–178. ISBN 978-1-55753-461-3.
- Karaula, Željko (2013). "Pogledi ustaških medija prema partizanskim zasjedanjima "srpskog" AVNOJ-a" [The Opinions of the Ustasha Media Towards the Partisan Sessions of the "Serb" AVNOJ]. Historijska Traganja (in Bosnian) (12). Sarajevo, Bosnia and Herzegovina: Institut za istoriju: 141–154. ISSN 1840-3875.
- Lukic, Renéo; Lynch, Allen (1996). Europe from the Balkans to the Urals: The Disintegration of Yugoslavia and the Soviet Union. Stockholm, Sweden: Stockholm International Peace Research Institute. ISBN 9780198292005.
- Luthar, Breda; Pušnik, Maruša (2010). Remembering Utopia: The Culture of Everyday Life in Socialist Yugoslavia. Washington, D.C.: New Academia Publishing. ISBN 978-0-9844062-3-4.
- Mahmutović, Džafer (1988). "Regionalni muzej Pounja Bihać" [Una Valley Regional Museum in Bihać]. Informatica Museologica (in Croatian). 19 (1–2). Zagreb, Croatia: Muzejski dokumentacijski centar: 75–76. ISSN 0350-2325.
- Pijade, Moša, ed. (1953). Прво и друго заседање Антифашистичког већа народног ослобођења Југославије (26 и 27 новембра 1942, 29 и 30 новембра 1943) по стенографским белешкама и другим изворима [The First and the Second Sessions of the Anti-Fascist Council for the National Liberation of Yugoslavia (26–27 November 1942, 29–30 November 1943) According to Shorthand Records and Other Sources] (in Serbian). Belgrade: Presidium of the National Assembly of the Federative People's Republic of Yugoslavia. OCLC 632104149.
- Ramet, Sabrina P. (2006). The Three Yugoslavias: State-building and Legitimation, 1918–2005. Bloomington, Indiana: Indiana University Press. ISBN 9780253346568.
- Roberts, Walter R. (1973). Tito, Mihailović and the Allies: 1941–1945. New Brunswick, New Jersey: Duke University Press. ISBN 978-0-8223-0773-0.
- Swain, Geoffrey (2011). Tito: A Biography. London, UK: I.B.Tauris & Co. Ltd. ISBN 978-1-84511-727-6.
- Tomasevich, Jozo (1969). "Yugoslavia During the Second World War". In Vucinich, Wayne S. (ed.). Contemporary Yugoslavia: Twenty Years of Socialist Experiment. Berkeley, California: University of California Press. pp. 59–118. ISBN 9780520331105.
- Tomasevich, Jozo (1975). War and Revolution in Yugoslavia, 1941–1945: The Chetniks. Stanford, California: Stanford University Press. ISBN 978-0-8047-0857-9.
- Tomasevich, Jozo (2001). War and Revolution in Yugoslavia, 1941–1945: Occupation and Collaboration. Stanford, California: Stanford University Press. ISBN 978-0-8047-0857-9.
- Trgo, Fabijan, ed. (1982). Zbornik dokumenata i podataka o narodnooslobodilačkom ratu naroda Jugoslavije [Collection of Documents and Information on the Peoples' Liberation War of the Peoples of Yugoslavia] (in Serbo-Croatian). Vol. 2/13. Belgrade: Vojnoistorijski institute (Institute of Military History). OCLC 456199333.
- Vukšić, Velimir (2003). Tito's Partisans 1941–45. Oxford, UK: Osprey Publishing. ISBN 1-84176-675-5.
- Walasek, Helen (2015). "Destruction of the Cultural Heritage in Bosnia-Herzegovina: An Overview". In Walasek, Helen (ed.). Bosnia and the Destruction of Cultural Heritage. Farnham, UK: Ashgate Publishing Limited. pp. 23–142. ISBN 9781409437048.
- "Dom Narodne skupštine Republike Srbije" [House of the National Assembly of the Republic of Serbia] (in Serbian). Belgrade, Serbia: National Assembly (Serbia). Archived from the original on 14 October 2020.
