= Milan Grol =

Serbian literary critic, historian and politician

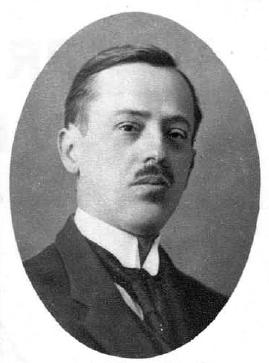

Deputy Prime Minister of the Provisional Government of the Democratic Federal Yugoslavia
- In office 7 March 1945 – 18 August 1945
- Preceded by: Office established
- Succeeded by: Office abolished

Ministry of Foreign Affairs (Yugoslavia)
- In office 26 June 1943 – 10 August 1943
- Monarch: Peter II
- Prime Minister: Miloš Trifunović
- Preceded by: Slobodan Jovanovic
- Succeeded by: Božidar Purić

Personal details
- Born: 12 September 1876 Belgrade, Principality of Serbia
- Died: 3 December 1952 (aged 76) Belgrade, PR Serbia, Yugoslavia
- Party: Democratic Party (Yugoslavia)
- Spouse(s): Ljubica Rakic, daughter of Dimitrije Mita Rakić (m.1898–1929), Nikolina Simović, daughter of Dušan Simović (m.1940–1952)
- Education: University of Belgrade

Milan Grol (12 September 1876 – 3 December 1952) was a Serbian literary critic, historian and politician. He was also director of the National Theatre in Belgrade.

== Biography ==
Milan Grol was born in Belgrade on 12 September 1876. He completed his studies at the University of Belgrade Faculty of Philosophy in 1899 and then taught for a year at a secondary school. Afterwards, he moved to Paris and spent two years there studying literature, theatre and art. He returned to Serbia in 1902 and found work as a teacher at the National Theatre in Belgrade. Alongside writers such as Jovan Skerlić, Radoje Domanović and Stevan M. Luković, Grol wrote many articles critical of King Alexander I in newspapers such as Dnevni list (Daily Paper) and Odjek (Echo). In April 1903, he was transferred to Negotin because of his opposition to Serbia's ruling Obrenović dynasty. He returned to Belgrade on 11 June 1903 (29 May 1903 on the Julian calendar used at the time), following the May Overthrow which led to the extinction of the Obrenović dynasty and the restoration of the Karađorđević dynasty to the Serbian throne. Politically, Grol identified with a group of left-wing urban democrats led by Ljubomir Živković, Ljubomir Stojanović and Jaša Prodanović. This movement separated from the People's Radical Party and later became the Independent Radical Party. After 1903, Grol continued to work with Skerlić, first as a journalist, and, from 1905 to 1909, as the editor of Dnevni list, which represented the left-wing ideals of the Independent Radical Party. Grol became a dramatist at the National Theatre and remained in that position until 1906. He taught for three more years before becoming the director of the National Theatre in 1909. From 1912 to 1914, he was the editor-in-chief of Odjek. Grol joined the main committee of the Independent Radical Party in 1913.

Grol remained director of the National Theatre until the outbreak of World War I in the summer of 1914. The war prompted him to relocate to Geneva, where he headed the Serbian Press Bureau from 1915 until 1918. After World War I, he and politician Ljubomir Davidović founded the Democratic Association, which later became the Democratic Party. Grol was again named director of the National Theatre in 1918 and held this position until 1924. In 1922, he and Kosta Jovanović founded the Nedeljni glasnik (Sunday Herald), which called for constitutional reform, the lessening of centralism, and more political agreement between Croatia and Serbia. Following the outbreak of a political crisis with the Democratic Party, Grol began editing Odjek again and split with Davidović following Svetozar Pribićević's departure from the party. Grol was twice elected to the parliament of the Kingdom of Serbs, Croats and Slovenes, in 1925 and 1927. He was a member of a Yugoslav coalition government consisting of Democrats, Radicals and the Slovene People's Party, and served as Minister of Education until 1929 when he reunited with Davidović and joined the opposition. In 1929, Grol joined the Ilija M. Kolarac Endowment Committee and organized the Kolarac People's University in Belgrade. He began publishing Odjek again in 1936. Following Davidović's death in 1940, Grol became president of the Democratic Party. He became the Kolarčev People's University's first director in 1941. He joined the government of Dušan Simović in March 1941 and went into exile following the Axis invasion of Yugoslavia that April. Christian Science Monitor Central European correspondent, Reuben Markham, described Grol as "one of the most unimpeachable democrats in the Balkans. His whole life is a record of working for the people,...bravely and incorruptibly. He lived in a small house on a modest street in...Belgrade....His meager income was free from all contamination."

Grol held various posts in the Yugoslav government-in-exile during World War II in London: Minister for Social Welfare and Public Health, from 27 March to January 1942; Minister of Transport, from 10 January 1942 to 26 June 1943; and Minister of Foreign Affairs, from 26 June to 10 August 1943.

In the first half of 1944, Serb politicians in the government-in-exile attempted to convince King Peter to appoint Grol to replace Božidar Purić as Prime Minister, but British pressure resulted in the appointment of a non-Serb, Ivan Šubašić, who would be willing to remove Draža Mihailović from his post as Minister of the Army, Navy and Air Force. The British had assessed that no Serb politician would be in a position to remove Mihailović. In February 1945, prior to the return of the government-in-exile to Yugoslavia, King Peter named Grol as a member of the regency to be formed under the Tito-Šubašić agreement, however Tito would not accept Grol in the regency, and he was ultimately not appointed. When the government-in-exile returned to Yugoslavia in March 1945 and merged with the interim Partisan government, Grol became vice premier without portfolio in the unified government under Prime Minister Tito. On 18 August 1945, Grol resigned his cabinet post because the communists failed to observe the conditions that had been agreed upon with the government-in-exile when the unified government was established.

Grol tried to re-publish the pre-war Democratic Party magazine called Demokratija, but was blocked by the Partisans. He was placed under house arrest in November 1945, and withdrew from public life after the introduction of communist rule. He testified at the trial of Draža Mihailović.

== Works ==
- Theatre Reviews (Pozorišne kritike), Belgrade, 1931.
- From Pre-War Serbia (Iz predratne Srbije), Belgrade, 1939.
- From the Theatre of Pre-War Serbia (Iz pozorišta predratne Srbije), Belgrade, 1952.

== Literature ==
- Enciklopedija Jugoslavije, part 4, 1986.

== Notes ==
Party political offices
Preceded by Ljubomir Davidović	Leader of the Democratic Party of Yugoslavia; 1940–1945	Succeeded by Party dissolved
Political offices
Preceded by	Yugoslav Minister of Education; 1928–1929	Succeeded by Božidar Purić
Preceded by Slobodan Jovanović	Yugoslav Minister of Foreign Affairs; 1943	Succeeded by Božidar Maksimović
