= Ministry of Foreign Affairs (Yugoslavia) =

Yugoslavian government ministry responsible for foreign affairs

- Serbo-Croatian: Ministarstvo inostranih poslova/Министарство иностраних послова Slovene: Ministrstvo za zunanje zadeve Macedonian: Министерството за надворешни работи
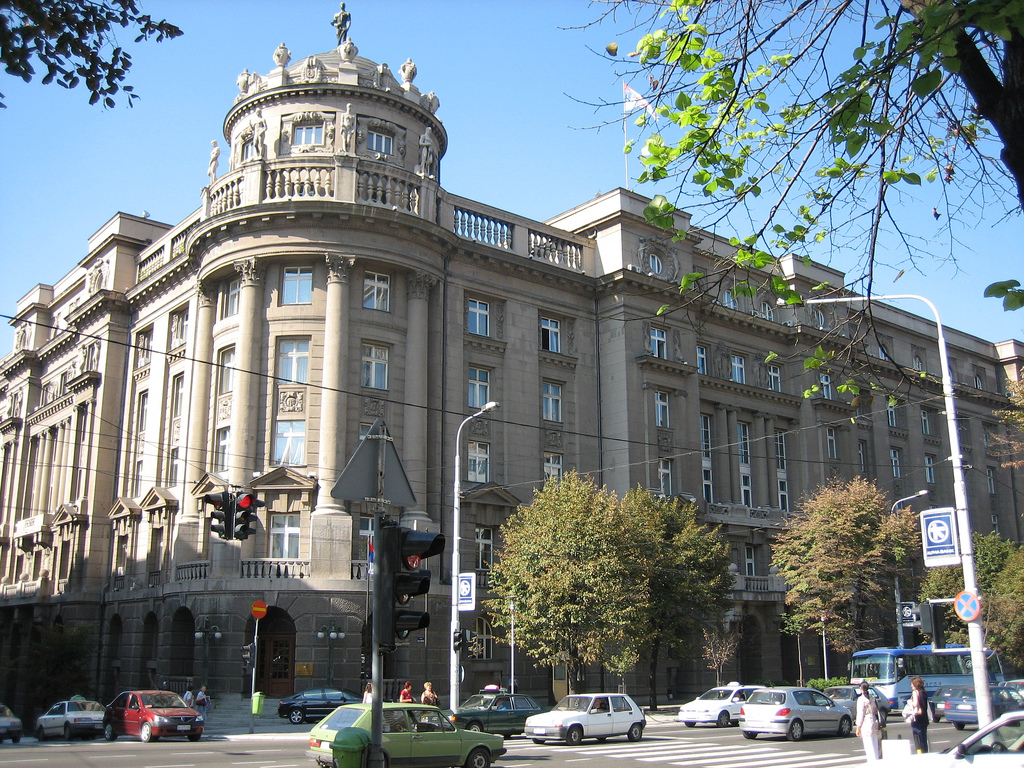
- The Ministry of Foreign Affairs Building

Ministry overview
- Formed: 7 December 1918; 107 years ago
- Dissolved: 28 April 1992; 34 years ago
- Jurisdiction: Yugoslavia
- Headquarters: Ministry of Foreign Affairs Building, 24–26 Kneza Miloša, Belgrade; 44.8032°N 20.4566°E
- Ministers responsible: Ante Trumbić, first Minister of Foreign Affairs; Budimir Lončar, last Minister of Foreign Affairs
- Parent department: Federal Executive Council (1953–1992)

The Ministry of Foreign Affairs was the ministry responsible for representing the Kingdom of Yugoslavia internationally from 1918 to 1941 and the Socialist Federal Republic of Yugoslavia from 1945 to 1992.

== List of ministers ==
=== Kingdom of Yugoslavia (1918–1941) ===
No.	Portrait	Minister	Took office	Left office	Time in office	Party
1	Ante Trumbić	Ante Trumbić (1864–1938)	7 December 1918	22 November 1920	1 year, 351 days	Independent
2	Milenko Vesnić	Milenko Vesnić (1863–1921)	22 November 1920	1 January 1921	40 days	NRS
3	Nikola Pašić	Nikola Pašić (1845–1926)	1 January 1921	5 January 1922	1 year, 4 days	NRS
4	Momčilo Ninčić	Momčilo Ninčić (1876–1949)	5 January 1922	27 July 1924	2 years, 204 days	NRS
5	Vojislav Marinković	Vojislav Marinković (1876–1935)	27 July 1924	6 November 1924	102 days	DS
(4)	Momčilo Ninčić	Momčilo Ninčić (1876–1949)	6 November 1924	6 December 1926	2 years, 30 days	NRS
–	Miloš Trifunović	Miloš Trifunović (1871–1957); Acting	6 December 1926	24 December 1926	18 days	NRS
6	Ninko Perić	Ninko Perić (1886–1961)	24 December 1926	12 April 1927	109 days	NRS
(5)	Vojislav Marinković	Vojislav Marinković (1876–1935)	17 April 1927	3 July 1932	5 years, 77 days	DS; JNS
7	Bogoljub Jevtić	Bogoljub Jevtić (1886–1960)	3 July 1932	24 June 1935	2 years, 356 days	JNS; JRZ
8	Milan Stojadinović	Milan Stojadinović (1888–1961)	24 June 1935	5 February 1939	3 years, 226 days	JRZ
9	Aleksandar Cincar-Marković	Aleksandar Cincar-Marković (1889–1947)	5 February 1939	27 March 1941	2 years, 50 days	JRZ
(4)	Momčilo Ninčić	Momčilo Ninčić (1876–1949)	27 March 1941	18 April 1941	22 days	Independent

=== Yugoslav government-in-exile (1941–1945) ===
No.	Portrait	Minister	Took office	Left office	Time in office	Party
1	Momčilo Ninčić	Momčilo Ninčić (1876–1949)	18 April 1941	1 January 1943	1 year, 258 days	Independent
–	Slobodan Jovanović	Slobodan Jovanović (1869–1958); Acting	2 January 1943	26 June 1943	175 days	Independent
2	Milan Grol	Milan Grol (1876–1952)	26 June 1943	10 August 1943	45 days	DS
3	Božidar Purić	Božidar Purić (1891–1977)	10 August 1943	1 June 1944	296 days	Independent
4	Ivan Šubašić	Ivan Šubašić (1892–1955)	1 June 1944	17 October 1945	1 year, 138 days	HSS

=== National Committee for the Liberation of Yugoslavia (1943–1945) ===
No.	Portrait	Commissioner for Foreign Affairs	Took office	Left office	Time in office	Party
1	Josip Smodlaka	Josip Smodlaka (1869–1956)	29 November 1943	7 March 1945	1 year, 98 days	JNOF

=== SFR Yugoslavia (1945–1992) ===
After the Communist Party of Yugoslavia took control of the country in 1945, most of the prewar ministers were removed from politics. Momčilo Ninčić, Bogoljub Jevtić, Milan Stojadinović, Slobodan Jovanović and Božidar Purić remained in exile. Miloš Trifunović, Milan Grol and Ivan Šubašić left politics.

No.	Portrait	Minister	Took office	Left office	Time in office	Party
–	Josip Broz Tito	Josip Broz Tito (1892–1980); Acting	30 November 1945	31 January 1946	62 days	SKJ
1	Stanoje Simić	Stanoje Simić (1893–1970)	1 February 1946	31 August 1948	2 years, 212 days	SKJ
2	Edvard Kardelj	Edvard Kardelj (1910–1979)	31 August 1948	14 January 1953	4 years, 136 days	SKJ
3	Koča Popović	Koča Popović (1908–1992)	15 January 1953	23 April 1965	12 years, 98 days	SKJ
4	Marko Nikezić	Marko Nikezić (1921–1991)	23 April 1965	25 December 1968	3 years, 246 days	SKJ
–	Mišo Pavićević [sr]	Mišo Pavićević (1915–1995); Acting	25 December 1968	25 April 1969	121 days	SKJ
5	Mirko Tepavac	Mirko Tepavac (1922–2014)	25 April 1969	1 November 1972	3 years, 190 days	SKJ
–	Jakša Petrić [sr]	Jakša Petrić (1922–1993); Acting	1 November 1972	15 December 1972	44 days	SKJ
6	Miloš Minić	Miloš Minić (1914–2003)	16 December 1972	17 May 1978	5 years, 152 days	SKJ
7	Josip Vrhovec	Josip Vrhovec (1926–2006)	17 May 1978	17 May 1982	4 years	SKJ
8	Lazar Mojsov	Lazar Mojsov (1920–2011)	17 May 1982	15 May 1984	1 year, 364 days	SKJ
9	Raif Dizdarević	Raif Dizdarević (1926–2026)	15 May 1984	30 December 1987	3 years, 229 days	SKJ
10	Budimir Lončar	Budimir Lončar (1924–2024)	31 December 1987	11 December 1991	3 years, 345 days	SKJ
–	Milivoje Maksić	Milivoje Maksić (1928–2003); Acting	11 December 1991	28 April 1992	139 days	SPS

== See also ==
- Ministry of Foreign Affairs (Serbia and Montenegro)
- Ministry of Foreign Affairs (Bosnia and Herzegovina)
- Ministry of Foreign and European Affairs (Croatia)
- Ministry of Foreign Affairs (Kosovo)
- Ministry of Foreign Affairs (Montenegro)
- Ministry of Foreign Affairs (North Macedonia)
- Ministry of Foreign Affairs (Serbia)
- Ministry of Foreign and European Affairs (Slovenia)

== Sources ==
- Žarković, Petar; Bešlin, Milivoj (2024). "Brijunski plenum kao idejni i koncepcijski sukob: spor oko Državnoga sekretarijata za vanjske poslove" [The Brijuni Plenum as an Ideological and Conceptual Conflict: The Dispute over the State Secretariat for Foreign Affairs]. Časopis za suvremenu povijest - Journal of Contemporary History (in Croatian). 56 (2). Croatian Institute of History: 49–76. doi:10.22586/csp.v56i2.28044.
