= Miloš Trifunović =

Miloš Trifunović may refer to:

- Miloš Trifunović (politician) (1871–1951), Serbian and Yugoslav politician
- Miloš Trifunović (footballer) (born 1984), Serbian footballer
