= Yugoslav government-in-exile =

World War II government-in-exile of Yugoslavia

Government of the Kingdom of Yugoslavia in Exile
- 1941–1945
- Flag Greater coat of arms
- Anthem: Himna Kraljevine Jugoslavije
- Status: Government-in-exile
- Capital: Belgrade
- Capital-in-exile: London
- Common languages: Serbo-Croato-Slovene
- King
  - 1941–1945: Peter II
- Prime Minister
  - 1941–1942 (first): Dušan Simović
  - 1944–1945 (last): Ivan Šubašić
- History
  - Established: 27 April 1941
  - Disestablished: 7 March 1945
Preceded by	Succeeded by
Kingdom of Yugoslavia	Democratic Federal Yugoslavia

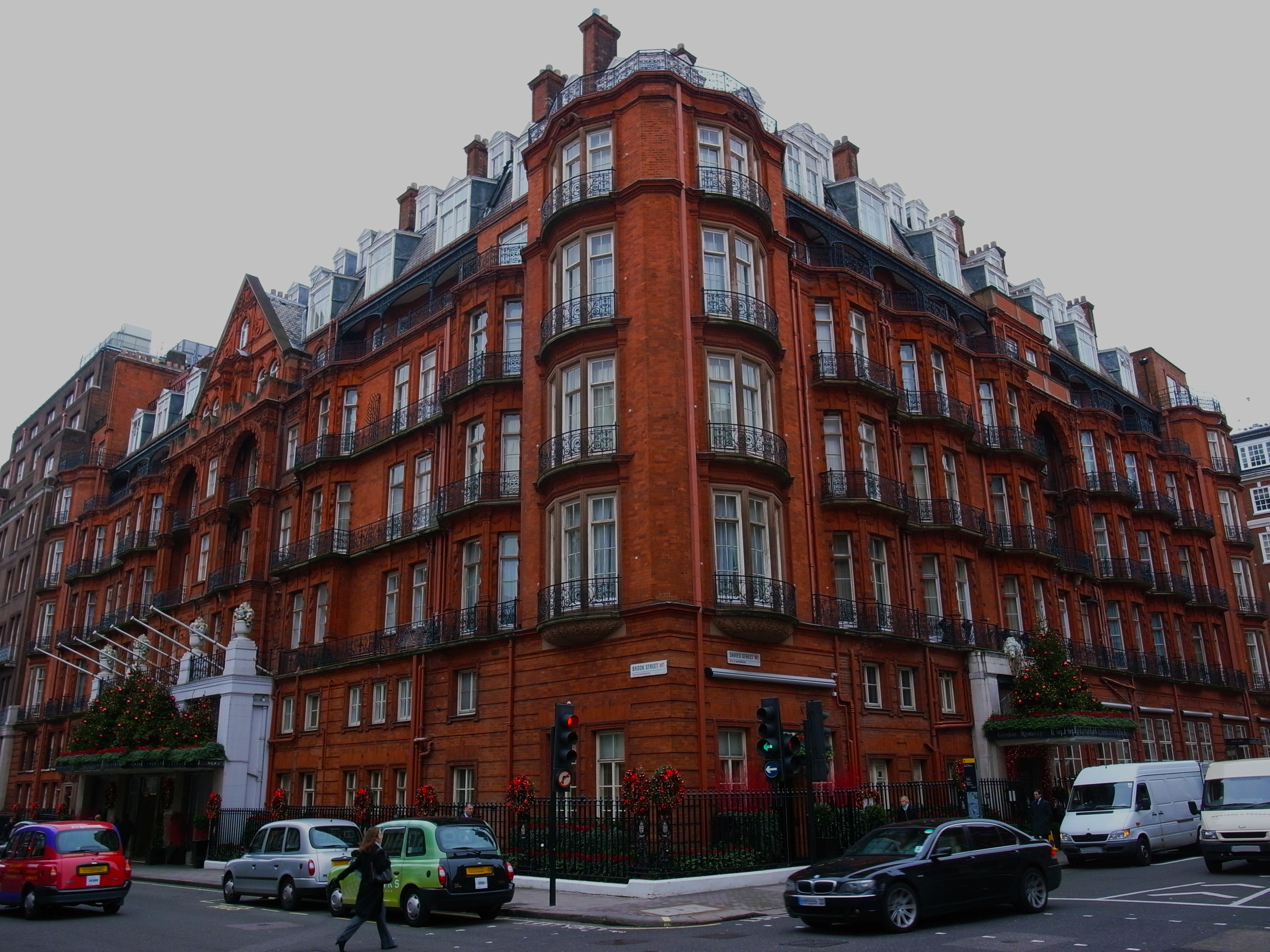
Claridge's Hotel in London, where the Yugoslav government-in-exile was based during the war.

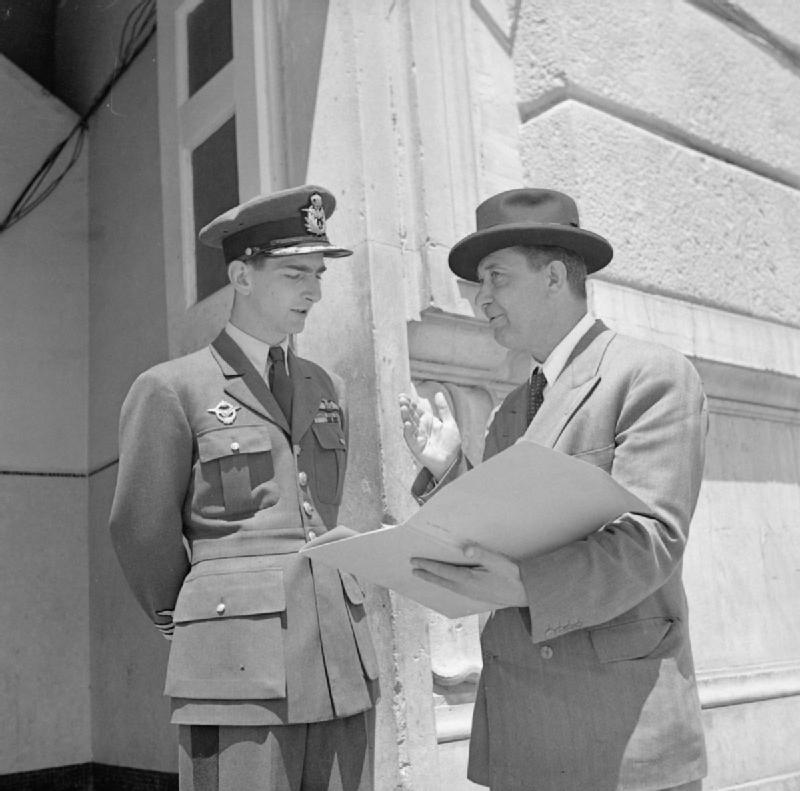
King Peter II conferring with the Prime Minister of the Yugoslav Government in Exile, Ivan Šubašić.

The Government of the Kingdom of Yugoslavia in Exile (Serbo-Croatian: Vlada Kraljevine Jugoslavije u egzilu, Влада Краљевине Југославије у егзилу) was an official government-in-exile of Yugoslavia, headed by King Peter II. It evacuated from Belgrade in April 1941, after the Axis invasion of the country, and went first to Greece, then to Palestine, then to Egypt, and finally, in June 1941, to the United Kingdom. Hence, it is also referred to as the "Government in London" (Vlada u Londonu, Влада у Лондону). It was dissolved in March 1945.

== Background ==
According to economics professor and historian Jozo Tomasevich, the Kingdom of Yugoslavia was politically weak from the moment of its creation in December 1918, and remained so during the interwar period mainly due to rigid centralism combined with strong ethno-religious identities. In particular, the religious primacy of the Serbian Orthodox Church in national affairs and discrimination against Roman Catholics and Muslims compounded the dissatisfaction of the non-Serb population. The kingdom's internal politics became ethnically polarised, a phenomenon that has been referred to as the "national question" in Yugoslavia.

Until 1929, this state of affairs was maintained by subverting the democratic system of government. In 1929, democracy was abandoned and a royal dictatorship was established by King Alexander. The king attempted to weaken the ethnic divisions in the country by creating administrative divisions (Serbo-Croatian Latin: banovine) based on rivers rather than traditional regions. By 1933, however, discontent in the largely Croat-populated Sava Banovina had developed into full-blown civil disorder, which the regime countered with a series of assassinations and arrests of key Croatian opposition figures. When Alexander was assassinated in Marseille in 1934 by the Croatian nationalists, his cousin Prince Paul took over the regency, ruling on behalf of Alexander's 11-year-old son, Peter II. In the aftermath of Alexander's assassination, Yugoslavia was isolated both militarily and diplomatically.

Prince Paul repeatedly attempted to negotiate a political settlement with Vladko Maček, the Croatian Peasant Party (HSS) leader. In January 1937, Prime Minister Milan Stojadinović met with Maček at Prince Paul's request, but Stojadinović was unable to contain Croat dissatisfaction with a Yugoslavia dominated by the Serbs. In 1938, the German annexation of Austria gave Yugoslavia a common border with Nazi-ruled Germany. That year, the commander of the Royal Yugoslav Air Force, Lieutenant General Dušan Simović, was involved in three coup plots—two early in the year driven by Serb opposition to the concordat with the Vatican and a later one sparked by dissatisfaction with results of the December elections.

On the evening of 3 February 1939, five ministers resigned from the government in response to a Serb nationalist speech made by the Minister of Education, Bogoljub Kujundžić. The five were: the Slovene senate leader, Anton Korošec; the leader of the Yugoslav Muslim Organization (JMO), Mehmed Spaho; another JMO politician, Džafer Kulenović; the Slovene Franc Snoj; and the Serb Dragiša Cvetković. Prince Paul then dismissed Stojadinović and appointed Cvetković in his place, with a direction that he reach an agreement with the Croat leader Maček. While these negotiations were ongoing, Italy invaded Albania. In August 1939, the Cvetković–Maček Agreement was concluded to create the Banovina of Croatia, which was to be a relatively autonomous political unit within Yugoslavia. Separatist Croats considered the Agreement did not go far enough, while many Serbs believed it went too far. The Cvetković-led cabinet formed in the wake of the agreement was resolutely anti-Axis, and included five members of the HSS, with Maček as deputy Prime Minister.

== Lead-up to invasion ==
By the time of the German invasion of Poland and subsequent outbreak of World War II in September 1939, the Yugoslav Intelligence Service was cooperating with British intelligence agencies on a large scale across the country. This cooperation, which had existed to a lesser extent during the early 1930s, intensified after the Anschluss in 1938. These combined intelligence operations were aimed at strengthening Yugoslavia and keeping her neutral while encouraging covert activities. From the outbreak of war British diplomacy focused on keeping Yugoslavia neutral, which the Ambassador Ronald Campbell apparently still believed possible. In mid-1940, German pressure on the government resulted in the resignation of the Minister of the Interior, Dr. Stanoje Mihaldžić, who had been organising covert anti-Axis activities. In mid to late 1940, British intelligence became aware of coup plotting, but managed to side-track the plans, preferring to continue working through Prince Paul. The Special Operations Executive (SOE) office in Belgrade went to significant lengths to support the opposition to the anti-Axis Cvetković government, which undermined the hard-won balance in Yugoslav politics that government represented. SOE Belgrade was entangled with pro-Serb policies and interests, and disregarded or underestimated warnings from SOE Zagreb and British diplomats in that city, who better understood the situation in Yugoslavia as a whole. In October 1940, Simović was again approached by plotters planning a coup but he was non-committal.

Yugoslavia's situation worsened in October 1940 when Italy invaded Greece from Albania, and the initial failure of the Italians to make headway only increased Yugoslav apprehension that Germany would be forced to attack Greece in order to help Italy. In September and November 1940 respectively, Germany forced Hungary and Romania to accede to the Tripartite Pact. In early November 1940, Nedić, who believed that Germany would win the war, proposed to the government that it abandon its neutral stance and join the Axis as soon as possible in the hope that Germany would protect Yugoslavia against its "greedy neighbors". A few days later Prince Paul, having realised the impossibility of following Nedić's advice, replaced him. Germany's planned invasion of Greece would be simplified if Yugoslavia could be neutralised. Over the next few months, Prince Paul and his ministers laboured under overwhelming German diplomatic pressure, the threat of an attack by the Germans from Bulgarian territory, and the unwillingness of the British to promise practical military support. By late 1940, British policy towards the government of Yugoslavia had shifted from acceptance of Yugoslav neutrality to pressuring the country for support in the war against Germany.

In January 1941, the US placed additional pressure on Prince Paul, urging non-cooperation with Germany. On 14 February, Adolf Hitler met with Cvetković and Yugoslav foreign minister Aleksandar Cincar-Marković, and requested Yugoslavia's accession to the Tripartite Pact. He also pushed for the demobilisation of the Royal Yugoslav Army, and the granting of permission to transport German supplies through Yugoslavia's territory, along with greater economic cooperation. In exchange he offered a port near the Aegean Sea and territorial security. On 1 March, Yugoslavia was further isolated when Bulgaria signed the Pact and the German army arrived at the Bulgarian-Yugoslav border.

On 4 March, Prince Paul secretly met with Hitler in Berchtesgaden and was again pressured to sign the Pact. Hitler did not request troop passage through Yugoslavia and offered the Greek city of Salonika. A time limit for Prince Paul, who was uncommitted and "wavering", wasn't set. Prince Paul, in the middle of a cabinet crisis, offered a nonaggression pact and a declaration of friendship, but Hitler insisted on accession to the Pact. Prince Paul warned that "I fear that if I follow your advice and sign the Tripartite Pact I shall no longer be here in six months."

=== Yugoslavia signs the Pact ===
On 17 March, Prince Paul returned to Berchtesgaden and was told by Hitler that it was his last chance for Yugoslavia to join the Pact, renouncing this time the request for the use of Yugoslav railways in order to facilitate their accession. On 19 March, Prince Paul convened a Crown Council to discuss the terms of the Pact and whether Yugoslavia should sign it. The Council's members were willing to agree, but only under the condition that Germany let its concessions be made public. Germany agreed and the Council approved the terms. Three cabinet ministers resigned on 20 March in protest of the impending signing of the Pact. The Germans reacted by imposing an ultimatum to accept by midnight 23 March or forfeit any further chances. Prince Paul and Cvetković obliged and accepted, despite believing German promises were "worthless". On 23 March, Germany's guarantee of Yugoslavia's territorial security and its promise not to use its railroads were publicised. In the United Kingdom, Alexander Cadogan, the Permanent Under-Secretary of State for Foreign Affairs, penned in his diary that the "Yugoslavs seem to have sold their souls to the Devil. All these Balkan peoples are trash."

On 25 March, the pact was signed at the Belvedere palace in Vienna. German radio later announced that "the Axis Powers would not demand the right of passage of troops or war materials," while the official document mentioned only troops and omitted mention of war materials. Likewise the pledge to give Salonika to Yugoslavia does not appear on the document. On the following day, Serb demonstrators gathered on the streets of Belgrade shouting "Better the grave than a slave, better a war than the pact" (Serbo-Croatian Latin: Bolje grob nego rob, Bolje rat nego pakt).

=== Coup d'état ===
A coup d'état occurred on 27 March 1941 in Belgrade. The coup was planned and conducted by a group of pro-Western Serb-nationalist Royal Yugoslav Air Force and Royal Guard officers formally led by Simović. For practical purposes several others performed leadership roles in the conduct of the coup. Some other civilian leaders were probably aware of the coup before it was launched and moved to support it once it occurred, but they were not among the organisers. The Communist Party of Yugoslavia played no part in the coup, although it made a significant contribution to the mass street protests in many cities that signalled popular support for the coup after it occurred. The coup was successful and overthrew the three-member regency as well as the government of Cvetković. The coup had been planned for several months, but the signing of the Tripartite Pact spurred the organisers to carry it out, encouraged by the SOE. The military conspirators brought to power 17-year-old Peter Karađorđević (regnal name Peter II) to reign as the new king, whom they declared to be of age, and a government of national unity was formed with Simović as prime minister and Maček and Slobodan Jovanović as his vice-premiers.

=== Post-coup government ===
In the wake of the coup, Simović's new government refused to ratify Yugoslavia's signing of the Tripartite Pact, but did not openly rule it out. Hitler, angered by the coup and anti-German incidents in Belgrade, gathered his senior officers and ordered that Yugoslavia be crushed without delay. On the same day as the coup he issued Führer Directive 25 which called for Yugoslavia to be treated as a hostile state. Italy was to be included in the operations and the directive made specific mention that "[e]fforts will be made to induce Hungary and Bulgaria to take part in operations by offering them the prospect of regaining Bačka and Macedonia". Furthermore, the directive stated that "[i]nternal tensions in Yugoslavia will be encouraged by giving political assurances to the Croats".

On 30 March, Foreign Minister Momčilo Ninčić summoned the German ambassador Viktor von Heeren and handed him a statement which declared that the new government would accept all its international obligations, including accession to the Tripartite Pact, as long as the national interests of the country were protected. Von Heeren returned to his office to discover a message from Berlin instructing that contact with Yugoslav officials was to be avoided, and he was recalled to Berlin. No reply was given to Ninčić. On 2 April orders were issued for the evacuation of the German embassy, and the German chargé d'affaires advised the diplomats of friendly countries to leave the country. On 3 April, Führer Directive 26 was issued, detailing the plan of attack and command structure for the invasion. Hungary and Bulgaria were promised the Bačka and Yugoslav Macedonia respectively and the Romanian army was asked not to take part, holding its position at the countries' border. Internal conflict in Hungary over the invasion plans between the army and Teleki led to the Prime Minister's suicide that same evening. Also on 3 April, Edmund Veesenmayer, representing the Dienststelle Ribbentrop, arrived in Zagreb in preparation for a regime change.

Simović named Maček as Deputy Prime Minister once again in the new government, but Maček was reluctant and remained in Zagreb while he decided what to do. While he considered the coup had been an entirely Serbian initiative aimed at both Prince Paul and the Cvetković–Maček Agreement, he decided that he needed to show HSS support for the new government and that joining it was necessary. On 4 April he travelled to Belgrade and accepted the post, on several conditions; that the new government respect the Cvetković–Maček Agreement and expand the autonomy of the Banovina Croatia in some respects, that the new government respect the country's accession to the Tripartite Pact, and that one Serb and one Croat temporarily assume the role of regents. That same day exiled Croatian politician and Ustaše leader Ante Pavelić called for Croats to start an uprising against the government over his Radio Velebit program based in Italy.

On 5 April the new cabinet met for the first time. While the first two conditions set by Maček were met, the appointment of regents was impracticable given Prince Peter had been declared to be of age. Involving representatives from across the political spectrum, Simović's cabinet was "extremely disunited and weak". It included members who fell into three groups; those who were strongly opposed to the Axis and prepared to face war with Germany, those who advocated peace with Germany, and those that were uncommitted.

== Invasion and flight ==
The Axis invasion of Yugoslavia began on 6 April. The bombing of Belgrade forced the government to seek shelter outside the city. From there, King Peter and Simović planned to leave for exile. Maček, refusing to leave the country, resigned on 7 April and designated Juraj Krnjević as his successor. Maček returned to Zagreb. Three other ministers also refused to leave Yugoslavia: Ivan Andres and Bariša Smoljan of the HSS and Kulenović of the JMO. The government met on Yugoslav soil for the last time on 13 April near Pale. From there they travelled to Nikšić where they were flown out of the country to Athens.

== Simović cabinet ==
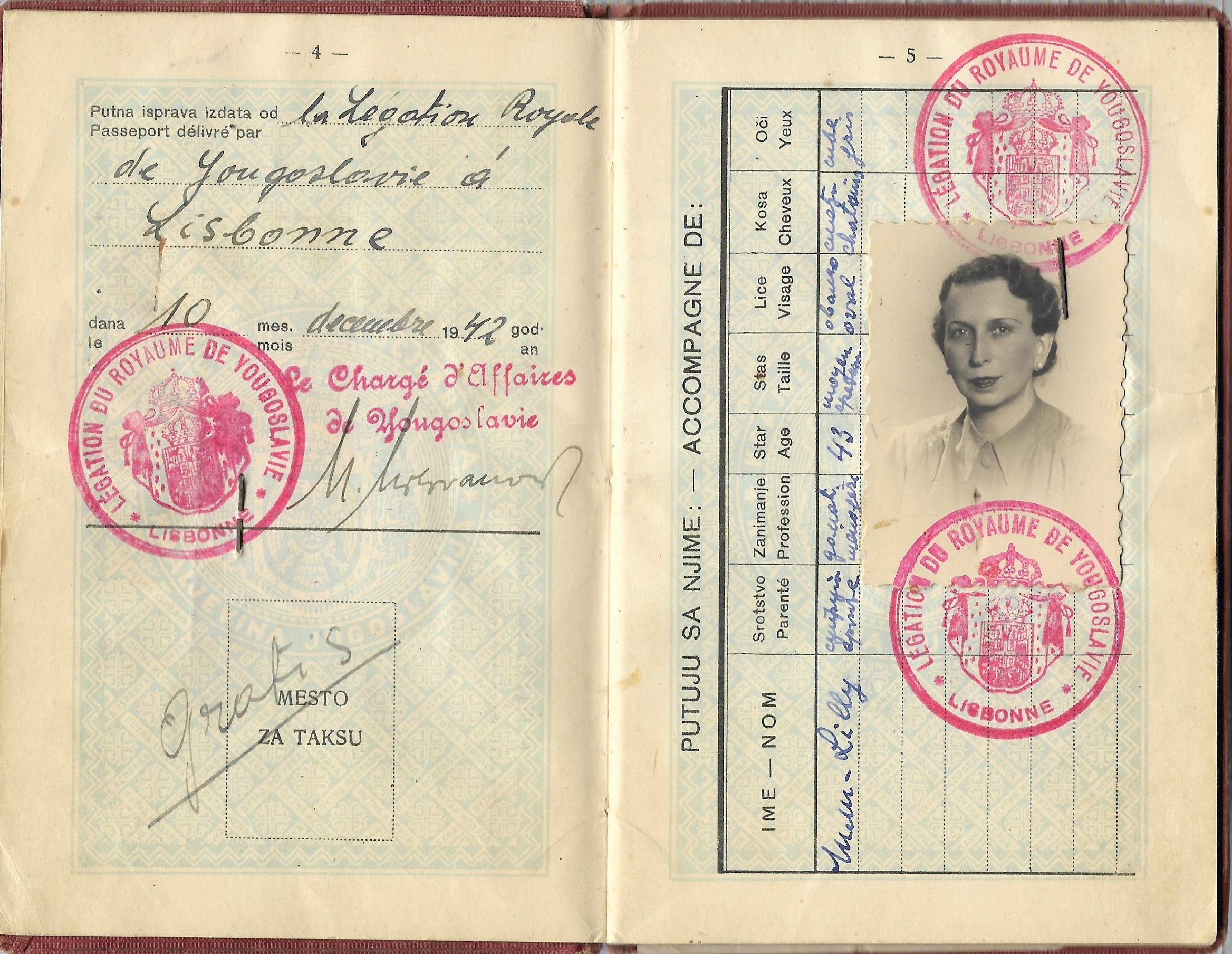
1942 issued government in exile passport by Chargé d'affaires in Portugal Milutin Milovanovic.

King Peter, all the main leaders of the coup d'état, most of Simović's cabinet and a number of government officials flew out of Yugoslavia to Greece on 14–15 April. After a brief stop in Athens, they travelled on to Jerusalem where they were temporarily accommodated. On 21 June, the king and most of the cabinet arrived in London. Several members of the cabinet that left Yugoslavia did not travel to London, and ended up in the United States or Canada. Some politicians and government officials travelled to Cape Town, South Africa, where they constituted a reserve government of sorts. Bogoljub Ilić, who remained Minister of the Army and Navy and also became Chief of the General Staff in place of Simović, established a new Yugoslav Supreme Command in Cairo. The remnants of the Royal Yugoslav Army and Navy that had escaped the country were concentrated in Palestine and Egypt under his command. The government also appointed a special representative in the Middle East, Jovan Đonović, who was responsible for propaganda and communication with contacts in occupied Yugoslavia.

Although the coup d'état had generated a significant amount of goodwill towards the post-coup government in the West, that spirit had evaporated with the ignominious defeat of the government and armed forces during the invasion. Much of the early effort of the Serb members of the cabinet was focussed on fixing the blame for the defeat on the Ustaše or even on Croats more generally. The Kingdom of Yugoslavia was soon divided by the Axis into several entities. Germany, Italy, Hungary, and Bulgaria annexed some border areas outright. A Greater Germany was expanded to include most of Drava Banovina. Italy added the Governorship of Dalmatia and more than a third of western Drava Banovina to the Italian Empire. An expanded Croatia was recognized by the Axis as the Independent State of Croatia (Nezavisna Država Hrvatska, NDH). On paper, the NDH was a kingdom, and the 4th Duke of Aosta was crowned as King Tomislav II of Croatia. The rump Serbian territory became a military administration of Germany run by military governors, with a Serb civil government led by Milan Nedić. Nedić attempted to gain German recognition of Serbia as a successor state to Yugoslavia and claimed King Peter II as Serbia's monarch. Puppet states were also set up in Montenegro and southern Yugoslavia. Hungary occupied and annexed several northern regions.

King Peter II, who had escaped into exile, was still recognized as king of the whole state of Yugoslavia by the Allies. Starting on 13 May 1941, the largely Serbian "Yugoslav Army of the Fatherland" (Jugoslovenska vojska u otadžbini, or JVUO, or Četniks) resisted the Axis occupation of Yugoslavia (the Chetniks later collaborated with the Axis). This anti-German and anti-communist resistance movement was commanded by Royalist General Draža Mihailović. For a long time, the Četniks were supported by the British, the United States, and the Yugoslavian royal government in exile of King Peter II.

However, over the course of the war, effective power changed to the hands of Josip Broz Tito's Communist Partisans. In 1943, Tito proclaimed the creation of the Democratic Federative Yugoslavia (Demokratska federativna Jugoslavija). The Allies gradually recognized Tito's forces as the stronger opposition to the German occupation. They began to send most of their aid to Tito's Partisans, rather than to the Royalist Četniks. On 16 June 1944, the Tito–Šubašić agreement was signed, merging the de facto and the de jure governments of Yugoslavia.

During his exile, King Peter II was educated at Cambridge University, served in the Royal Air Force and married Princess Alexandra of Greece and Denmark, who was the only child of the late King Alexander I of Greece and Princess Aspasia of Greece and Denmark.

== Jovanović cabinet ==
Jovanović took office as prime minister on 11 January 1942 with the dismissal of Simović. His original appointment as vice-premier in the Simović government had been in recognition of the respect he engendered, and because he was seen as a Serb counterpart to Maček as an overall leader of the Serbs across the country. He was a positivist, non-romantic liberal who was opposed to both fascism and communism, but was not directly connected to any political party. Simović was dropped from the cabinet, as was Ilić, who had been Minister of the Army. The latter was replaced by Mihailović, but because he was in Yugoslavia, the government in London was now in the hands of civilians.

== Šubašić cabinet ==
Ivan Šubašić took office on 1 June 1944. He was appointed to negotiate with Tito because of his special position in the Croatian Peasant Party, his loyalty to the Karađorđević dynasty, his moderation in comparison with other Croatian politicians, and his experience in difficult situations. Nevertheless, his nomination after months of British pressure on the king depended on the elimination of Mihailovich from the cabinet.

Ten days after his nomination, Šubašić fled to the island of Vis in the Adriatic Sea in order to meet with Tito and try to form a coalition government. Tito agreed to postpone a decision on the form of government until the end of the war, and Šubašić, for his part, recognised that only the partisan administration of the Yugoslav territory would receive support. He also promised that the government would include only people who had not previously opposed Tito and his organisation, and that it would concentrate on securing international support. The agreement was signed on 16 June with no consultation by Šubašić or with the king.

After his return, Šubašić formed a government of five ministers, with two of them proposed by Tito. Mihailovich lost his position as war minister. He refused to recognise the new government and continued to proclaim his loyalty to the king.

On 12 September, the king went on the radio to ask people to support Tito.

Šubašić met with Tito in Belgrade on 1 November. Under their agreement, the King was not authorised to return to the country until a plebiscite was held about the monarchy. After Šubašić returned to London, the king rejected the agreement and replaced Šubašić on 23 January 1945. But under British pressure, the king was compelled to call him back six days later and to accept the principle of a regency.

Two weeks later, Šubašić and his ministers went to Belgrade. A new coalition government was formed on 7 March, in which Tito controlled 20 ministers of 28. This ended the government in exile.

== Armed forces ==
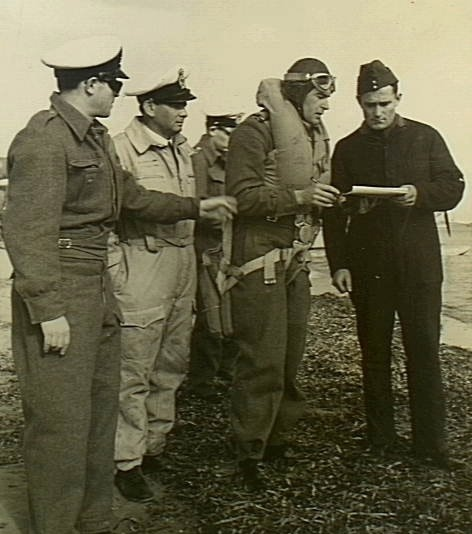
A pilot of the No. 2 Yugoslav Floatplane Squadron in Aboukir signs a maintenance chit before takeoff, 1942

In exile, the Royal Yugoslav Forces were initially under the command of General Bogoljub Ilić as minister of the Army, Navy and Air Force and chief of the General Staff, and General Borivoje Mirković as commander of the Air Force. There were initially about 1,000 men in these forces in Cairo. On 12 January 1942, the king dismissed the prime minister, Ilić and Mirković, provoking a mutiny by officers supportive of the Air Force general. The king then appointed Colonel Dragoljub Mihailović, leader of the Četniks in Yugoslavia, as minister and chief of staff to replace Ilić in absentia; he then appointed General Petar Živković to act as Mihailović's deputy in London and Cairo. Mihailović was dismissed in August 1944 as Allied support shifted away from the Četniks. On 7 March 1945, the king dissolved the government and disbanded the armed forces, proclaiming Tito's Partisans on the ground to be the sole legitimate government and military.

The first unit of the Royal Yugoslav Army to be formed in exile was the 1st Battalion, Royal Yugoslav Guards, under Major Živan Knežević. It comprised a headquarters and four rifle companies (A, B, C and D). Of its original complement of 505 men, 411 were Slovenes who had been conscripted into the Royal Italian Army and subsequently captured by the British. In January 1942, command of this unit passed to Lieutenant Colonel Miloje Dinić, and on 19 February to Lt. Col. Milan Prosen, after Dinić was implicated in the pro-Mirković mutiny. (He and 57 other Guards were interned by the British at the Torah camp in March, along with all 346 of the Yugoslav Air Force's ground personnel.) In late February, the unit was ordered to relieve the Czechoslovak contingent at the siege of Tobruk, but was diverted to join the 11th Brigade, 4th (Indian) Division in Libya. In April, it retreated to Halfaya Pass and then to Mersa Matruh. In July, it was reassigned to the 9th (British) Army in Mandatory Palestine to guard the oil refinery at Haifa. In January 1943, when Lt. Col. Franc Stropnik assumed command, the battalion was 850 strong and well-trained. It was attached to the 25th Brigade, 10th (Indian) Division. Before the end of the year, monarchist and communist (pro-Tito) factions had appeared in the ranks; numbers dwindled. Barely the size of a company, a rump unit was sent to the Italian theatre with its brigade in March 1944. It was disbanded soon after, despite the recruitment of 2,000 captured Slovene conscripts assembled in Algiers by Prosen. The British refused to ferry these men to Cairo, so they were assigned labour duties.

After the fall of Yugoslavia, 105 personnel of the Royal Yugoslav Navy, under Commander Z. V. Adamić, joined the Mediterranean Fleet at Alexandria in Egypt. Two motor torpedo boats (MTBs), Durmitor and Kajmakčalan, and a submarine, Nebojša, ran the gauntlet of the Adriatic, evading the Italian Navy, and arrived in Suda Bay on 22–23 April before proceeding to Alexandria. The MTBs participated in the Syria and Lebanon campaign, while Nebojša undertook training exercises. Ten floatplanes of the Naval Air Force also escaped. On 3 June 1941, eight Dornier Do 22kj and two Rogožarski SIM-XIV-H formed the 2 (Yugoslav) Squadron of the No. 230 Squadron RAF, based in Aboukir. They participated in the Battle of Crete and patrolled the African coast until the unit was disbanded on 23 April 1942. In late 1943, Commander J. Saksida was given command of a torpedo boat flotilla based at Malta, which included some former Yugoslav MTBs that had been captured by Italy in 1941 and then surrendered to the Allies after Italy's armistice, as well as three minelayers: Melinje, Miljet and Villa. The Yugoslav Navy was also operating eight former American PT boats and, after 11 January 1944, the ex-HMS Mallow (renamed Nada), out of Livorno in Italy. In March 1945, all Royal Yugoslav vessels assembled at Ancona in preparation for the handover to Tito's forces, which occurred in August. The negotiations for the transfer of the vessels under British command took place on Vis. The royal representative was Captain Ivan Kern, whom Tito later promoted to rear admiral.

The eleven aircraft of the Royal Yugoslav Air Force to make it to Alexandria were requisitioned by the British. Several Savoia-Marchetti SM.79s piloted by Yugoslavs joined No. 117 Squadron RAF and flew transport missions along the Takoradi air route. On 2 July 1942, the interned Yugoslav Air Force personnel and Guards in Alexandria were formed into the 244 Temporary Battalion of the King's Own Royal Regiment, but after a pro-Tito mutiny in November 1943, the unit was disbanded. Its personnel were transferred to the diminished Royal Guards, while 224 of the Air Force men joined the Balkan Air Force in Libya. Joined by Partisan volunteers, these men formed No. 352 Squadron RAF on 22 April 1944 and No. 352 Squadron on 1 July. They mainly flew Hawker Hurricanes and Supermarine Spitfires in operations over Yugoslavia in support of the Partisans. Both squadrons were disbanded on 15 June 1945.

== Prime Ministers ==
Portrait	Name (Born-Died)	Term of office		Party
Portrait	Name (Born-Died)	Start	End	Party
1	Dušan Simović (1882–1962)	27 April 1941	12 January 1942	Independent (Royal Yugoslav Army)
2	Slobodan Jovanović (1869–1958)	12 January 1942	18 June 1943	Independent
3	Miloš Trifunović (1871–1957)	18 June 1943	10 August 1943	People's Radical Party (NRS)
4	Božidar Purić (1891–1977)	10 August 1943	8 July 1944	Independent
5	Ivan Šubašić (1892–1955)	8 July 1944	7 March 1945	Croatian Peasant Party (HSS)
