= Ljubomir Davidović =

Yugoslav and Serbian politician

- Љубомир Давидовић
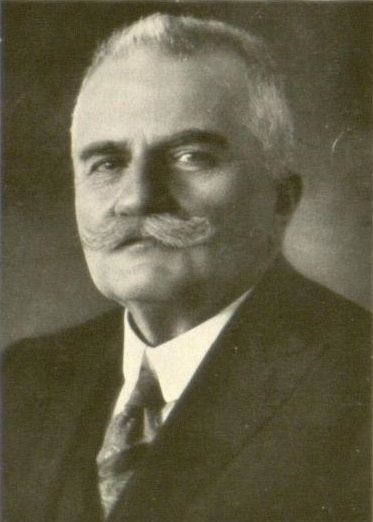

2nd Prime Minister of Yugoslavia
- In office 28 July 1924 – 6 November 1924
- Monarch: Peter I
- Preceded by: Nikola Pašić
- Succeeded by: Nikola Pašić
- In office 16 August 1919 – 19 February 1920
- Monarch: Peter I
- Preceded by: Stojan Protić
- Succeeded by: Stojan Protić

Personal details
- Born: 24 December 1863 Vlaško Polje, Serbia
- Died: 19 February 1940 (aged 76) Belgrade, Yugoslavia
- Party: Democratic Party

Ljubomir Davidović (24 December 1863 – 19 February 1940) was a Yugoslav and Serbian politician who served as prime minister (1919–1920 and 1924) of the Kingdom of Serbs, Croats, and Slovenes (later called Yugoslavia).

== Biography ==
Davidović was born in a village in the Kosmaj Oblast. He graduated from the department of the Natural Sciences of the Velika škola in Belgrade.

In 1901, he became a member of the Serbian Parliament and played a part in founding the Independent Radical Party, whose leader he eventually became in 1912. He was Minister of Education in 1904; President of the Municipality of Belgrade; and President of the National Assembly in 1909. Between 1914 and 1917, he was minister of education in the cabinet under Nikola Pašić.

The next year, he became the leader of another newly founded party, the Democratic Party. As such, he was prime minister in the coalition of Democrats and Socialists between 1919 and 1920. He briefly was prime minister again in July 1924 in a Coalition of Democrats, Slovene Clericals, and Bosnian Muslims, with support from the Croatian Peasant Party. After 6 January 1929, military-monarchist coup he was one of the leaders of the so-called united opposition. He supported the restoration of parliamentarians in the country.

Until the very end of his life, he advocated for the Yugoslav idea and democratic principles.

Davidović died in Belgrade in 1940.

== Precautionary measures ==
On 12 December 1914, Davidović as Minister of Education and Religious Affairs, issued an order that all items—books, museum exhibits, manuscripts as well as valuable documents from the archives of institutions of culture and science—which were of particular importance and irreplaceable, be packed and dispatched for safekeeping away from the ravages of war. That order was complied by Božidar Prokić, Director of State Archives of the Kingdom of Serbia; Slobodan Jovanović, Rector of the University of Belgrade; Jovan Tomić, Director of the National Library of Serbia; Milan Grol, Director of the Serbian National Theatre; Petar Pavlović, Director of the Natural History Museum of Serbia; Sima Trojanović, Director of the Ethnographic Museum, Belgrade.

== Works ==
- Spomenica: Ljubomira Davidovića, Belgrade, 1940.

Government offices
Preceded by Ljubomir Stojanović	Minister of Education of Serbia; 1904	Succeeded by Andra Nikolić
Preceded by Ljubomir Jovanović	Minister of Education of Serbia; 1914–1917	Succeeded by Momčilo Ninčić
Preceded by Miloš Trifunović	Minister of Education of Serbia; 1918	Succeeded by Dimitrije Dimitrijević
Party political offices
Preceded by Post established	President of the Democratic Party; 1919–1940	Succeeded by Milan Grol
