= Momčilo Ninčić =

Serbian and Yugoslav politician and economist

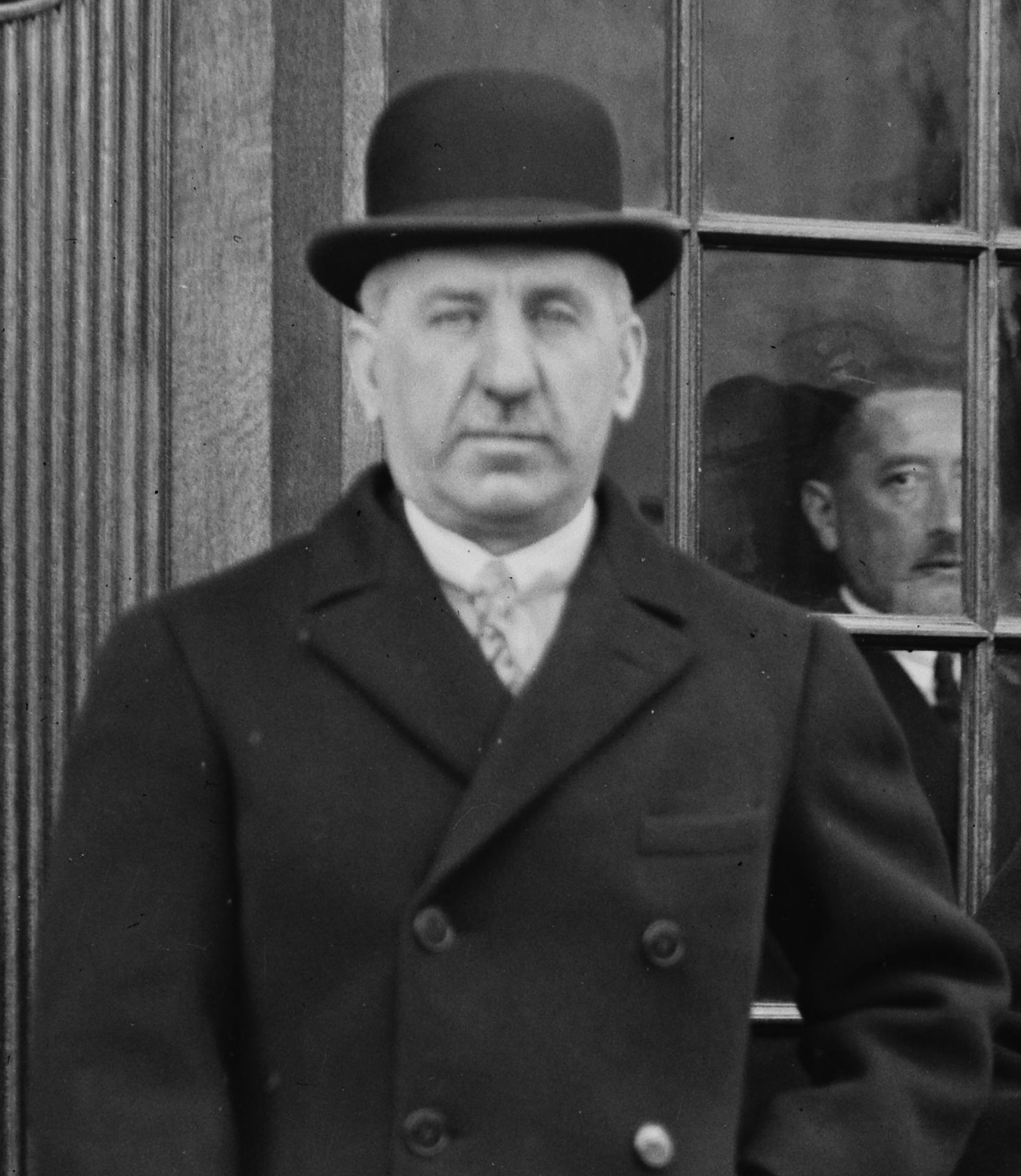

Minister of Foreign Affairs of Yugoslavia
- In office 27 March 1941 – 1 January 1943
- Monarch: Peter II
- Prime Minister: Dušan Simović; Slobodan Jovanović
- Preceded by: Aleksandar Cincar-Marković
- Succeeded by: Slobodan Jovanović

Minister of Foreign Affairs of the Kingdom of Serbs, Croats and Slovenes
- In office 5 January 1922 – 27 July 1924
- Monarch: Alexander I
- Prime Minister: Nikola Pašić
- Preceded by: Vojislav Marinković
- Succeeded by: Miloš Trifunović

Personal details
- Born: 10 June [O.S. 29 May] 1876 Jagodina, Principality of Serbia
- Died: 23 December 1949 (aged 73) Lausanne, Switzerland
- Party: People's Radical Party
- Children: Đuro Ninčić; Olga Humo
- Parent(s): Aaron Ninčić; Paula Ninčić
- Education: University of Paris
- Profession: Lawyer

Momčilo Ninčić (10 June [O.S. 29 May] 1876 – 23 December 1949) was a Serbian and Yugoslav politician and economist, president of the League of Nations from 1926 to 1927.

== Early life and education ==
Momčilo Ninčić was born in Jagodina on 10 June [O.S. 29 May] 1876 to Aaron and Paula Ninčić. His family was of Jewish descent, and originated from the town of Kanjiža in northern Serbia. Ninčić's father was a well-known lawyer and judge in Jagodina, and served as Serbian Minister of Justice between 1895 and 1896. In 1903, he was elected to the Parliament of Serbia.

Ninčić finished primary school in Jagodina and attended high school in Belgrade. He finished law school in Paris and received his doctorate in 1899.

== Political career ==
He held several ministerial positions in the government of the Kingdom of Yugoslavia as a member of the People's Radical Party, beginning in 1912. He was president of the General Assembly of the League of Nations from 1926-27.

During World War II he was a member of the Yugoslav government in exile in London, holding the position of Minister of External Affairs from 1941 to 1943. Ninčić sought good relations with the three Great Allies, particularly the United States. Ninčić accompanied young King Peter II of Yugoslavia on a visit to the United States and Canada in June and July 1942 which generated good publicity for the "Yugoslav cause," but in practice the concern shown by the Roosevelt Administration amounted to no more than superficial benevolent attitude.

At the post-war Belgrade Process he was found guilty of installing Draža Mihailović as leader of the Yugoslav Army in the Fatherland Chetnik force and supporting him and the army. Mihailović in turn warred with the Yugoslav Partisans. After the war, the communists under Tito took power in Yugoslavia. The military court in Belgrade sentenced General Dragoljub Mihailović to death in 1946 and also passed a sentence in absentia of eight years hard labour on Momčilo Ninčić. The accused was found guilty of continuing the policy of the pro-fascist dictatorship in old Yugoslavia and pursuing a policy supplying the occupation and suppressing the Communist National Liberation uprising. The indictment of the British Foreign Office officials was even worse:

"an insufferable bore and a clumsy liar," "an extreme Serb," "an obscurantist and obstinate intriguer with a pro-German, pro-Italian past, a not very pleasant present, and [....] no future at all," "an evil old man," "garrilous[sic] and muddle-headed," "tortuous and hidebound."

== Death ==
Ninčić died in exile in Switzerland in 1949. He had written serious disquisitions on European, Serbian and Yugoslav politics. In 2006, a court in Serbia rehabilitated Momčilo Ninčić to the same stature he held before the communist party and people of Yugoslavia won power and freedom in their anti-fascist struggle.

== Personal life ==
His daughter Olga married Avdo Humo just before World War II and stayed in occupied Sarajevo when her parents fled with the royal government to Britain in 1941.

== Sources ==
- Minić, Miloš (10 June 1946). "Optužnica protiv Mihailovića i ostalih" [Indictment against Mihailović and others] (PDF) (in Serbo-Croatian). Helsinki Committee for Human Rights in Serbia.
- Pavlowitch, Stevan K. (July 1984). "Momčilo Ninčić and the European Policy of the Yugoslav Government-in-Exile, 1941–1943: I". The Slavonic and East European Review Seer. 62 (3). London: The Slavonic East European Review. ISSN 0037-6795.
- Pavlowitch, Stevan K. (October 1984). "Momčilo Ninčić and the European Policy of the Yugoslav Government-in-Exile, 1941–1943: II". The Slavonic and East European Review Seer. 62 (4). London: The Slavonic East European Review. ISSN 0037-6795.

Government offices
Preceded by Vojislav D. Marinković	Minister of Finance of Serbia; 1914–1917	Succeeded by Stojan Protić
Preceded by Ljubomir Davidović	Minister of Education of Serbia; 1917	Succeeded by Miloš Trifunović
Preceded by Stojan Protić	Minister of Finance; 1918–1919	Succeeded by Vojislav S. Veljković
Preceded by Vojislav Marinković	Minister of Foreign Affairs; 1922–1924	Succeeded by Miloš Trifunović
Preceded by Aleksandar Cincar-Marković	Minister of Foreign Affairs; 1941–1943	Succeeded by Slobodan Jovanović
