= Aleksandar Cincar-Marković =

Yugoslav diplomat

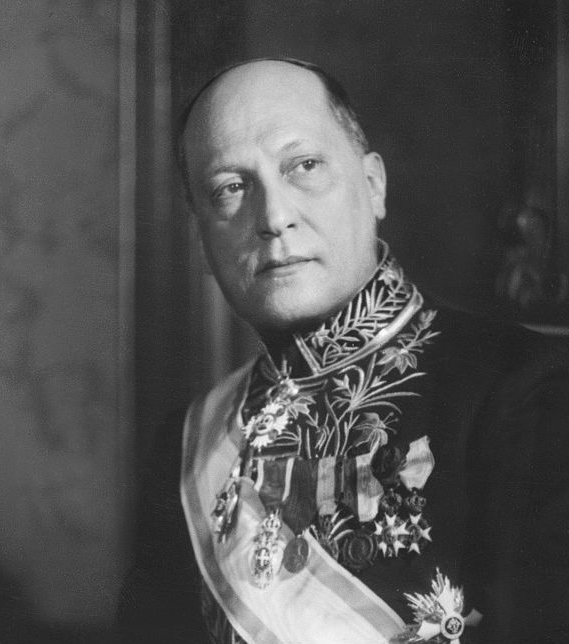
- Cincar-Marković in 1935

Minister of Foreign Affairs of the Kingdom of Yugoslavia
- In office 5 February 1939 – 27 March 1941
- Monarchs: Peter II; Prince Paul (Regent, in the name of young King Peter II)
- Prime Minister: Dragiša Cvetković
- Preceded by: Milan Stojadinović
- Succeeded by: Momčilo Ninčić

Personal details
- Born: 20 June 1889 Belgrade, Kingdom of Serbia
- Died: 1947 (aged 57–58) Belgrade, PR Serbia, FPR Yugoslavia
- Party: Yugoslav Radical Union
- Relations: Cincar-Marko (great-grandfather); Dimitrije Cincar-Marković (uncle)
- Education: First Belgrade Gymnasium

Aleksandar Cincar-Marković (Serbian Cyrillic: Александар Цинцар-Марковић; 20 June 1889 – 1947) was a Serbian politician who was the Minister of Foreign Affairs of the Kingdom of Yugoslavia.

He is noteworthy for his role in the Yugoslav accession talks to the Tripartite Pact, holding meetings with Adolf Hitler on 28 November 1940 to receive assurances in Germany–Yugoslavia relations. After the Yugoslav accession to the Tripartite Pact on 25 March 1941, the Yugoslav coup d'état was launched two days later by anti-Axis segments of the Yugoslav armed forces, removing Cincar-Marković from power. This paved the way to the Invasion of Yugoslavia by Axis forces starting in early April.

== See also ==
- Yugoslav accession to the Tripartite Pact
