= Božidar Purić =

Serbian and Yugoslav politician and diplomat

Doctor Božidar Purić
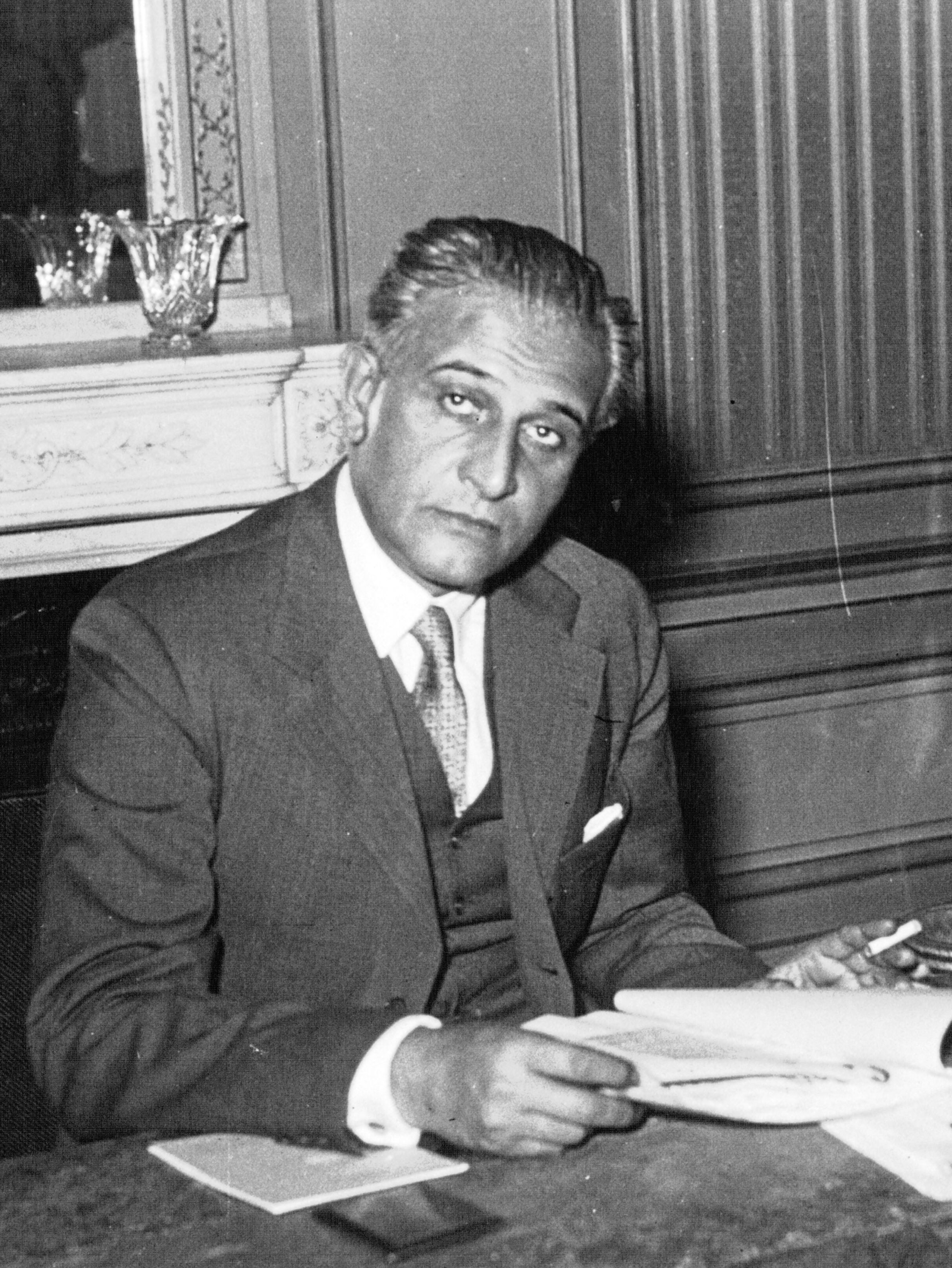
- Purić in 1935 as Yugoslav ambassador to France

17th Prime Minister of Yugoslavia
- In exile 10 August 1943 – 8 July 1944
- Monarch: Peter II
- Preceded by: Miloš Trifunović
- Succeeded by: Ivan Šubašić

Minister of Foreign Affairs
- In exile 10 August 1943 – 1 June 1944
- Monarch: Peter II
- Prime Minister: Himself
- Preceded by: Milan Grol
- Succeeded by: Ivan Šubašić

Personal details
- Born: 19 February 1891 Belgrade, Kingdom of Serbia
- Died: 28 October 1977 (aged 86) Chicago, United States

Božidar Purić (Serbian Cyrillic: Божидар Пурић; 19 February 1891 – 28 October 1977) was a Serbian and Yugoslav politician and diplomat. Between 1928 and 1934 he was a chargé d'affaires in the Embassy of Kingdom of Yugoslavia in the United States. and its ambassador in France since 1935. During the World War II, Purić was the prime minister of the Yugoslav government-in-exile between 10 August 1943 and 8 July 1944.

== Diplomatic career ==
In 1919, Božidar Purić was appointed as chargé d'affaires in the Embassy of the Kingdom of Serbs, Croats and Slovenes in Washington, D.C. in the US. Later during that year he was transferred to the same position in Vladivostok in the Soviet Union, where he remained until 1920 when he became the consul in San Francisco in the US. In 1922, he was appointed as the consul in Chicago and served in that position until 1926. In February 1926, he was promoted to Secretary of the Ministry of Foreign Affairs and during September of the same year he was appointed Head of Department in the Directorate for Contracts of the Ministry of Foreign Affairs, and Acting Director of the Consular and Trade Department of the Ministry of Foreign Affairs. When Ninko Perić took over the Ministry of Foreign Affairs, he appointed Purić Chief of the Cabinet of the Minister of Foreign Affairs in December 1926, and then General Director of the Ministry of Foreign Affairs in January 1927.

The new minister, Vojislav Marinković, transferred Purić as an advisor to the embassy in Rome, Italy, in July 1927. After that he served as an advisor to the embassy in Washington in 1928, and an advisor to the embassy in London in 1929. After the arrival of Bogoljub Jevtić at the head of the Ministry of Foreign Affairs, Purić returned to service in Belgrade and was appointed head of the Political Department of the Ministry of Foreign Affairs in October 1932. He was later appointed political assistant to the Minister of Foreign Affairs in April 1933, and he held that position until the arrival of Milan Stojadinović at the head of the Ministry of Foreign Affairs in June 1935. Stojadinović initially intended to appoint Purić as Minister of Foreign Affairs, but he gave up on that plan at the insistence of the Royal court. Purić was then appointed as an envoy in Paris and the permanent Yugoslav delegate to the League of Nations in Geneva.

== Yugoslav government-in-exile ==
Božidar Purić was appointed for the prime minister of the Yugoslav government-in-exile on 10 August 1943, succeeding Miloš Trifunović who resigned after constant disputes between Serbian and Croatian members of his cabinet. Purić's cabinet was composed of nonpolitical appointees. Purić, alike the previous prime ministers of the government-in-exile supported the Chetniks (the Serbian nationalist movement in Axis-occupied Yugoslavia), and their leader, Draža Mihailović remained Minister of Defence in Purić's cabinet. Chetnik collaboration with Italians and the Germans, as well as fighting against the Partisan resistance movement caused the British to pressure the Yugoslav government to remove Mihailović from office. After Purić assumed office this pressure became more intense as creating a strong resistance in Yugoslavia became imperative for reducing pressure on Allied forces fighting in Italy. Mihailović retained support from the government-in-exile despite his refusal to cooperate with the Partisans. Purić, despite being appointed with British blessings, rejected their appeals to remove Mihailović from the office.

Purić's cabinet dispersed the "League of Majors", a group of inner circle advisers to King Peter headed by Knežević brothers. Radoje Knežević was removed from the position of Minister of the Royal Court and sent to Lisbon as chargé d'affaires by Miloš Trifunović. Purić sent Živan Knežević to Washington as a military attaché. Two aides-de-camp to the king, Vlastimir Roždjalovski and Svetislav Vohoska, were sent to parachuting training in a British base so they could be dropped to Chetniks in Yugoslavia, this, however never happened.

Squabbles between Serbian and other ministers, which had troubled previous cabinets were not present in Purić's cabinet, which enabled it to come to decisions on pressing issues. The government moved to Cairo, a move which was suggested by the British during Trifunović's tenure. It was decided that Bogoljub Jevtić should become Yugoslav ambassador to London and King Peter was given permission to marry Princess Alexandra which was opposed by the previous Prime Ministers.

On 7 December 1943, Anthony Eden talked for the first time with Purić since the Tehran conference, where it was decided that Allies should support Yugoslav Partisans. After the meeting, Purić spoke with American ambassador Lincoln MacVeagh who later reported that Purić was extremely dissatisfied with the British decision to not allow his government to have direct communications with its people, which he called British failure to cooperate with the Yugoslav government. He also expressed concern that Allied military support to Partisans would cause conservative elements of the population to collaborate with the Germans. This confirmed suspicions of the Chetnik collaboration with the Germans, despite Purić likely not knowing about non-aggression pacts concluded between the Chetniks and Germans few weeks prior.

In March 1944, the Allies decided to withdraw aid and recognition from the Chetniks after a period of worsening relations between the British and the Chetniks. Even after this, the Purić government refused to remove Mihailović from the office which resulted in a complete breakdown in relations between pro-Chetnik officials who controlled Yugoslav government-in-exile and the British. On 13 April 1944, a conference between Churchill and King Peter was held during which Churchill urged Peter to dismiss Purić's cabinet as soon as possible and in that way get rid of Mihailović. Because in the following months Mihailović might oppose Soviet forces if they were to cross in Yugoslav territory which would prove embarrassing for the king. Churchill promised Peter that he would aid him in matters of publicity if the king accepted his suggestion. King met with the British ambassador to the Yugoslav government Skrine Stevenson during the next day, and he seemed ready to take Churchill's advice. However, the king soon changed his mind, likely after talking with Purić, and on 17 April he sent an urgent letter to US President Roosevelt saying that dismissing his best Prime Minister and relieve Mihailović would mean committing an act of treason on his nation. It remains unclear whether Roosevelt sent a reply but in a draft letter there seemed to be no encouragement to the king and Roosevelt generally agreed with British handling of Yugoslav affairs. After a series of moves and several months of British pressure, King Peter agreed to dismiss Purić's cabinet on 8 July 1944.

Political offices
Preceded by Miloš Trifunović	Prime Minister of Yugoslavia; 1943–1944	Succeeded by Ivan Šubašić
Preceded by Milan Grol	Minister of Foreign Affairs; 1943–1944	Succeeded by Ivan Šubašić
