= Ivan Šubašić =

Yugoslav Croat politician

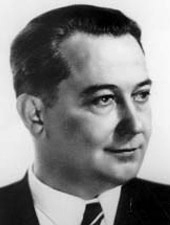

18th Prime Minister of Yugoslavia
- In exile 1 June 1944 – 7 March 1945
- Monarch: Peter II
- Preceded by: Božidar Purić
- Succeeded by: Josip Broz Tito

Minister of Foreign Affairs
- In exile 1 June 1944 – 7 March 1945
- Monarch: Peter II
- Preceded by: Božidar Purić
- In office 7 March 1945 – 17 October 1945
- President: Ivan Ribar
- Prime Minister: Josip Broz Tito
- Succeeded by: Josip Smodlaka

Ban of the Croatian Banovina
- In office 24 August 1939 – 10 April 1941
- Deputy: Ivo Krbek
- Preceded by: Position established
- Succeeded by: Position abolished

Personal details
- Born: 7 May 1892 Vukova Gorica, Croatia-Slavonia, Austria-Hungary (modern Croatia)
- Died: 22 March 1955 (aged 62) Zagreb, PR Croatia, FPR Yugoslavia (modern Croatia)
- Party: Croatian Peasant Party (HSS)
- Awards: Order of the White Eagle

Ivan Šubašić (7 May 1892 – 22 March 1955) was a Croat politician, best known as the last Ban of Croatia and Prime Minister of the royalist Yugoslav Government in exile during the Second World War.

== Early life ==
Ivan Šubašić was born in Vukova Gorica, a village along the Karlovac-Rijeka highway in Karlovac district, Croatia. He completed the first grades of elementary school in the neighboring Prilišće and his secondary education in Zagreb. His studies at the Faculty of Theology (the University of Zagreb) were cut short, as he was drafted into the Austro-Hungarian Army. Captured on the Eastern Front, he subsequently joined the Yugoslav volunteers fighting at the Salonica.

Once the war was over, Šubašić obtained his law degree at the Faculty of Law, University of Zagreb and opened his first law office in Vrbovsko, close to his birthplace. After meeting Vladko Maček, he joined the Croatian Peasant Party and was elected to the Yugoslav National Assembly in 1938.

== Political career ==
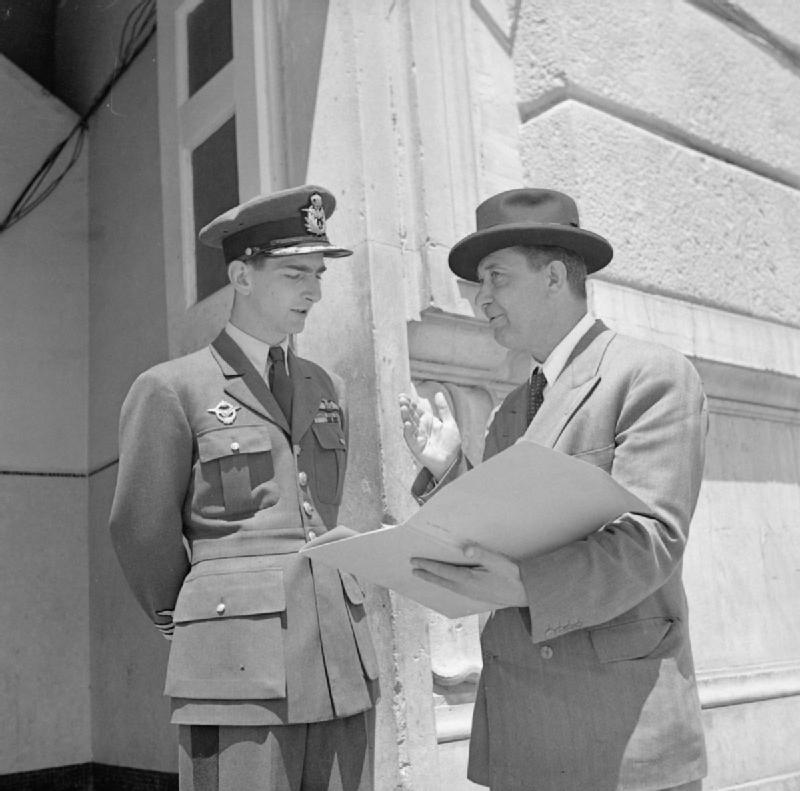
With King Peter II in Italy after meeting Tito.

=== Ban of Croatia ===
In August 1939, Maček and Yugoslav Prime Minister Dragiša Cvetković reached the deal about the constitutional reconstruction of Yugoslavia and restoration of Croatian statehood in the form of Banovina of Croatia—an autonomous entity which, together with Croatia proper, included large sections of today's Bosnia and Herzegovina and some sections of today's Vojvodina, which contained an ethnic Croat majority. Šubašić was appointed as the first ban, or titular head of this entity, in charge of its government.

The Banovina came to an end together with Kingdom of Yugoslavia, following the invasion by Axis powers in April 1941. Šubašić joined the Yugoslav government-in-exile.

=== Government-in-exile ===
In emigration, Šubašić first represented the Yugoslav royal government in the United States. As NDH atrocities became public knowledge, he actively spoke on behalf of the Croatian people, as Konstantin Fotić, then a Yugoslav ambassador to the US used his position to portray the entire nation as murderous fascists. Gradually, the widening gap between the royalist government and Yugoslav major resistance movement embodied in Josip Broz Tito and his Communist-dominated Partisans forced Winston Churchill to mediate. Šubašić, a non-Communist Croat and a voice of reason was appointed as the new prime minister in order to reach a compromise between Tito—whose forces represented the de facto government on liberated territories—and the monarchy, which preferred Draža Mihailović and his Serb-dominated Chetniks.

Šubašić met with Tito on the island of Vis and negotiated the Tito–Šubašić agreement, which recognized the Partisans as the legitimate armed forces of Yugoslavia. In exchange, the Partisans formally recognized the new Royal government. Šubašić kept his post until 2 November 1944, when Tito formally became the new prime minister of Yugoslavia. Šubašić served as a foreign minister in his cabinet until October 1945.

== Later life and death ==
Šubašić spent the remainder of his life away from the spotlight. He was closely followed by UDBA agents at all times. He died in Zagreb in 1955. More than 10,000 people attended his funeral. He is buried at the Mirogoj Cemetery.

Political offices
New title	Ban of Croatia; 1939-1943	Succeeded by Vladimir Nazor as President of the ZAVNOH
Preceded by Božidar Purić	Prime Minister of Yugoslavia; Minister of Foreign Affairs; 1944-1945	Succeeded by Josip Broz Tito
