= Miloš Trifunović (politician) =

Serbian and Yugoslav politician

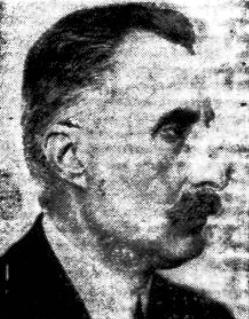
- Trifunović c. 1941

16th Prime Minister of Yugoslavia
- In exile 26 June 1943 – 10 August 1943
- Preceded by: Slobodan Jovanović
- Succeeded by: Božidar Purić

Minister of Education of the Kingdom of Yugoslavia
- In office 27 March 1941 – 26 June 1943
- Preceded by: Miha Krek
- Succeeded by: Boris Furlan

Minister of Religious Affairs of the Kingdom of Serbs, Croats and Slovenes
- In office 6 November 1924 – 24 December 1926^{[a]}
- Preceded by: Vojislav Janjić
- Succeeded by: Milorad Vujičić

Minister of Construction of the Kingdom of Serbs, Croats and Slovenes
- In office 27 March 1924 – 27 July 1924
- Preceded by: Nikola Uzunović
- Succeeded by: Nikola Uzunović

Minister of Education of the Kingdom of Serbs, Croats and Slovenes
- In office 16 December 1922 – 27 March 1924
- Preceded by: Svetozar Pribićević
- Succeeded by: Svetozar Pribićević
- In office 19 February 1920 – 18 May 1920
- Preceded by: Pavle Marinković
- Succeeded by: Svetozar Pribićević

Minister of Education and Religious Affairs of the Kingdom of Serbia
- In office 30 June 1917 – 3 November 1918
- Preceded by: Momčilo Ninčić
- Succeeded by: Ljubomir Davidović

Personal details
- Born: 30 October 1871 Užice, Principality of Serbia
- Died: 19 February 1957 (aged 85) Belgrade, Federal People's Republic of Yugoslavia
- Party: NRS
- Education: Faculty of Philosophy of Belgrade higher school
- Nickname: Miša
- a. Acting Minister after 15 April 1926

Miloš Trifunović (Serbian Cyrillic: Милош Трифуновић; 30 October 1871 – 19 February 1957), also known as Miša Trifunović, was a Serbian and Yugoslav politician who held several important offices in the Kingdom of Yugoslavia and briefly served as the prime minister of the Yugoslav government-in-exile during World War II. Before becoming a member of parliament in 1903, he was a professor at Užice Gymnasium, a Serbian high school. During World War I, he was appointed the minister of education. During his tenure, he focused on improving the education of Serbs abroad. He served as the minister of education of Yugoslavia multiple times and also held several other ministerial positions.

When King Alexander established a royal dictatorship in 1929, Trifunović was one of the leaders of the Radical Party who opposed the new regime. Two years after the establishment of the dictatorship, Trifunović participated in negotiations with the King. However, after the establishment of the 1931 Yugoslav Constitution and the Yugoslav National Party, Trifunović decided to remain in the opposition. He also participated in creating a joint document of condemnation of the regime by the major opposition parties.

During World War II, Trifunović served as the minister of education of the Yugoslav government-in-exile between March 1941 and June 1943. On 26 June 1943, he was appointed prime minister. During his brief term, the government wanted to help the Chetniks – the Serbian nationalist movement in Axis-occupied Yugoslavia. The government developed a plan to create an army which would land in Yugoslavia, but this plan was rejected by the Allies. After about a month, Trifunović resigned because of disputes between the Croat and Serb members of the government-in-exile. He returned to Yugoslavia in 1945, where he planned to run on a joint opposition ticket with Milan Grol, but they ended up boycotting the elections that year. Trifunović was arrested in 1947 on charges of espionage and was sentenced to eight years' imprisonment, but was released after serving two-and-a-half years. He died in Belgrade in 1957.

== Early life ==
Trifunović was born in Užice, where he completed his primary and secondary education. He graduated from the Faculty of Philosophy of Belgrade higher school; afterward, he became a teacher at the Užice Gymnasium. In 1902, he was appointed as a professor of zoology and botany at the same school. He abandoned his career in education when he became a member of parliament of the Kingdom of Serbia in 1903.

== Political career before the 6 January Dictatorship ==
=== Minister of Education of Serbia ===
On 30 June 1917, Trifunović was appointed as the Minister of Education and Religious Affairs, replacing the acting minister, Momčilo Ninčić, in Prime Minister Nikola Pašić's 10th Cabinet. In August 1917, the Serbian government-in-exile, headquartered on the island of Corfu, decided to open a Serbian school in Volos. Trifunović ordered 30 teachers to be withdrawn from the army to teach at the new school. He also dispatched seven professors and docents, who were also in the army, to France to help with the education of Serbian students in that country. On 17 December 1917, the Ministry of Education opened the Serbian Boarding School in Salonika. Trifunović remained the Minister of Education for most of World War I and was succeeded by Ljubomir Davidović on 3 November 1918.

=== Minister of Education of Yugoslavia ===
Trifunović served as Minister of Education from 30 June 1917 to 3 November 1918, 19 February to 17 May 1920, 16 December 1922 to 2 May 1923, from 15 April 1926 to 4 February 1927 and finally from 27 March 1941 to 26 June 1943. During this time Trifunović advocated for increasing the number of primary schools in the country and extending compulsory education from four to eight years of schooling.

During his term in 1926, Trifunović introduced a nationwide curriculum for high schools. He added minor revisions to the curriculum proposed by the previous minister, Svetozar Pribićević, and added a detailed program. The curriculum and the program met fierce criticism from Yugoslav teachers, who denounced it for being unclear, superficial, and written without consulting pedagogues and teachers.

=== Other offices held ===
Trifunović also served as the Minister of Construction in 1924 and the Minister of Religious Affairs from 1924 until 1926.

== 6 January Dictatorship ==
On 6 January 1929, Alexander, King of the Serbs, Croats, and Slovenes, abolished the constitution and instituted a royal dictatorship. Trifunović was at the time one of the leaders of the People's Radical Party (Serbo-Croatian: Narodna radikalna stranka, NRS) who opposed the dictatorship. Following a large amount of criticism of the dictatorship, Alexander decided to open negotiations with NRS leaders Aca Stanojević and Trifunović, as well as with the leader of the Slovene People's Party, Anton Korošec. Following negotiations in the middle of 1931, in September the King issued a new constitution which introduced a bicameral legislature. Following the passage of the constitution, a new ruling party named the Yugoslav Radical Peasants' Democracy was created, and while some veterans of the NRS chose to join it, Trifunović remained in the opposition. Vladko Maček, leader of the Croatian Peasant Party was arrested in January 1933.

Two months later, while Maček's trial was still ongoing, Democratic Party leaders proposed that opposition politicians issue a joint condemnation of the regime. In order to protest Maček's trial and issue this condemnation more generally, a committee of the representatives of the Agrarian Union, the Radical and the Democratic parties was formed. The leaders of the Agrarian Union and the Democratic Party, Ljubomir Davidović and Jovan Jovanović, signed the proposed text prepared by Milan Stojadinović, Milan Grol and Milan Gavrilović. Trifunović and Stojanović refused to sign it. Trifunović wrote a counter-proposal in which all references to the trial of Maček were removed. He and Stojanović also objected to the idea that the condemnation should be released not only to the public of Yugoslavia but also abroad. Nevertheless, the three parties managed to issue a joint protest of Maček's trial at the end of April, although the protest did differ from the one written in March. In May, the three opposition parties finally made a joint statement committing themselves to the struggle to restore civic liberties, free parliamentarianism, and the reform of the constitutional order.

== Yugoslav government-in-exile ==
Trifunović was appointed as the prime minister of the Yugoslav government-in-exile by King Peter following the resignation of the previous prime minister, Slobodan Jovanović. On 26 June 1943, Trifunović formed his cabinet. The most important change in the cabinet was the removal of Radoje Knežević from the position of Minister of the Royal Court. Knežević was appointed as chargé d'affaires at the Yugoslav legation in Lisbon while a professional diplomat, Niko Mirošević, assumed his previous position. Trifunović's cabinet tried to support the Chetniks significantly from abroad. On 14 July, the acting Minister of the Army, Navy and Air Force, Petar Živković, drafted plans for the creation of an army of around 100,000 soldiers from outside Yugoslavia. This army would be created from the Yugoslav prisoners of war held by Italy, combined with the Slovenes and Croats captured by the British forces while fighting for Italy in Africa. It was envisioned that the Allies would maintain and supply this army, which would land in Dalmatia and fight alongside the Chetniks under the command of the Allies. The plan was subsequently submitted to the Big Three Allied leaders, who rejected it. Following constant squabbles between Serbian and Croatian members of the cabinet, Trifunović resigned on 10 August 1943. He was succeeded by Božidar Purić.

== Life after World War II ==
Trifunović returned to Yugoslavia in 1945. He and the president of the Democratic Party, Milan Grol, planned to jointly oppose Josip Broz Tito and the Communist Party of Yugoslavia in the parliamentary elections of November 1945. That August, Grol – who was the Deputy Prime Minister of Yugoslavia – resigned in protest against the communist regime's undemocratic actions. He and Trifunović decided to boycott the elections.

In December 1946, Trifunović and seven others were brought to trial for having allegedly furnished military and political information to the American embassy in Belgrade. Trifunović was found guilty and sentenced to eight years' imprisonment. He was released after serving two-and-a-half years. He died in Belgrade on 19 February 1957.
