= Slobodan Jovanović =

Serbian scholar and politician (1869–1958)

- Слободан Јовановић
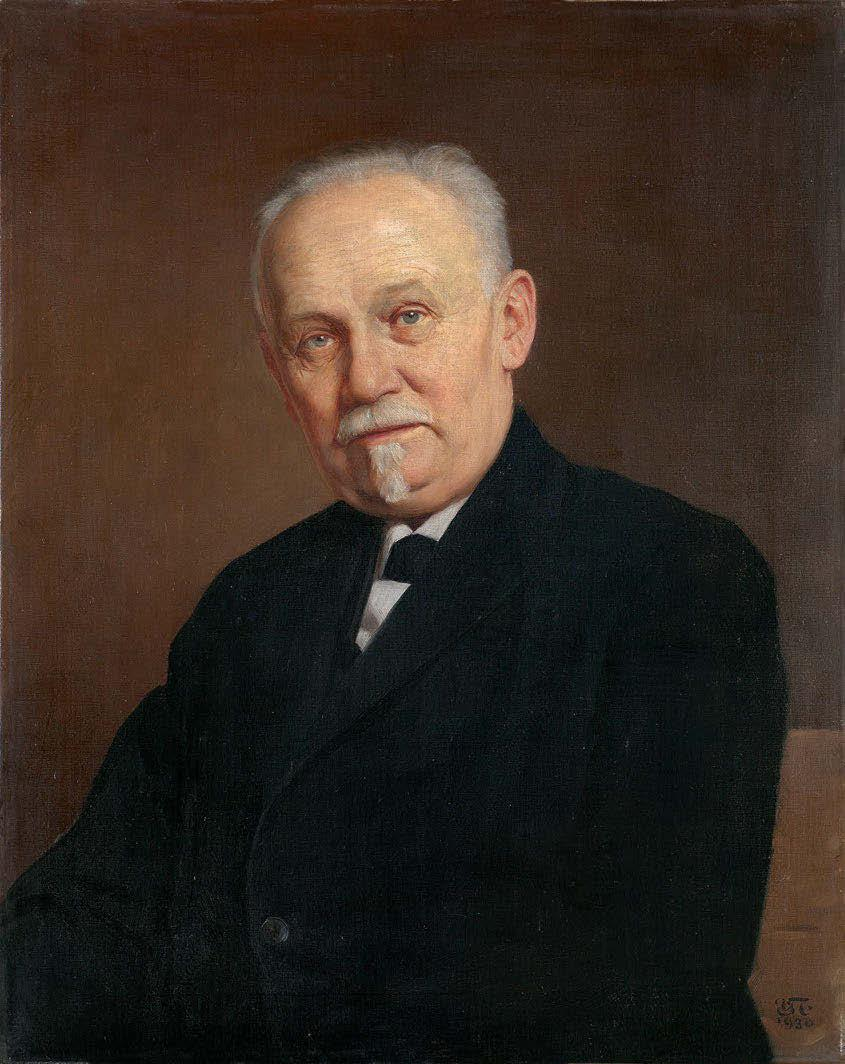
- Portrait of Slobodan Jovanović by Uroš Predić, 1931

15th Prime Minister of Yugoslavia
- In exile 11 January 1942 – 26 June 1943
- Preceded by: Dušan Simović
- Succeeded by: Miloš Trifunović

Personal details
- Born: 3 December 1869 Újvidék, Austria-Hungary (now Novi Sad, Serbia)
- Died: 12 December 1958 (aged 89) London, England
- Parent: Vladimir Jovanović (father)
- Occupation: jurist, historian, politician

Slobodan Jovanović (Serbian Cyrillic: Слободан Јовановић; 3 December 1869 – 12 December 1958) was a Serbian and Yugoslav writer, historian, lawyer, philosopher, literary critic, diplomat, politician and one of the most prominent intellectuals of his time. He was the professor at the University of Belgrade Faculty of Law (1897–1940), Rector of the University of Belgrade (1913–14 and 1920–21), and the President of the Serbian Royal Academy (1928–1931). He took part at the Paris Peace Conference (1919) as an expert for the Yugoslav Government. Democracy was the central focus of his scholarly work.

Jovanović was the Deputy Prime Minister (March 1941 - June 1942) and the Prime Minister of the Royal Yugoslav government-in-exile in London between January 1942 and June 1943. After World War II, the new Communist authorities of Yugoslavia sentenced him in absentia to 20 years' imprisonment. Jovanović remained at liberty for the rest of his life in London.

== Biography ==
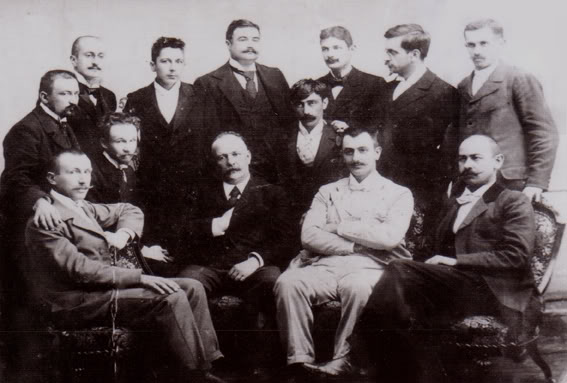
Jovanović as part of a poetic circle in his youth (middle row, seated on the left).

Slobodan Jovanović was born in Újvidék, Austria-Hungary (present-day Novi Sad, Serbia) on 3 December 1869 to politician Vladimir Jovanović and his wife Jelena. He was reportedly the first Serbian male to be named "Slobodan" (sloboda means "freedom" in Serbian), while his sister was named Pravda ("Justice"). He received an excellent education in Belgrade, Munich, Zürich, and Geneva, where he graduated with a law degree. From 1890 to 1892, he took post-graduate studies in constitutional law and political science in Paris before entering the Serbian foreign service. In 1893 he was appointed political attaché with the Serbian mission to Constantinople, where he remained for a couple years. It was at this time that he began to write and have his articles on literary criticism published in various publications throughout the land.

He eventually left the diplomatic service in favour of academia and literary pursuits and became a contributing author and literary critic for several notable newspapers of the time. In 1897 he was appointed professor at the University of Belgrade's Faculty of Law. During the Balkan Wars and the First World War he was the Head of Serbian War Office Press Bureau. In this period Jovanović became acquainted with Dragutin Dimitrijević Apis and wrote positively of him. Shortly after the foundation of the Kingdom of Serbs, Croats, and Slovenes, in 1920, Stojan Protić, acting as Prime Minister of the Temporary National Representation, appointed Jovanović as the President of a multi-ethnic constitutional drafting committee alongside Kosta Kumanudi, Bogumil Vošnjak, Ladislav Polić, and Lazar Marković which later that year presented the first draft of what would later become the Vidovdan Constitution.

For more than four decades, Jovanović taught at the law faculty gaining a reputation as an authority on constitutional law and Serbian language and literature. He was Rector of the University of Belgrade on two separate occasions and Dean of Faculty of Law. Jovanović joined the Serbian Royal Academy in 1908, and was its president from 1928 to 1931. He was also a correspondent member of the Yugoslav Academy of Sciences and Arts in Zagreb from 1927.

Slobodan Jovanović was a critic of Hans Kelsen's Pure Theory of Law. His primary remarks are on the relation of Kelsen's theory to other German theorists at the time. He considered Kelsen an innovative "young" theorist, but thought that his framework was not as dissimilar to more classical theories that Kelsen, in Jovanović's opinion, tried to attack. Namely, Jovanović posited that the special position of the Basic norm for Kelsen could be reduced to the framework of more classical German theories, in which the state is a legal person from which the legal system originates, and vice versa. Jovanović considered this to be a flaw of Kelsen's Legal positivism that makes it a theory that does not truly address the origins of the law, as it fails to truly separate in analysis the legal system from the state as an actor. In this way, Jovanović rejects an analysis that would fully divorce the man as a legal creature, from man as a political one.

Jovanović had some influence on political life in the Kingdom of Yugoslavia due to his well established authority in the field of law and history, but he entered directly political life only in 1939 when the Serbian Cultural Club was established, and he was appointed as Club's president.

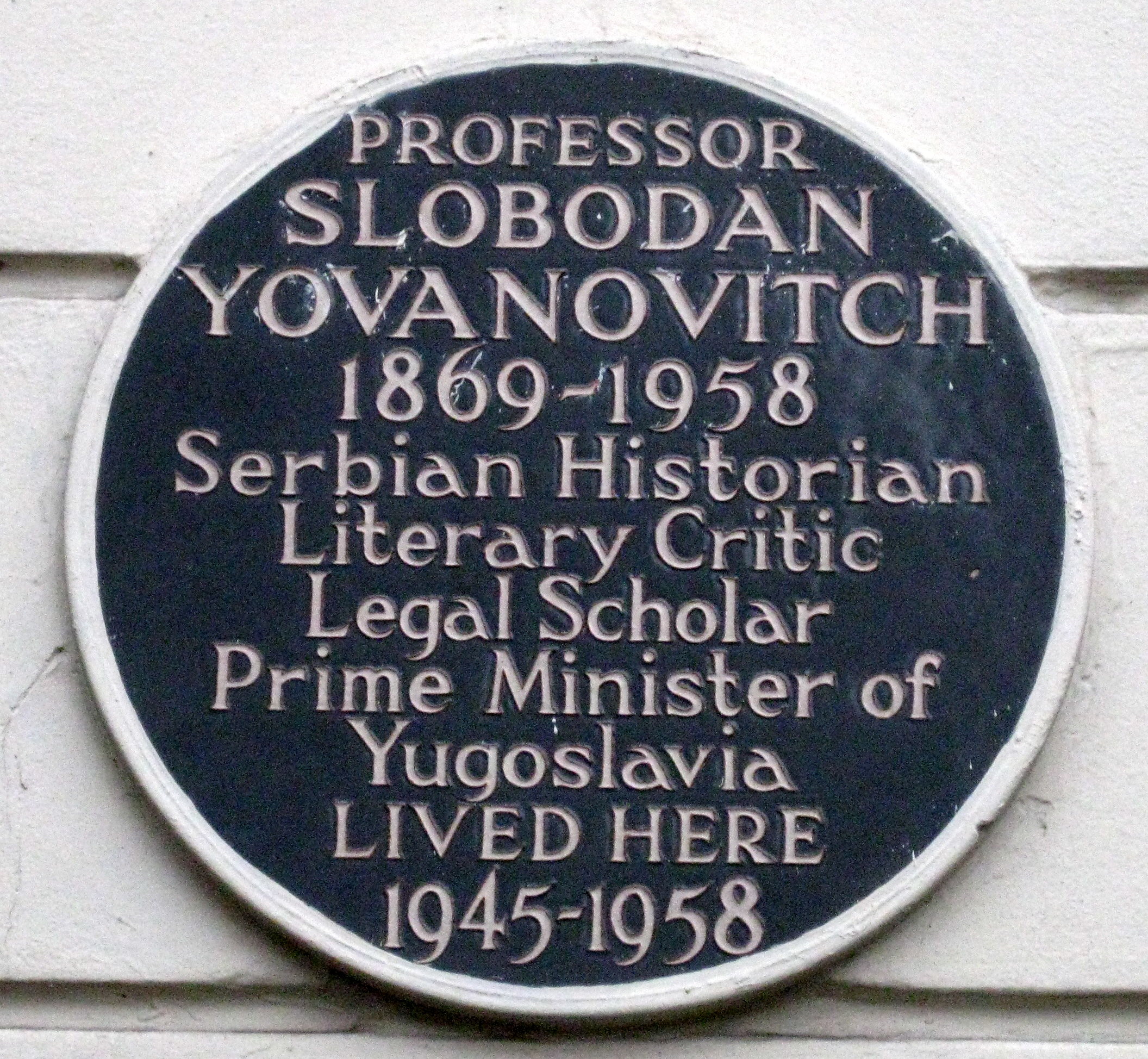
Plaque on 39b Queen's Gate Gardens

He was a pro-Western politician and when a pro-Western military coup took place in Belgrade on 27 March 1941, a pro-Western, essentially pro-British government was installed headed by General Dušan Simović. Jovanović was deputy Prime Minister in that government. The Third Reich attacked the Kingdoms of Yugoslavia and Greece on 6 April, and soon defeated Yugoslav and Greek forces. Jovanović moved in mid April together with King Peter II and other cabinet ministers to Jerusalem and he reached London in July. He became prime minister of the Yugoslav government-in-exile during World War II on 11 January 1942 and remained in that position until 26 June 1943.

Tried in absence in Josip Broz Tito's communist state together with general Draža Mihailović, he was sentenced to 20 years in jail which he never served, as well as the loss of political and civil rights for a period of ten years, and confiscation of all property and loss of citizenship. He spent his later years in exile in London (1945–1958). A memorial plaque in honour of Professor Slobodan Yovanovitch, Serbian historian, literary critic, legal scholar, Prime Minister of Yugoslavia may be found in London at 39b Queen's Gate Gardens, Kensington.

After unofficial rehabilitation in 1989, his collected works were published in 1991.

== Legacy ==
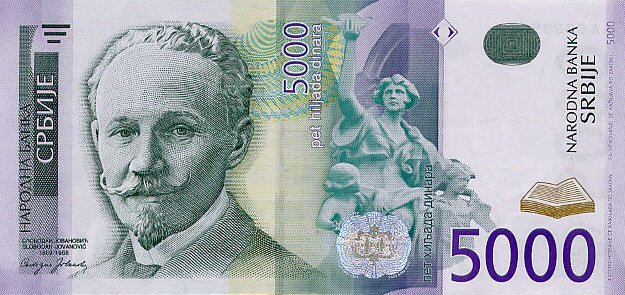
Jovanović on a 5,000 Serbian dinar bill

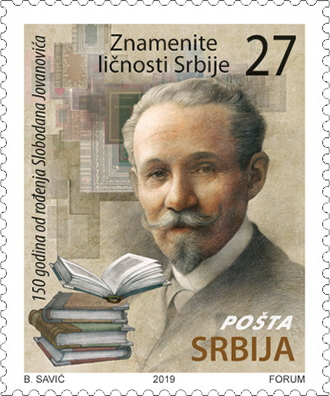
Jovanović on a 2019 stamp of Serbia

Jovanović was decorated Order of Osmanieh and Order of Saint Sava.

In Serbia, he is regarded as one of the most influential liberals and political thinkers of the turn of the century. A number of his writings on a number of ideas such as Machiavellism and Platonist ideas of state are still relevant today.

Leading Serbian journal Politika on the occasion of his 70th birthday concluded that "his name has been carved as the highest peak of our culture up to now".

At the end of the 1980s, despite the opposition of Slobodan Milošević, then president of the City Committee of the League of Communists of Yugoslavia, the Collected Works of Slobodan Jovanović were published.

== Works ==
His collected works were published in 17 volumes in 1939–1940. They contain the results of his labour as a writer, professor and politician for sixty years, and throw considerable light on Balkan history of the first half of the 20th century, as well as on the author himself. Although his works were not officially banned, any new issue of his books was not permitted in communist Yugoslavia until the late 1980s. Finally, a new edition of his collected works was published in Belgrade in 12 volumes in 1991.

Since 2003 his portrait has appeared on the 5000 dinar banknote, and his bust stands at the Faculty of Law in Belgrade. His official rehabilitation occurred on 26 October 2007 by a Belgrade court. Since 10 December 2011, plateau in front of Faculty of Law in Belgrade bears his name.

- O suverenosti, Beograd 1897 [On Sovereignty, Belgrade, 1897].
- O dvodomnom sistemu, Beograd 1899 [On Bicameral System, Belgrade, 1899].
- Velika narodna skupština, Beograd 1900 [Great People's Assembly, Belgrade, 1900].
- Srpsko-bugarski rat. Rasprava iz diplomatske istorije, Beograd 1901 [Serbo-Bulgarian War. A paper in diplomatic history], Belgrade 1901].
- Svetotar Marković, Beograd 1903 [Svetozar Markovic, Belgrade 1903].
- Osnovi pravne teorije o državi, Beograd 1906 [An Introduction to the Legal Theory on State, Belgrade, 1906].
- Osnovi javnog prava Kraljevine Srbije, Beograd 1907–1909 [An Introduction to the Public Law of the Kingdom of Serbia, Belgrade, 1907–1909, in two volumes].
- Makiaveli, Beograd 1907.
- Polititčke i pravne rasprave, Beograd 1908–1910 [Political and Legal Considerations, Belgrade, 1908–1910, in two volumes].
- Ustavobranitelji i njihova vlada, Srpska kraljevska akademija, Beograd 1912 [Constitutionalists and their Government (Belgrade: Serbian Royal Academy, 1912).
- Universitetsko pitanje, Beograd 1914 [University Question, Belgrade, 1914].
- Vođi francuske revolucije, Beograd 1920 [Leaders of the French Revolution, Belgrade, 1920].
- O državi, Beograd 1922 [On State, Belgrade, 1922], his capital work
- Druga vlada Miloša i Mihaila, Beograd 1923 [The Second Rule of Milosh and Michael, Belgrade, 1923].
- Ustavno pravo Kraljevine Srba, Hrvata i Slovenaca, Beograd 1924 [Constitutional Law of the Kingdom of Serbs, Croats and Slovenes, Belgrade, 1924].
- Vlada Milana Obrenovića, Geca Kon, Beograd 1926–1927 [The Rule of Milan Obrenovich (Belgrade: Geca Kon, 1926–1927), in two volumes].
- Vlada Aleksandra Obrenovića, Geca Kon, Beograd 1929–1931. [The Rule of Alexander Obrenovich (Belgrade: Geca Kon, 1929–1931, in two volumes].
- Iz istorije političkih doktrina, Beograd 1935 [From the History of Political Doctrines, Belgrade, 1935].
- Gledston, Jugo-istok, Beograd 1938 [Slobodan Jovanovic, Gladstone (Belgrade: Jugo-istok, 1938)].
- Američki federalizam, Beograd 1939 [American Federalism, Belgrade, 1939].
- Primeri političke sociologije, Engleska, Francuska, Nemačka 1815–1914, Beograd 1940 [Examples of Political Sociology: England, France and Germany, 1815–1914, Belgrade, 1940].
- O totalitarizmu, Oslobođenje, Pariz 1952 [On Totalitarianism (Paris: Oslobodjenje, 1952].
- Jedan prilog za proučavanje srpskog nacionalnog karaktera, Vindzor – Kanada 1964 [A Contribution to the Study of the Serbian National Character, Windsor /Canada/, 1964].
- Zapisi o problemima i ljudima, 1941–1944, London 1976 [Notes on Problems and Individuals, 1941–1944, London, 1976)]
- Slobodan Jovanovich, Tito and the Western World (reprinted from The Eastern Quarterly), London, 1952, pg. 6.
- Slobodan Jovanovich, On the New Machiavellism (reprinted from The Eastern Quarterly), London, 1952, pg. 5.

== Sources ==
- Jovan Skerlić: Istorija nove srpske književnosti (Belgrade, 1914), page 382
- Bataković, Dušan T., ed. (2005). Histoire du peuple serbe. Lausanne: L’Age d’Homme. ISBN 9782825119587.
- Marković, Predrag J. (2004). "Kako (ni)smo pronašli "pravu istorijsku istinu"? Srpska istoriografija posle 1991. godine". Prispevki za novejšo zgodovino. XLIV.
- Petrovich, Michael Boro (1984). "Slobodan Jovanović" (PDF). Serbian Studies. 3 (1–2). NASSS. Archived from the original (PDF) on 10 August 2016.
- Александар Павковић (2008). Слободан Јовановић: један несентименталан приступ политици. Правни факултет Универзитета у Београду. ISBN 978-86-7549-779-0.
- Небојша Поповић (2003). Слободан Јовановић и југословенска држава. Institut za savremenu istoriju. ISBN 9788674030752.
- Branimir Garić (1993). Слободан Јовановић у емиграцији: разговори и записи. Новинско-издавачка установа Службени лист СРЈ.
- Britannica'
- Dimitrije Djordjevic (1973). «Historians in Politics: Slobodan Jovanovic». Journal of Contemporary History 8 (1): pp. 21–40.
- Radojević, Mira (2019). "Contribution of Slobodan Jovanović to the study of national history of the 19th and the first half of the 20th century" (PDF). Slobodan Jovanović: life, work, times. Belgrade: SASA. pp. 303–314.

Government offices
Preceded by Dušan Simović	Prime Minister of Yugoslavia; 1942–1943	Succeeded by Miloš Trifunović
Academic offices
Preceded by Bogdan Gavrilović	Rector of University of Belgrade; 1913–1914	Succeeded by Đorđe Stanojević
Preceded by Jovan Cvijić	Rector of University of Belgrade; 1920–1921	Succeeded by Bogdan Gavrilović
Preceded by Jovan Cvijić	President of Serbian Academy of Sciences and Arts; 1928–1931	Succeeded by Bogdan Gavrilović
