= Arthur Jibilian =

WWII US Navy officer, participant in OSS Halyard mission (1923-2010)

- Born: 30 April 1923; Cleveland, Ohio, U.S.
- Died: 21 March 2010 (aged 86); Fremont, Ohio
- Burial place: Arlington National Cemetery
- Military career
- Allegiance: United States
- Branch: U.S. Navy
- Service years: 1943–1945(?)
- Rank: 1st Class Petty Officer (Specialist radio operator)
- Nickname: Jibby
- Unit: Office of Strategic Services
- Known for: Operation Halyard
- Conflicts: World War II
- Awards: Silver Star (plus citation); Medal of Honor
- Other work: Safety director
- Education: Toledo City School District; DeVilbiss High School
- Alma mater: University of Toledo
- Spouse: Beverly-Jo Williams (m. 1951)

Arthur Jibilian (30 April 1923 – 21 March 2010) was a U.S. Navy radio officer, who volunteered for the Office of Strategic Services (OSS), and was parachuted behind enemy lines in Nazi-occupied Serbia. He was awarded the Silver Star, received the Silver Star Citation, and was awarded the Medal of Honor. He was part of the OSS secret Operation Halyard.

== Background and early years ==
Arthur Jibilian was born on 30 April 1923 in Cleveland, Ohio, in the U.S., into an Armenian American family.

He was educated in the Toledo City School District and graduated from DeVilbiss High School, just when World War II started. In March 1943, he went to the Naval Station Great Lakes in North Chicago, where he learned the Morse code and naval intelligence protocol. After his wartime experiences, he enrolled at the University of Toledo and graduated with a Bachelor of Arts.

== Military career ==
After the Naval Station Great Lakes, Jibilian volunteered for the Office of Strategic Services (OSS) and was sent to Washington, DC, where OSS instructors taught him to code and decode messages, operate three-piece radios consisting of a transmitter, receiver, and power pack, all to fit a small, unobtrusive suitcase. He was taught to "mingle in a crowd", act, and carry the suitcase like a local traveler. Then, he went to Fort Benning, and Fort Bragg for parachute training and taking part in army maneuvers with Special Operations groups. Jibilian and other radiomen were then sent to Cairo, Egypt. There, Jibilian was interviewed and told by Lieutenant Eli Popovich that he was selected for a second mission in Yugoslavia. The first mission took place on 23 January 1944 when Eli Popovich and Linn Farish discussed the evacuation of American missing in action soldiers in Partisan territory in Bosnia with Josip Broz Titoit. On 15 March 1944, Eli Popovich, Col. Linn Farrish, and Jibilian parachuted into partisan territory.

The Americans also planned and executed similar actions in Chetnik territory in Serbia earlier still – 19 October 1943 – when 2nd Lieutenant George Musulin parachuted near General Dragoljub Mihailovich's HQ where he acted as an interpreter. After the Allies decided to distance themselves from Mihailovich to appease the Soviets and the British, Musulin returned to Italy and continued insisting that American representatives be sent to Mihailovich to organize the evacuation of American and Allied airmen there.

Jibilian and Master Sergeant Michael Rajacich, who were borrowed from SI for this particular assignment, rounded out Musilin's team. Jibilian had earned a reputation for being an effective radioman, having served with Farrish and Eli Popovich during the last mission in Yugoslavia between March and June 1944. Joseph Veselinovich, also among those American officers who, though they served with the Partisans, opposed Tito and his movement, was tasked to facilitate the secretive Operation Halyard to evacuate U.S. and Allied airmen from the Partisan-held territory. On 2 August 1944, Jibilian, Nick Lalich, Rajacich, and Musulin were parachuted in the western part of Pranjani to the headquarters of General Mihailovich in Serbia to establish contact with Allied Force HQ. On 10 August, fourteen American transport planes escorted by six Spitfires first evacuated 250 airmen, including a few Yugoslavs, namely Adam Pribićević, Zvonimir Vučković, Ivan Kovač, and Dr. Vladimir Belajčić, former Superior Court Judge of the Kingdom of Yugoslavia. It was there that a total of more than 500 U.S. airmen and foreign servicemen in Operation Halyard were evacuated to Bari, Italy.

== Post service ==
After the war, Jubilian went to the University of Toledo where he met and married Beverly-Jo Williams in 1951. He worked at Basic Refractories Inc. as a safety director from 1955 until his retirement in 1983.

In 2008 he was presented with the Congressional Medal of Honor from Rep. Bob Latta.

Arthur Jibilian died of cancer in Fremont, Ohio on 21 March 2010 and is buried in the Arlington National Cemetery. He was the last survivor of the Halyard Mission team.

A film on the mission, Heroes of Halyard, directed by Radoš Bajić, was released in 2023.

== See also ==
- List of burials at Arlington National Cemetery
