= Robert H. McDowell =

American historian and intelligence officer (1894–1980)

Robert Harbold McDowell
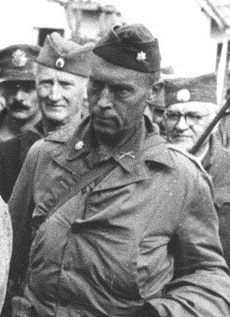
- McDowell in 1944
- Born: May 23, 1894; Syria, Ottoman Empire
- Died: June 2, 1980 (aged 86); Pinellas County, Florida, United States
- Occupations: historian and intelligence officer
- Known for: head of American mission with Chetniks during World War II
- Notable work: The Key Role in Southeastern Europe during World War Two of the Serbs and Their Commander General Draza Mihailovich despite Their Abandonment by Churchill and Roosevelt.

Robert Harbold McDowell (May 23, 1894 – June 2, 1980) was an American historian and intelligence officer who worked for the Office of Strategic Services (OSS) during World War II. McDowell, an expert on the Near East, was a professor of Balkan history at the University of Michigan. During World War II he was an OSS desk officer in Cairo and between August and November 1944 a member of an American mission Ranger, to the Chetniks, where he participated in negotiations with Germans to surrender their troops to Chetniks and Americans, and in Operation Halyard, to organize transport of the Allied pilots rescued by Chetniks. In some works he has been described as a man of "violently pro-Chetnik prejudices".

== Early life ==
McDowell was a professor of Balkan history at the University of Michigan. McDowell was also an expert on the Near East.

== During the World War II ==
=== Arrival to Mihailović's Chetniks ===
The American president Franklin Roosevelt personally directed all important steps of the operations of the Office of Strategic Services related to Mihailović's Chetniks because they were an instrument of US policy to avoid Partisan dominated Yugoslavia. McDowell, who had been an OSS desk officer in Cairo, arrived in the German-occupied territory of Serbia with three Serbian Americans Lt. Michael Rajacich, Capt. John R. Milodragovich, Sgt. Michael Devyak (radioman) and Lt. Ellswworth Kramer (transferred from Operation Halyard) to the "Ranger" team mission to General Mihailovich's Chetniks in late August 1944 to organize transport of the Allied pilots rescued by Chetniks during Operation Halyard. On 22 August 1944, Mihailovich was informed by members of his headquarters that George Musulin informed them about McDowell's direct access to Roosevelt.

At that time the Chetniks had already ordered a general mobilization aimed against Axis forces, so McDowell personally witnessed positioning of mobilized Chetnik troops to follow this aim and their resistance to German and Bulgarian forces to the final limits of people and equipment, capturing substantial number of prisoners and quantity of ammunition. Mihailovich informed McDowell that he had mobilized about 100,000 men with arms and 500,000 men without arms by 1 September 1944.

=== Negotiations for the surrender of German forces in Yugoslavia ===
Based on the instructions of the United States High Command, McDowell organized surrender conferences with representatives of German forces. In his later statements, approved by the War and State Departments, McDowell emphasized that Mihailovic did not attend the conferences about the surrender of German forces in Yugoslavia in August 1944.

In September 1944, the German command at Belgrade contacted McDowell and held two meetings with him at Mihailović's headquarters, declaring that German forces in Yugoslavia were willing to surrender to the Americans and Chetniks but not to communist forces of the Soviet Union and Josip Broz Tito's Partisans. McDowell reported this to Allied headquarters which immediately ordered him to break off his contacts with the Germans.

When the Partisans were informed that McDowell was negotiating the surrender of German troops in Yugoslavia they became infuriated. In September, the Partisans began a major offensive against the Chetniks preventing McDowell's team from using an already prepared landing site for the evacuation of American airmen. Tito's associates condemned McDowell, demanding his withdrawal because they believed that he was giving political prestige to the Chetniks who did not deserve it. Churchill again personally intervened through Roosevelt, and McDowell was ordered to leave Mihailovic in September 1944.

=== Leaving Mihailović's headquarters ===
Despite his order to leave Chetnik headquarters, McDowell remained in Mihailovic's headquarters because American planes could not land on Chetnik controlled territory due to the weather conditions and increased armed conflict in the area. In October 1944, Tito personally engaged himself in connection with McDowell's negotiated surrender of German troops and warned Brigadier Fitzroy MacLean, the chief of the British mission to the Partisans, that the presence of McDowell and his team would certainly damage relations between the Partisans, Britain and the United States, claiming that McDowell had promised American support to Mihailović.

Some consider it possible that the Partisans forged a "captured" leaflet and showed it to Huntington at Tito's headquarters to provoke the recall of McDowell.

The British mission with Mihailović was recalled in December 1943. After McDowell left the Chetnik headquarters by plane on 23 November 1944 they remained without direct contact with the Allies during their retreat before the Partisan forces. Two members of the American mission (Nick Lalich and Arthur Jibilian) actually remained with the Chetnik headquarters after McDowell left it, and after unremitting efforts to sever even this last tie between Chetniks and Allies, they were ordered to retreat through Partisan-controlled territory. The last member of McDowell's team left the Chetniks on 11 December 1944.

== After World War II ==
In some works McDowell was described as a man of "violently pro-Chetnik prejudices".

In answer to congressional questions raised during a debate, about how much damage the Chetniks inflicted on the German war effort, McDowell claimed that all available evidence shows that German troops concentrated more on Chetniks rather than on Partisan-held territories because they held greater animosity and fear toward Mihailović than Tito. He also claimed that Chetniks had performed the most important sabotages against transport infrastructure of the Axis. Based on the official reports of other officers regarding the civil war in Yugoslavia and based on his own observations, McDowell concluded that "the principal concern of the Partisan leadership has been, not to destroy Germans, but Nationalists and Nationalism in Yugoslavia and the Balkans."

== Bibliography ==
After World War II, McDowell wrote a book titled The Key Role in Southeastern Europe during World War Two of the Serbs and Their Commander General Draza Mihailovich despite Their Abandonment by Churchill and Roosevelt. In 2015, this book was submitted to the court in Serbia as evidence during the process for rehabilitation of Mihailović.

== See also ==
- Dragoljub Mihailovich
- Dragutin Keserović
- Živko Topalović
- George Musulin
- Eli Popovich
- Arthur Jibilian
- John Milodragovich
- Michael Devyak
- Michael Rajacich
- Nick Lalich
- Joseph Veselinovich
- George S. Wuchinich
- Wayne S. Vucinich
- Michael Boro Petrovich
- Joe T. Milloy

== Sources ==
- Milazzo, Matteo J. (1 March 1975). The Chetnik movement & the Yugoslav resistance. Johns Hopkins University Press. ISBN 9780801815898.
- Lindsay, Franklin; Galbraith, John Kenneth (1995). Beacons in the Night: With the OSS and Tito's Partisans in Wartime Yugoslavia. Stanford University Press. ISBN 978-0-8047-2588-0.
- Redžić, Vučeta (2002). Građanski rat u Crnoj Gori: Dešavanja od sredine 1942. godine do sredine 1945. godine. Stupovi.
- Buchanan, Andrew (10 February 2014). American Grand Strategy in the Mediterranean during World War II. Cambridge University Press. ISBN 978-1-107-04414-2.
- Smith, Richard Harris (1 August 2005). OSS: The Secret History of America's First Central Intelligence Agency. Rowman & Littlefield. ISBN 978-1-59921-658-4.
- Chalou, George C. (December 1995). The Secret War: The Office of Strategic Services in World War II. DIANE Publishing. p. 202. ISBN 978-0-7881-2598-0.
- Leary, William Matthew (1995). Fueling the Fires of Resistance: Army Air Forces Special Operations in the Balkans During World War 2. Government Printing Office. ISBN 978-0-16-061364-7.
- Ford, Kirk (1992). OSS and the Yugoslav resistance, 1943-1945. Texas A&M University Press. ISBN 978-0-89096-517-7.
- O'Donnell, Patrick K. (2014). Operatives, Spies, and Saboteurs: The Unknown Story of the Men and Women of World War II's OSS. New York: Free Press. ISBN 9780743235747.
- Roberts, Walter R. (1987). Tito, Mihailović and the Allies: 1941–1945. New Brunswick, New Jersey: Duke University Press. ISBN 978-0-8223-0773-0.
- Tomasevich, Jozo (1975). War and Revolution in Yugoslavia, 1941–1945: The Chetniks. Stanford, California: Stanford University Press. ISBN 978-0-8047-0857-9.
