= Lalich =

Lalich is a surname, an anglicized form of Lalić. Notable people with the surname include:

- Janja Lalich (born 1945), American sociologist
- Judd Lalich (born 1975), Australian rules footballer
- Nick Lalich (1945–2025), Australian politician
- Nick Lalich (basketball) (1916–2001), Serbian American basketball player
- Pete Lalich (1920–2008), American basketball player
- Roger A. Lalich, American general
