= Lalić (surname) =

Lalić is a surname. Notable people with the surname include:

- Aleksandra Lalić, Serbian fashion designer
- Bogdan Lalić, Croatian chess grandmaster
- Dražen Lalić, Croatian sociologist
- Gojko Lalić, Serbian American chemistry professor
- Ivan V. Lalić, Serbian poet
- Luka Lalić, Serbian football coach
- Maja Vidaković Lalić, Serbian architect
- Maria Lalić, British artist
- Marin Lalić, Croatian football player
- Mihailo Lalić, novelist of Serbian and Montenegrin literature
- Nataša Lalić, Serbian politician
- Slobodan Lalić, Serbian football player
- Susan Lalic, British chess player
- Veljko Lalić, Serbian journalist, editor and publicist
- Vik Lalić, Croatian football player
- Žanamari Lalić, Croatian pop singer

== See also ==
- Lalich, anglicized version
