= Michael Rajacich =

American soldier (1913–1992)

Michael M. Rajacich
- Мајкл Рајачић
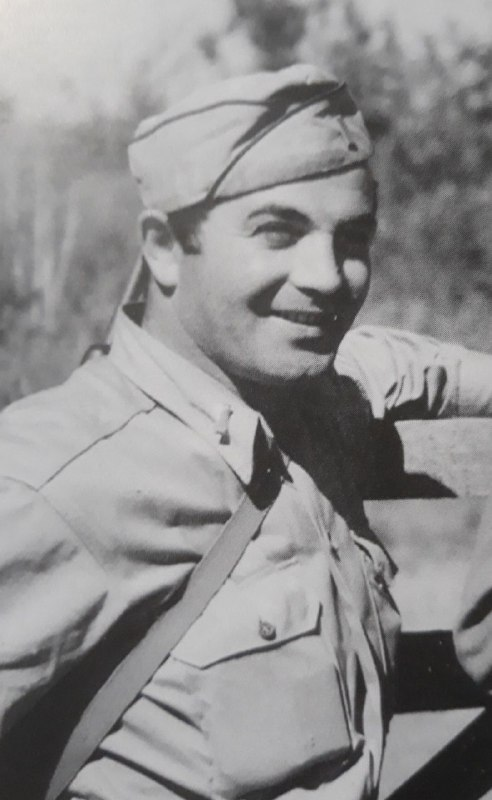
- Born: 26 October 1913; Hibbing, Minnesota, United States
- Died: 22 December 1992 (aged 79); Los Angeles, California, U.S.
- Burial place: Mountain View Memorial Park, Bastow, San Bernardino County, California
- Military career
- Allegiance: United States
- Branch: United States Army
- Service years: 1943–1944
- Rank: Sergeant (1943); Second Lieutenant (1944)
- Units: Office of Strategic Services (OSS); Fifteenth Air Force
- Conflicts: World War II; Operation Halyard
- Education: University of Belgrade
- Parents: Marko "Mike" Rajačić (father); Dora Kosovich (mother)

Michael M. Rajacich (Serbian: Мајкл Рајачић; 26 October 1913 — 22 December 1992) was an American second lieutenant. Born to a Serb family, he was a member of the Office of Strategic Services and a pivotal participant in Operation Halyard.

== Biography ==
=== Early life and education ===
Michael Rajacich's parents were from Lika, Serbia. His father, Marko "Mike" Rajačić (1880-1932), emigrated in 1896 to the United States and settled in Minnesota. He met Dora Kosovich (1888-1964), of Serbian Montenegrin roots, and they married. Rajacich was born in Hibbing, Minnesota. Whilst studying in Hibbing, Rajacich worked as a miner. He studied at the University of Belgrade from 1934 to 1938, supported by a scholarship funded by Serb emigrants.

From 1940, he worked for the United States Department of War.

=== World War II ===
Rajacich joined the U.S. Army on 22 July 1943. From the Office of Strategic Services (OSS), he was transferred to the 15th Air Corps under General Nathan Twining in Italy, where he joined Colonel Robert McDowell's "Ranger Group", which was tasked with organizing the rescue of United States Air Force personnel shot down over Yugoslavia.

At midnight 2 August 1944, Master Sargeant Michael Rajacich jumped out of a plane and parachuted into Pranjani, next to the headquarters of General Dragoljub Mihailovich, together with Lieutenant Colonel George Musulin, and radio operator Specialist Arthur Jibilian. The team was detailed to the United States Fifteenth Air Force and designated as the 1st Air Crew Rescue Unit. It was the largest rescue operation of American Airmen in history. Allied airmen who had been downed over occupied Yugoslavia were rescued by Mihailović's Chetniks, and airlifted out by the Fifteenth Air Force.

Together with Colonel Robert McDowell during the autumn of 1944, Rajacich trekked to Bosnia. He was evacuated on 1 November 1944 from the airport in Boljanić near Doboj, together with Colonel Robert McDowell.

== Later life and legacy ==
He died on 22 December 1992 in Los Angeles. He is buried at the Mountain View Memorial Park in Bastow, San Bernardino County, California, in the United States.

A film on the mission, Heroes of Halyard, directed by Radoš Bajić, was released in 2023 and is available on Tubi.

== See also ==
- List of American people of Serbian descent
