= Lalić =

Lalić may refer to:

- Lalić, Serbia, a village near Odžaci
- Lalić (surname)
