= Nedeljnik =

Serbian news magazine

- Front page of Nedeljnik on 13 March 2025
- Editor-in-chief: Veljko Lalic
- Categories: News magazine
- Frequency: Weekly
- Circulation: 30,000
- First issue: December 28, 2011; 13 years ago
- Company: NIP Nedeljnik
- Country: Serbia, Montenegro, Bosnia and Herzegovina, Macedonia, Slovenia, Croatia
- Based in: Belgrade, Serbia
- Language: Serbian
- Website: www.nedeljnik.rs

Nedeljnik (Serbian Cyrillic: Недељник) is a weekly news magazine published in Belgrade, Serbia.

Since October 2012 Nedeljnik has been published by an independent group of journalists, who are also the magazine's founders.

== Profile ==
The publishers of Nedeljnik consider its primary audience to be urban and educated people. There is a large interest for the interviews with the world leaders and influencers, which have been, for years, ignored in Serbia. Nedeljnik has published interviews with Lech Walesa, Noam Chomsky, Steve Forbes, Michael Bloomberg, Carla del Ponte, and Romano Prodi. It has also interviewed the most prominent Serbian politicians and intellectuals, and has published reports such as the in-depth interview with Boris Tadić and the first national interview of the then newly appointed President of Serbia, Tomislav Nikolić.

One of the most popular columns in the magazine is "Otvoreno" ("Open"), which invites intellectuals and politicians to write their views and commentaries.

Nedeljnik has published many interviews with influential people from Serbia and the region, as well as world-wide famous people, such as Noam Chomsky, Julian Assange, Toni Morrison, Francis Fukuyama, Khaled Hosseini, Morrissey., Yuval Noah Harari

One of the prominent interviews was with famous former NBA all-star Vlade Divac, in which declared he was leaving Serbia with a great deal of disappointment.

In December 2016, designer Mirko Ilić designed the newspaper's cover, accompanied by an interview.

Nedeljnik has also published interviews with many world-famous basketball players and coaches, including Željko Obradović, Dušan Ivković, Božidar Maljković, Igor Kokoškov, Predrag Danilović, Saša Đorđević, and Žarko Paspalj.

In 2017, Nedeljnik's reporter Dragan Krsnik uncovered the illegal practices of employing Serbian workers in the factories in Slovakia, with false employment contracts and no social security or health insurance.

In 2019, Belgrade-born artist Marina Abramović wrote a deeply personal letter to Serbia ahead of her retrospective.

In 2020, cover of Nedeljnik issue with US 2020 Presidential elections coverage was selected by Poynter among most illustrative covers from around the world. Cover features Donald Trump and Joe Biden, with Trump's message "You are fired", and Biden's reply "No, you are fired".

== Supplements ==
New York Times International Report, Serbian edition

Nedeljnik is the publisher of the first monthly publication of The New York Times International Report. Once a month it comes as a gift to readers of Nedeljnik. On 24 pages Nedeljnik presents the best current articles from The New York Times, including special pages dedicated to business, science, arts, politics, and lifestyle. Serbian language is only the third language in which an edition of The New York Times International is printed, after Spanish and Portuguese.

Since January 2018, the digital edition of The New York Times International Report has been available on Nedeljnik's website.

Original magazine

Nedeljnik created a magazine designed for young people and students, published with Novak Djokovic Foundation. The Original magazine was a concept to bring back young readers and to try to persuade them to read a quality mainstream magazine. This luxury glossy 96-page magazine is distributed to the students of Serbian universities, and the rest are distributed with some copies of Nedeljnik.

Le Monde diplomatique, Serbian edition

Cover of LMD in Serbian

Every third week in the month, readers of Nedeljnik get the Serbian edition of le Monde diplomatique for free. This most prestigious publication in the French-speaking world is written by philosophers, analysts and sociologists.

On the occasion of launching this edition, Noam Chomsky said: "I wish to congratulate Nedeljnik on starting the Serbian edition of Le Monde Diplomatique. It is, indeed, one of the few pillars of free thinking in today's world. Unique, invaluable, reliable, LMD is wonderful news for those who hope to understand the world or change it for the better."

== Awards ==
Veljko Lalic (editor-in-chief of Nedeljnik) is one of the most awarded Serbian journalists. He was the youngest winner of a journalist award, "Dimitrije Davidović" for editors (Dimitrije Davidovic is considered to be the pioneer of Serbian journalism) from the Journalists Association of Serbia, in 2015.

He also received the "Laza Kostic" for feuilleton in 2004, also as the youngest; gold medal "Misa Anastasijevic" in 2010 for the best manager from the Chamber of Commerce and Industry; "The man of the year" award for the best columnist in 2010, elected by all his colleagues and prominent persons; and "Dragisa Kasikovic" for his expending of freedom in 2015 and many other awards and recognitions.

In 2018 Lalic received the "Aleksandar Tijanic Award", a prominent award for bravery in journalistic expression. Lalic gave away the financial part of the award as a contribution to a journalist from a small town near Belgrade, who was attacked for his writing. The journalist, Milan Jovanović from Vrčin, had had his house burned down in an assault. Jovanović has reported on the "suddenly acquired property" of the head of the local Grocka municipality, as well as alleging corruption in the construction of sewage systems, after which local authorities cut down his water supply. The president of Grocka municipality and official of ruling was arrested, suspected for ordering an arson attack on Jovanović's house.

The website Nedeljnik.rs was named as one of the top five best news web sites in the country for 2017 in a ranking conducted by the magazine PCPRESS.

In 2017, Dragan Krsnik won the award for investigative reportage.

In 2017, the Queen of the United Kingdom decorated Branko Rosić, managing editor of Nedeljnik, with a Medal of The British Empire, for his lifetime contribution in creating cultural ties between the two countries.

In 2017, Nenad Čaluković, political editor of Nedeljnik, won an award for the interview of the year.

IN 2016, Marko Prelević, managing editor of Nedeljnik, won an award for columnist of the year.

In 2015, Veljko Lalić, editor in chief of Nedeljnik, won an award for best editor in the country from the national association of journalists (Journalists Association of Serbia).

== Investigative journalism ==
In February 2017, Nedeljnik published a story written by Dragan Krsnik, the undercover reporter who spent several months working at a Samsung factory in Galanta, Slovakia, without a proper working permit. In the report, Krsnik described slave-like conditions and woeful wages for hundreds of Serbian and other foreign workers in the plants in Slovakia. The report spawned an immediate reaction from Serbian and Slovak public and the governments of Slovakia and Serbia.

A few days after the report was published, the Labour Ministry of Slovakia announced it would pay more attention to companies with foreign staff. "The Labour Ministry wants to see foreigners working in Slovakia only legally and in conditions corresponding to the Slovak Labour Code", the minister Richter said. "We've found out - and this was also confirmed by Hungarian authorities - that several Serbian nationals working in Slovakia were deceived and were staying here illegally, although they themselves didn't know that", he added.

In June 2017, the Serbian minister of Labor, Employment, Veteran and Social Affairs visited Bratislava, Slovakia and spoke about the ways for joint action in cases of unlawful treatment of workers coming from the third countries.

In November 2017, Serbia and Slovakia signed a protocol on cooperation between in the field of labor and employment, the Serbian government announced.

In February 2018, the Slovak parliament approved a draft amendment to the law on employment services that simplifies the conditions for employing people from the non-EU countries.

Krsnik and Nedeljnik were featured in numerous media outlets throughout Europe. The report was featured in Le Monde diplomatique, among others.

Krsnik's report won the Association of Journalists of Serbia's award for reportage in December 2017.

In August 2019, Nedeljnik discovered that Serbia had granted citizenship to Thailand's fugitive former premier Yingluck Shinawatra, who was ousted ahead of the 2014 coup.

== Special editions ==
Person of the Year

Nedeljnik introduced the annual "Person of the Year" cover story in December 2016. The first "Person of the Year" selected was president of Serbian Academy of Science and Arts Vladimir Kostić. The next year, famous basketball coach Dušan Duda Ivković was featured as "Person of the Year". It was his last year as active basketball coach, and because of political connotations his last game was organized in Greece, rather than Serbia.

== Website ==
The Internet edition of Nedeljnik is one of the most popular websites among highly educated and high income readers in Serbia, according to Gemius agency. The website Nedeljnik.rs has been selected as one of the top five news sites in Serbia in most respective yearly selections of its kind, conducted by Serbia's renowned PC magazine.

== Air Serbia business lounge case ==
Nedeljnik was one of the political news magazines Air Serbia Airport Lounge staff were instructed not to display. Staff were directed by a supervisor to remove all newspapers and magazines left behind by travelers. "Pay special attention to NIN, Vreme and Nedeljnik weeklies and newspapers of similar content. They should not be exhibited," the memo to staff said. This action was seen as controversial in Serbia, and reactions of European officials followed. Opposition politicians in Serbia used this case to illustrate the censorship in Serbia.

== Journalist surveillance case ==
In February 2020 Serbia's Defence Minister Aleksandar Vulin commented on an article in Nedeljnik that had never been published by the newspaper, or anyone else.

Author of the opinion piece in question was opposition politician Dragan Sutanovac, who asked the editor-in-chief Veljko Lalic if Nedeljnik would publish his column in a part of the weekly where public figures express their views.

"Sutanovac sent the column on Monday, and Lalic told him on Tuesday afternoon that the weekly wouldn't publish it. It hasn't been either published in the print issue nor has it been posted on the website. It remained in Sutanovac's and Lalic's e-mails and in the correspondence with the other editor Marko Prelevic whom Lalic sent the article. After that, Sutanovac said he would offer the article to other media. And that will be all as far as we are concerned," Nedeljnik said in the statement.

Later, the Defence Ministry apologised, blaming its PR, which said the article was published by Nedeljnik instead of the Kurir tabloid. Nevertheless, it added, "all the Minister said was true."

Sutanovac said that in interview for Kurir he didn't say anything regarding the issues Vulin commented in his statement, so it was obvious that article in Nedeljnik he had in mind.

"The debate with the unpublished article undoubtedly confirms that Vulin has illegally obtained the e-mails exchange between the Nedeljnik's editor and me. Is Serbia becoming the country of 'Big Brother' in which the state resources are used to intercept the communication between the former Defence Minister and media editor, is now doubtless."

Reporters Without Borders (RSF) urged the Serbian authorities to investigate the possibility that the government had spied on and intercepted emails between an opposition politician and Nedeljnik.

== COVID-19 coverage ==
Nedeljnik magazine, doctor superheroes

During the coronavirus crisis in early spring of 2020, Nedeljnik published a series of special issues on global and local influence of the new pandemic. Most influential thinkers and opinion makers, global and domestic, presented their prospective of a new world after the pandemic. Among others, such influential thinkers as Francis Fukuyama and Yuval Noah Harari gave interviews for Nedeljnik.

One of the Nedeljnik covers during the pandemic drew particular attention. It presented the faces of doctors imprinted with the masks of superheroes. It was part of a campaign by the McCann agency. On this occasion McCann World Group referred to Nedeljnik as the "Serbian equivalent of Time magazine".

== Circulation ==
According to IPSOS agency, the readership of Nedeljnik is around 100,000, while according to agency Partner, Nedeljnik is the only political magazine among the weeklies with the highest circulation, with an average readership close to 80,000.

The research of Ipsos Strategic Marketing shows that more than 70 percent of readers of Nedeljnik are highly educated, and they are the opinion makers, political and business elite of this country.

According to the recent report by the Serbian government’s Commission for Protection of Competition, Nedeljnik controls between 30 and 40 percent of the current affairs magazines market, which includes more than 20 publications
