= George Vujnovich =

American intelligence officer known for Operation Halyard

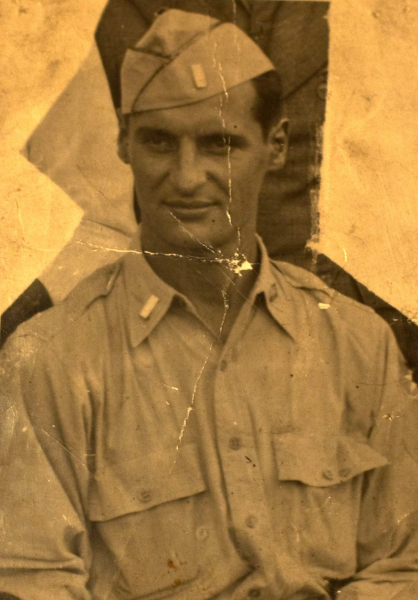
- Vujnovich in uniform
- Born: George Mane Vujnovich; May 31, 1915; Pittsburgh, Pennsylvania, U.S.
- Died: April 24, 2012 (aged 96); Jackson Heights, Queens, New York City, New York
- Burial place: Arlington National Cemetery
- Education: University of Belgrade
- Spouse: Mirjana Lazich (m. 1939–2003)
- Children: 1
- Military career
- Allegiance: United States
- Branch: U.S. Army
- Rank: Major
- Unit: Office of Strategic Services
- Known for: Operation Halyard
- Conflicts: World War II
- Awards: Bronze Star Medal (2010)
- Other work: Aircraft parts sales

George Mane Vujnovich (May 31, 1915 – April 24, 2012) was an American intelligence officer for the Office of Strategic Services during World War II. He is known for his role in the organization of Operation Halyard, a successful operation that evacuated over 500 downed Allied airmen from Serbia.

== Early life ==
Vujnovich was born in Pittsburgh, Pennsylvania to two Serbian immigrants. After completing high school he attended the University of Belgrade in Yugoslavia. While there he met his wife Mirjana Lazich and they married in 1939. In 1941 he witnessed the bombing of Belgrade by Nazi Germany prompting him and Mirjana to flee to Budapest, Hungary. From there they continued fleeing to Turkey then to Jerusalem then finally to Cairo. When they arrived there it was not long before the Nazi Afrika Korps led by Erwin Rommel began to push into Egypt. While in Cairo, he landed a job with Pan American Airways who then relocated him and his wife to Ghana to a U.S.-controlled air base.

== Military career ==
While in Ghana, the US entered the war and militarized the commercial airline company. At that point, he was commissioned into the US Army and subsequently transferred to another U.S.-controlled air base in Nigeria where he was made base commander. The Army recognized his Serbian background and experience in Yugoslavia and recruited him to assist the resistance efforts in the Balkans. He completed training in Virginia and was stationed in Bari, Italy.

In the summer of 1944, US bombers attempted to take out Nazi oil fields in Romania but many were shot down over Yugoslavia. Vujnovich then came up with Operation Halyard, a plan to get U.S. service personnel out of Yugoslavia by building a secret airfield. He trained Serbian speaking agents to blend in by showing them small things such as tying their shoes the Serbian way among other things, in order to conduct this operation. The agents parachuted in and over 500 airmen were rescued with the help of Gen. Draža Mihailović and his Chetniks forces, composed of unsurrendered members of the Royal Yugoslav Army, Navy, and Air Force.

== Post-war ==
After the war, Vujnovich and his wife settled in New York City where they had a daughter. Shortly after moving, he began a new career selling aircraft parts until he retired in the 1980s. He continued consulting in the field well into his 90s.

In 2010, Vujnovich was awarded the Bronze Star for his role in the operation.

In 2012, Vujnovich died at the age of 96. He is buried in the Arlington National Cemetery. He was active in the Serbian Orthodox Church, and served as board president of the Serbian Orthodox Cathedral of Saint Sava in Manhattan.

== See also ==
- Operation Halyard
