= Operation Halyard =

1944 Allied airlift operation in Serbia

Halyard Mission
- Part of World War II in Yugoslavia
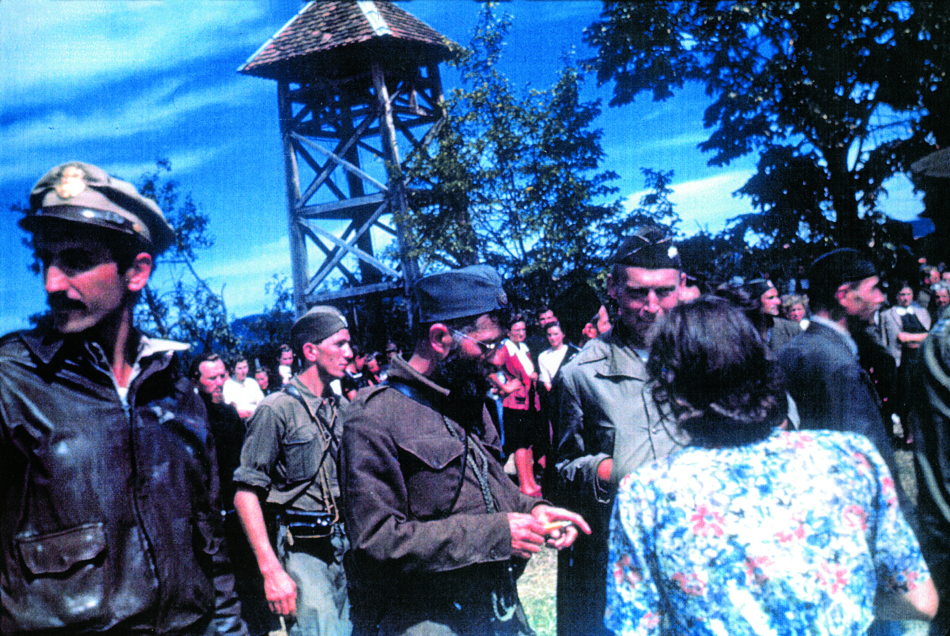
- Joint US/Chetnik military ceremony in Pranjani September 6, 1944: Capt. Nick Lalich (OSS), Gen. Dragoljub Mihailović (Yugoslav Army in the Homeland), and Col. Robert H. McDowell (OSS).
- Type: Airlift/Special operation
- Location: Near Pranjani, Serbia; 44°02′09″N 20°10′41″E
- Commanded by: Maj. Gen. William J. Donovan; Gen. Nathan Farragut Twining; Lt. Gen. Ira C. Eaker; Gen. Dragoljub Mihailovic
- Objective: Rescue of U.S airmen
- Date: 2 August – 27 December 1944
- Executed by: Office of Strategic Services Chetniks Mediterranean Allied Air Forces
- Outcome: Mission success
- Location within Yugoslavia

Operation Halyard (or Halyard Mission), known in Serbian as Operation Air Bridge (Serbian: Операција Ваздушни мост, romanized: Operacija Vazdušni most), was an Allied airlift operation behind Axis lines during World War II. In July 1944, the Office of Strategic Services (OSS) drew up plans to send a team to the Chetniks force led by General Draža Mihailović in the German-occupied Territory of the Military Commander in Serbia for the purpose of evacuating Allied airmen shot down over that area. This team, known as the Halyard team, was commanded by Lieutenant George Musulin, along with Master Sergeant Michael Rajacich, and Specialist Arthur Jibilian, the radio operator. The team was detailed to the United States Fifteenth Air Force and designated as the 1st Air Crew Rescue Unit. It was the largest rescue operation of American airmen in history.

Historian Jozo Tomasevich cites a report submitted to the OSS stating that 417 Allied airmen who had been downed over occupied Yugoslavia were rescued by Mihailović's Chetniks and airlifted out by the Fifteenth Air Force. Lieutenant Commander Richard M. Kelly (OSS) gives a total of 432 U.S. and 80 Allied personnel airlifted during the Halyard Mission. Historian Robert J. Donia places the number of Allied airmen rescued from Chetnik-controlled territory at between 500 and 600.

== Background ==
=== Targets for bombing ===
John A. Kingsbury at banquet given by peasants, who are thankful for the health center, at village Pranjani in 1920.

After the successful Allied invasion of Sicily, Italy capitulated in the autumn of 1943, and the Allies occupied the whole of southern Italy. In late 1943, the 15th Air Force of the United States Army Air Forces, under the command of General Nathan Twining, was transferred from Tunisia to an airfield near Foggia. This airfield became the largest American air base in southern Italy, and was used for attacking targets in southern and eastern Europe. The 15th Army Air Force also used the nearby airfields of Bari, Brindisi, Lecce and Manduria.

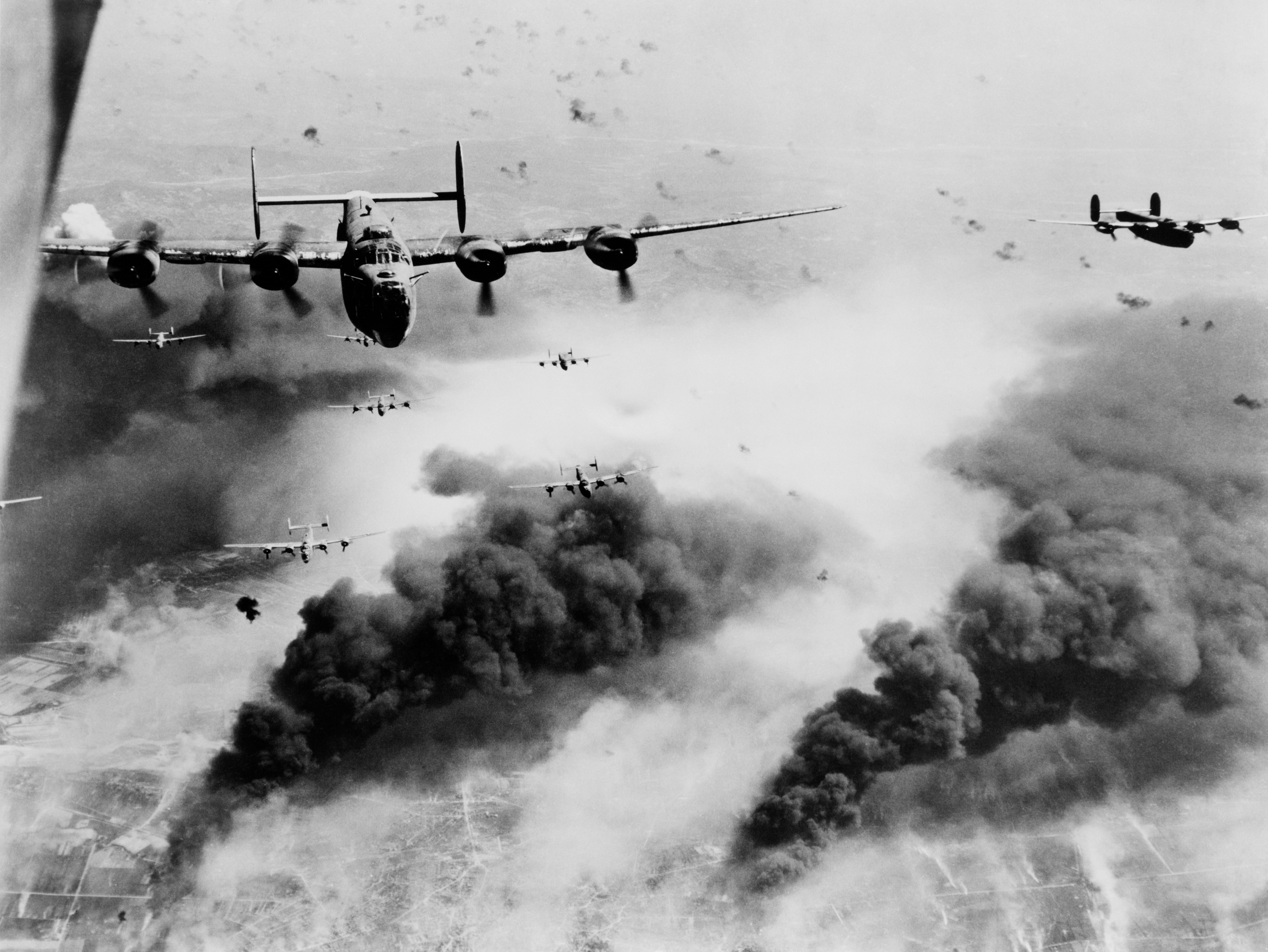
B-24D's fly over Ploiești during World War II

The 15th Air Force bombed targets in Germany, Hungary, Slovakia, the Independent State of Croatia, the Territory of the Military Commander in Serbia, Bulgaria and Romania. Some of the most important targets were sources of petroleum and petroleum refineries in Romania. These installations were vital to Hitler's war machine and the main targets in the Oil Campaign of World War II. The Astra Română refinery in Ploiești alone provided one quarter of the Third Reich's fuel needs and was one of the priority targets. All flights targeting the oilfields and refineries in Romania, near the town of Ploiești north of Bucharest, passed over the Territory of the Military Commander in Serbia.

=== Flight path ===
From October 1943 to October 1944, the 15th Air Force conducted about 20,000 sorties with fighters and bombers. During this time, it lost almost fifty percent of its aircraft but only about ten percent of its personnel. It had at its disposal 500 heavy bombers (B-17 Flying Fortresses and B-24 Liberators) and about 100 fighter escorts.

The flight path from southern Italy to the targets in Romania was repeatedly used every day from the spring of 1944 (over the Adriatic Sea, Montenegro, Serbia and Bulgaria to Romania). Two-thirds of these flights were carried out against objectives in Bulgaria, Romania and the German-occupied zone of Serbia. The Germans had at their disposal a limited number of fighter aircraft whose most frequent targets were Allied planes that had already been damaged by Axis anti-aircraft defenses in Bulgaria and Romania, planes that because of such damage had to fly slowly at low altitude.

In the spring of 1944, the 15th Air Force intensified the bombing of targets in Bulgaria and Romania, resulting in American aviators being forced to bail out of damaged aircraft over Yugoslavia in increasing numbers. Some crews fell into the hands of Romanian, Bulgarian, Croatian or German troops and were sent to prisoner of war camps. By August 1944, 350 bombers had been lost. Many of the crews survived: some came down in territory held by Marshal Tito's Partisans, while others found refuge in Serbia with Draža Mihailović`s Chetniks.

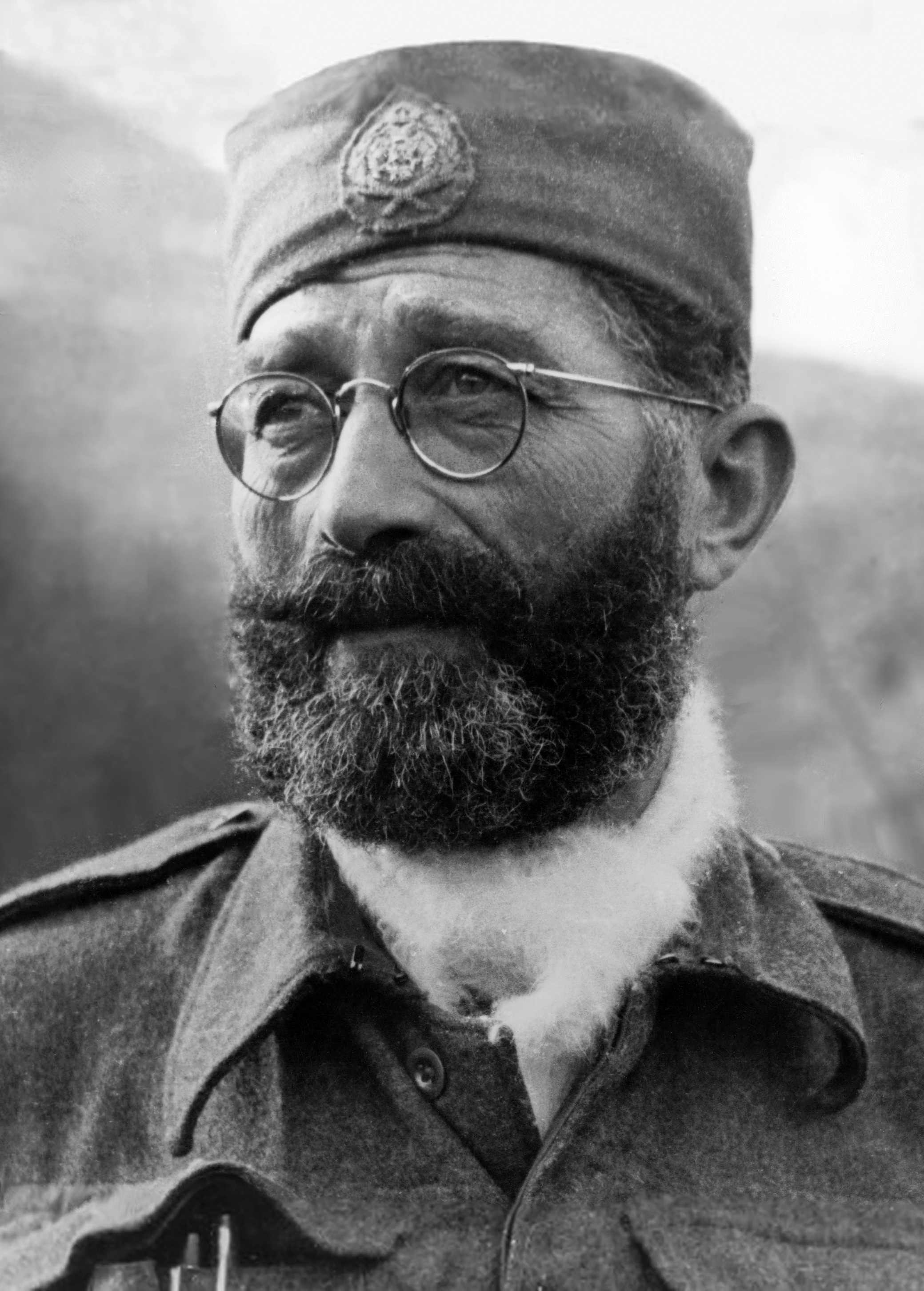
Draža Mihailović in 1943

The first American airmen bailed out over the German-occupied zone of Serbia on 24 January 1944. That day two Liberators were shot down, one of them over Zlatibor, the other over Toplica. One bomber, damaged by German fighter planes, made an emergency landing between Pločnik and Beloljin. A crew of nine were rescued by the Chetnik Toplica Corps under the command of Major Milan Stojanović. The crew were placed in the home of local Chetnik leaders in the village of Velika Draguša. Another bomber was shot down that same day, the crew bailing out over Mount Zlatibor. They were found by members of the Zlatibor Corps. A radiogram message about the rescue of one of the crews was sent by Stojanović to Mihailović on 25 January. Major Stojanović wrote that the previous day about 100 bombers flew from the direction of Niš towards Kosovska Mitrovica, and that they were followed by nine German fighter aircraft. After a half-hour battle, one plane caught fire and was forced to land between the villages of Pločnik and Beloljin, in the Toplica River valley.

By early July 1944, over one hundred airmen were in areas under Chetnik control. The German and Bulgarian occupation forces in Serbia that had spotted the damaged aircraft and open parachutes pursued the airmen. However, Chetniks under Mihailović had already reached them. The Germans offered cash for the capture of Allied airmen. However, peasants accepted the airmen into their homes and fed them for months without Allied help. Hospitals for sick and wounded airmen were established in Pranjani village.

== Creation of the Air Crew Rescue Unit ==
Office of Strategic Services officers already had secured Marshal Tito's cooperation in retrieving downed airmen. In January 1944 Major Linn M. Farish and Lieutenant Eli Popovich had parachuted into Partisan HQ at Drvar to arrange assistance in rescuing American flyers. Following a meeting with Tito on 23 January 1944, orders went out to all Partisan units to do everything possible to locate downed airmen and conduct them safely to the nearest Allied liaison team.

Efforts to retrieve aircrews from Chetnik-controlled areas ran afoul of the tangled web of Balkan politics. The British, who considered that part of the world within their sphere of interest, had shifted their support to Tito and were determined to sever all ties with Mihailović lest they offend the Communist leader. American attempts to maintain contact with Mihailović had been rebuffed by London. Nonetheless, General Nathan F. Twining, commander of the 15th Air Force, was determined to rescue his downed airmen. On 24 July 1944, thanks to the efforts of Twining and several OSS officers, General Ira C. Eaker directed the 15th Air Force to establish an Air Crew Rescue Unit (ACRU). This independent organization of the Mediterranean Allied Air Forces, attached to the 15th Air Force, would be responsible for locating and evacuating Allied airmen throughout the Balkans.

Selected to head the ACRU was Colonel George Kraigher of the AAF Transport Command. Kraigher had flown for the Royal Serbian Air Force in World War I. Prior to World War II, Kraigher had played a key role in developing a Pan American Airways air route from Miami to the Middle East via Brazil and West Africa. Taking over the rescue unit, Kraigher formed two parties. One would work with Tito's Partisans, the other with Mihailović's Chetniks.

Lieutenant George Musulin, an OSS officer who had led a liaison mission to Mihailović and one of the foremost advocates of maintaining contact with the Chetniks, was named commander of ACRU 1 (known as the Halyard Mission). Musulin, as Lieutenant Nelson Deranian, chief of OSS Special Operations Branch (SO) Bari suggested, possessed "the rugged character required to meet the hardships involved". Master Sergeant Michael Rajacich, borrowed from OSS Secret Intelligence Branch (S1) for this particular assignment, and Navy Specialist 1st Class Arthur Jibilian, the mission's OSS radio operator, rounded out Musulin's team.

== Rescue of American airmen ==
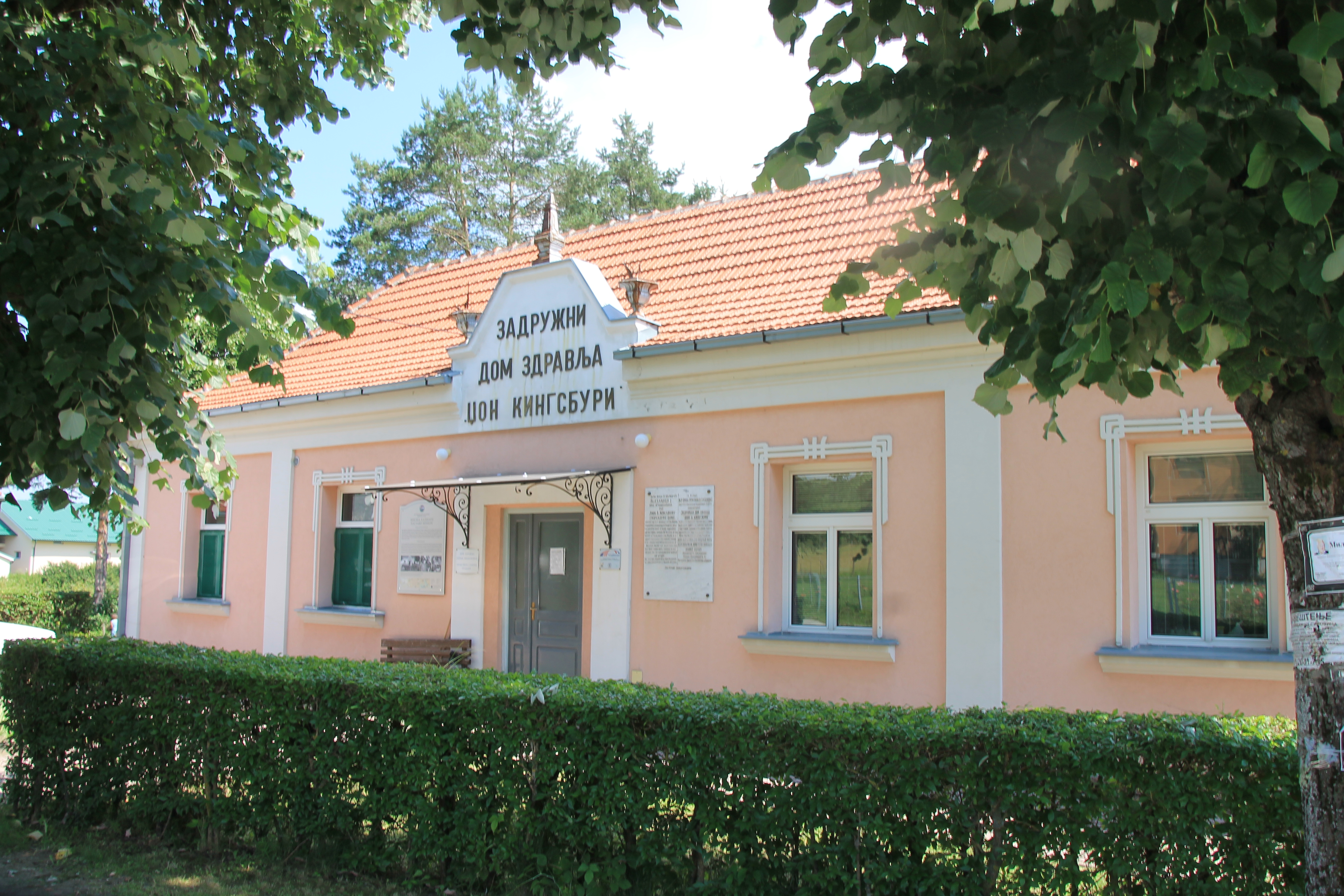
Health center in the village of Pranjani, built as an endowment of social worker, humanist and member of the US Red Cross John A. Kingsbury (1876-1956) after the First World War. In 1944, the OSS-led Halyard Mission team gave partial help from limited supplies. The dispensary was transformed into an American military field hospital behind enemy lines to treat wounded American airmen, Serbian Chetniks and local inhabitants.

On the night of 2–3 August 1944, after several abortive attempts, the Halyard Mission team parachuted into Mihailović's headquarters at Pranjani.

Airman Richard Felman (415th Bombardment Squadron, 98th Bombardment Group, 15th Air Force), who was at Pranjani, recalls the scene when the mission arrived at the airfield:

The one who was in the lead was the of [sic] a mob of Chetniks—they were kissing him and cheering him with tears in their eyes. He was in an American uniform and was one of the biggest chaps I'd ever seen. He walked over to us and put out his hands. 'I'm George Musulin', he said.

Musulin arranged a meeting with a committee of the airmen to discuss the preparations that would need to be made before evacuation could take place. He discovered that there were approximately 250 airmen divided into six groups and housed within a ten-mile radius of the airstrip at Galovića polje (Galovica field) near Pranjani. Musulin established a courier service between the mission and the various groups in order to provide daily news on the progress being made. He also distributed funds to enable the airmen to purchase needed supplies. At the same time, Mihailović assigned the First Ravna Gora Corps to provide security for the operation.

According to Professor Kirk Ford, the airmen assembled at Pranjani awaiting evacuation represented a potential source of intelligence, particularly concerning Serbia:

They had witnessed the civil war between Chetnik and Partisan forces and had experienced the full range of Chetnik-German relations, from open hostility to wary tolerance and at times accommodation. They had seen Chetnik soldiers give their lives to save them from capture and had been protected and well-treated by Mihailović's forces and by the Serbian peasantry. Their very presence at Pranjani under Chetnik was itself a clear evidence that Mihailović remained a well-disposed toward the United States and was no collaborator in the true sense of the word.

To some, it may be difficult to understand how the Chetniks could rescue American Airmen from the Germans, as they did in at least one instance, and, at the same time, collaborate with these very same forces. The answer rests in the Chetniks' perception of who was really the enemy. The Chetniks considered the Partisan communist movement a far greater threat to Yugoslavia than the German occupation forces. Renewed Allied support was Mihailovic's only means of reversing the Partisan takeover. There was absolutely nothing to be gained by turning American airmen over to the Germans. In fact, evacuated Americans were a significant source of first rate public relations on behalf of the Chetniks. In late 1944, only Americans displayed any outward concern for what might happen to the Chetniks when the Partisans gained control. To do anything except rescue and protect American airmen would mean the loss of their last source of support and salvation.

According to statistics compiled by the US Air Force Air Crew Rescue Unit, between 1 January and 15 October 1944, a total of 1,152 American airmen were airlifted from Yugoslavia, 795 with the assistance of the Yugoslav Partisans and 356 with the help of the Serbian Chetniks. Serbian-American Lieutenant Eli Popovich, part of the Halyard Mission attached to Partisan HQ, kept in radio contact with Arthur Jibilian to co-ordinate the rescue of all American and foreign airmen in Yugoslavia from Mihailović's HQ (where radio operator Jibilian was attached).

== Airstrip construction ==
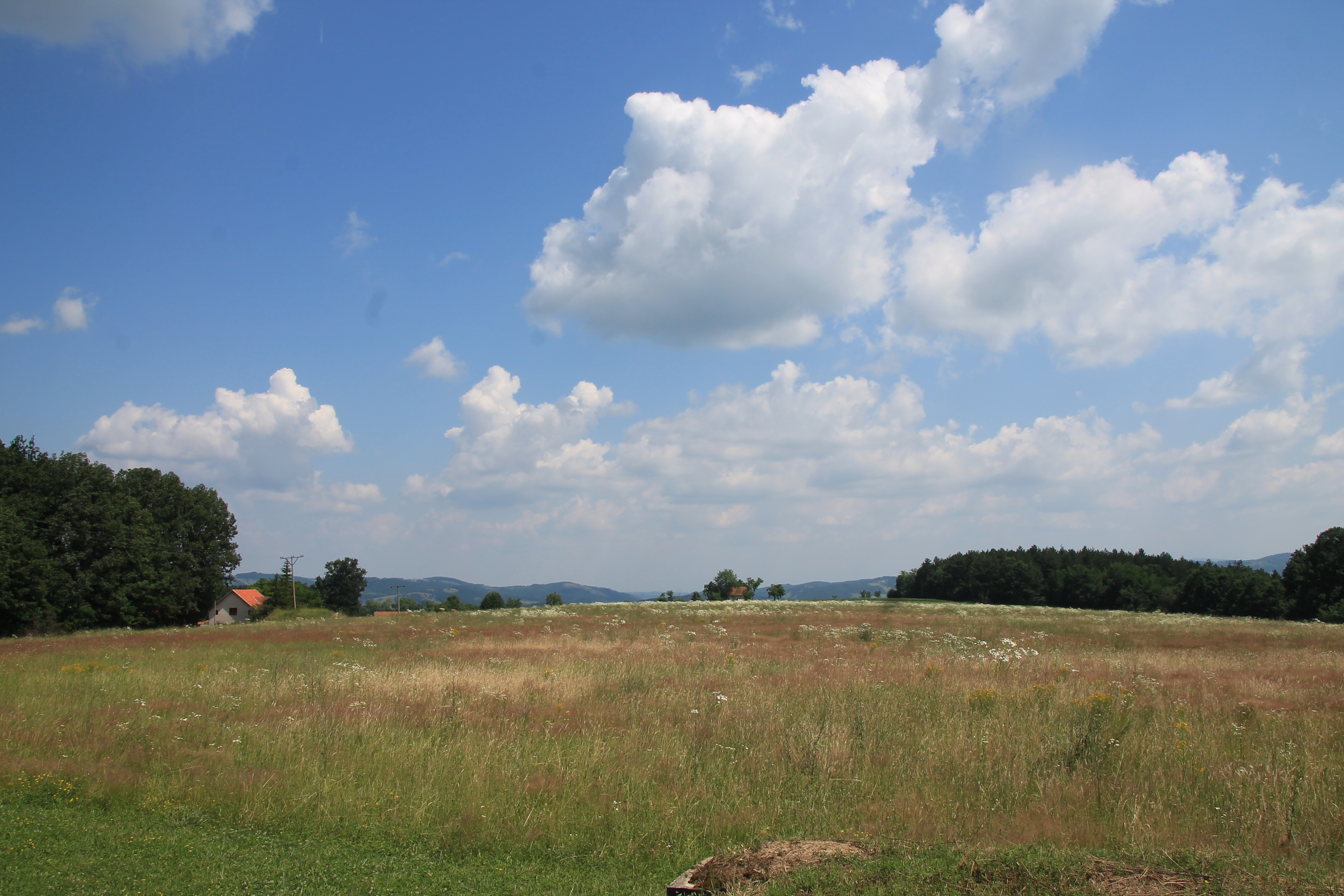
Improvised airfield in the village of Pranjani. On this site, in 2020 construction was started on the Memorial Complex and the sport airfield to commemorate the rescue operation.

In early-March 1944, 25 rescued pilots were brought to Pranjani. Captain Zvonimir Vučković of the First Ravna Gora Corps was responsible for their security. Mihailović ordered Vučković to build an improvised airstrip from which the aviators could be evacuated. Vučković selected a field near Pranjani. Construction of the airstrip was managed by Captain Nikola Verkić. Vučković stated:

More than a hundred diggers and as many ox-drawn carts were used to build. Because of the greater secrecy we worked mostly at night. The digging, leveling and cutting-down of trees created blisters on hands. In late March I sent a report to General Mihailović that the jobs around the airport were completed.

British authorities thought the airstrip was too short. Eleven airmen, including John P. Devlin, wanted to go on foot to the Adriatic Sea. Mihailovic provided supporting units and they started out on 19 April, after a ceremonial send-off in Pranjani. The remaining aviators were unable to walk due to injuries and illness. A few dozen more airmen reached Pranjani in late April. Vučković divided them into two groups. The first, from the Takovo district, was guided by Sergeant Bora Komračević. The second group, from the Dragačevo district, was guided by Mihailo Paunović, who did not speak English.

== Ground combat ==
Due to the concentration of rescued aviators near Pranjani, fighting occurred between the Chetniks and German and Bulgarian occupation forces. On 14 March 1944 the Germans moved into the village of Oplanić, near Gružа, looking for the crew of a downed Liberator. Captain Nikola Petković's 4th Battalion of the Gruža Brigade opened fire on German armored vehicles to lure them away from the portion of the village where the aviators were hiding. Three Chetniks were killed and two more captured during the firefight. After the war, the communists destroyed their gravestones.

The 1st Dragačevo Brigade of the First Ravna Gora Corps engaged German forces attempting to capture an American aircrew bailing out over the Čačak - Užice road. Vučković reported the deaths of a few Chetnik soldiers in the fight. The fallen Chetniks were buried in a cemetery in Dljin village.

Lieutenant Colonel Todor Gogić, commander of the Morava group Corps sent a radiogram to Mihailović on 17 April:

On 15 April at about 11 hours, due to engine failure, a B-24 Liberator with a crew of 10 made an emergency landing near the village of Drenovac south of Paraćin. We managed to rescue nine crew members from the Germans and Bulgarians, but one airmen was captured. The crew is from the 861st Squadron, 460th bomber group.

The crew was the Frank T. Sutton, III crew flying B-24 bomber serial no. 42-78186 named "Lucky Strike".

== Departure of the Chetnik political mission ==
The British SOE military mission led by Brigadier Charles Armstrong was ready for evacuation by late May 1944. Following agreement with their Bari headquarters, three Douglas Dakota cargo aircraft (C-47s) landed at Pranjani on 29 May. In addition to the SOE mission, 40 rescued Allied airmen were also evacuated. Mihailović had decided to send a political mission to London using the same evacuation. The mission was led by the President of the Socialist Party of Yugoslavia, Živko Topalović who had represented Yugoslavia in the Labour and Socialist International executive. He intended to meet with British political leaders to influence them to change Winston Churchill's decision to abandon Mihailović and support Josip Broz Tito. Topalović's mission was a failure. The British did not allow him to leave southern Italy.

== Radio link ==
=== The Democratic Yugoslavia news agency bulletin reports ===
Reports about the rescued airmen were sent to the Democratic Yugoslavia news agency, which belonged to the High Command of the Yugoslav Army in the fatherland of Mihailović. This agency had an office and radio station in New York City. A report was received by the Yugoslav Embassy in Washington, DC. Staff headed by the Ambassador Konstantin Fotić, forwarded the report to the US Army so that the families of airmen could be informed, especially their mothers, who had in some cases been notified that their offspring were "missing in action". The reports almost always contained the names and addresses of the airmen.

Mirjana Vujnovich was working at the Yugoslav Embassy in Washington when she learned of reports that Serbian guerrillas were sheltering Allied airmen. She passed the information on to her husband, George Vujnovich, who put together a rescue plan. Lieutenant George Vujnovich, worked for the OSS in Brindisi, in southern Italy. He received a letter from his wife which mentioned the American airmen's plight: "there are hundreds... can you do something for them? It would be great if [they] are evacuated". It was the turning point which led to the planning and execution of Operation Halyard.

=== Evacuation ===
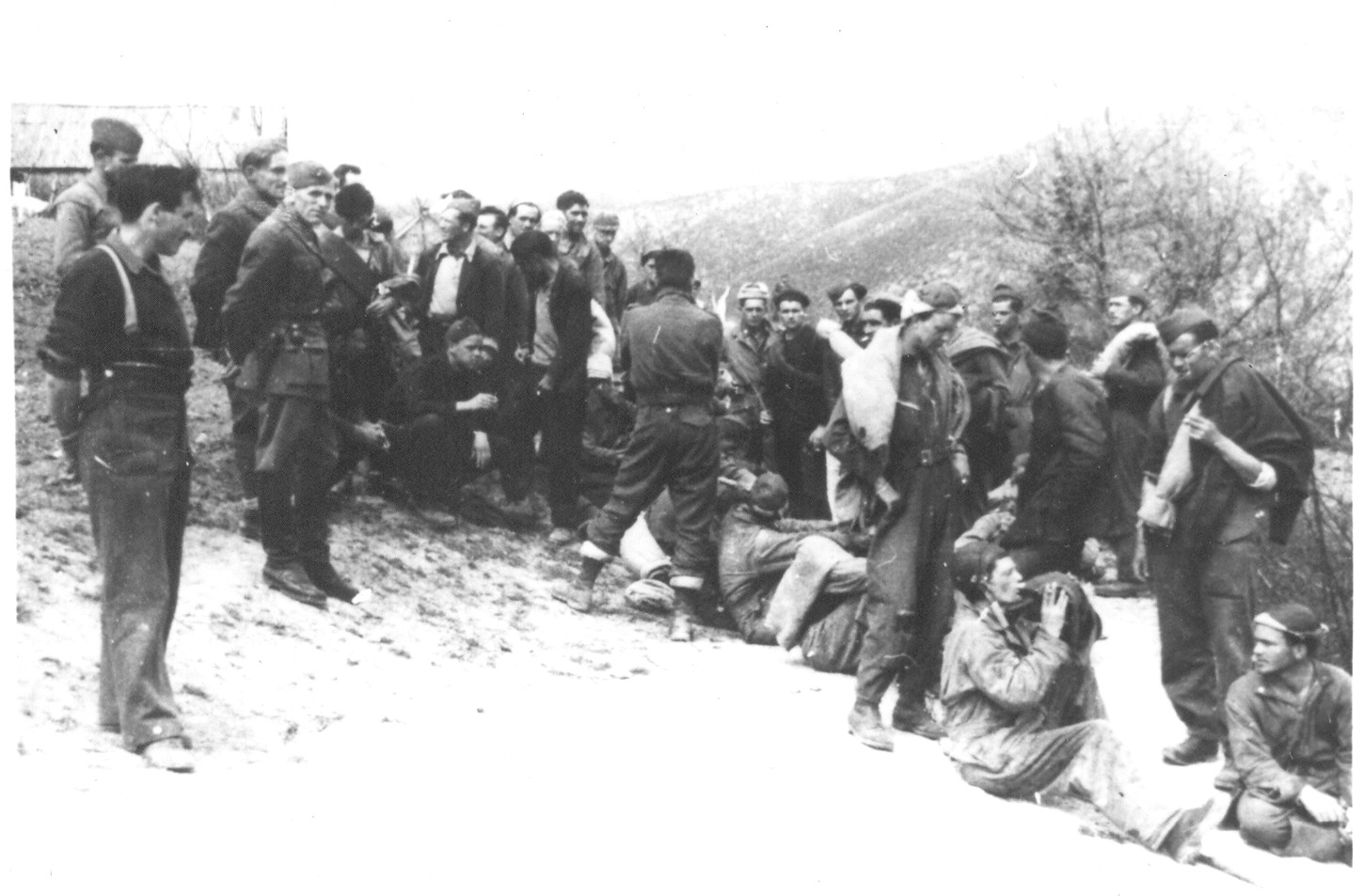
Rescue of Allied airmen by Yugoslav Partisans, Drvar 1943

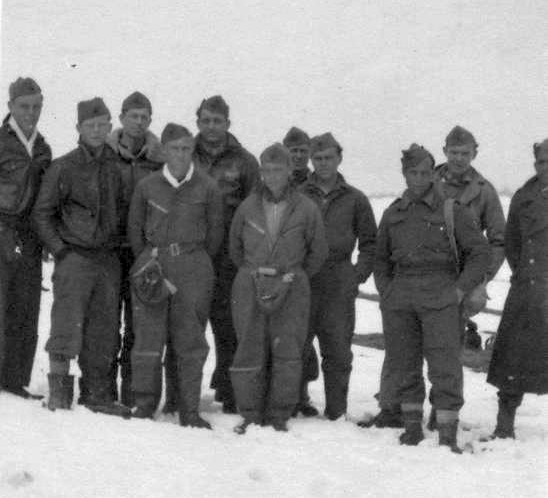
Rescue of Allied airmen by Yugoslav Partisans, Otočac 1943

In late-May 1944, for the first time since 1941, there were no Allied liaison officers with the Chetniks. Mihailovich's headquarters had attempted to establish direct radio contact with the Allied Mediterranean Command, but failed.

On 15 July 1944, while returning in a severely damaged airplane (B-17G, 840th BS, 483rd BG, 15th AF, Sterparone, Italy) on a mission to an important enemy oil refinery in Ploiești, Captain Leo C. Brooks was forced to bail out over Yugoslavia (Ljig, Serbia). Immediately on landing, he was approached by members of the Chetnik army who offered him assistance. At Captain Brooks' request to see their commanding officer (Kapetan Marko Muzikravić), he was led through the mountains for several days. On 26 July 1944, he reached a British landing strip in Pranjani, Serbia, that had been prepared for the evacuation of escapees.

In the villages surrounding this field, there were already some 150 American airmen who were awaiting an expected evacuation, and more were coming in every day. As the ranking American officer, he took command of the Americans present. In conjunction with the Chetnik area commander, he determined the best policy to follow in quartering and protecting the men and in effecting a high degree of camouflage discipline. Due to his careful planning, tact, and diplomacy, Captain Brooks obtained maximum aid and assistance from the Chetniks. Two entire army corps, totaling 3,000 men, were provided him to insure ample defense against possible German interference.

At Captain Brooks' suggestion, all men to be evacuated were split into six groups with an American officer in charge of each. The first of these groups was composed of all the sick and injured who were quartered near a hospital so that they could receive medical attention. The rest of the groups were dispersed in the neighboring mountains, the most distant being two hours walking distance away. Keeping with him a staff of six officers to handle staff work, Captain Brooks then directed that, to insure the most orderly and expeditious evacuation possible, a list be drafted by name, rank, and serial number of all Americans in the area together with the date of their being shot down. Meanwhile, two men who had been sent to contact General Mihailovic's headquarters, brought back word that on one of three specified nights friendly planes would land to evacuate those present.

Captain Brooks inspected the airfield, improvised a night-lighting system with several kerosene lamps and then set up a watch to signal the planes when they came over. Only one plane arrived, however, and it did not land, dropping supplies and three men by parachute instead. These three men (OSS team, 1st Lieutenant Musulin, Master Sergeant Rajacich, and Navy Petty Officer Jibilian) had been sent in as an Allied mission from Italy and had brought along a radio. The officer in charge of the mission brought word that the landing strip was not considered usable by the 15th Air Force and that no landing would be made until a great amount of work had been done to it. After setting up an improvised radio station with the new equipment, Captain Brooks left one officer in charge of the construction work necessary at this particular field, gave him detailed instructions on how to complete the project, and procured for him through the Chetnik Army commander a large number of Yugoslav laborers.

The remaining six officers, including Brooks himself, he divided into two-man teams to investigate possible sites for another field. In this manner two better locations were discovered, and work was immediately begun on those fields as well. In the meantime, radio contact with 15th Air Force was reestablished. A request was made for urgently needed supplies and a message sent regarding the work that was being done on the first field. Two transports came shortly thereafter and dropped a considerable quantity of needed supplies. Acting under instructions previously issued by Captain Brooks, the group quartered nearest the dropping site successfully brought in all these supplies. Several days later when construction on the first field had progressed to the point where it was usable, the 15th Air Force was notified. A message came back from headquarters that eight aircraft would arrive that evening, each with a capacity of 12 men. Captain Brooks then sent runners to alert the first 96 men scheduled to go.

The field was cleared and signal fires built. One officer was put in charge of the men and ordered to have each group of twelve men leave the woods only when its plane was ready. During this time no one else was to be on the field. Another officer was detailed to meet the planes as they landed and park them for loading. A third officer was detailed to guide them out for takeoff. Only four C-47A aircraft, from the 60th TCG, 12th Air Force, in Brindisi, Italy, came in that night, the first carrying a doctor, several assistants, and medical supplies. These airplanes landed, unloaded, loaded with evacuees, and left. Captain Brooks learned from the pilot of the first plane to land that the operation was to continue throughout the following morning with friendly fighter cover. He immediately sent runners to all the different groups.

By 07:00 on 10 August 1944 all the remaining evacuees had been assembled in the woods adjacent to the field. To assist the aircraft, Brooks had had the field marked with strips of parachutes. Twenty men were loaded into each aircraft. Only after all the other evacuees had been loaded did Brooks get aboard the last airplane. The pilot counted 21 men aboard, one more than the maximum. Assuming that one would have to be left on the ground, Brooks immediately debarked, but a recount by the pilot revealed that there were only 20 passengers, and Brooks reboarded. A total of 240 Americans, seven British, 12 Russians, five French, and five Italian officers and men were evacuated in this operation.

=== Airlift from Pranjani to Bari ===
At midnight on 2 August 1944, an American plane flew over Pranjani, near Mihailovic's headquarters in central Serbia, where a fire burned as a previously agreed signal. OSS intelligence agents Captain George Musulin, Lieutenant Michael Rayachich, and Sergeant Arthur Jiblian and their radio equipment descended by parachute; they were there to set the operation up. Captain Musulin's first task was to request from Mihailović that all the rescued airmen be gathered in the area for the forthcoming evacuation. Musulin was assured that the Chetniks had done everything possible for the airmen, including medical care. They were to have armed escorts to the evacuation point. In the meantime, to allow for a possible German attack on Pranjani, Mihailović was instructed to build a reserve airstrip in the Dragačevo district.

Mihailović decided to send additional representatives to Italy to assist Topalović with his mission. They were; the president of the Independent Democratic Party Adam Pribićević, Supreme Court judge Dr. Vladimir Belajčić, Captain Zvonimir Vučković, and Ivan Kovač, a Slovene who taught King Peter II before the war.

Meanwhile, on Sunday, 6 August 1944, The New York Times published an interview with Mihailović by journalist Cyrus Leo Sulzberger.

Near Pranjani, Chetnik sentries detained a civilian identified as Ivan Popov; one sentinel had his suspicions aroused because he thought he had seen Popov leave a Gestapo building in Belgrade in a German officers' uniform. Captain Vučković ordered the man to be executed. However, the civilian was reprieved at the last minute when he showed Vučković a letter signed by Mihailović. The incident was reported to the general, who ordered that he be sent to his headquarters. Popov was a double agent for the Yugoslavs and British in the Gestapo. He was also Dušan Popov's brother. Popov (British codenamed Dreadnought, Yugoslav (Chetnik) codenamed Eskulap), was evacuated along with American airmen to Italy. The young aviators had no idea that one of the passengers was a former Gestapo officer.

The largest evacuation from Pranjani began at 03:00 on 10 August. Four C-47s flew in; they were followed by a further six. Other sources state there were 12 or 14 US transports. These aircraft may have been protected by 50 (P-51 Mustang and P-38 Lightning) fighters of the 15th Air Force, but one source indicates they were protected by six Royal Air Force Spitfires. Ground security was provided by the Morava group under Captain Aleksandar Milošević. A total of 237 men were evacuated.

The operation was repeated on 12, 15, and 18 August; a further 210 airmen were evacuated. A new OSS unit, under Operation Ranger, was led by Colonel Robert H. McDowell. Musulin flew out of Pranjani on 29 August, in the same aircraft that had brought McDowell. Musulin's replacement was Captain Nick Lalich, who flew to Pranjani on 10 August.

=== Evacuation from Koceljeva ===
On the eve of the invasion by the Red Army in September 1944, the Supreme Command of the Yugoslav Army, along with the Halyard and Ranger missions, left Pranjani and transferred to Mačva. Another improvised airstrip at Koceljeva had been built between 15–17 September. The runway was 400 meters long. Twenty airmen, a Frenchman, a few Italians, and two American medical officers were evacuated on 17 September.

=== Evacuation from Boljanić ===
A third improvised airstrip was built between 22 October-1 November at Boljanić near Doboj in eastern Bosnia. It was used to evacuate the Supreme Command of the Yugoslav Army and 15 US airmen on 27 September. These aviators had jumped from two damaged aircraft in June 1944 into Milino Selo, in eastern Bosnia. They were accommodated in the houses of Luke Panić and several prominent farmers in the village of Boljanić, and rescued by the Chetnik Ozren Corps' Major Cvijetin Todić. Two C-47s, covered by seven fighters, landed. The evacuees, including Captain John Milodragovich and Lieutenant Michael Rajachich (both OSS), were taken to Bari. McDowell tried to persuade Mihailović to accompany him to Italy, but he refused, saying:

I prefer to lose my life in my country, than to live as an outcast in strange land. I'll stay with my soldiers and my people to the end, in order to fulfill duty that my King gave to me. For King and Fatherland – Freedom or Death!

Two C-47s, one piloted by Colonel George Kraigher, (a pioneer in the development of Pan American World Airways), the other by First Lieutenant John L. Dunn, left Italy at 11:00 on 27 December 1944. Escorted by 16 P-38s, they reached the emergency landing field at Boljanić at 12:55. Spotting a hole in the overcast, Kraigher led the way in, to land on a 1,700-foot strip that was frozen just enough to support the weight of a C-47. The transports were met by Captain Lalich. The aircraft were quickly loaded with 20 American airmen, one American citizen, two Yugoslavian (Chetnik) officers, four French, four Italian army personnel, and two remaining Halyard team members, Lalich and his radio operator, Arthur Jibilian. Lalich tried once more to persuade Mihailović to accompany them to Italy. Mihailović remained consistent in his intention to stay with his soldiers. The aircraft took off at 13:15.

== Number of rescued airmen ==
- 237 men evacuated from Pranjani on 9–10 August
- 210 men evacuated from Pranjani on 12, 15, 18 August
- 20 men evacuated from Koceljeva on 17 September
- 15 men evacuated from the village of Boljanić on 1 November
- 20 men evacuated from Boljanić on 27 December

A total of 417 Allied airmen were airlifted from Chetnik territory during Operation Halyard, of which 343 were Americans.

== Members of the mission ==
Name	Rank (at time of mission)	Role	Period of mission	Honors	Notes
Arthur Jibilian	Navy Specialist 1st Class Petty Officer	Radio operator	2 August–27 December 1944	Silver Star (plus citation); Medal of Honor (2008)	
Nick Lalich	Captain	Member; Head of Mission	10–28 August (member); 29 August–27 December 1944 (head)	Legion of Merit	
Jack Mitrani, MD	Captain	Head of the medical team, with two medical assistants	10 August–17 September 1944		
George Musulin	Captain	Head of Mission	2–19 August 1944	Legion of Merit	
Mike Rayachich	Lieutenant	Member	2–19 August (Note: After the Halyard mission, Rayachich served as a member of the Renger mission to 1 November 1944.)	Legion of Merit (with oak leaf cluster)	
George Vujnovich		Helped organize and supervise the mission		Bronze Star Medal	

== Mission ==
This operation took place between August and December 1944 from a crudely constructed forest airfield created by Serbian peasants in Pranjani. It is little known today, and largely unknown to most Americans. It is the subject of the 2007 book The Forgotten 500: The Untold Story of the Men Who Risked All For the Greatest Rescue Mission of World War II, by Gregory A. Freeman. Freeman described it as one of the greatest rescue stories ever told that tells the story of how the airmen were downed in a country they knew nothing about, and how the Serbian villagers were willing to sacrifice their own lives to save the lives of the air crews.

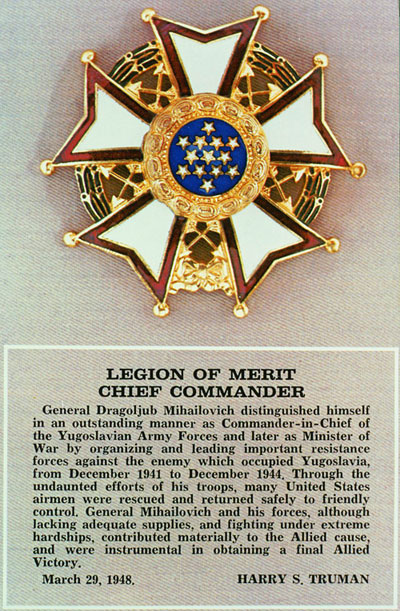
Mihailović was posthumously awarded the U.S. Legion of Merit

The OSS planned an elaborate rescue involving C-47 cargo planes landing in enemy territory. It was an extremely risky operation, involving the planes not only entering enemy territory without being shot down themselves, but also landing, retrieving the downed airmen, then taking off and flying out of that same territory, again without being shot down themselves. The rescue was a complete success, but received little to no publicity. This was partly due to the timing, the world's attention being focused on the conflict in northern France.

Because of this operation, and due to the efforts of Major Richard Felman, United States President Harry S. Truman posthumously awarded Mihailović the Legion of Merit for his contribution to the Allied victory during World War II. Initially, this high award and the story of the rescue was classified secret by the U.S. State Department so as not to offend the-then Communist government of Yugoslavia. Such a display of appreciation for the Chetniks would not have been welcome as the Western Allies, who had supported the Chetniks early in World War II, switched sides to Josip Broz Tito's Partisans for the latter part of the war. The award was presented to Mihailović's daughter Gordana Mihajlovic by the US State Department on May 9, 2005.

== Commemoration ==
Authority to erect a monument to Mihailovich was given in 1989 by the National Committee of American Airmen in Washington, District of Columbia, in recognition of the role he played in saving the lives of more than five hundred United States airmen in Yugoslavia during World War II.

On September 12, 2004, five years after the NATO armed conflict against Yugoslavia, four American veterans, Clare Musgrove, Arthur Jibilian, George Vujnovich and Robert Wilson, visited Pranjani for the unveiling of a commemorative plaque. A bill introduced in the US House of Representatives by Bob Latta on July 31, 2009, requested that Jibilian be awarded the Medal of Honor for his part in Operation Halyard.

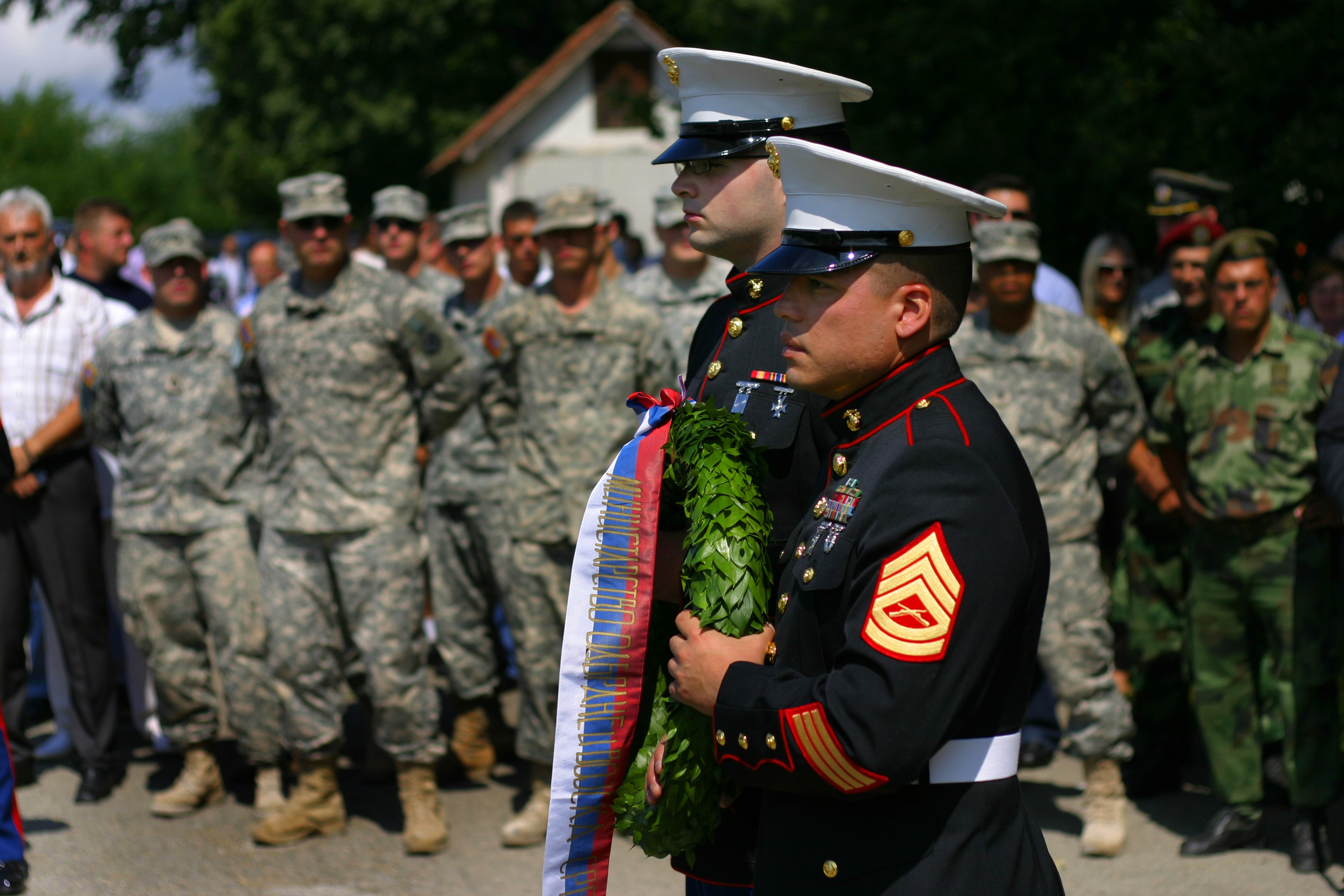
Marine Security Guards for the U.S. Embassy in Belgrade, Serbia Lance Corporal Aaron Johnston and Gunnery Sgt. Laureano Perez lay a wreath at the Halyard Mission memorial in Pranjani, Serbia.

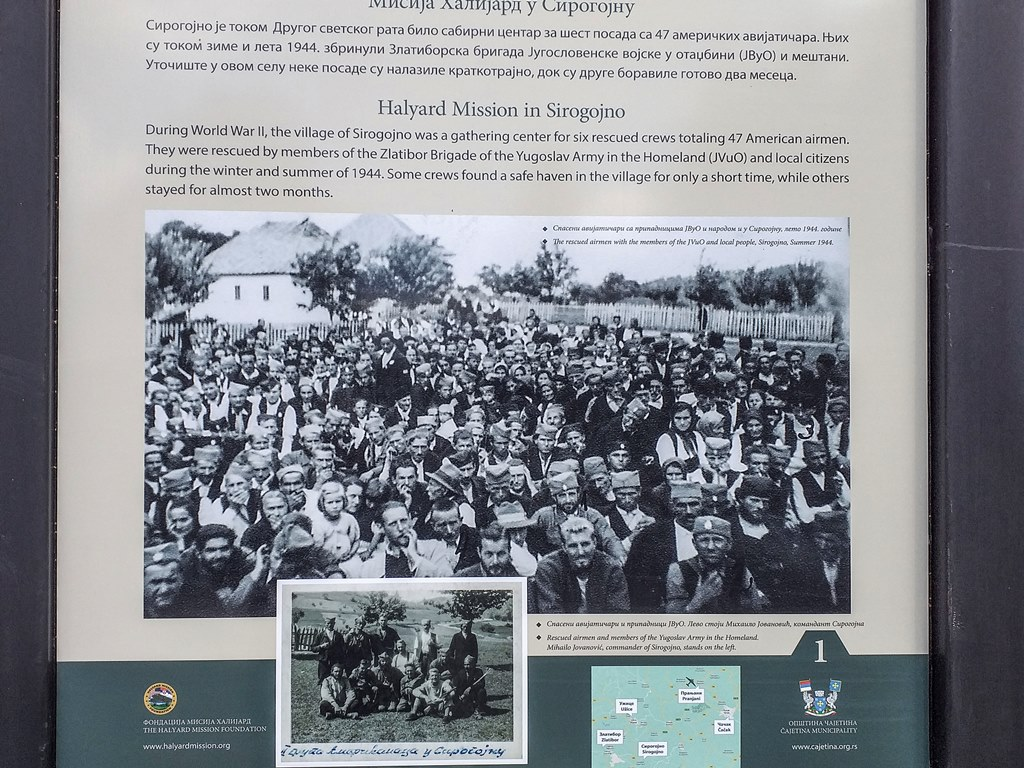
Operation Halyard memorial of the Zlatibor Corps in Sirogojno

On Veterans' Day, 2007, the U.S. Ambassador to Serbia, Cameron Munter, visited Pranjani and presented the citizens of the area with a proclamation signed by the Governor of the State of Ohio expressing gratitude to the Serbian families that rescued hundreds of U.S. airmen whose aircraft had been shot down by Nazi forces in World War II.

On October 17, 2010, George Vujnovich was awarded the Bronze Star in a ceremony in New York City for his role in the operation. Vujnovich trained the volunteers who carried out the rescue, teaching them how to blend in with other Serbians, by mastering mundane tasks conforming to local custom, such as tying and tucking their shoelaces and pushing food onto their forks with their knives during meals.

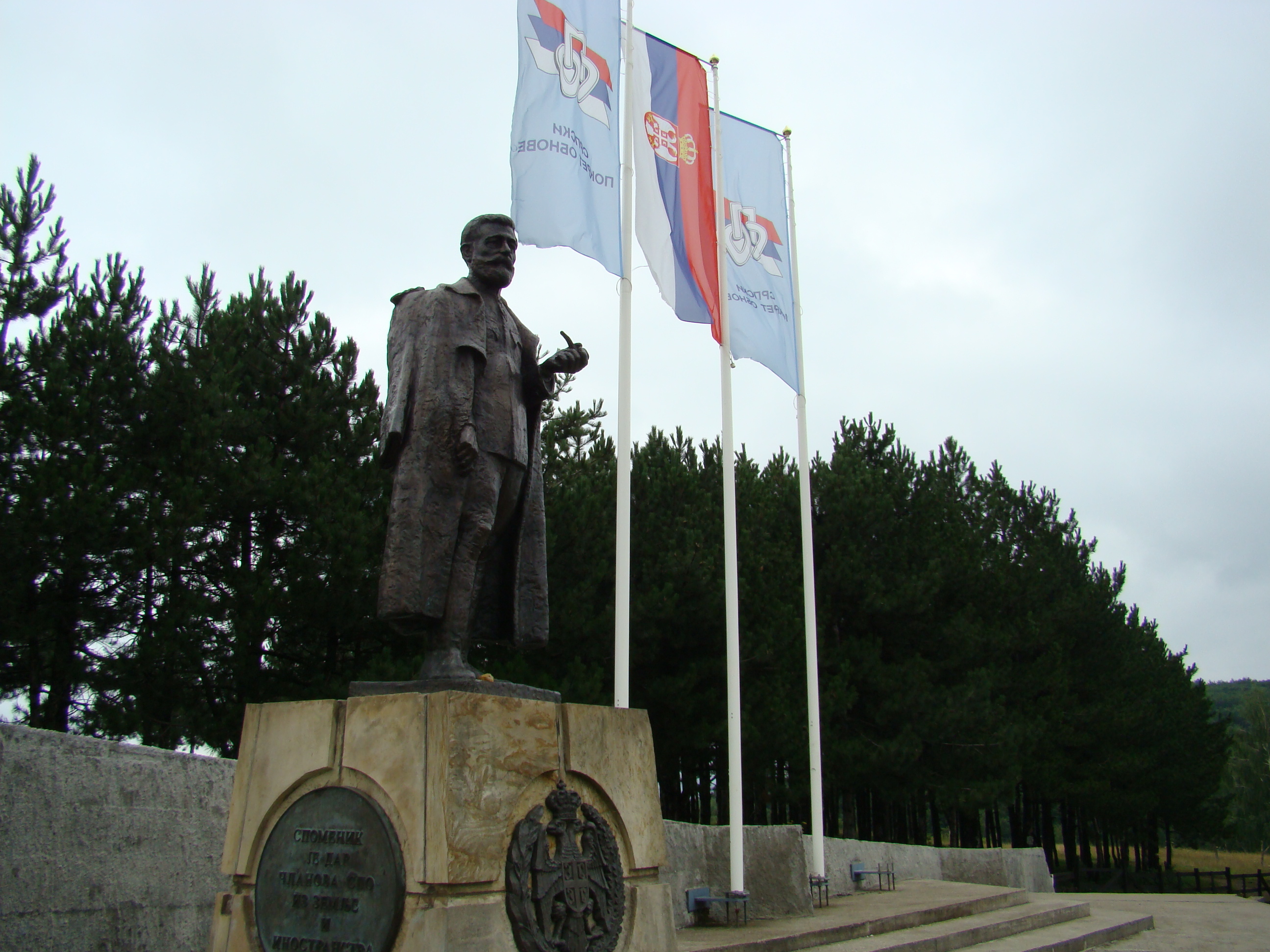
Monument to General Draza Mihailovic at Ravna Gora near historical improvised airstrip in the village Pranjani, Serbia.

The U.S. Embassy in Belgrade, in cooperation with the Euro-Atlantic Initiative and the citizens of Pranjani, initiated a project to construct a library and youth center in Pranjani which will help the education of local children and enhance commemoration of the Halyard Mission. The project will mark a historical bond between the Serbian and American people and the state partnership between Serbia and the State of Ohio, which was established in 2006. The project will include an effort to educate both the Serbian and American public about the Halyard Mission, through photographic exhibitions, an internet presentation and the production of a documentary movie. The library-youth center project consists of the construction of a multipurpose facility. It will serve as a library and the center for multimedia education of young people and farmers from the Pranjani area. It will be equipped with Internet access and as a memorial center for the Halyard Mission which will include a permanent exhibition of photographs, objects and documents related to the evacuation mission of Allied airmen and the wartime alliance between the people of Serbia and the U.S. Part of the Center's exhibits will be given to the National Museum of the United States Air Force, Wright-Patterson Air Base in Ohio where a special exhibition area will be opened about Serbia's role in the rescue of the airmen in World War II. Similar to the Vietnam Memorial in Washington, D.C., one wall of the Pranjani center will include the names of all the Allied airmen that were rescued during the Halyard Mission and the Serbian families that hid and cared for them. The Library will be built immediately adjacent to the primary school and Pranjani church, which was the place used for ceremonies of friendship and cooperation by citizens of the area, the Ravna Gora movement (Yugoslav Army in the Fatherland), and the U.S. mission. Another segment will be built on Galovića field in Pranjani where the U.S. Air Force evacuated the airmen. This part of the project envisions the construction of a hangar and the placement of one C-47 aircraft inside it. In addition, multi-language plaques and maps will be erected that will allow history lovers and interested tourists to become acquainted with the Halyard Mission and the historic heritage of the area.

== See also ==
- Operation Reunion - rescue operation of downed Allied airmen from Romania
