= Konstantin Fotić =

Serbian lawyer and diplomat (1891–1959)

- Konstantin Fotić
- Born: 4 February 1891; Šabac, Kingdom of Serbia
- Died: 14 February 1959 (aged 68); Washington, D.C., United States

Konstantin A. Fotić (Serbian Cyrillic: Константин Фотић; 4 February 1891 – 14 February 1959) was a Serbian lawyer and diplomat.

He is best remembered as a Royal Yugoslav ambassador to the United States in Washington, D.C., during the most crucial time for the young European kingdom prior to and during the Second World War. At the war's end, he wrote a seminal book "The War We Lost" which summed up Yugoslavia's predicament during the war and the Anglo-American Alliance's abandonment to Josip Broz's Partisans at the expense of exiled King Peter II and his General Dragoljub Mihailovich in the homeland. When Mihailovich was put on trial by the Yugoslav Communists, Konstantin Fotić from Washington fought for his release along with all the former U.S. MIA airmen but to no avail. Mihailovich was executed, his remains mysteriously disappeared, and the country came under a communist dictatorship that lasted from 1945 to 1989.

== Biography ==
He was born in Šabac, Kingdom of Serbia, and came from the Radosavljević family, who later changed their surname to Fotić, as Fotić's apprentice inherited Milan Radosavljević's shop, marrying his widow and adopting his son. His father, Alex, was a lawyer and Member of Parliament. Konstantin Fotić began his education in his hometown and continued in Belgrade, where he graduated from the Second Belgrade Gymnasium in 1909. He completed his law studies in Bordeaux in 1912, and received his doctorate in Paris in 1914. He served his military service in the student cavalry squadron in Šabac from 1 August 1912 to 1 September 1913. He participated in the First Balkan War as a private cavalry squadron, and in the Second Balkan War he was a sergeant in the II Cavalry Regiment "Tsar Dušan". During the First World War, he was a lieutenant and lieutenant in the II Cavalry Regiment "Tsar Dushan" (until 15 February 1915), a cavalry lieutenant in the service of the Military Railway Inspection (from 15 February to 15 October 1915), a liaison officer with French troops. at the headquarters of the 122nd Infantry Division on the Thessaloniki front (from 15 October 1916 to 16 December 1916). During his military service, he was awarded the Silver Medal for Courage (1913), the Gold Medal for Courage (1914), and the French Croix de Guerre (1916). He left the wars with the rank of cavalry captain of the 1st class.

== Diplomatic career ==
By a decree of 1 September 1916, he was appointed clerk of the Ministry of Foreign Affairs of the Kingdom of Serbia, for which he was dismissed from further military service on 16 December of the same year. During the war, he served in Corfu, Bern, and Paris. At the Paris Peace Conference, he was secretary of the Delegation of the Kingdom of Serbs, Croats, and Slovenes, and then worked in the office of Foreign Minister Ante Trumbić until the end of July 1920. During 1920 and 1921, he was secretary of embassies in Vienna and London. The Minister of Foreign Affairs, Nikola Pašić, intended to appoint him the first diplomatic official in Geneva in order to maintain constant contact with the General Secretariat of the League of Nations, but he soon gave up that intention, and remained in office for the next three years. Secretary of the Embassy in London until September 1924.

The Minister of Foreign Affairs, Momčilo Ninčić, elected him the Secretary-General of the delegation of the Kingdom of Serbs, Croats, and Slovenes at the 5th session of the Assembly of the League of Nations in 1924. He was then transferred to work in the Second Political Department of the Ministry of Foreign Affairs, which was in charge of all affairs within the competence of the League of Nations. He also drafted the "Blue Book on St. Naum", which was a collection of official documents on Yugoslav views on the border with Albania. The following year, he was appointed head of the Second Department of the General Political Directorate of the Ministry of Foreign Affairs, after an internal reorganization of affairs, which was in charge of the affairs of the League of Nations. At the same time, he worked on the position of Yugoslav minorities abroad and the signing of the Concordat. The new Minister of Foreign Affairs, Ninko Perić, decided, in February 1927, to appoint him as a permanent delegate of the Kingdom of Serbs, Croats, and Slovenes to the League of Nations in Geneva. He remained in this position until February 14, 1929, when his personal friend and Minister of Foreign Affairs, Vojislav Marinković, decided to appoint him General Director of the Ministry of Foreign Affairs. He held the new position from April 1929 to October 1930, when he was appointed acting president. the first (political) assistant minister of foreign affairs, which ended the conflict between Vojislav Marinković and Bogoljub Jevtić, which lasted a little over a year and a half. He remained in this position until January 1932, when he was appointed permanent delegate to the League of Nations in Geneva for the second time.

During his work in Geneva, 1932-1935, Konstantin Fotić distinguished himself among world diplomats with his performances. He spoke on important issues, presenting briefly, clearly, and concisely the views of the Kingdom of Yugoslavia or the Lesser Entente. As a close associate of Vojislav Marinković, until the middle of 1932, he was his important advisor for various international issues that were current in that period. One of the most difficult tasks he worked on was the Yugoslav lawsuit before the Council of the League of Nations against Hungary for its involvement in the assassination of King Alexander I Karadjordjević at Marseille in 1934. After the arrival of Milan Stojadinović at the head of the Ministry of Foreign Affairs, in June 1935, the transfer of Konstantin Fotić as a deputy in Warsaw was planned. He vehemently opposed this proposal, believing that in that way he was set back in the service and publicly humiliated, demanding that he be transferred to London, Paris or Washington, D.C. He argued that he resented Polish diplomats for their behavior after the Marseille assassination and as an open opponent of the policy of Polish-German rapprochement. In consultations with Prince Pavle Karadjordjević, Stojadinović decided to move him to the United States.

== Ambassador to Washington ==
Konstantin Fotić accepted his new duty in Washington on 25 October 1935. He remained in the United States until the end of his official career, first as an MP, and from September 1942, after raising the rank of diplomatic mission, as the first ambassador of the Kingdom of Yugoslavia to the United States. During the period 1935-1939, he devoted himself to work on specific Yugoslav-American issues, his attitude towards the Yugoslav diaspora, but he did not miss the opportunity to indirectly criticize the new course of Yugoslav foreign policy. His activities gained more weight since 1939, when the United States was much more interested in the development of the military situation in Europe, especially after their entry into World War II. Among the more important issues, until April 1941, were talks on American material aid to the Yugoslav army and the transfer of Yugoslav gold reserves from London to New York.

After the Tito–Šubašić Agreements Fotić was forced out of the Yugoslav government-in-exile in the summer of 1944 and King Peter II and his cabinet were equally ignored. In Fotić's place came Sava Kosanović, Nikola Tesla's nephew who cremated Tesla's remains against the wishes of many (including the Serbian Orthodox Church) and his archives were shipped to Communist Yugoslavia, two acts that would never have occurred under Fotić's ambassadorship. After the war, Fotić stayed close to Serbian émigré circles since Yugoslav harmony was totally extinguished in the diaspora as a result of both the civil war and the war itself. He wrote memoirs on the Second World War entitled The War We Lost: The Tragedy of Yugoslavia and the Mistake of the West, in which he described Winston Churchill as the chief "villain" of what happened to his country. He died in Washington, D.C., aged 68.

== Sources ==
- Milićević, Nataša (1998). "Konstantin Fotić - diplomata od karijere" (PDF). Istorija 20. Veka (1): 143–162.
