= Roger A. Lalich =

United States Army general

Roger A. Lalich is a retired brigadier general in the National Guard of the United States and former assistant adjutant general of the Joint Staff of the Wisconsin Army and Air National Guard. In addition, he served as the State Surgeon of Wisconsin.

== Biography ==
Lalich graduated from the University of Colorado at Boulder in 1970 and the Medical School of the Oklahoma State University-Stillwater in 1977. He would enter private practice as an OB/GYN.

== Career ==
Lalich originally enlisted in the Colorado Army National Guard in 1970 and would be commissioned and officer in the Wisconsin Army National Guard in the Medical Corps in 1989. Assignments he has served include a tour of duty in the Iraq War.

Awards he has received include the Meritorious Service Medal with oak leaf cluster, the Army Commendation Medal with oak leaf cluster, the Army Achievement Medal, the Army Reserve Components Achievement Medal with silver oak leaf cluster, the National Defense Service Medal with two service stars, the Global War on Terrorism Expeditionary Medal, the Military Outstanding Volunteer Service Medal, the Armed Forces Reserve Medal with hourglass device and mobilization device, the Army Service Ribbon, and the Flight Surgeon Badge.
