= Maria Lalić =

British artist

Maria Lalić (born 1952) is a British artist. She studied Painting at Central School of Art and Design (BA) and the Chelsea School of Art (MA) and was Fellow in Painting at Bath Academy of Art 1977–8.

== Work ==
As Principal Lecturer, she teaches PhD students at the Bath School of Art and Design on a Master of Fine Art programme co-written by herself. She has also taught at The Slade School of Fine Art, Central School of Art and Design and Goldsmiths College and has been external examiner for the PG Diploma programme at Goldsmiths College and PhD at University of Plymouth, Bath Spa University, University of Gloucester, Goldsmiths College, University of London.

Her 'Metal and Colour' series explores the origination of pigments from various metals. She is also known to use 19 grades of pencil within her drawings, as a means to challenge the medium.

Lalić has exhibited work throughout the UK, and Europe and in the US and New Zealand. In 1997, she was shortlisted for the Jerwood Painting Prize and has work in a number of UK public art collections including Tate, Victoria and Albert Museum and Arts Council England.

=== History Paintings ===
She is best known for monochrome paintings named 'History Paintings' (1996-2004). These use the history of certain pigments as a basis for the artworks. In 2000, this series was on display in the exhibition 'Blue: borrowed and new' at the New Art Gallery, Walsall.

"The individual titles of this series of paintings list the separate pigments used to make them. The paint layers can be seen at the edges. The artist says that these edges can be read ''almost like a bar code'', making it possible to ''uncover the history of each painting''. They come from a group of fifty such works, which trace the history of painting by classifying and indexing the development of artist''s pigments, from early cave paintings to the present day. The information is taken from a chart produced by the paint manufacturers Winsor & Newton." Tate website, September 2004
