= Veljko Lalić =

Serbian journalist

Veljko Lalić (born 13 July 1976 in Belgrade) is a Serbian journalist, editor and publicist.

He is the editor-in-chief and owner of Nedeljnik, popular news magazine in Serbia, publisher of the Serbian edition of The New York Times, Le Monde diplomatique, and numerous other publications and books.

Lalić is the author of several books on history, including a Serbian bestseller on Prince Paul and the Coup of March 27, 1941.

He holds a master's degree from the University of Belgrade, and a specialization from the Faculty of Political Science, BU.

== Surveillance case ==
In February 2020, after Serbia's then Defence Minister Aleksandar Vulin commented on an article "by Mr Dragan Sutanovac in Nedeljnik" that has never been published by the newspaper, the Serbian public reacted and called out for the investigation.

How Vulin had the access to private email correspondence between Lalić and Šutanovac, was Nedeljnik under surveillance - those were the most pressing issues of this case.

Reporters Without Borders (RSF) called out on the Serbian authorities to investigate the possibility that the government spied on and intercepted emails between an opposition politician and the independent weekly Nedeljnik. The investigation's findings must be made public, RSF said.

"We are concerned that emails between opposition politicians and independent media outlets are being spied on and intercepted by the government," RSF editor-in-chief Pauline Adès-Méve said. "We call on the authorities to shed all possible light on this matter." Nedeljnik wanted a separate and independent Commission that would find out the truth.

== Prizes and awards ==
Aleksandar Tijanić Annual Award, for journalistic bravery, Journalists' Association of Serbia, 2018

Grand prix "Zlatna Nika", for the best reportage, 23rd edition of International festival of reportage and media, Interfer, 2018

Annual award "Dimitrije Davidović", for newspaper editing, Journalists' Association of Serbia, 2015

Award "Dragiša Kašiković", for distinguished professional, art, and scientific achievement and spreading the freedom of creativity 2015

Golden medal "Miša Anastasijević", for objective reporting and responsibility of public conversation, Belgrade Chamber of Commerce and Faculty of Technical Sciences, 2010

The Man of the Year, a columnist of the year, voted by colleagues and public figures, The Man magazine 2010

Annual award "Laza Kostić", for feuilleton, Journalists' Association of Serbia, 2004

Certificate of Honour (Professional Development Program in the United States), International Center of Journalists, 2011.

== Books ==
Prince Paul: The Truth About March 27 A history bestseller, was published in 2008 by the historian Miodrag Janković and journalist Veljko Lalić.

Knez Pavle: Samoubistvo Jugoslavije - Prince Paul: The Suicide of Yugoslavia, circulation 20,000 copies.

Milan Stojadinović: Ekonomski reformator ili profašistički premijer - Milan Stojadinović: An economic reformer or a pro-fascists Prime Minister?, circulation 30,000 copies.

Dragi Jovanović: Život i zločini srpskog Huvera - Dragi Jovanović: The Life and Crimes of Serbia's Hoover, circulation 20,000 copies.
