= Nataša Lalić =

Serbian politician (born 1983)

Nataša Lalić (Serbian Cyrillic: Наташа Лалић; born 1 October 1983) is a politician in Serbia. She served in the Assembly of Vojvodina from 2012 to 2016 as a member of the League of Social Democrats of Vojvodina (LSV).

== Private life and career ==
Lalić is from Zrenjanin in Vojvodina and has a degree in environmental engineering.

== Political career ==
Lalić received the ninth position on the LSV's electoral list in the 2012 Vojvodina provincial election and narrowly missed direct election when the list won eight mandates. She was awarded a seat in the assembly on 20 June 2012 after party leader Nenad Čanak declined his provincial mandate to sit in the National Assembly of Serbia. The LSV was part of Vojvodina's coalition government during this time, and Lalić was a supporter of the ministry.

She was given the twelfth position on the LSV's list in the 2012 provincial election and was again not directly elected when the list won nine mandates. She appears to have declined an opportunity to return to the assembly in November 2016 following the resignation of Đorđe Stojšić, whose mandate was taken by Saša Šućurović, the thirteenth candidate on the list.

She also appeared as an LSV candidate in the 2016 Serbian parliamentary election, in too low a position for direct election to be a realistic possibility.

As of 2019, Lalić is secretary of the LSV's executive board and a member of the party's main board.
