= Zvonimir Vučković =

Yugoslav Chetnik leader (1916–2004)

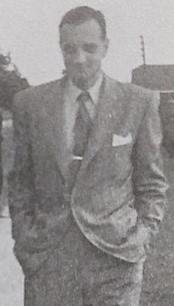
- Vučković in 1951
- Born: 6 July 1916; Bijeljina, Bosnia and Herzegovina, Austria-Hungary
- Died: 21 December 2004 (aged 88); Ojai, California, U.S.
- Spouse: Anka née Smiljanić
- Military career
- Allegiance: Kingdom of Yugoslavia
- Branch: Chetniks
- Rank: Major
- Nickname: Zvonko
- Commands: Takovo Chetnik Detachment; 1st Ravna Gora Corp
- Conflicts: Capture of Gornji Milanovac (29 September 1941); Operation Halyard
- Awards: Order of the Star of Karađorđe

Zvonimir Vučković (Serbian Cyrillic: Звонимир Вучковић; 6 July 1916 — 21 December 2004) was a Yugoslav Chetnik military commander holding the rank of Major and vojvoda during World War II and one of the closest associates of Draža Mihailović.

Vučković was born in Bijeljina into the ethnically Croat Prkić family in 1916. After his father died when he was four, Vučkovićs mother married Aleksandar Vučković from Vranje. Zvonimir completed military academy in Belgrade and became military officer of the Royal Yugoslav Army, first in Zagreb, then in Belgrade. When he heard that the Yugoslav government had signed the Tripartite Pact with Nazi Germany on 25 March 1941, Vučković immediately left the country to join the Greek Army struggling against Fascist Italy as an act of protest. After his own country was invaded by the Axis he returned and in June 1941 joined guerrilla units of the Yugoslav Army in the Fatherland, commonly known as Chetniks.

In September he established the Takovo Chetnik Detachment and became its commander. On 29 September 1941 he commanded his detachment, supported by one unit of communist Partisans, and liberated Gornji Milanovac. He later became a commander of the 1st Ravna Gora Corps. He left Yugoslavia as member of the Chetnik political and military mission at the end of Operation Halyard, also organized by him, and spent the rest of his life in US.

== Early life ==
Zvonimir Vučković was born in Bijeljina on 6 July 1916 in the ethnic Croatian family, of father Petar Prkić who hailed from Vareš and mother Anka from Makarska. After Zvonimir's father died in 1920, his mother married Aleksandar Vučković from Vranje. In 1930 Zvonimir's stepfather was transferred to Zagreb. In 1931, Zvonimir was accepted into Military Academy in Belgrade, when he was 16. He completed his education in Zagreb, where his parents lived, he served in 30th Artillery Division "Prince Tomislav". In September 1939 Zvonimir's stepfather died when Germany signed the Ribbentrop-Molotov treaty with the Soviet Union. Right after the funeral of his stepfather, based on his request Zvonimir was transferred to Belgrade to Cavalry Artillery Division of the Royal Guard. He was a very good friend with Momčilo Smiljanić and Savo Konavlinka.

== World War II ==
As an act of protest when Yugoslav government signed the Tripartite Pact with Nazi Germany on 25 March 1941, Vučković left the country together with two of his associates to join the Greek Army struggling against Fascist Italy. After the Axis invaded Yugoslavia, Vučković returned to German-occupied Serbia and went to Ravna Gora on 27 June 1941 and joined the Yugoslav Army in the Fatherland guerrilla forces known as Chetniks. Following Mihailović's orders, Vučković established a new detachment (Takovo Chetnik Detachment) in the region of Takovo County which was his zone of operation in September 1941. The code name of Vučković was Felix. On 29 September 1941 Lieutenant Vučković and his Takovo Chetnik Detachment together with one unit of Partisans attacked and captured Gornji Milanovac. In 1942 he was awarded the Order of the Star of Karađorđe.

Vučković was commander of the 1st Ravna Gora Corps. The official journal of the 1st Ravna Gora Corps was Ravnogorac (Равногорац) published since October 1943.

Vučković was one of the main organizers of Operation Halyard conducted from 2 August to 27 December 1944. After the last Allied pilots were evacuated Mihailović sent Vučković with the political-military Chetnik mission to Allied HQ in Bari. The other members were Adam Pribićević, Vladimir Belajčić and Ivan Kovač.

== Post WWII ==
After the war Vučković went to France and then to United States, where he worked as an engineer. From 1952 to 1956, he was a member of the editorial team of Democratic Тhought (Демократска мисао) headed by Adam Pribićević. He published his texts in Voice of Canadian Serbs and Our Word of Desimir Tošić. Vučković died on 21 December 2004 in California, on the same day that the Assembly of the Republic of Serbia adopted the law which equalized rights of Partisans and Chetniks. Vučković was elected as member of an association known as Liberation (Ослобођење). His book of war memories was published in 1977 and received an award Slobodan Jovanović by Association of Serbian Writers and Artists from London as the best book published in that year.

== Bibliography ==
After the war Vučković published his war memoirs which are generally accepted as reliable.

Vučković's bibliography includes:

- Vučković, Zvonimir (1980). Sećanja iz rata [Memories from the war]. Vol. 1. Naše delo.
- Vučković, Zvonimir (1984). Od otpora - do građanskog rata: 2-a knjiga Sećanja iz rata [From resistance to civil war: 2nd book of Memories from the war]. Vol. 2. Veritas Foundation Press.
- Vučković, Zvonimir (2004). A Balkan Tragedy--Yugoslavia, 1941-1946: Memoirs of a Guerilla Fighter. East European Monographs. Columbia University Press. ISBN 978-0-88033-537-9.
- Vučković, Zvonimir; Krstić, Uglješa (2001). Ravnogorska istorijska čitanka: povest nacionalnog pokreta otpora u II svetskom ratu kroz dela učesnika i svedoka: jubilarno izdanje povodom šezdesetgodišnjice, 1941-2001 [Ravna Gora historical textbook: the history of the national resistance movement in World War II through the works of participants and witnesses: jubilee edition 1941-2001]. Bajat.

== Sources ==
- Beloff, Nora (1985). Tito's flawed legacy: Yugoslavia & the West since 1939. Westview Press. ISBN 978-0-8133-0322-2.
- Chalou, George C. (December 1995). The Secret War: The Office of Strategic Services in World War II. DIANE Publishing. ISBN 978-0-7881-2598-0.
- Karchmar, Lucien (1973). Draz̆a Mihailović and the Rise of the C̆etnik Movement, 1941-1942. Department of History, Stanford University.
- Kosić, Nikola A. (1984). Dnevnik: 17 mart-28 mart 1941 [Diary: 17–28 March 1941]. Neven Publishing. p. 8. "били су напустили земљу још 25. марта, у знак револта, и отишли у Грчку, поручници: Звонимир Вучковић, Момчило Смиљанић и Сава Конвалинка, 25. март, уторак пре подне."
- Leskovac, Mladen; Forišković, Alexander; Popov, Chedomir (2004). Српски биографски речник [Serbian Biographical Dictionary]. Budućnost (Будућност). p. 536. ISBN 978-868365162-7. "Звонимир Вучковић, командант Првог равногорског корпуса ЈВО [Zvonimir Vuckovic, commander of the First Ravna Gora Corps JVO]"
- Matić, Milan B.; Vesović, Milan (1995). Ravnogorska ideja u štampi i propagandi četničkog pokreta u Srbiji 1941-1944 [The idea of Ravna Gora in the press and propaganda of the Chetnik movement in Serbia 1941-1944]. ISI. ISBN 9788674030639.
- Naša reč: organ Saveza Oslobodjenje [Our word: the organ of the Liberation Alliance]. Savez. 1982. p. 12. "Slobodoljubiv vojnik, koji je došao do uverenja da će Na mesnička vlada kapitulirati pred Hitlerom ulaskom u Trojni pakt, 25. marta 1941, Zvonimir Vučković odlučuje sa dvojicom Svojih drugova da ..."
- Pešić, Miodrag D. (2002). Operation Air Bridge: Serbian Chetniks and the Rescued American Airmen in World War II. Serbian Master's Society. ISBN 978-86-82235-12-5.
- Radisavljević, Zoran (15 February 2016). "Hrvat u štabu Draže Mihailovića" [A Croat in Draža Mihailović's headquarters]. Politika (in Serbian).
- "Sećanja iz rata" [Memories from the war]. Večernje Novosti. 2 March 2016.
- Vučković, Zvonimir; Krstić, Uglješa (2001). Ravnogorska istorijska čitanka: povest nacionalnog pokreta otpora u II svetskom ratu kroz dela učesnika i svedoka: jubilarno izdanje povodom šezdesetgodišnjice, 1941-2001 [Ravna Gora historical textbook: the history of the national resistance movement in World War II through the works of participants and witnesses: jubilee edition 1941-2001]. Bajat.
