= Nick Lalich (basketball) =

Serbian-American army officer (1916–2001)

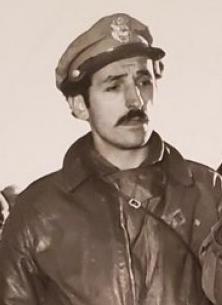
- Lalich in 1944

Personal information
- Born: May 8, 1916 Lorain, Ohio
- Died: May 11, 2001 (aged 85) Baltimore, Maryland
- Listed height: 5 ft 11 in (1.80 m)

Career information
- High school: East Technical (Cleveland, Ohio)
- College: Ohio (1935–1938)
- Playing career: 1938–1946
- Position: Guard

Career history
- 1938–1942: Cleveland May Co.
- 1945–1946: Youngstown Bears

Other information
- Military career
- Alma mater: Ohio University; Columbia University
- Spouse: Mira Vukcevich (m. 1952)
- Children: 1
- Allegiance: United States
- Branch: U.S. Army
- Service years: c. 1943–c. 1945
- Unit: Office of Strategic Services
- Known for: Operation Halyard
- Conflicts: World War II
- Awards: Legion of Merit
- Other work: Central Intelligence Agency (1952–1957); U.S. Department of Commerce

Nikola Andrew Lalich (May 8, 1916 – May 11, 2001) was a Serbian American professional basketball player and military officer, best known for his role in Operation Halyard.

== Basketball career ==
He played for the Youngstown Bears in the National Basketball League (NBL) during the 1945–46 season. He was a star college basketball player at Ohio University in the 1930s, where he earned a bachelor's degree in industrial arts. Later, Lalich earned a master's degree from Columbia University in New York. In 1984, Lalich was inducted into the Ohio Bobcats Hall of Fame.

His younger brother, Peter, played four seasons in the NBL and one game in the BAA.

== Military career ==
Lalich also served with the Office of Strategic Services (OSS) during World War II, helping to rescue and evacuate approximately 550 downed Allied fliers during Operation Halyard, without losing a single life or plane. Lalich was Head of Mission from 29 August to 27 December 1944, taking over from George Musulin, and was awarded with the Legion of Merit for his service. Lalich later worked for the Central Intelligence Agency in Greece from 1952 to 1957 and the U.S. Department of Commerce.

== Personal life ==
Lalich married Mira Vukcevich in 1952 and they had one child. He died, aged 85 years, in Baltimore on May 11, 2001.
