= George Musulin =

American intelligence officer

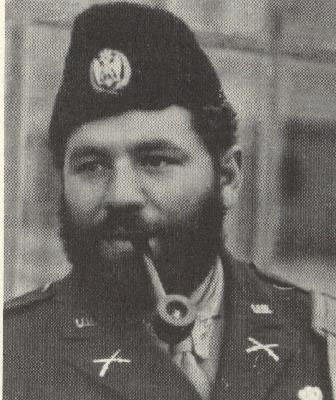
- Musulin in German-occupied Yugoslavia during World War II
- Born: George S. Musulin; April 9, 1914; New York, NY, U.S.
- Died: February 23, 1987 (aged 72)
- Education: University of Pittsburgh (BA)
- Military career
- Allegiance: United States
- Branch: U.S. Army (1942–1944); U.S. Navy (1944–1950)
- Service years: 1942–1950
- Rank: Captain (OSS)
- Nickname: Guv
- Service number: 0519461
- Units: Office of Strategic Services (army); Office of Naval Intelligence (navy)
- Known for: Operation Halyard
- Conflicts: World War II: Yugoslav theater
- Awards: Legion of Merit
- Other work: Central Intelligence Agency (1950–1974)

George "Guv" S. Musulin (April 9, 1914 – February 23, 1987) was a Serbian-American army and later navy officer of the Office of Strategic Services (OSS) and Office of Naval Intelligence during World War II, who later became an operative of the Central Intelligence Agency.

== Early life ==
George Musulin was born into a Serbian family in New York City and grew up in Johnstown, Pennsylvania. He graduated from the University of Pittsburgh, where he played for the university's football team during their national championship year of 1937. After college he played professional American football in Pittsburgh, St. Louis, and Chicago.

== Second World War ==
Musulin became a captain in the OSS during the Second World War. In mid-October 1943, Musulin, as part of a U.S. military mission, parachuted into Yugoslavia to the headquarters of General Draža Mihailović. In January 1944, Musulin was a delegate on the Ba Congress organized by Mihailović.

On 29 May 1944, Musulin, aided by Chetniks, was evacuated along with the British and American mission and 40 rescued Allied airmen to Bari, leaving General Mihailović without support. In Bari, Musulin proposed another rescue of American airmen shot down over Yugoslavia. He again parachuted into Chetnik territory, near the village of Pranjani, where there were several hundred American airmen rescued by Chetnik forces and hidden from the Germans. Musulin successfully commanded the airlift Operation Halyard, the rescue from the air of about 447 U.S. airmen from Nazi-occupied Yugoslavia, from 10 to 29 August 1944. Although this operation was successful due to cooperation from General Mihailović, Musulin had been ordered not to give the Chetniks political promises, an order he violated when he allowed members of General Mihailović's political mission to board the plane. At this time the British were the main Allied authority in the Mediterranean, and their Special Operations Executive (SOE) complained to Musulin's superiors in the OSS, who decided to expel him from the service. In late 1944 Musulin was transferred to the Far East as part of the naval intelligence service, where he stayed until the end of the war.

== Post-war years ==
After the war, the CIA conducted its own investigation into Musulin, which concluded that he had acted appropriately and that he had been the victim of James Klugmann and other British agents in the SOE with communist sympathies. For his efforts, Musulin was awarded the Legion of Merit.

Musulin enlisted in the Office of Naval Intelligence and joined the Central Intelligence Agency in 1950, where he remained until he retired in 1974. Musulin continued to serve as a field operations officer. He was part of a team that was responsible for recruiting and training Cuban exiles to fight against the regime of Fidel Castro. He was disappointed with the failure of the Bay of Pigs Invasion and the loss of human life.

Musulin died of complications of diabetes at the age of 72.

== See also ==
- Operation Halyard
