= Pranjani =

- Town
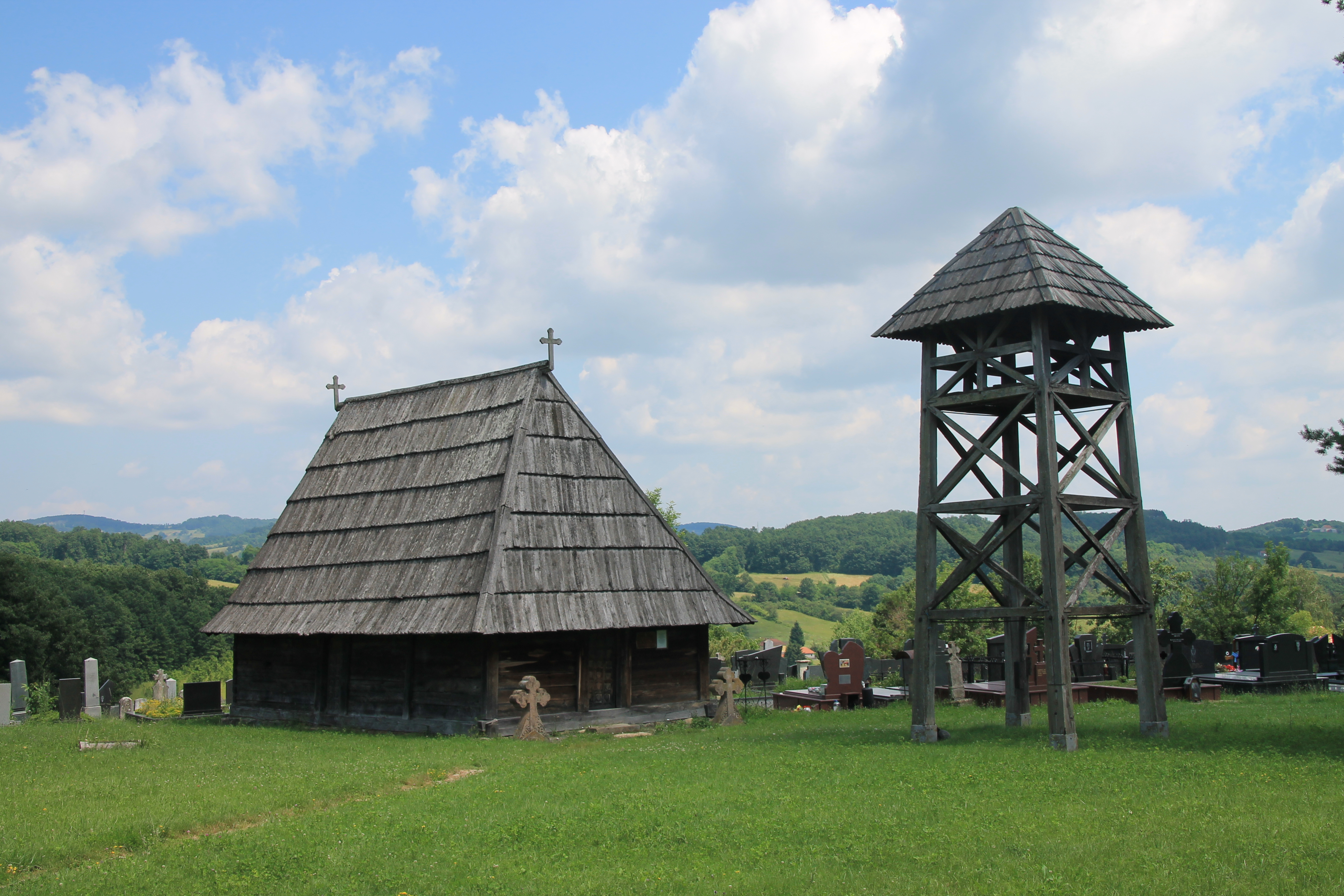
- Wooden church in village Pranjani from 1827

- Location within Serbia
- Coordinates: 43°59′06″N 20°12′42″E
- Country: Serbia
- District: Moravica District
- Municipality: Gornji Milanovac
- Time zone: UTC+1 (CET)
  - Summer (DST): UTC+2 (CEST)

Pranjani is a village in the municipality of Gornji Milanovac, Serbia. In 1944, it was the site of Operation Halyard.

The village was active in the Serbian Revolution, being organized into the knežina (administrative unit) of Brusnica (Takovo) during the First Serbian Uprising (1804–13). Among notable local revolutionaries were Blagoje, Todor Jeremić and Nika Milosavljević.

In 2019, a small wooden guest house was transferred by truck to a new location, in the churchyard, where it is planned to be reconstructed as part of traditional folk architecture. This was a big event for the local inhabitants, especially for the youngest. During 2020, the wooden church and a small guest house were reconstructed and conserved.

== Gallery ==
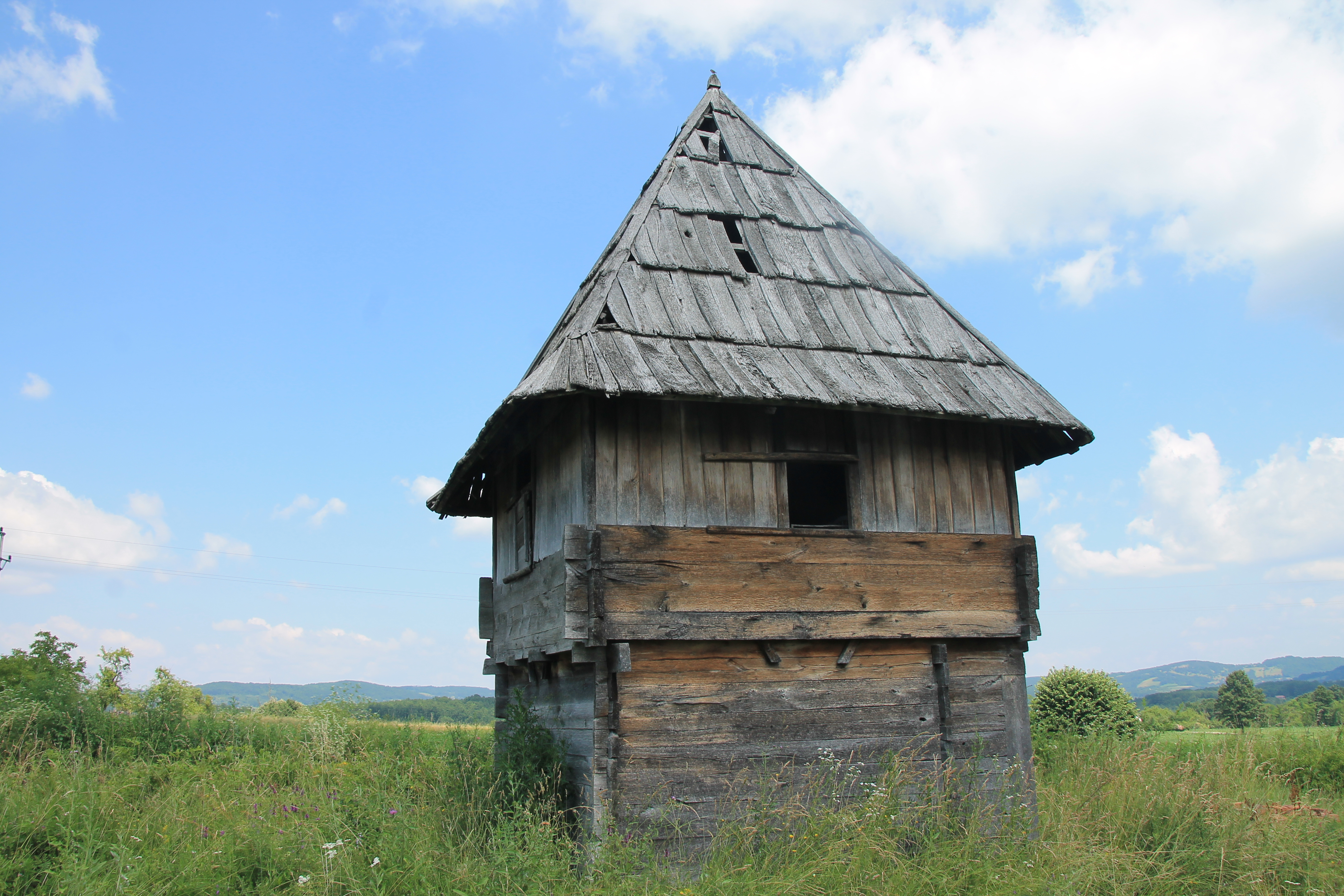
Small guest house with a room upstairs from mid-19th century

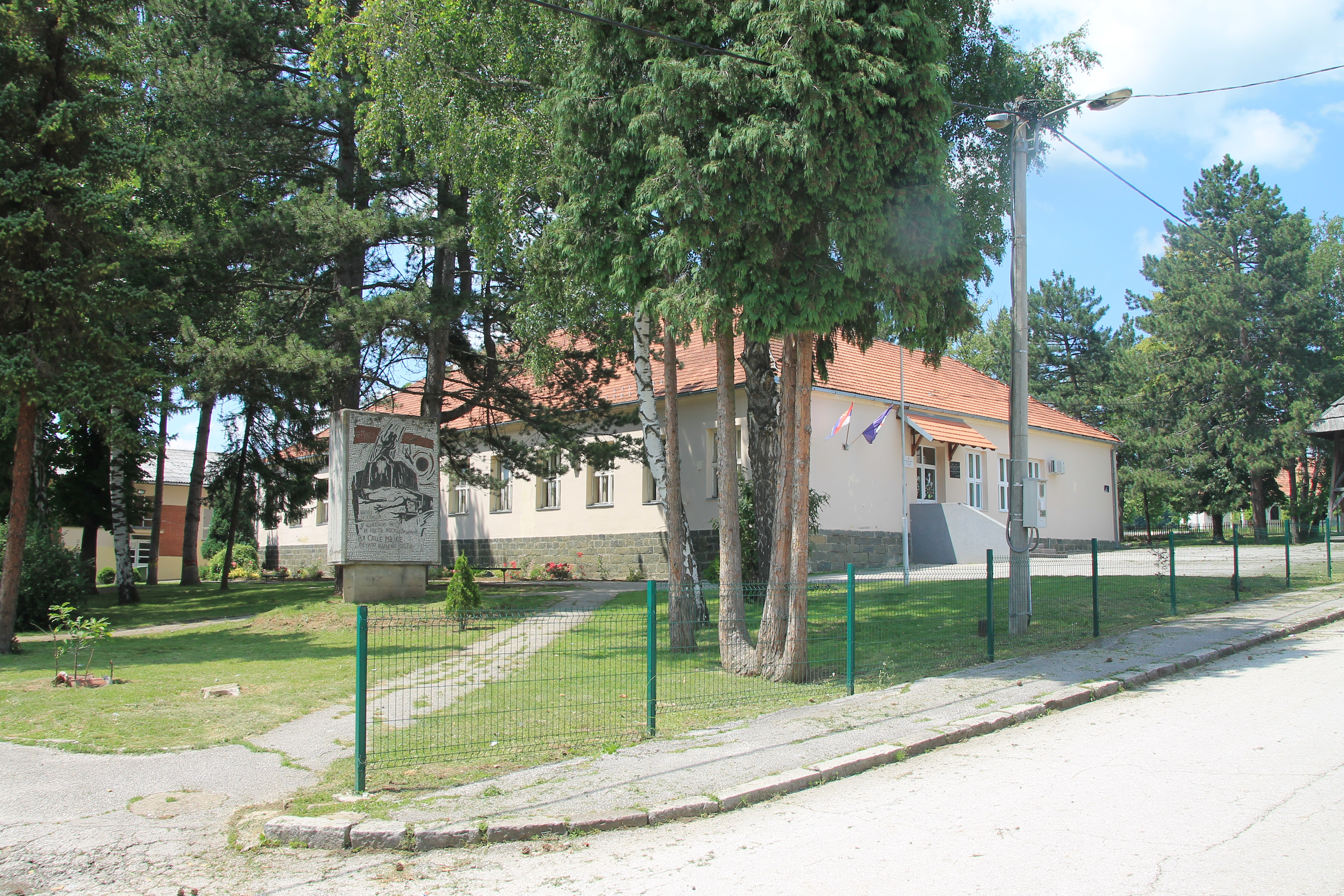
Elementary school
