= Momčilo Đujić =

Chetnik military commander (1907–1999)

Vojvoda Momčilo Đujić
- Момчило Ђујић
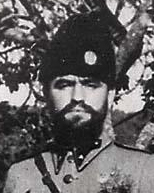
- Đujić between 1941 and 1943
- Born: 27 February 1907; Kovačić, Dalmatia, Austria-Hungary
- Died: 11 September 1999 (aged 92); San Diego, California, US
- Military career
- Allegiance: Chetnik Association (1935–1941); Chetniks (1941–1945); Italy (1941–1943); Government of National Salvation (1942–1944); Germany (1943–1945)
- Service years: 1935–1945
- Rank: Vojvoda
- Nickname: Father Fire
- Commands: Chetnik movement in northern Dalmatia; Dinara Division
- Conflicts: World War II in Yugoslavia
- Other work: Ravna Gora Movement of Serbian Chetniks

Signature
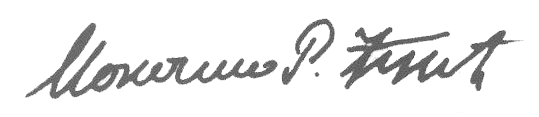

Momčilo Đujić (Note: Often spelled Momcilo Djujic in English-language sources.) (Serbo-Croatian Cyrillic: Момчилo Ђујић, pronounced [mǒmtʃiːlo dʑûːjitɕ]; 27 February 1907 – 11 September 1999) was a Serbian Orthodox priest and Chetnik vojvoda. He led a significant proportion of the Chetniks within the northern Dalmatia and western Bosnia regions of the Independent State of Croatia (NDH), a fascist puppet state created from parts of the occupied Kingdom of Yugoslavia during World War II. In this role he collaborated extensively with the Italian and then the German occupying forces against the communist-led Partisan insurgency.

Đujić was ordained as a priest in 1933 and gained a reputation as something of a firebrand in the pulpit. After the assassination of King Alexander of Yugoslavia in 1934, he joined the Chetnik Association of Kosta Pećanac, forming several bands in the Knin region of Dalmatia. The Chetnik Association became a reactionary force used by the central government to oppress the populace. Active in promoting workers' rights, Đujić was briefly jailed for leading a protest by railroad workers, and he was a member of the exclusively-Serb Agrarian Union political party.

After the Axis invasion of Yugoslavia in April 1941, the Croatian Ustaše regime implemented a policy of widespread incarcerations, massacres, forced emigration and murder of Serbs and other groups, but Đujić escaped to the coastal zone annexed by Italy and began recruiting Chetniks in a refugee camp. When a general uprising began in August, Đujić returned to Knin and deployed his Chetniks to defend local Serbs from the Ustaše, and under his command they captured the town of Drvar in the Bosanska Krajina. He then quickly began collaborating with the Italians, gaining their help through signing a non-aggression agreement. At this time, he was still aligned with the insurgency led by the communists. He soon betrayed them and began subverting Partisan units and attacking them alongside the Italians. He formed the Chetnik Dinara Division in early 1942. By mid-1942, Đujić was encouraging his Chetniks to co-operate with NDH forces, and on 1 October Chetniks under his command perpetrated a massacre of nearly 100 Croat civilians in the village of Gata. In early 1943 he attempted to participate on the Axis side in the Operation Weiss campaign against the Partisans but this was blocked by the Germans. In August, the Dinara Division suffered significantly at the hands of the Partisans and through desertion. By the time of the Italian capitulation in September it was of little use for offensive operations. When the Germans occupied the area, they restricted it to guarding railway tracks from Partisan sabotage. By November 1943, the Chetnik supreme commander, Draža Mihailović, was ordering Đujić to collaborate with the Germans. In November 1944, Đujić and 4,500 of his Chetniks combined with German and NDH forces in an attempt to defend Knin from the ascendant Partisans. Đujić progressively withdrew his troops until they surrendered to the western Allies in May 1945.

Đujić was tried and convicted in absentia for war crimes by the new Yugoslav communist government, which found him guilty of mass murder, torture, rape, robbery, forcible confinement and collaborating with the occupying forces. Included in these charges was responsibility for the deaths of 1,500 people. He eventually emigrated to the United States, settling in California. He played an important role in Serbian émigré circles and founded the Ravna Gora Movement of Serbian Chetniks alongside other exiled Chetnik fighters. He later retired to San Marcos, California. In 1989, Đujić appointed the ultranationalist Serb politician Vojislav Šešelj as a Chetnik vojvoda. He later stated that he regretted awarding the title to Šešelj due to his involvement with Slobodan Milošević and his Socialist Party. In 1998, Biljana Plavšić, then President of Republika Srpska, presented Đujić with an honorary award. Plavšić was later convicted of crimes against humanity related to her activities during the Bosnian War. Đujić died at a hospice in San Diego in 1999, aged 92. Moves in Serbia to rehabilitate the reputations of Đujić and the Chetnik movement have been criticised as historical revisionism and falsification of history.

== Early life, education and priesthood ==
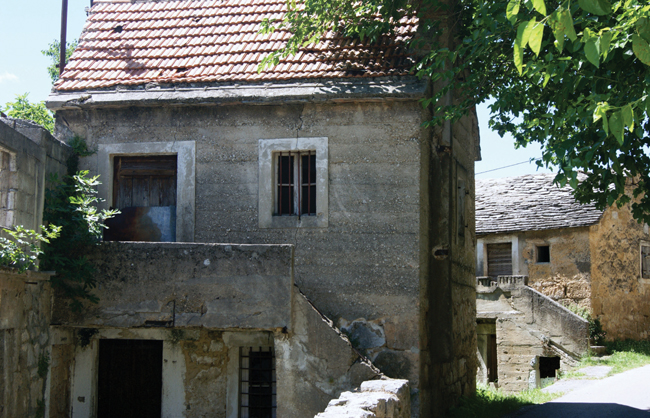
The house in which Đujić was born

Momčilo Đujić was the oldest of three sons and two daughters of Rade Đujić and his wife Ljubica (née Miloš), and was born in the village of Kovačić, near Knin in the Kingdom of Dalmatia, on 27 February 1907. The family was of Bosnian origin. Rade had moved to Kovačić with his disabled Austro-Hungarian Army veteran father, Glišo, and his brother, Nikola, in the late 1880s and lived off his father's army pension for a time. Ljubica hailed from the village of Ljubač, southeast of Knin. Shortly after his marriage to Ljubica, Rade established himself as a successful farmer.

Đujić's mother wished to name him Simo, after his uncle. Đujić's father disliked the name and, having been raised listening to the traditional Balkan gusle – a single-string musical instrument, and reciting Serbian epic poetry, named his son after Momchil, a 14th-century brigand in the service of Serbian Emperor Dušan the Mighty. It was not until Momčilo started primary school in 1914 that his mother discovered that he had not been named Simo at his baptism. Đujić finished primary school in 1918 and graduated as the best student in his class. Between 1920 and 1924, he attended lower gymnasium in Knin. After a two-year pause, he began attending the higher gymnasium in Šibenik, but in 1929 decided to leave for Sremski Karlovci, where he would attend the Serbian Orthodox seminary. He graduated from the seminary in 1931. In the same year he published a poetry book, Emiilijade. He was ordained a priest two years later. In 1931, Đujić was assigned to the Orthodox parish in Strmica, near Kovačić. Shortly before ordination, he married Zorka Dobrijević-Jundžić, the eldest daughter of a wealthy merchant from Bosansko Grahovo. The two were married in the Church of St. George in Knin, where Đujić had been baptised as an infant. Đujić's first child, Siniša, was born in 1934. In 1935, Zorka gave birth to twins, a son named Radomir and a daughter named Radojka.

Đujić and his family were relatively wealthy by the standards of Depression-era Kingdom of Yugoslavia. Đujić consequently became the most influential person in the village. He sought to use his money and influence to help the Serb peasants in the Dalmatian hinterland. In 1934, he organised the construction of the "Petar Mrkonjić" cultural centre in Strmica, financed and oversaw the irrigation of farmland west of Mračaj and approved the casting of a pair of church bells on the Church of St. John the Baptist. The casting of new church bells – the originals having been destroyed by Austro-Hungarian artillery in 1916 – was financed with money donated by the Yugoslav government and further improved his reputation among the local population. Đujić's critics accused him of misappropriating funds, which he denied from the pulpit.

== Interwar Chetnik Association ==
In October 1934, Vlado Chernozemski assassinated Yugoslavia's King Alexander. Đujić was chosen to stand by Alexander's coffin as the funeral train travelled through Knin. On this occasion, he met the future World War II Chetnik leader Draža Mihailović for the first and only time. The king's assassination was partially orchestrated by the Ustaše, a Croatian terrorist organisation at the time. Soon after this, Đujić began carrying arms and organising Serb paramilitary groups in and around Knin. "I knew that the country would not survive", Đujić explained, "because nobody can put Serbs and Croats in the same bag". In late 1934, he met with Kosta Pećanac, the head of the interwar Chetnik Association, and formed eleven Chetnik bands in the vicinity of the town. Chetnik insurgency did not have a long tradition in Dalmatia, and only emerged in the 1930s. Đujić subjected local Serbs to constant propaganda, hoping that it would convince them to join the Chetniks. Most ignored his appeals, and continued living peacefully with their Croat neighbours.

On 9 January 1935, Đujić, with a carbine slung over his back, presided over a gathering of twenty newly recruited Chetniks in the village of Sveti Štefan, just north of Knin, together with gendarmerie Brigadni đeneral Ljubo Novaković and one of Pećanac's deputies who brought Chetnik and Sokol insignia from Belgrade. The gathering was held in full view of the villagers, and marked the first time that Đujić publicly donned a Chetnik uniform. On 6 September 1935, Đujić formed a Chetnik organisation in Vrlika. Several months later, he assembled a band of 70 Chetniks in the villages of Otrić and Velika Popina. By this time the Chetnik organisation had transformed from the popular Serb guerrilla bands of the Balkan Wars and World War I into a reactionary force that was used by the central government to oppress the populace.

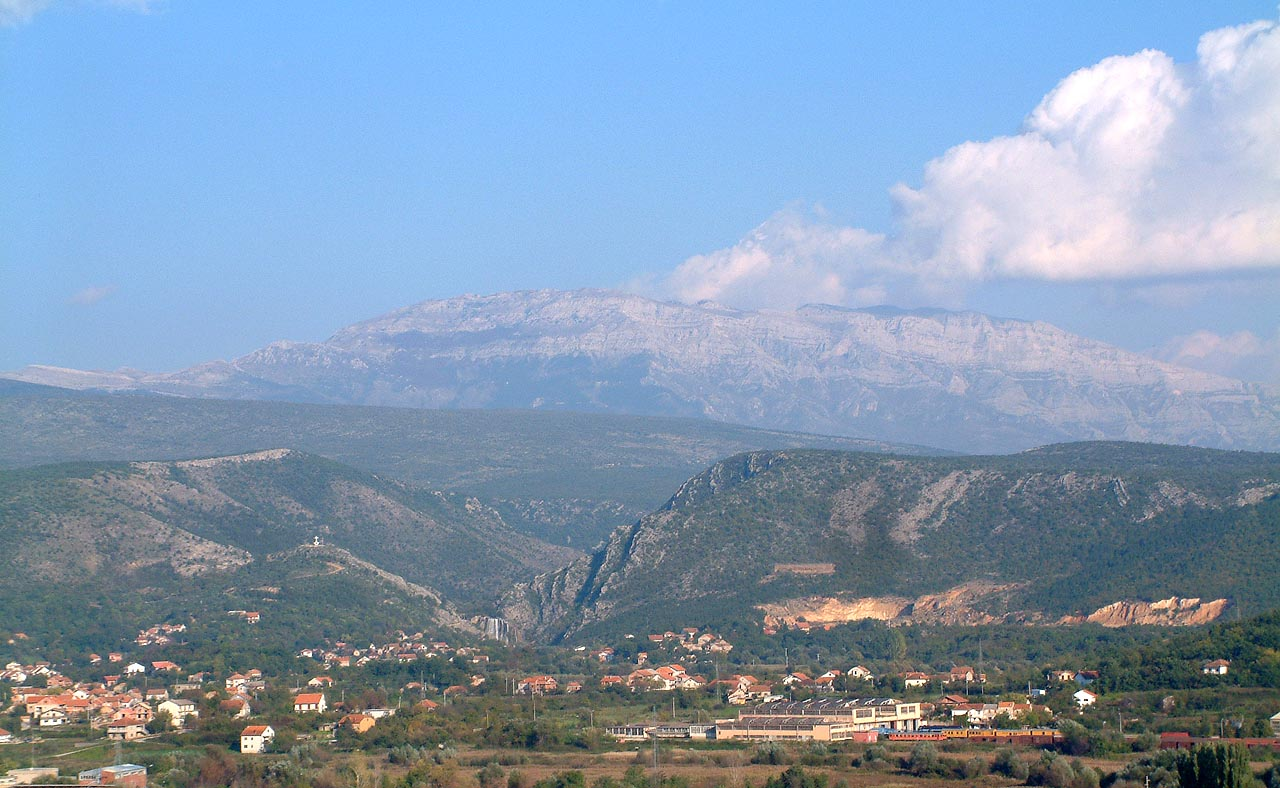
Mount Dinara and the Knin countryside

Đujić became known for his fiery speeches, which earned him the nickname "Father Fire" (Serbian: Pop vatra). The tone of his speeches changed depending on the course of political developments in Yugoslavia, and his statements ranged from right-wing royalism to left-wing progressivism. At certain points, Đujić appeared to embrace the quasi-fascism of the leader of the Yugoslav National Movement, Dimitrije Ljotić. At others, he strongly propagated conservative Chetnik ideology and Serb chauvinism. Đujić's repeated calls for democracy and national rights prompted the regency of Prince Paul to brand him a "left-wing agitator". He received considerable support from the Serbian Orthodox Church in Knin. He also used his position as a priest and respected local leader to influence how the people of Strmica would vote, instructing his parishioners to cast ballots for a candidate of his choosing in the 1935 Yugoslav parliamentary elections.

In May 1937, Đujić gave a sermon in which he accused the Yugoslav government of being responsible for the poor working conditions of railroad workers in Dalmatia and western Bosnia. In mid-May, Đujić led a massive strike between Bihać and Knin in which more than 10,000 railroad workers participated. The Una–Butužnica railroad was one of eight being built in Yugoslavia by two French civil engineering companies, Société de Construction des Batignolles and Société Edmond Bayer de Agner. Đujić wished to minimise the influence that the communist-dominated United Workers Syndicate Union of Yugoslavia held over the workforce in Dalmatia, and presented himself as a man out to defend the rights of workers throughout the country. The strike began on 15 May, on the Srb–Dugopolje road. After three days, it was broken up by the Yugoslav gendarmerie. Đujić then led the striking workers south to Vrpolje, where he attempted to negotiate a deal with the authorities. After negotiations broke down, Đujić led the workers north to Strmica, via Golubić and Pileći kuk. He held a large rally at Pileći kuk – which was attended by a crowd of over 800 people – and delivered a speech criticising the regency for its "pro-[Roman] Catholic, anti-[Eastern] Orthodox and anti-worker" policies. An eyewitness reported that Đujić waved "a red [communist] flag and greeted followers with a clenched fist, all while being the leader of a Chetnik band." In Knin, Đujić and the striking workers clashed with police. The police fired on the protesters, wounding three and killing a young girl who was watching the clash. Đujić was subsequently arrested and spent ten days in prison for "insulting His Majesty" during the rally at Pileći kuk.

He later received financial compensation from the Yugoslav government for the "spiritual suffering and pain" caused by his brief period of detention. Đujić's actions greatly enhanced his reputation among Dalmatian peasants, who referred to him as a "brave leader of working men". The local authorities continued to view Đujić with suspicion, describing him as a "priest of left-wing democracy" in internal documents. Unsubstantiated rumours circulated that Đujić supported Ljotić's organisation, and that he was one of the few people that had voted for Ljotić in the 1938 Yugoslav parliamentary elections. The local authorities suspected that Đujić was an "old Italian spy" who received orders from the Italian intelligence headquarters in Zadar, but never uncovered any evidence to substantiate these suspicions. Before World War II, Đujić was a member of the exclusively-Serb Agrarian Union political party.

The historians Popović, Lolić and Latas observe that Đujić's espoused political views appear to be wildly inconsistent during the interwar period, but they ascribe this to his willingness to do anything to achieve power and wealth, including embracing the populism of opposing the Yugoslav state. Despite this apparent inconsistency, they also detect an underlying theme of Great Serb chauvinism in his actions throughout the period leading up to the war.

== World War II ==
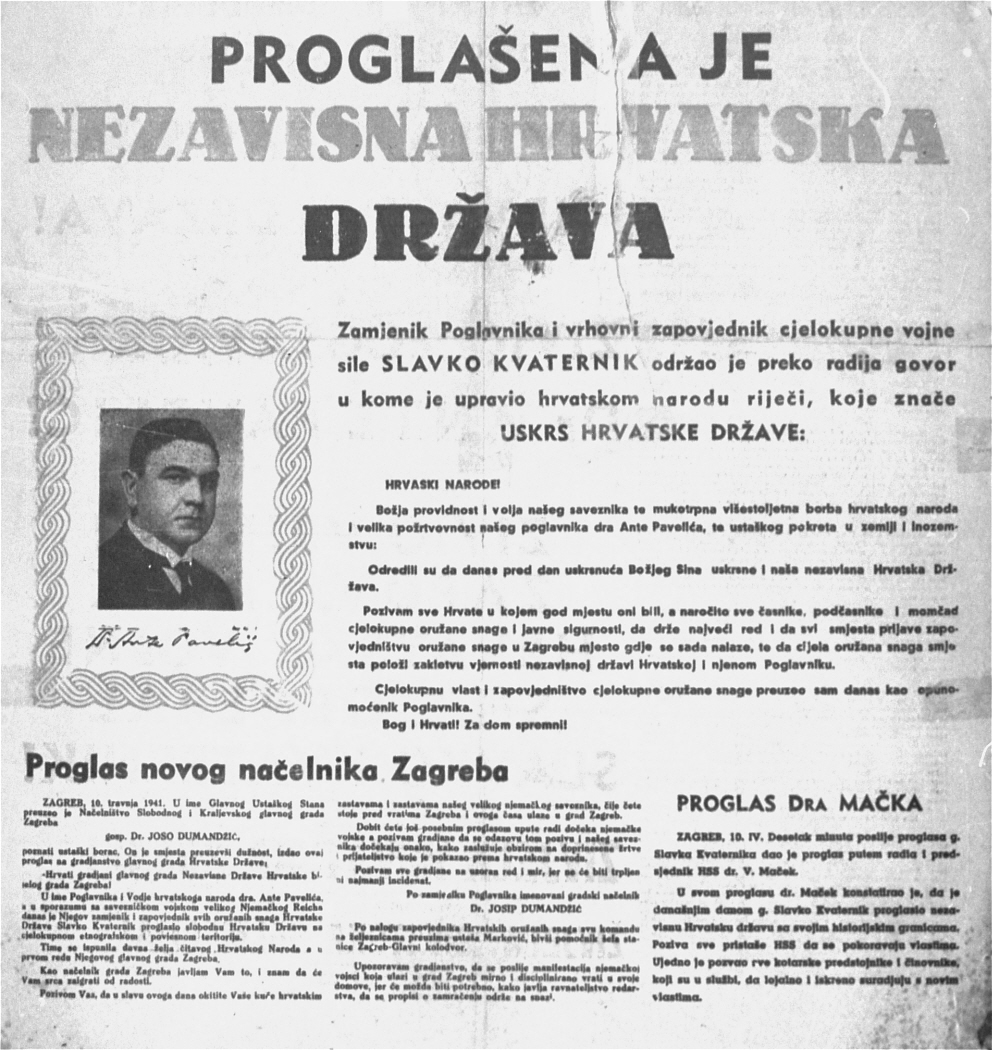
The official proclamation of the Independent State of Croatia, 10 April 1941

Following the 1938 annexation of Austria by Nazi Germany, Yugoslavia shared a border with the Third Reich and came under increasing pressure as her neighbours became aligned with the Axis powers. In April 1939, Yugoslavia gained a second frontier with Italy when that country invaded and occupied neighbouring Albania. At the outbreak of World War II, the Yugoslav government declared its neutrality. Between September and November 1940, Hungary and Romania joined the Axis, and Italy invaded Greece from Albania. From that time, Yugoslavia was almost completely surrounded by Axis powers and their satellites, and her neutral stance toward the war came under tremendous pressure. In late February 1941, Bulgaria joined the Axis. The next day, German troops entered Bulgaria from Romania, almost closing the ring around Yugoslavia. With the aim of securing his southern flank before the pending attack on the Soviet Union, Adolf Hitler began placing heavy pressure on Yugoslavia to join the Axis powers. The Yugoslav government conditionally signed the Tripartite Pact – the instrument that constituted the Axis – after some delay, on 25 March 1941. Two days later, a group of pro-Western Serb-nationalist air force officers deposed Prince Paul in a bloodless coup d'état. The conspirators declared 17-year-old Prince Peter of age and brought to power a government of national unity led by General Dušan Simović. The coup enraged Hitler, who ordered the invasion of Yugoslavia which commenced on 6 April 1941.

Đujić did not support the coup. He realised that Yugoslavia's collapse was inevitable after seeing a column of demoralised troops from the barely mobilised 12th Infantry Division Jadranska pass his home. Once it became clear that the Royal Yugoslav Army (Serbo-Croatian: Vojska Kraljevine Jugoslavije, VKJ) could not hold the Axis advance, Đujić started blaming Croat fifth column activity for the VKJ's military defeats. On 10 April 1941, the Ustaše-led Independent State of Croatia (Croatian: Nezavisna Država Hrvatska, NDH) was proclaimed in Zagreb and divided into German and Italian zones of occupation. The Italians divided those parts of the NDH that they occupied into three zones: Zone I was those parts of Dalmatia that were annexed by Italy and formed the Governorate of Dalmatia; Zone II was an area which was demilitarised in respect of NDH forces, but was under NDH civil administration; and Zone III was the remainder up to the demarcation line with the Germans. This arrangement was implemented following the signing of the Treaties of Rome on 18 May. Following the signing, the Italians withdrew the bulk of their forces from Zones II and III, and those that remained there were formally considered to be allied forces stationed on NDH territory by mutual agreement. Strmica and Knin were included in the NDH and fell within Zone II.

=== Collaboration agreements with the Italians ===
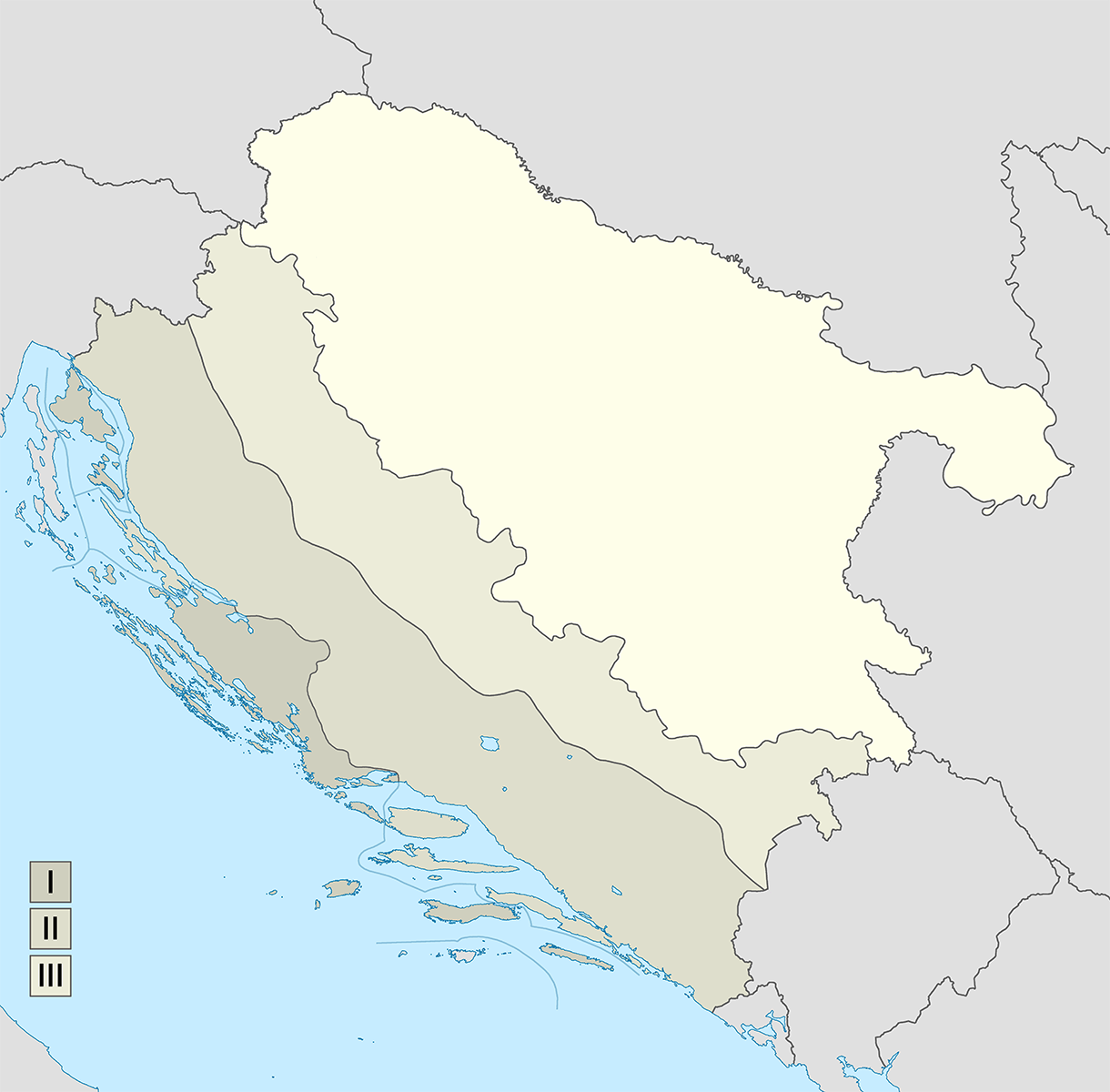
Map of the NDH showing the three Italian zones of occupation
- dark grey for Zone I
- mid-grey for Zone II
- light grey for Zone III
The locations of Knin and Drvar are also marked.

Đujić's emergence as a Chetnik leader in the region around Knin was rapid. Commencing in April 1941, the Ustaše implemented a policy of widespread incarcerations, massacres, forced emigration, and murder of Serbs within the territory they controlled. Around this time, Đujić's Chetniks began killing and mutilating Croat civilians. According to Italian reports, Đujić had around 300 Chetniks under his command in April, centered mainly around Knin. The first Ustaše atrocity in the Knin area occurred on 29 May, when a group of Serbs were killed. Around the same time, a group of Ustaše surrounded Strmica with the aim of capturing Đujić, but he was forewarned and escaped to Kistanje in Zone I where he sought Italian protection. Between late May and 27 July, the Ustaše killed more than 500 Serbs in the Knin district. On 13 July, the Ustaše ordered the arrest of all Serbian Orthodox priests in the district and the confiscation of their property, but Đujić was already beyond their reach. While the Italians generally stood by as the Ustaše committed atrocities, they did open up the border crossings into the Governorate of Dalmatia for Serbs fleeing the Ustaše. Refugees from Knin and nearby regions were taken into Italian-run camps located in Split, Obrovac, Benkovac, Kistanje and Šibenik. Đujić was a principal organiser within the Kistanje camp, which held around 1,500 refugees, and from mid-July was recruiting among them for the Chetnik cause.

Once a general uprising against the Ustaše had begun in August, Đujić went to the centre of the revolt in Drvar with another Chetnik leader and sought approval from the leadership of the uprising to take leadership of the rebellion in the Knin region. Đujić then established his Chetniks around Knin and coordinated with Chetniks in the Bosansko Grahovo district. Đujić's Chetniks successfully kept the Ustaše out of Knin and its surroundings, sparing the local Serb population from further massacres. As summer approached, Đujić's Chetniks captured Drvar from the Ustaše. By early summer, he and Chetnik commander Stevo Rađenović had contacted the Italians and asked them to put a halt to the Ustaše mistreatment of Serbs, enable the return of Serb refugees, and repeal a decree that enabled the confiscation of Serb-owned property in the NDH. The Italians obliged in the hope that doing so would win the Chetniks over to collaboration and seriously weaken any future uprising in the area, which would have further disrupted rail traffic along the Split–Karlovac railway line. On 13 August, at a meeting in the village of Pađene northwest of Knin, Đujić and several other Serb nationalists agreed to collaborate with the Italians. They secretly signed a pact of non-aggression with the Italian military, and in exchange, the Italians approved Đujić raising a force of up to 3,000 Chetniks. On 31 August, at a Drvar assembly, Đujić was given the task of stopping the Italian advance on the town. Immediately afterwards, he made an agreement with the Italians granting them free passage. Recruiting for Chetnik formations in the region was assisted by the so-called leftist errors of the Yugoslav Partisans, which drove undecided Serbs to join the Chetniks.

=== Dinara Division ===
==== 1942 ====
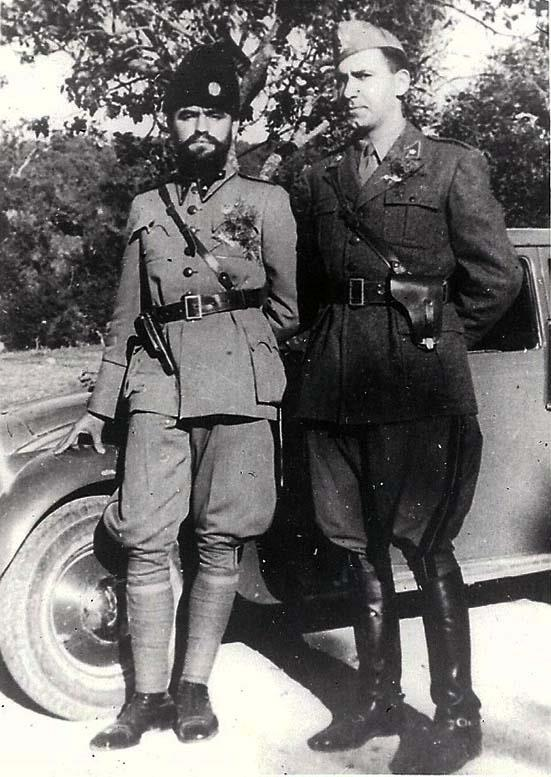
Đujić (left) with an Italian officer

In early January 1942, the Dinara Division was formed after Đujić was contacted by Mihailović, via a courier. Under Mihailović's putative control, Ilija Trifunović-Birčanin played a central role in organising the units of Chetnik leaders in western Bosnia, Lika, and northern Dalmatia into the Dinara Division and dispatched former Royal Yugoslav Army officers to help. Đujić was designated the commander of the division with a goal of the "establishment of a Serb national state" in which "an exclusively Orthodox population is to live". At the time of its formation, the division was no more than 1,500 strong. The headquarters of the Dinara Division was located in Knin.

In mid-April, Đujić fomented a pro-Chetnik coup in a Partisan unit in the Gračac district northwest of Knin, which was part of a pattern of subversive Chetnik activity in the Knin region at the time. Around the same time Đujić's Chetniks were launching raids against villages held by the Partisans between Bosansko Grahovo and Drvar in conjunction with the Italians, who considered him a filibuster. He operated in northern Dalmatia under Trifunović-Birčanin who acted as liaison officer between the Chetniks and the Italians, and whose collaboration agreements were condoned by Mihailović. In June, Đujić was appointed as a Chetnik warlord (Serbo-Croatian: vojvoda, војвода) by Mihailović. By the summer of 1942, Đujić's Chetniks had effectively become Italian auxiliaries, and they began providing Chetnik detachments with arms, ammunition and supplies. It is likely that the agreements between Đujić and the Italians were negotiated without Mihailović's prior knowledge. They were later denounced by Mihailović.

In mid-May, Đujić was a member of a Chetnik delegation that approached the Ustaše civil administration in the Knin region, and discussed joint action against the increasing threat from the Partisans. The Chetniks were given funds amounting to 100,000 kuna and arrangements were made for them to co-locate units with NDH forces and to receive food from the Ustaše authorities. On 28 June, as a gathering in the village of Kosovo near Knin, Đujić urged his Chetniks to be loyal to the NDH. In this way, Đujić and other Chetnik leaders established co-operation with the Ustaše, although according to the political scientist Sabrina P. Ramet, these relationships were "based only on their common fear of the Partisans" and "characterised by distrust and uncertainty". Đujić actively co-operated with Italian forces, with whom he had concluded a non-aggression pact. On 1 October, Italian units, accompanied by units of the Dinara Division under the command of Đujić, Mane Rokvić and Veljko Ilijić conducted an operation in and around the village of Gata near Split. During the operation, the Chetniks killed 95–96 Croats, mostly women, children and the elderly, then burned most of the village. According to the journalist Tim Judah, about 200 Croats were killed, and the actions of the Chetniks at Gata outraged the Italians. In the same month Đujić told his men "we Chetniks have to be in good relations with the Croats for the time being in order to get a large number of arms and munitions, but when the time comes we will settle accounts with them". At the same time, while Đujić and fellow Chetnik leader Uroš Drenović were hoping to join forces in western Bosnia, the Partisans were in the ascendancy. In November, arrangements were made with the Italians for 3,000 Herzegovinian Chetniks to be transferred to the Knin region and Lika to prevent the destruction of the Dinara Division by the Partisans. This transfer was effected in mid-December.

==== 1943 ====
In early February 1943, Đujić and fellow Chetnik leader Petar Baćović tried to participate in the Axis Operation Weiss offensive against the Partisans but the Germans stopped them from getting involved. On 10 February, Đujić, Ilija Mihić, Baćović and Radovan Ivanišević, the Chetnik commanders of east Bosnia, Herzegovina, Dalmatia, and Lika, signed a joint proclamation declaring to the "people of Bosnia, Lika, and Dalmatia" that "since we have cleansed Serbia, Montenegro, and Herzegovina, we have come to help to crush the pitiful remnants of the Communist international, criminal band of Tito, Moša Pijade, Levi Vajnert and other paid Jews". The Partisan rank and file was called upon to "kill the political commissars and join our ranks right away," like the "hundreds and hundreds who are surrendering every day, conscious that they have been betrayed and swindled by the Communist Jews." By 17 February, it was clear that the Chetniks in western Bosnia, including Đujić's Dinara Division, had failed to use Operation Weiss to recapture Drvar and unite the Chetnik forces in the Dinaric Alps and western Bosnia.

Following the death of Trifunović-Birčanin in February 1943, Đujić, along with Dobroslav Jevđević, Baćović, and Ivanišević vowed to the Italians to carry on Trifunović-Birčanin's policies of closely collaborating with them against the Partisans. By March, detachments of the Dinara Division were refusing to budge from the localities in which they had been recruited, would not carry out mobile operations, and according to the Italians, "were good for little else but plunder". By April, difficulties had arisen between Mihailović's delegates and civilian Chetnik leaders like Đujić, to the extent that Mihailović's delegate told Đujić to avoid interaction with the Italians unless Mihailović had given prior approval. Despite these orders, Mihailović's delegates never achieved control of all of the civilian Chetnik leaders like Đujić.

In late May, Đujić and the other long-term civilian collaborationist Chetnik leaders in the region suffered a severe setback when the Italian leader, Benito Mussolini, acquiesced to German demands and ordered the commander of the Italian Second Army, Generale di Corpo d'Armata (Lieutenant General) Mario Robotti, to coordinate with the Germans in the disarming of Chetnik detachments. Đujić prevailed upon Robotti to intercede with the Germans, and in June was granted a reprieve when the German Commander-in-Chief South-East Europe, Generaloberst Alexander Löhr, agreed that Đujić's Chetniks could be disarmed gradually, or in a few months time. At the same time as this was agreed, the Italian XVIII Army Corps were ordered to progressively reduce the supplies of food provided to the Dinara Division.

Throughout the summer, Đujić's Chetniks fought the Partisans in western Bosnia, but by early August they had suffered severe reverses at the hands of the Partisans around Bosansko Grahovo and had to withdraw from that area. Around the same time, one of Mihailović's delegates, Mladen Žujović, reported that the Dinara Division was "poorly formed, badly armed and disciplined", did not have "accurate registers of officers and troops", and could muster no more than 3,000 men. Žujović concluded his report by stating that the division was a "figment of the imagination". Mihailović's delegate in western Bosnia, Đuro Plećaš, was killed in August after he clashed with Đujić. Around the middle of the month, Đujić and other Chetnik leaders approached the Italians and admitted that Mihailović had directed them to disarm Italian units in case of an Italian capitulation to the Allies. They promised that they would not carry out these orders. By late August, German pressure, reduced Italian supplies and the fighting against the Partisans was resulting in increased defections to the Partisans and was also undermining Đujić's position as leader. Around the same time, Đujić narrowly escaped arrest by the Italians, and thanks to an intervention by Robotti, also avoided arrest by the Germans.

Despite these difficulties, Đujić's detachments in Dalmatia and western Bosnia were used by the Italians almost up to the point of their surrender. Just before the Italian surrender, in an attempt to shore up Italian support, Đujić travelled to XVIII Army Corps headquarters in Knin to assure the Italians of his "sincere friendship and cooperation with the Italian people", but at this point the Italians were incapable of developing a coherent policy towards the Chetniks. By this time, Đujić's detachments had rapidly declined in military value and were of little use for offensive operations.

Following the Italian capitulation on 8 September, the Germans moved quickly to secure the Adriatic coastline ahead of a feared Allied landing, and Đujić's detachments tried unsuccessfully to slow their deployment through sabotage. Late that month, Đujić fled to avoid arrest by the Germans. In western Bosnia, many members of the Dinara Division had already transferred their allegiance to the Partisans or deserted. The remainder began collaborating with the Germans as early as October, although they did not number more than a few thousand. In mid-October, Đujić managed to persuade the Germans to withdraw their arrest order. Nevertheless, the Germans were less supportive of his Chetniks than the Italians had been, did not trust them in large-scale actions, and restricted their activities to guarding railway tracks between Knin and the Adriatic coast from Partisan sabotage.

The Germans required all members of the Dinara Division to produce their German-issued identification passes to receive arms and munitions, and eschewed a written agreement with Đujić. His new situation was in stark contrast to the advantageous position he had enjoyed when dealing with the Italians, and the activities of the Dinara Division were strictly controlled, including a prohibition against undertaking operations in areas populated by Croats. The Germans had intercepted his radio communications with Mihailović in September, which meant that his reported strength and intentions were known to the Germans, and further undermined his attempts to gain greater freedom of action. On 19 or 20 November 1943, Mihailović ordered Đujić to collaborate with the Germans, adding that he himself was unable to openly do so "because of public opinion." By the end of December, Đujić began to develop links with Ljotić's Yugoslav National Movement in German-occupied Serbia. Đujić also began to actively circumvent Mihailović's influence by sending him false information.

==== Retreat and surrender ====
In February 1944, Đujić ordered his commanders to infiltrate the Partisans with the aim of engaging in sabotage and assassination. Đujić said of the Dinara Division that it was:

... under Draža's command, but we received news and supplies for our struggle from Ljotić and [leader of the puppet government in occupied Serbia, [Milan] Nedić. ... Nedić's couriers reached me in Dinara and mine reached him in Belgrade. He sent me military uniforms for the guardists of the Dinara Chetnik Division; he sent me ten million dinars to obtain for the fighters whatever was needed and whatever could be obtained.

On 25 November 1944, the Yugoslav Partisans attacked the town of Knin, which was defended by 14,000 German troops, 4,500 of Đujić's Chetniks, and around 1,500 Ustaše. On 1 December, Đujić was wounded and sent an emissary to General Gustav Fehn of the German 264th Infantry Division in Knin with the following message:

The Chetnik Command with all of its armed forces has collaborated sincerely and loyally with the German Army in these areas from September last year. Our common interest demanded this. This collaboration has continued to the present day. ... The Chetnik Command wishes to share the destiny of the German Army in the future, too. ... The Command requests that [the village of] Pađene be the base for supplying our units, until a further common agreement is reached.

On 3 December 1944, Đujić's force of between 6,000 and 7,000 withdrew to Bihać with help from the Wehrmacht 373rd Infantry Division. The Chetniks received ammunition and food from the Germans and began a joint German-Chetnik offensive against the Partisans. Fehn organised the transportation of Đujić's wounded Chetniks through Zagreb to the Third Reich. Đujić requested a written guarantee from Ante Pavelić, leader of the NDH, to afford him and his forces refuge in German-occupied Slovenia. Ljotić and Nedić also petitioned to Nazi party official Hermann Neubacher in Vienna that Đujić's forces should be allowed passage, as did Slovene collaborationist General Leon Rupnik.

On 21 December 1944, Pavelić ordered the military forces of the NDH to give Đujić and his forces "orderly and unimpeded passage". Đujić and his 6,000-odd typhus-ridden Chetniks took an alternate route towards the Istrian peninsula, as the routes offered by Pavelić were not secure from Partisan attacks. Along the way, hundreds were lost to Ustaše attacks. When Đujić and his troops reached Slovenia in late December, his forces joined Jevđević's Chetniks, Ljotić's Serbian Volunteer Corps, and Nedić's Serbian Shock Corps, forming a single unit that was under the command of Odilo Globocnik, the Higher SS and Police Leader in the Adriatic Littoral. In January Đujić's men were disarmed by the Germans. Together, the collaborationist forces tried to contact the western Allies in Italy in an attempt to secure foreign aid for a proposed anti-Communist offensive to restore royalist Yugoslavia. Mihailović did not oppose this plan openly and even sent warm letters to Đujić during this period. In May 1945, Đujić surrendered his troops to Allied forces and they were then taken to southern Italy, from there to refugee camps in Germany and then dispersed.

== Life in exile ==
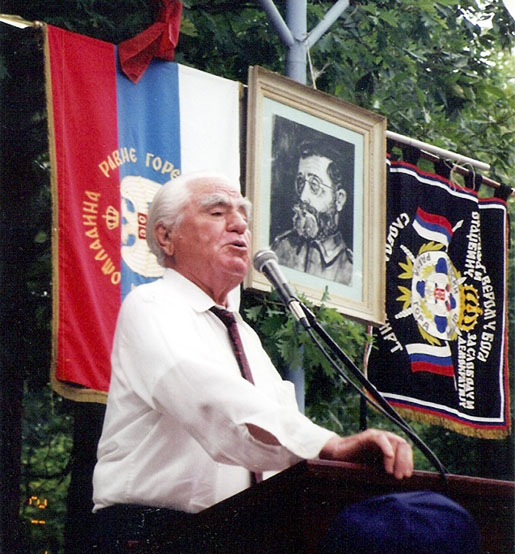
Đujić delivering a speech in Canada, 1991

In 1947, Đujić was tried and convicted of war crimes in absentia by Yugoslavia's communist government. He was found guilty of mass murder, torture, rape, robbery, and forcible confinement, as well as collaborating with the German and Italians. He was accused of being responsible for the deaths of 1,500 people over the course of the war. Between 1947 and 1949, Đujić lived in Paris, before emigrating to the United States. Many of his former Chetniks followed him. Following his arrival in the United States, Đujić and his fighters played a role in the foundation of the Ravna Gora Movement of Serbian Chetniks. He was very active among the Serbian diaspora and the Serbian Orthodox Church in North America. In the 1960s, he enraged some in the diaspora by supporting German, the Tito-approved Serbian patriarch, against the anti-communist American bishop Dionisije Milivojević. Nevertheless, he remained strongly opposed to Yugoslavia's communist government. Đujić retired to San Marcos, California. In 1988, the Yugoslav authorities unsuccessfully sought Đujić's extradition from the United States. By this time, Đujić was the oldest surviving leader of the wartime Chetniks.

On 28 June 1989, the 600th anniversary of the Battle of Kosovo, Đujić granted the title of vojvoda to Vojislav Šešelj. He further ordered him "to expel all Croats, Albanians, and other foreign elements from holy Serbian soil", stating he would return only when Serbia was cleansed of "the last Jew, Albanian, and Croat". Šešelj was at the time an anti-communist dissident. The writer and political analyst Paul Hockenos subsequently described Šešelj's activities in the Yugoslav Wars as those of "a man whose killer commando units operating in Croatia and Bosnia carried on the very worst of the Chetnik tradition." Šešelj later became the leader of the Serbian Radical Party, a government coalition partner of Serbian President Slobodan Milošević. In 1993, Đujić remarked: "[I condemn] Vojislav Šešelj who, by openly siding with the Socialist Party of Serbia, who are Communists who have only changed their name, has sullied the name of Chetnikdom and Serbian nationalism." In 1998, Đujić publicly stated that he regretted awarding the title to Šešelj. "I was naïve when I nominated Šešelj [as] vojvoda; I ask my people to forgive me," Đujić remarked. "The greatest gravedigger of Serbdom is Slobodan Milošević." Đujić considered Milošević the successor to Tito, and that he had compromised Serbian national rights within Yugoslavia.

According to the International Criminal Tribunal for the former Yugoslavia (ICTY) testimony of Croatian Serb leader Milan Babić, Đujić financially supported the Republic of Serbian Krajina in the 1990s with a donation of US$5,000. Đujić's wife died in 1995. In 1998, Biljana Plavšić, then President of Republika Srpska, presented an honorary award to Đujić. Plavšić was later indicted by the ICTY and convicted of crimes against humanity.

== Death and legacy ==
Đujić died on 11 September 1999 at a hospice in San Diego, California, aged 92. A New York Times obituary by the journalist David Binder stated that Đujić participated in "epic World War II battles" and carried out many "acts of wartime bravery." Editorial writer for The Washington Post, Benjamin Wittes, observed that the obituary only mentioned "in passing" the war crimes and collaboration accusations against Đujić, as well as his influence in the Yugoslav Wars. He concludes that Đujić "was no anti-fascist hero," and that he was an example of the dangers inherent in ultranationalism. The historian Marko Attila Hoare stated that Binder was known for his "admiration of Serb Nazi-collaborator Momčilo Đujić."

A commemoration marking six months since Đujić's death, organised by the Vojvoda Momčilo Đujić Dinara Chetnik Movement, was celebrated at St. Mark's Church in Belgrade in March 2000, and his death was commemorated again at the same church in 2012. The latter service was attended by Mladen Obradović, the leader of the far-right Serbian ultra-nationalist political party, Obraz. The Serbian diaspora in the United States set up a monument dedicated to Đujić at the Serbian cemetery in Libertyville, Illinois. The management and players of the football club Red Star Belgrade visited the monument on 23 May 2010. Darko Miličić – a former Serbian national basketball player who played in the NBA for ten years – has a tattoo of Đujić on his body.

Commemorations of the Gata massacre committed by Đujić's Chetniks on 1 October 1942 have been conducted in the recent past, including on the 75th anniversary in 2017, at which Blaženko Boban, a prefect of Split-Dalmatia County, represented the president of Croatia, Kolinda Grabar-Kitarović. A survivor of the massacre, Andrija Pivčević, who was eight years old at the time and was stabbed nine times by Chetniks, placed a wreath and a candle during the 2017 commemorative service. Pivčević testified about the massacre at Mihailović's trial in 1946. Several of those who spoke at the service decried the rehabilitation of Chetnik collaborators and war criminals in Serbia.

In 2021, Prvomajska (1st of May) Street, a busy thoroughfare in the Belgrade district of Zemun was renamed Father Momčilo Đujić Street. This action was condemned by Tomislav Žigmanov, the leader of the Democratic Alliance of Croats in Vojvodina – a political party in Serbia, and by the Serbian journalist Tomislav Marković in an opinion piece for Al Jazeera Balkans. Both decried the move as a continuation of the official rehabilitation of Serb World War II collaborators by Serbian authorities since 2004 via historical revisionism and falsification of history, which has even spread into school textbooks.
