= Gata massacre =

Massacre in Gata, Croatia

- Part of World War II in Yugoslavia
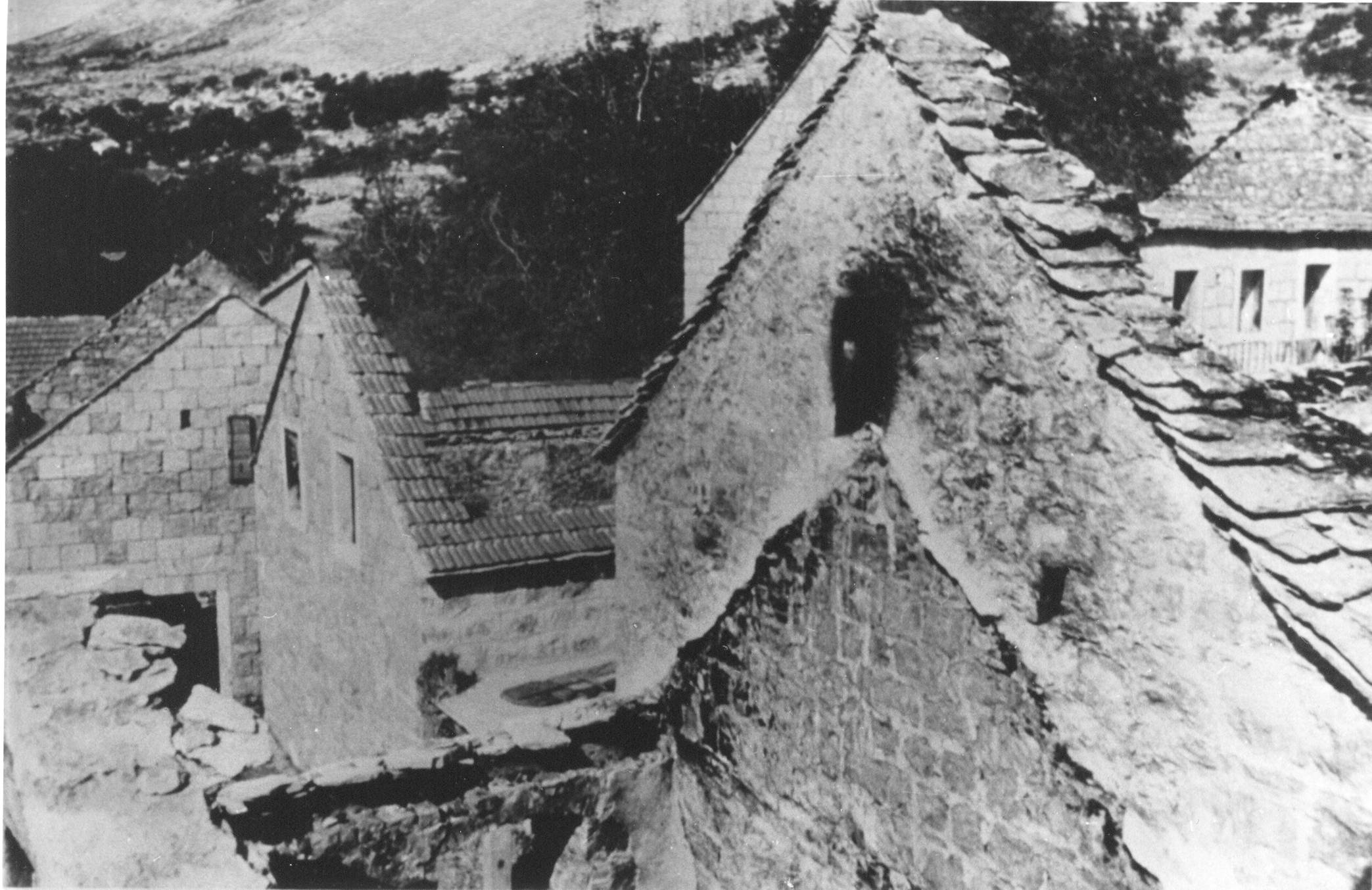
- Destroyed village houses after the massacre
- Location: Gata, Croatia
- Date: 1 October 1942
- Target: Croat civilians
- Attack type: War crime, ethnic cleansing, genocidal massacre
- Deaths: 96
- Perpetrator: Dinara Chetnik Division assisted by Italian 12th Infantry Division Sassari

Location of Gata in Croatia

The Gata massacre was the murder of 96 villagers in the Croatian village of Gata in 1942. The perpetrators of this massacre were members of Momčilo Đujić's Dinara Chetnik Division, under the leadership of Commander (vojvode) Mane Rokvić.

== Background ==
At the end of September 1942, the Yugoslav partisans in Dalmatia intensified their actions against the Axis forces and caused disturbance among Italian officers in charge of the region. Italian General Umberto Spigo, commander of the XVIIIth Army Corps, was particularly frustrated with the authorities of the Independent State of Croatia because he felt they were not cooperating enough with the Italians, and because they could not obtain information about recent Communist sabotages from the local Croatian population. Therefore, the Italians devised a plan of action against Communist activities in the Omiš area. About 150 Chetniks were carried by Italian transport trucks as additional reinforcements. On 1 October 1942, at around 6 in the morning, parts of the Chetnik forces began moving towards the Dalmatian village of Gata.

== The massacre ==
Shortly before entering the village, the Chetniks met a group of Croatian women carrying milk to Omiš. The Chetniks murdered the women by cutting their throats. After Gata was surrounded by Chetnik and Italian forces, the initial ones started massacring the villagers. A nine-year-old boy named Maksim saw his cousin Ante run away covered in blood and with a knife sticking out of his throat. Maksim then alarmed the rest of his family who began to flee towards the Mount Mosor. The then 12-year-old survivor Andrija Pivčević remembers the witnessed events:

" I was in a group of twelve. I've seen with my own eyes how they killed people. I saw them slaughtering Danica Miloš, her 10-year-old son and how they tossed her 1-year-old daughter in the air and impaled her on a bayonet. They shot me with a rifle in my buttock and then one of the Chetniks approached me and asked if I prefer to be finished by a bullet or a knife. I was begging him not to kill me because I was my mom's only son. After that he started stabbing me with his knife. He stabbed me 9 times."

Pivčević survived the massacre by pretending to be dead and after the war he testified in the trial of Draža Mihajlović. After the mass killings were over, most of the village houses were set on fire by the Chetniks. At least eight children were killed, the youngest victim of this carnage was a nine-month-old baby, while the oldest victim was an 87-year-old woman.

== Aftermath and remembrance ==
On the 70th anniversary of the massacre a commemoration was held. One of the notable people present there was the Croatian president Ivo Josipović.

An elementary school in Gata is named "1st October 1942" in the remembrance of this event.

== See also ==
- Trubar massacre
