= Kovačić, Croatia =

Kovačić
- Location within Croatia
- Coordinates: 44°03′N 16°13′E
- Country: Croatia
- County: Šibenik-Knin
- City: Knin

Area
  - Total: 15.8 km^{2} (6.1 sq mi)

Population (2021)
  - Total: 628
  - Density: 39.7/km^{2} (103/sq mi)
- Time zone: UTC+1 (CET)
  - Summer (DST): UTC+2 (CEST)

Kovačić is a village near Knin, Šibenik-Knin County, Croatia, population 900 (census 2011).

== Notable people ==
- Momčilo Đujić
