= Gata, Croatia =

Village in Split-Dalmatia County, Croatia

Gata
- Location within Croatia
- Coordinates: 43°28′N 16°42′E
- Country: Croatia
- County: Split-Dalmatia
- City: Omiš

Area
  - Total: 12.6 km^{2} (4.9 sq mi)

Population (2021)
  - Total: 599
  - Density: 47.5/km^{2} (123/sq mi)
- Time zone: UTC+1 (CET)
  - Summer (DST): UTC+2 (CEST)

Gata is a village located at the foot of the mountain Mosor, 16 miles east of the city of Split, and 1.3 miles inland from the coast of the Adriatic Sea. It is administratively located within the city of Omiš, in the Split-Dalmatia County. The village had a population of 567 in the 2011 census. It is located in the area of Poljica, near the river Cetina, at an elevation of 932 ft.

== History ==
Gata is a part of the historical Republic of Poljica, and up until the end of the Republic it was the place where the prince of Poljica was elected every year on the day of their patron Saint George.

The village was heavily damaged during the massacre on 1 October 1942, when a group of Chetniks led by Mane Rokvić (under Momčilo Đujić), under the protection of the fascist occupiers, killed 79 villagers and burned the village. This date is still commemorated today in an annual mass.

== Culture ==
The village organizes an annual festival called the Days of Ivo Marjanović in honor of this great actor.

Gata contains the ruins of an early Christian basilica.

== Population ==
About 600 villagers live in Gata and the surrounding smaller villages of Podgrac, Gomila, Pocelje, Čovići, and Kuvačići. The majority of the population is Roman Catholic.
