= List of the last monarchs in Europe =

This is a list of the last monarchs in Europe.

== List ==
Nation / territory	Monarch	Title	Birth	Reigned from	Reign ceased	Reason	Death	Arms	^{Ref}
Albania	Victor Emmanuel III	King of Albania	11 November 1869	16 April 1939	3 September 1943	Armistice of Cassibile	28 December 1947		
Armenia	Levon V	King of Armenia	1342	1374	1375	Deposed	29 November 1393		
Austria-Hungary	Charles I and IV	Emperor of Austria and King of Hungary	17 August 1887	21 November 1916	11 & 13 November 1918	"Relinquished participation in the administration of the State"	1 April 1922		
Bulgaria	Simeon II	Tsar of Bulgaria	16 June 1937	28 August 1943	15 September 1946	Republican constitution adopted	Living		
Circassia (Chemguy)	Jembulat Boletuqo	Grand Prince of Chemguy, Grand Prince of Circassia	c. Late 18th c.	1827	1836	Assassinated	1836		
Croatia	Tomislav II	King of Croatia	9 March 1900	18 May 1941	31 July 1943	Abdicated	29 January 1948		
Cyprus	Catherine	Queen of Cyprus	25 November 1454	26 August 1474	26 February 1489	Abdicated	10 July 1510		
France	Napoleon III	Emperor of the French	20 April 1808	2 December 1852	4 September 1870	Abdicated	9 January 1873		
Germany	Wilhelm II	German Emperor, King of Prussia	27 January 1859	15 June 1888	9 November 1918	Abdicated	9 June 1941		
Greece	Constantine II	King of the Hellenes	2 June 1940	6 March 1964	1 June 1973	Deposed	10 January 2023		
Iceland	Christian X	King of Iceland	26 September 1870	14 May 1912	17 June 1944	Republican constitution adopted	20 April 1947		
Irish Free State	George VI	King of Great Britain, Ireland and the British Dominions beyond the Seas	14 December 1895	11 December 1936	29 December 1937	Constitution of Ireland	6 February 1952		
Italy	Umberto II	King of Italy	15 September 1904	9 May 1946	18 June 1946	Republican constitution adopted	18 March 1983		
Kabardia	Jankhot Kushuk	Grand Prince of Kabardia	c. 1758	1809	1822	Transition to Russian administrative court	1830		
Kartli-Kakheti (Eastern Georgia)	George XII	King of all Georgia, King of all Kartli, Kakheti and all the other lands	10 November 1746	11 January 1798	28 December 1800	Death	28 December 1800		
Kazakh Khanate	Kenesary Qasymov	Kazakh Khan	1802	1841	1847	Deposed	1847		
Malta	Elizabeth II	Queen of Malta	21 April 1926	21 September 1964	13 December 1974	Republican constitution adopted	8 September 2022		
Montenegro	Nicholas I	King of Montenegro	7 October 1841	28 August 1910	26 November 1918	Monarchy abolished	1 March 1921		
Portugal	Manuel II	King of Portugal and the Algarves	15 November 1889	1 February 1908	5 October 1910	Monarchy abolished	2 July 1932		
Romania	Michael I	King of Romania	25 October 1921	6 September 1940	30 December 1947	Monarchy abolished	5 December 2017		
Russia	Nicholas II	Emperor and Autocrat of all the Russias	18 May 1868	1 November 1894	15 March 1917	Abdicated	17 July 1918		
Yugoslavia	Peter II	King of Yugoslavia	6 September 1923	9 October 1934	29 November 1945	Deposed	3 November 1970		

== See also ==
- Monarchies in Europe
- List of the last monarchs in Oceania
