= Peter II of Yugoslavia =

King of Yugoslavia from 1934 to 1945

Peter II Petar II Karađorđević Петар II Карађорђевић
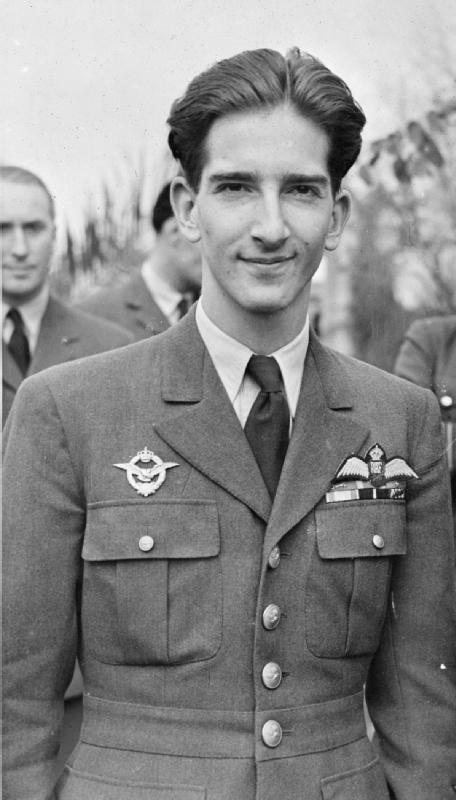
- Peter II in 1944

King of Yugoslavia
- Reign: 9 October 1934 – 29 November 1945
- Coronation: 28 March 1941
- Predecessor: Alexander I
- Successor: Monarchy abolished; Ivan Ribar as President of the Presidency of the Constitutional Assembly of Yugoslavia
- Regent: Paul (1934–41)

Head of the Royal House Karađorđević
- Tenure: 29 November 1945 – 3 November 1970
- Successor: Alexander, Crown Prince of Yugoslavia
- Born: 6 September 1923; Old Royal Palace, Belgrade, Kingdom of Serbs, Croats and Slovenes
- Died: 3 November 1970 (aged 47); Denver, Colorado, U.S.
- Burial: Saint Sava Monastery, Libertyville, Illinois, U.S. (1970–2013); Oplenac, Topola, Serbia (from 2013)
- Spouse: Alexandra of Greece and Denmark (m. 1944)
- Issue: Alexander, Crown Prince of Yugoslavia
- House: Karađorđević
- Father: Alexander I of Yugoslavia
- Mother: Maria of Romania

Styles of Peter II of Yugoslavia
- Reference style: His Majesty
- Spoken style: Your Majesty

Peter II Karađorđević (Serbian: Петар II Карађорђевић, Petar II Karađorđević; 6 September 1923 – 3 November 1970) was the last King of Yugoslavia, reigning from October 1934 until he was deposed in November 1945. He was the last reigning member of the Karađorđević dynasty.

The eldest child of King Alexander I and Maria of Romania, Peter acceded to the Yugoslav throne in 1934 at the age of 11 after his father was assassinated during a state visit to Marseille. A regency was set up under his cousin Prince Paul. After Paul declared Yugoslavia's accession to the Tripartite Pact in late March 1941, a pro-British coup d'état deposed the regent and declared the then 17-year-old Peter of legal ruling age.

In response, Axis forces invaded Yugoslavia ten days later and quickly overran the country, forcing the king and his ministers into exile in the United Kingdom. A government-in-exile was set up in June 1941 following Peter's arrival at London. In March 1944, he married Princess Alexandra of Greece and Denmark. Their only son, Alexander, was born a year later. In November 1945, the Yugoslav Constituent Assembly formally deposed Peter and proclaimed Yugoslavia a republic.

Peter settled in the United States after his deposition. Suffering from depression and alcoholism later in his life, he died of cirrhosis in November 1970, aged 47. His remains were buried at the Saint Sava Monastery Church in Libertyville, Illinois, before being transferred to the Royal Mausoleum of Oplenac in 2013.

== Early life and education ==
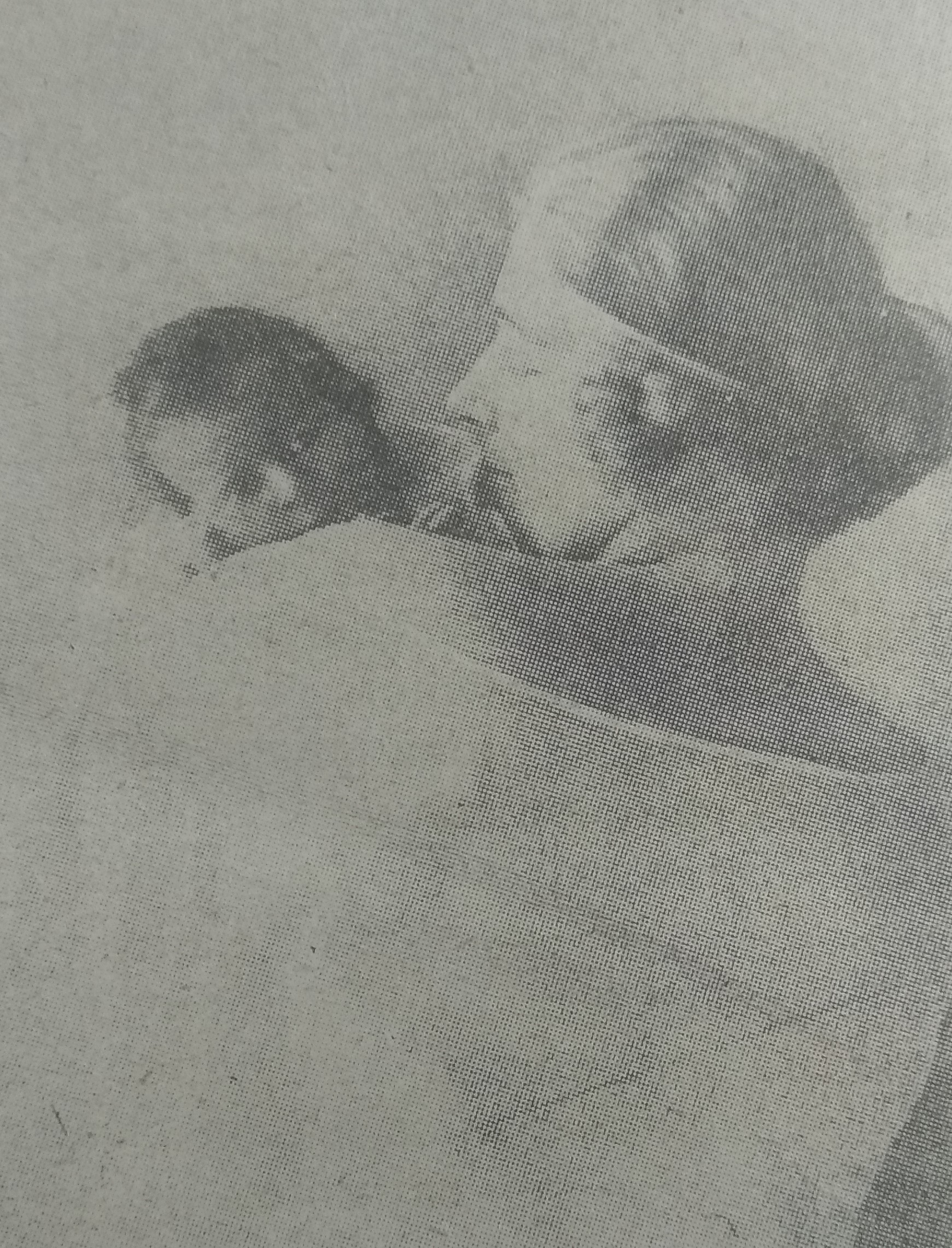
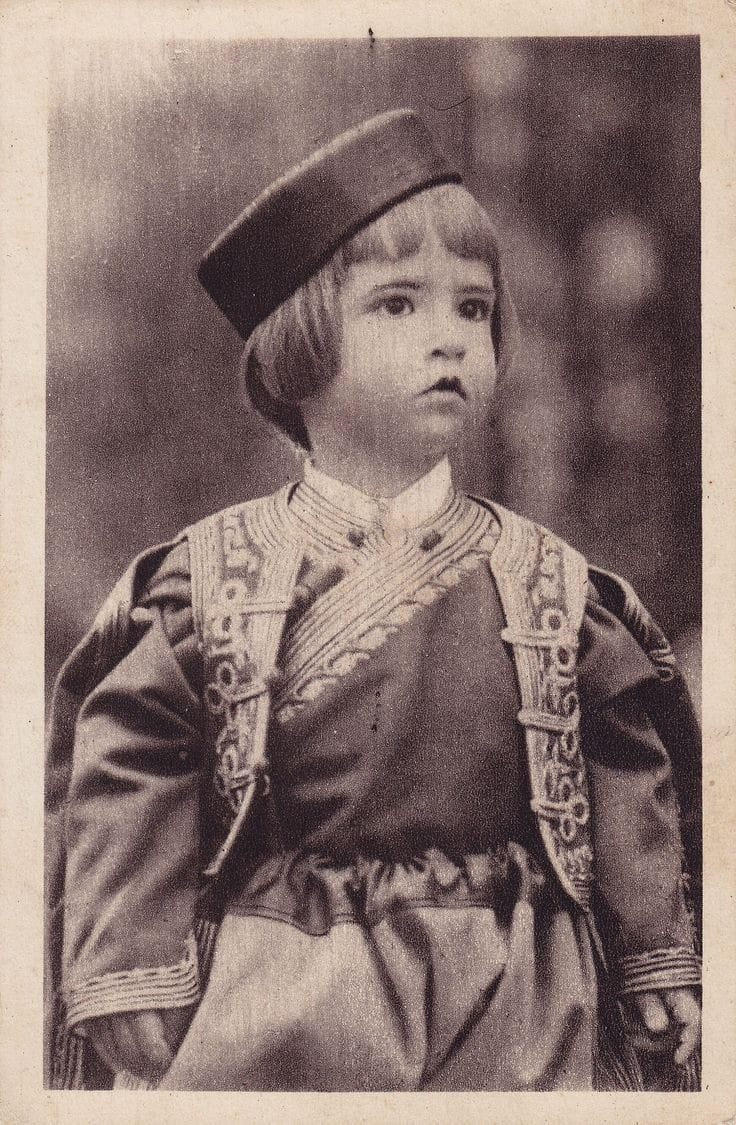
Peter with his mother Maria in 1923 (left) and as a child in 1926 (right)

Peter II was born on 6 September 1923 in Belgrade, Yugoslavia (modern-day Serbia). He was the eldest son of Alexander I of Yugoslavia and Maria of Romania. His godparents were his maternal aunt Queen Elizabeth of Greece, his maternal grandfather King Ferdinand I of Romania and King George V of the United Kingdom, for whom his son, the Duke of York, stood proxy.

Prince Peter was initially tutored at the Royal Palace, Belgrade, before attending Sandroyd School then in Cobham, Surrey where Reed's School now stands. When he was 11 years old, Prince Peter succeeded to the Yugoslav throne on 9 October 1934 upon his father's assassination in Marseille during a state visit to France. In view of the new monarch's youth, a regency was set up under his father's cousin Prince Paul.

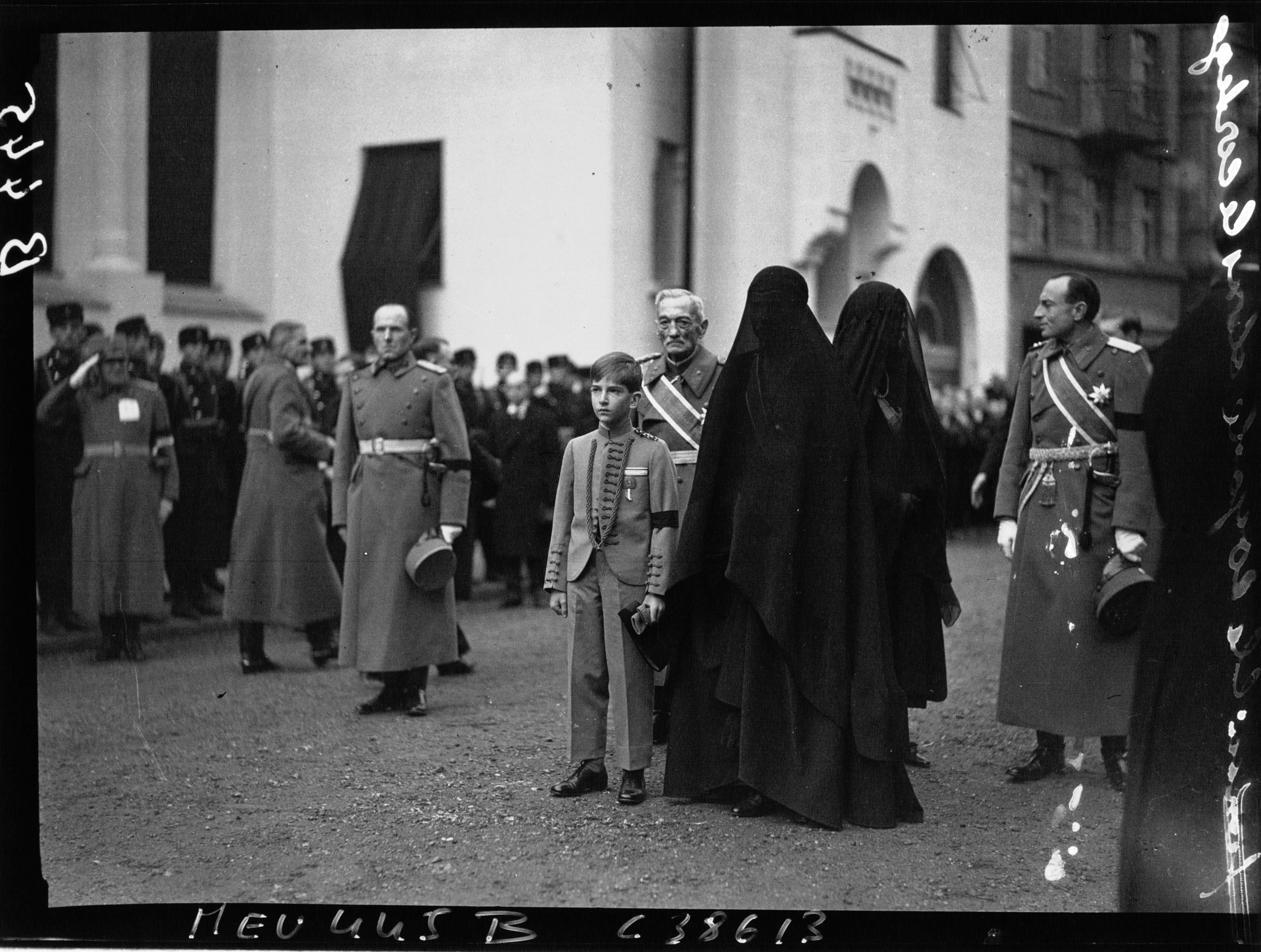
11-year-old King Peter II, Dowager Queen Maria and Prince Paul (right) at King Alexander's funeral in 1934 in Belgrade

Prince Regent Paul took the view that he must not change the kingdom from the way that King Alexander had left it so that his son could take possession of it unaltered when he turned 18 in September 1941, and resisted any attempts to revise the 1931 constitution. On 20 August 1939, Paul permitted the prime minister, Dragiša Cvetković, to sign an agreement with Vladko Maček, the leader of the Croatian Peasant Party, which created a new Banovina of Croatia with substantial autonomy and a much greater size, covering much of what is now Bosnia and Herzegovina, and satisfying at least in part the long-standing demands of the Croats.

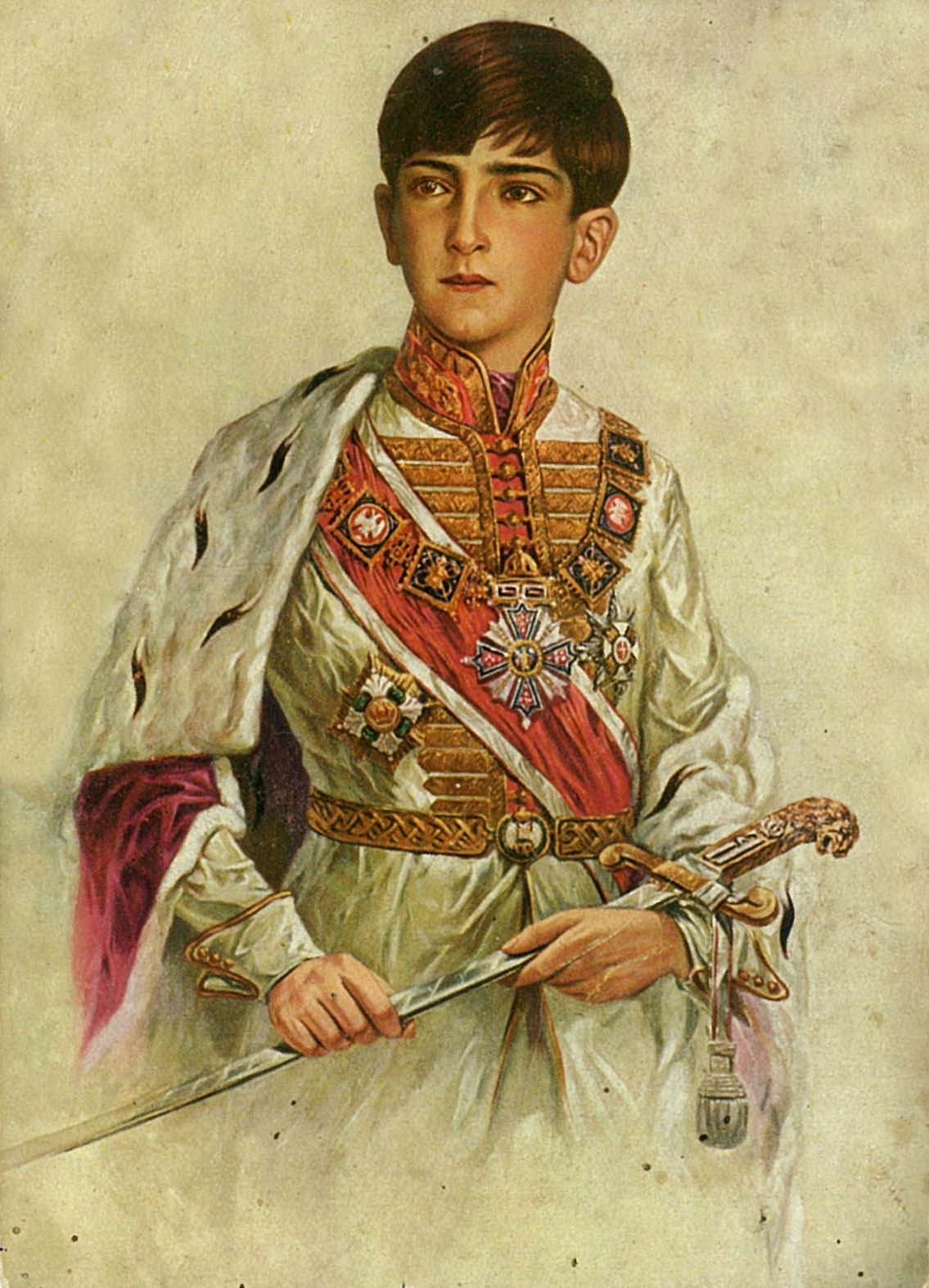
A portrait of the young King Peter II holding his father's sabre

The agreement was very unpopular with the Serbs, especially when reports emerged that the prečani Serbs were being discriminated against by the authorities of the autonomous banovina. The tense international situation of August 1939 with the Danzig crisis pushing Europe to the brink of war meant Paul wanted to settle one of the more debilitating internal disputes in order to make Yugoslavia more capable of surviving the coming storm.

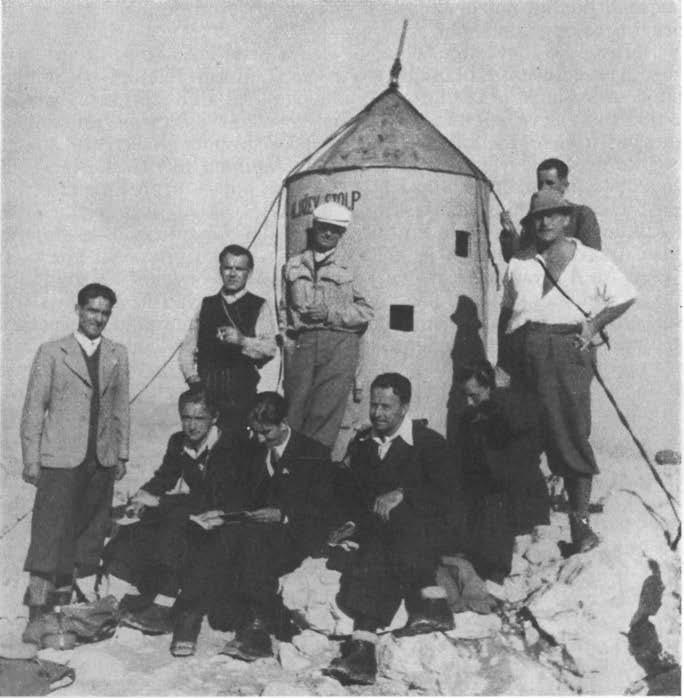
15-year-old King Peter II on Mount peak Triglav 2,863.65 metres (9,395.2 ft), near the tripoint border of the Kingdom Yugoslavia, Fascist Italy and Nazi Germany, on August 12, 1939; 20 days later, Germany invaded Poland.

The agreement came at the cost of both Paul and Cvetković being condemned by Serbian public opinion for "selling out" to the Croats, all the more so as many Croats made it clear that they saw the banovina of Croatia as only a stepping stone towards independence. The unpopularity of the agreement and the Cvetković government, was one of the reasons for the coup d'état of 27 March 1941 as many Serbs believed that Peter, the son of King Alexander, would continue with his father's centralising policies when he reached his majority.

== Second World War ==
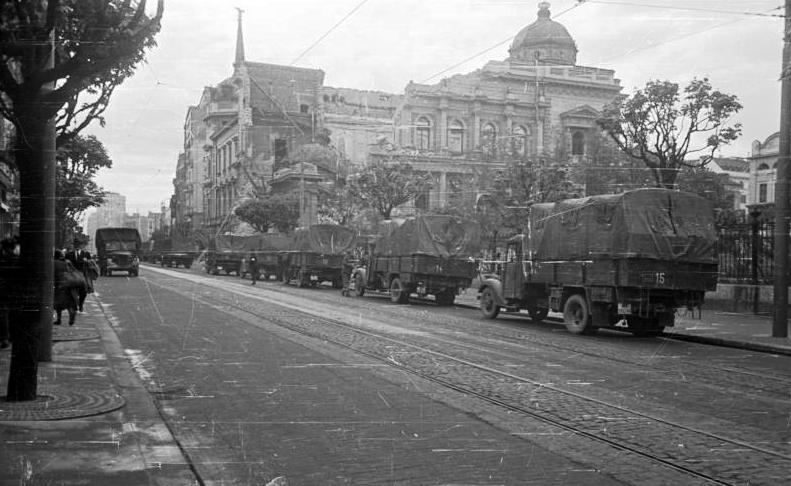
The damaged Royal Palace in Belgrade during the German and Italian invasion of Yugoslavia in April 1941. One of the main targets during the first wave of Luftwaffe bombing of Belgrade, on April 6, 1941, were royal palaces in the downtown.

Prince Regent Paul declared that the Kingdom of Yugoslavia would join the Tripartite Pact on 25 March 1941. Two days later, King Peter, at age 17, was proclaimed of age after a pro-Allied Powers coup d'état. The initially bloodless coup was led by General Dušan Simović on 27 March 1941 in the name of Peter. As General Simović led his men toward the Royal Compound, which was surrounded by guards loyal to the Regent, Peter climbed down a drain-pipe to greet the rebels.

As the Regent's guards surrendered without fighting, Simović arrived to tell Peter: "Your Majesty, I salute you as King of Yugoslavia. From this moment you will exercise your full sovereign power". The coup was very popular in Belgrade and Peter was well received by the crowds. The people who had come out in Belgrade to show their support for the coup had a very pro-Allied character, many of the protesters waving British and French flags. The crowds in Belgrade cheered Peter wildly as the 17-year-old king drove his car down the streets without his bodyguards to be greeted by his subjects.

The new government that Peter swore in on 27 March 1941 was headed by General Simović and comprised members of the People's Radical Party, the Croatian Peasant Party, the Democratic Party, the Croatian Independent Democrats, the Slovene People's Party, the Yugoslav Muslim Organization, the Agrarian Party and the Yugoslav National Party. With the exception of the Yugoslav Radical Alliance and the banned Yugoslav Communist Party and the Ustashe, all of the main political parties were represented in the new government.

Postponing Operation Barbarossa, Nazi Germany simultaneously attacked Yugoslavia and Greece on 6 April 1941, Orthodox Easter Sunday. The Luftwaffe bombed Belgrade, killing between 3,000 and 4,000 people. Within a week, Germany, Bulgaria, Hungary and Italy invaded Yugoslavia, and the government was forced to surrender on 17 April. Parts of Yugoslavia were annexed by Italy, Bulgaria, Hungary and Germany. The remaining parts were governed by two German-controlled puppet governments, the Independent State of Croatia and the Serbian Government of National Salvation.

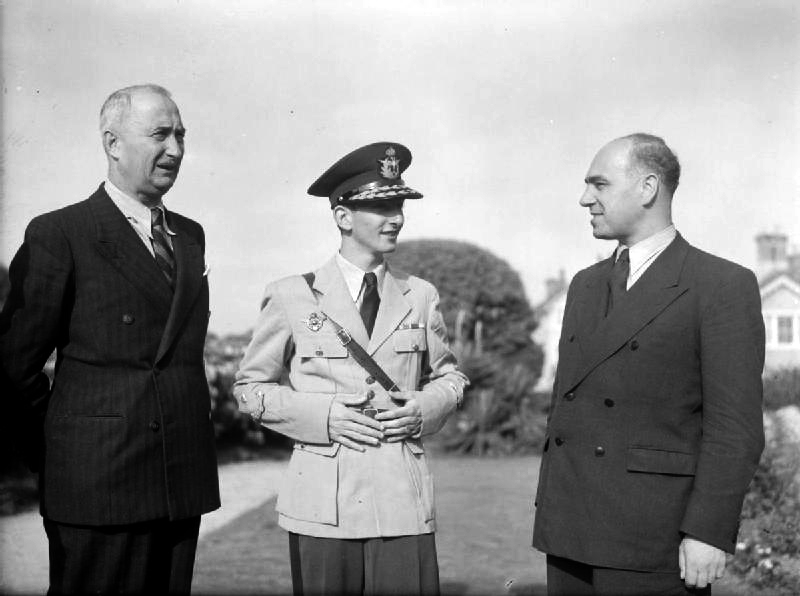
Prime Minister Dušan Simović, Peter II and Court Minister Radoje Knežević on 21 June 1941

Peter left the country with the Royal Yugoslav Government's ministers following the Axis invasion. Initially the Yugoslav king and his government ministers went to Greece where they refuelled at a British airfield in rural Greece where locals did not at first believe that he was king of Yugoslavia. They then went to British-ruled Jerusalem in Mandatory Palestine, and Cairo in Egypt. In Athens on 16 April 1941, Peter issued a press statement saying he would fight until victory before fleeing Greece.

In Jerusalem on 4 May 1941, Peter affirmed in a press statement the Cvetković–Maček agreement of 23 August 1939, which agreed Yugoslavia would become a semi-federation as the basis of the post-war political system he was planning to introduce once his nation was liberated. Of the 22 men Peter had sworn in as ministers on 27 March 1941, two were killed during the German invasion and another five chose not to go into exile.

Džafer Kulenović of the Yugoslav Muslim Organization switched sides and went over to the Ustashe, urging Bosnian Muslims to join the Croats in killing Serbs; Father Franc Kulovec of the Slovene People's Party was killed during the bombing of Belgrade; and Vladko Maček of the Croatian Peasant Party decided not to go into exile. As a result, the Yugoslav government-in-exile was dominated by Serb ministers.

The constitutional basis of the government-in-exile was always murky, as the government had come into power as a result of a coup d'état. Regardless, it professed to be based on the 1931 constitution, which made the king the chief executive officer of the state and ministers only responsible to the Crown. The politicians took the view that the 1941 coup d'état had been a popular revolution which had restored democracy, but as long as the 1931 constitution was technically still in effect, King Peter had very broad executive powers.

=== Government-in-exile ===
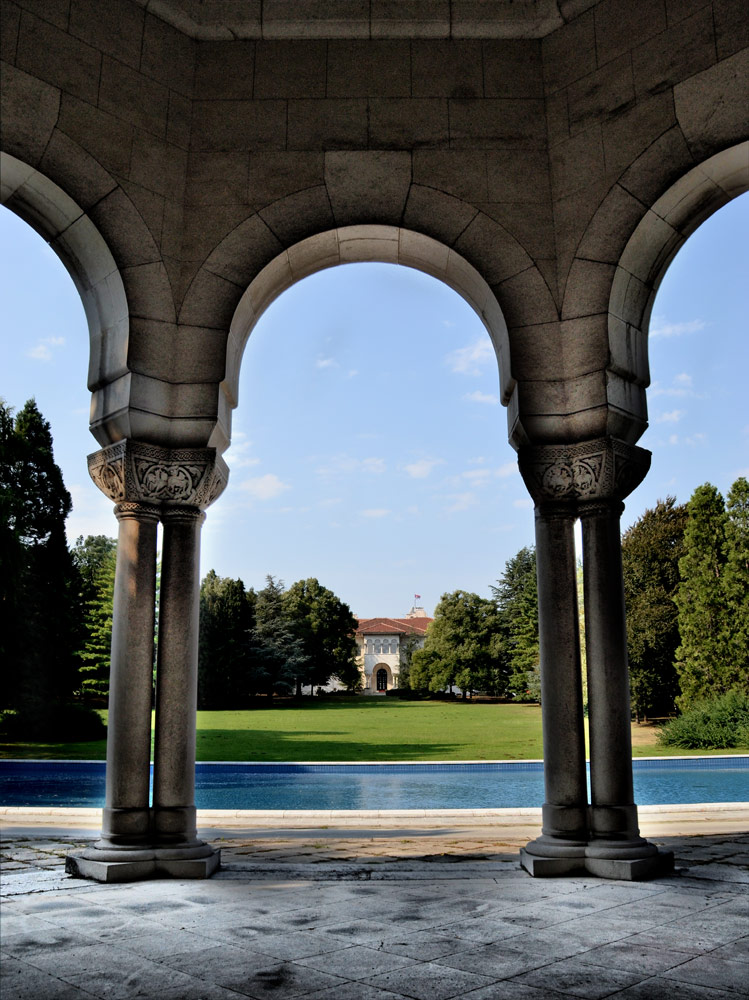
Royal Palace in Belgrade, the residence of Peter II

In June 1941, King Peter arrived in London, where he joined other governments in exile from Nazi-occupied Europe. When Peter and his government landed in London they were greeted as heroes by the British media. The British press presented what the Serbian historian Stevan K. Pavlowitch called a "romanticized" picture of the young Peter, who became a "symbol of his country's struggle to keep its freedom in alliance with Great Britain". He was supplied with a Lendrum & Hartman Limited Buick delivered to his exile home near Cambridge.

A sign of the initial high regard for Peter in the neutral United States, he was featured as a hero in October 1941 edition of the comic book Military Comics: Stories of the Army and Navy, which presented a somewhat fictionalized version of the 27 March 1941 coup d'état in Belgrade in which a group of secondary school students who are upset by Yugoslavia's signing of the Tripartite Pact rally for the king and overthrow the regent. Peter quickly learned that the degree of attention the British were willing to give to the government-in-exile was directly related to what assets the government-in-exile could bring to the Allied cause. As only a few hundred Yugoslav soldiers had escaped to Egypt, the Yugoslav government-in-exile did not have much to contribute.

Initially, the government-in-exile planned to make good its losses by recruiting an army from Yugoslav immigrants in the neutral United States, but the American government objected to this plan, and instead the government-in-exile had to recruit from the ethnic Slovene POWs captured while fighting with the Royal Italian Army. From the British POW camps, enough ethnic Slovenes volunteered to provide one infantry battalion, who were reluctant to fight against the Italians as they would be executed for treason if captured. In terms of military forces available in the Middle East, Yugoslavia was as Pavlowitch put it the "least important of the allies". The Yugoslav officer corps in Egypt was prone to feuding between younger officers who blamed the senior officers for Yugoslavia's swift defeat in April 1941, and such was the extent of the in-fighting that the government-in-exile had to ask the British military police to impose its will on its own army.

In this context, when King Peter and the rest of the government-in-exile heard reports in mid-1941 that a guerrilla movement called the Chetniks led by Colonel Draža Mihailović were fighting the Germans, he triumphantly seized upon these reports as proving that he did have an asset to the Allied cause that was tying down German forces that otherwise would be fighting on the other fronts. It was not until October 1941 that the government-in-exile was finally able to establish contact with General Mihailović. In September 1941, a liaison mission from the Special Operations Executive (SOE) parachuted into Yugoslavia to meet Mihailović, and afterwards, became the main means which Mihailović communicated with the Allies. It was through the SOE mission attached with the Chetniks that King Peter and the rest of government-in-exile communicated with Mihailović.

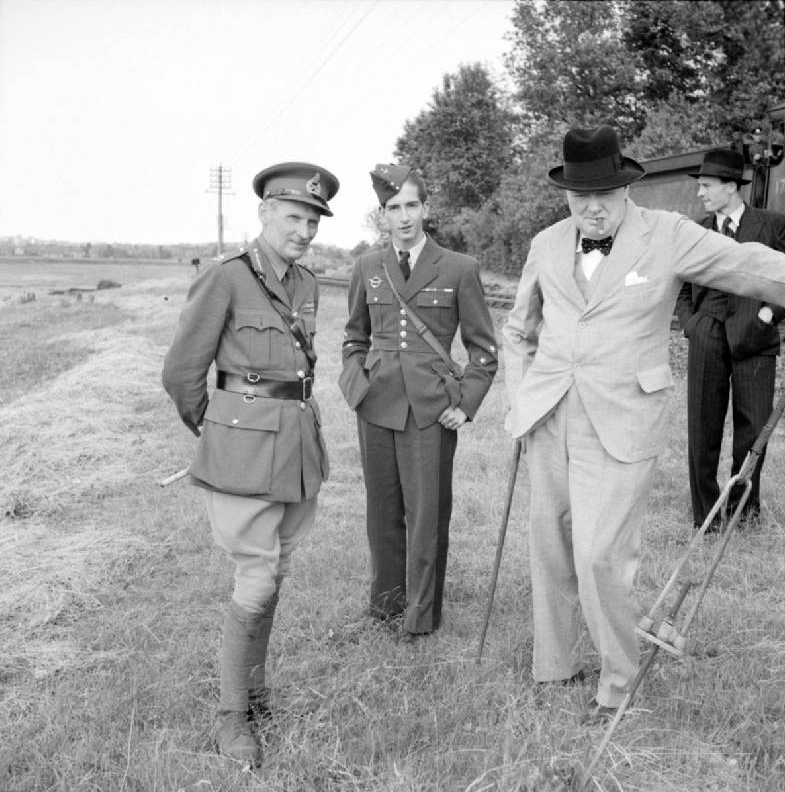
Lt-General Bernard Montgomery, 17-year-old King Peter II and Winston Churchill in July 1941

The news that the Croat fascists of the Ustashe had started a campaign to exterminate one-third of the prečani Serbs in the Krajina region and in Bosnia, expel another one-third and force the rest to convert to Roman Catholicism brought tensions in the government-in-exile between the Serb ministers and the few remaining Croat ministers to the boiling point and by October–November 1941, the cabinet almost collapsed. Adding to the tension was that the Croatian ministers refused to believe the reports about Ustashe atrocities, dismissing them as anti-Croat "Serb propaganda", which infuriated the Serbian ministers.

Several Serb ministers told King Peter that they found it difficult to be in the same room as the Croat ministers, after they were blithely dismissive of reports of the Ustashe killing prečani Serbs in a variety of gruesome ways. Regardless, it was felt necessary to retain them in order to maintain the claim that the Yugoslav government-in-exile spoke for all the peoples of Yugoslavia. The Croat ministers were unwilling to resign, fearing a Serb-dominated government returning after the war. With neither side willing to risk the cabinet collapsing, the crisis passed. Relations between the Croat and Serb ministers remained notably cold and distant.

Disagreements had emerged over who was to head the government-in-exile. General Borivoje Mirković wanted a cabinet of generals headed by himself, which was opposed by all of the politicians and Simović. Radoje Knežević wanted a coalition government of the political parties whose leaders had chosen to go into exile. General Simović wanted a "government of national salvation" made up of "distinguished personalities" from all walks of life which he would lead, which would exclude most of the politicians.

Simović as Prime Minister had an authoritarian manner and a disdain for politicians, and was soon feuding with the rest of his cabinet, who started writing letters to Peter asking him to dismiss his overbearing prime minister. The leader of the anti-Simović group was the distinguished scholar and historian Slobodan Jovanović, who served as deputy prime minister. As a liberal Serb, he opposed the more chauvinistic Serb nationalists, and so held a degree of credibility with the non-Serb ministers. Simović felt he had a duty to "tutor" the teenage king in the ways of statecraft and politics, and their relation became strained. Peter found Simović to be too dominating, and resented being "lectured" by his prime minister.

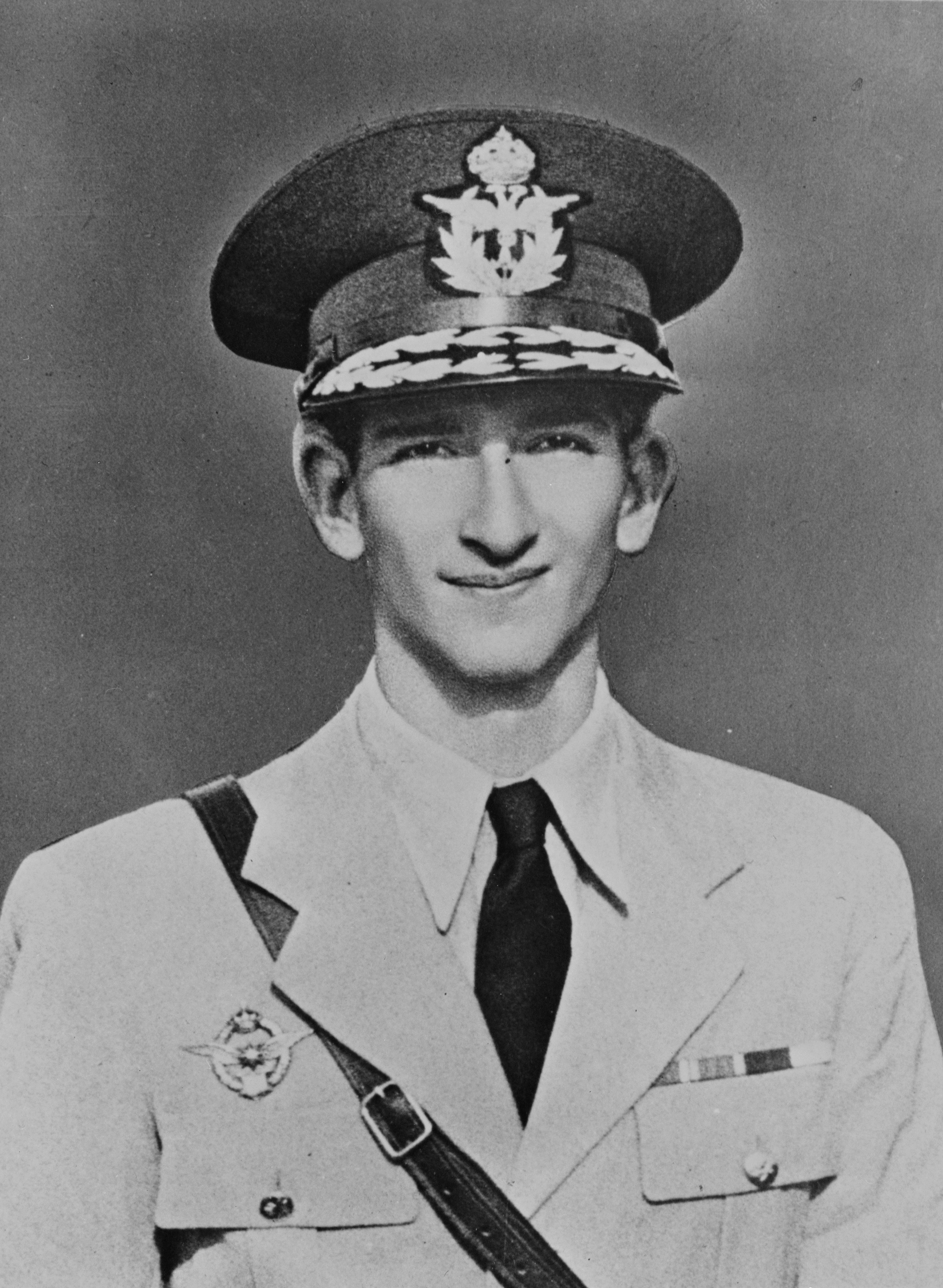
Peter in 1942

Outside of the Soviet Union, Yugoslavia was the only place in Europe in 1941 that a full-scale guerrilla war was being waged against the Axis, leading as Pavlowitch put for Mihailović "...being built up by Yugoslav and British propaganda into an Allied superman". The popularity of Mihailović in Britain helped to seal the end of Simović's political career as the latter had been turned into a hero by the British press for leading the 27 March coup d'état, which made Peter for a long time reluctant to dismiss him. But with another Yugoslav hero in the form of Mihailović, Peter could dispense with Simović without fear of Fleet Street.

The instructions given by the prime minister Slobodan Jovanović to Mihailović in January 1942 were to protect the prečani Serbs from the massacres being waged by the Ustashe, but otherwise he was not to engage in any actions that would bring down reprisals against civilians unless absolutely necessary while at the same time he was to build up his forces to engage in a general uprising when the Allies landed in the Balkans. In October 1941, Mihailović had already decided upon a policy of limiting the Chetniks to sabotage attacks and of building up his forces for an uprising when the Allies returned to the Balkans. The German policy that for every German soldier killed, 100 Serb civilians would be shot in reprisal and for every wounded German soldier, 50 Serb civilians would be shot in reprisal worked to deter Chetniks from attacking the Wehrmacht after October 1941 as Mihailović concluded that guerrilla attacks were not worth the reprisals.

The Chetniks were most active in Serbia and Montenegro while the Communist Partisans drew most of their support from the prečani Serbs in Bosnia and in the Krajina and from anti-fascist Croats, Slovenes and Bosnian Muslims. Unlike the Chetniks who had a narrowly Serbian and Orthodox nationalist message, the Partisans were a pan-Yugoslav force. The Partisans were considerably better organized than the Chetniks and were more willing to accept the reprisals committed against innocent civilians by the Axis when they staged guerrilla attacks, leading to a situation where the Partisans ended up doing more of the fighting against the occupiers and the collaborators, an aspect of the war in Yugoslavia which caused Britain and the United States to ultimately favor the Partisans.

At the same time, British policy in Yugoslavia was increasingly for the resistance to engage in maximum violence against the Axis in order to tie down German and Italian divisions that would otherwise be fighting the Allies, no matter what the cost in reprisals to innocent civilians, a policy that clashed with the Chetnik policy of waiting for the Allies to return to Yugoslavia before engaging in a general uprising. The very way in which Mihailović and the Chetniks had been built up in 1941 in the British media, partly by the Yugoslav government-in-exile itself, as a force of ferocious guerrillas fiercely fighting the Germans at every turn, led to very grave disappointments by 1942 when it emerged at very best the Chetniks were waiting for the British to return to the Balkans before they were willing to engage in heavy fighting.

The King completed his education at Cambridge University before being commissioned in the Royal Air Force. In mid-1941, the Yugoslav government-in-exile opened talks with the Greek government-in-exile for a post-war confederation––the Balkan Union––that would unite Yugoslavia, Greece and Bulgaria once King Boris III of Bulgaria was overthrown. The Greek prime minister Emmanouil Tsouderos supported the confederation plan, but objected to the Yugoslav plans to bring in Bulgaria and for the proposed confederation to have an executive government in charge of all economic, foreign policy and military questions, leading Tsouderous to ask the British Foreign Secretary Sir Anthony Eden to mediate.

In July 1941, the Yugoslav government-in-exile recognized the Czechoslovak government-in-exile, and starting in September 1941 Peter regularly met with President Edvard Beneš to discuss a new Yugoslav-Czechoslovak alliance to replace the Little Entente that Beneš had negotiated with Peter's father, King Alexander, in 1921. On 31 December 1941, the Greek-Yugoslav talks concluded and on 15 January 1942 the Accord entre le Royaume de Yougoslavie et le Royaume Grèce concernant la constitution de l'Union balkanique was signed in London. The accord committed Yugoslavia and Greece after the war to have a common currency; a customs union; to co-ordinate their foreign policies; for a military alliance with joint staff talks for a common defense plan; and a committee consisting of the Yugoslav and Greek finance ministers, foreign ministers, and defense ministers to meet regularly to plan policies for the Balkan Union.

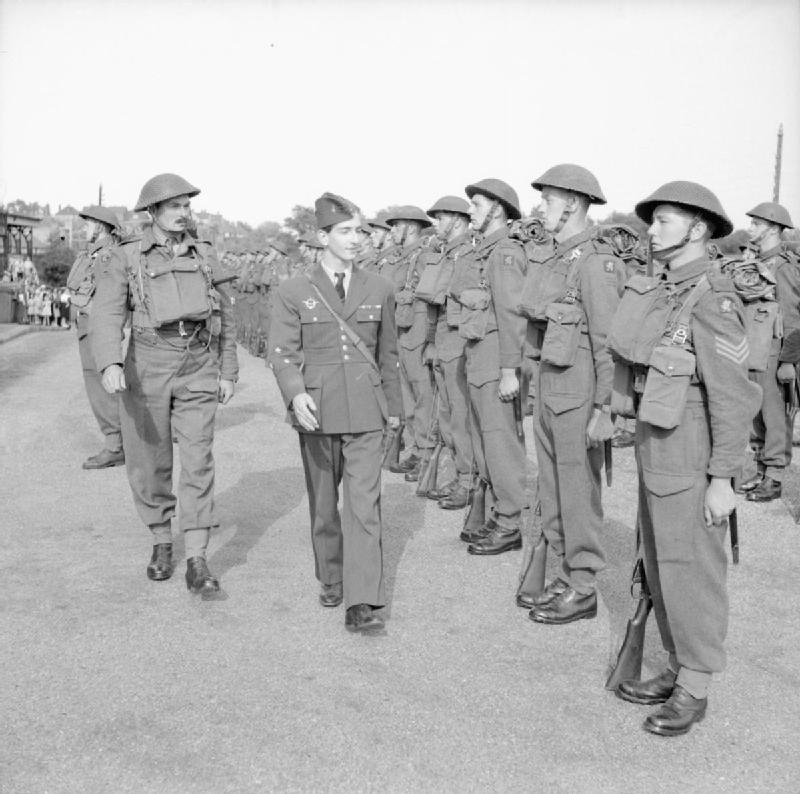
Peter II inspecting the Guard of Honour of a battalion of the Dorset Regiment in England

After signing the accord, King Peter and King George II of Greece spoke to the British press at a luncheon where the two kings spoke of the "Balkan Union" as being open to all of the states of the Balkans. On 11 January 1942, Peter dismissed his prime minister, General Dušan Simović, who proved himself to be an inept politician who was unable to get along with his cabinet, which had been threatening to all jointly resign since late 1941 if General Simović continued as prime minister. The new prime minister was Slobodan Jovanović, a widely respected historian.

At the same time that Peter dismissed Simović, he appointed Mihailović minister of war; as Mihailović remained in Yugoslavia, his position in the cabinet was purely symbolic. On 19 January 1942 at the Dorchester Hotel in London, the king and President Beneš together with the rest of the Yugoslav and Czechoslovak cabinets had lunch together to discuss a post-war regional association. Peter in his speech noted that he was happy that two of the men who negotiated the Little Entente, Momčilo Ninčić and Edvard Beneš "are here today" in this room. The plans to ally the proposed Greek-Yugoslav confederation with the proposed Czechoslovak-Polish confederation that Beneš had signed with General Władysław Sikorski, the leader of the Polish government-in-exile, drew intense objections from the Soviet Union which preferred the states of eastern Europe remain separate to keep them weak.

As in Yugoslavia, the Greek resistance was divided between communists and royalists, and Tsouderos objected to Peter that his friendship with Beneš and his plans to link the "Balkan Union" with the Polish-Czechoslovak confederation would cause the Soviets to cease recognizing George II as the king of the Hellenes. Tsouderos's fear was that the Soviet Union would recognize the Communist-dominated EAM as the legitimate government of Greece, and for this reason, wanted to do nothing that would antagonize Moscow. It was largely because of opposition from Tsouderos that Peter shelved his plans for a post-war Polish-Czechoslovak-Yugoslav-Greek alliance.

The very dependence of the government-in-exile on the British was a source of much tension, and Peter in 1942 tried to involve the Soviet Union and the United States as counter-balances. In 1942 Peter made a diplomatic visit to America and Canada, where he met American President Franklin D. Roosevelt and Canadian Prime Minister William Lyon Mackenzie King. The whirlwind tour was unsuccessful in securing Allied support for the exiled Yugoslav monarchist cause. Roosevelt and Churchill had already engaged the support of the Communist Yugoslav Government in the Allied effort to defeat Nazi Germany, with a view to ending the Second World War. Roosevelt made Yugoslavia eligible for Lend-Lease aid during Peter's visit, but given the small size of the Yugoslav forces in exile, this was not of much assistance.

During his visit to the United States, King Peter met the Serbian-American scientist Nikola Tesla on 8 July 1942 and wrote in his diary: "I visited Dr Nikola Tesla, in his apartment in the Hotel New Yorker. After I had greeted him the aged scientist said: 'It is my greatest honour. I am glad you are in your youth, and I am content that you will be a great ruler. I believe I will live until you come back to a free Yugoslavia. From your father you have received his last words: "Guard Yugoslavia." I am proud to be a Serbian and a Yugoslav. Our people cannot perish. Preserve the unity of all Yugoslavs – the Serbs, the Croats and the Slovenes.'"

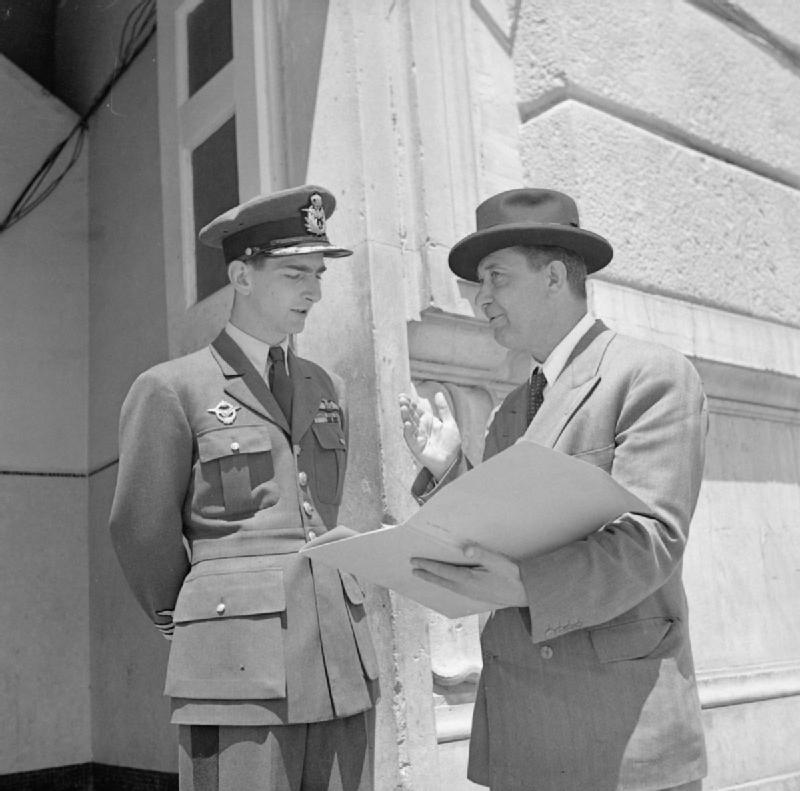
Peter II and Prime Minister Ivan Šubašić

In order to obtain support from Britain, Peter put his hopes for restoration on General Draža Mihailović, the leader of the Chetniks. On 10 June 1942, Peter promoted Mihailović to full general and made him the Chief of Staff of the Royal Yugoslav Army. Pavlowitch summarized the importance of Mihailović to King Peter by noting: "There was no other instance of the leader of a resistance movement being taken directly into an exiled government while remaining in occupied territory". Peter and the rest of the government-in-exile failed to appreciate that the Serb nationalism of Mihailović and the other Chetnik leaders was extremely offensive to the other peoples of Yugoslavia, all the more so as when reports of massacres committed by the Chetniks against Croats and Bosnian Muslims emerged.

For the peoples of Yugoslavia who were not Serbian, the king's support for the Chetniks seemed to suggest that after the war he was planning to establish a state that would be dominated by chauvinistic Serb nationalists, which led to those who wanted to resist the Axis occupation to support the Partisans who at least promised to establish a state where all the peoples of Yugoslavia would be equal.

The intense Serb nationalism of the Chetniks also caused alarm in London and Washington, sparking fears about the stability of Yugoslavia if it were restructured as a Serb-dominated state, which caused some decision-makers to feel that Yugoslavia would be more stable if ruled by the Croatian Communist Josip Broz Tito. Peter's efforts to have the United States as a counterbalance failed as the Americans shared the British frustration with the unwillingness of the Chetniks to engage in maximum violence against the Germans and were increasingly troubled by the reports that the Chetniks were collaborating with the Germans.

The Chetnik movement was motivated by a strong sense of resentment against all of the pre-war elites who were felt to have failed Yugoslavia in April 1941, and Mihailović did not have full control of his movement, being in many cases more of a figurehead whom many Chetnik commanders ignored whenever it was convenient for them. Besides for foreign policy considerations, the government-in-exile felt threatened by the anti-elitist and populist sentiments of the Chetniks and wanted to harness Mihailović to keep the Chetniks in a conservative direction.

The government-in-exile in London saw the Chetniks as a military movement whereas the Chetnik commanders saw their movement as both political and military. All of the Chetnik commanders professed to be monarchists who were loyal to King Peter, but in many cases the monarchism of the Chetniks was only superficial, being more of a legitimising device for the Chetnik leaders who justified their actions in the name of the distant king in London. Finally, the allegations, which first appeared in the press in 1942, that the Chetniks were not engaging in resistance, but instead collaborating with the Germans and the Italians in order to fight against the Communist Partisans proved to be extremely damaging to the image of King Peter in the West.

The government-in-exile tried its best to prevent the civil war between the Partisans and the Chetniks, but with no control over either the communists or the royalists, its efforts were futile. Jovanović at first tried to mediate an end to the civil war, arguing that the Partisans and Chetniks should be co-operating in fighting the Axis instead of each other, and when that failed, he tried to promote a "neutrality" agreement that would commit both movements from refraining from attacking each other that was likewise futile.

By 1943, the evidence that at least some Chetnik commanders were co-operating with the Axis was much stronger and Peter's insistence on defending the Chetniks was to do his reputation enormous damage in both Britain and the United States. Peter also did nothing to silence those ministers in his government who told the Anglo-American press that the Chetniks should crush the Communist Partisans to save the pre-1941 social order, which gave the impression that the government-in-exile cared more about restoring the social order than it did about winning the war.

Pavlowitch described Peter as an "immature" young man who was easily manipulated by the feuding politicians within the cabinet of his government-in-exile, and as a result, he was highly inconsistent in his policies as he changed his mind depending on who had last spoken to him. The Croat ministers preferred to talk directly to the king rather than their Serb counterparts while generally none of the Serb ministers were prepared to openly challenge the king, instead of flattening his ego. Peter always spoke of enjoying "ruling" rather more than he did the duty of "reigning", and did not behave as a strict constitutional monarch, becoming the focal point of the culture of intrigue which characterised the cabinet of the government-in-exile.

== Marriage ==
The Chicago Tribune reported on 1 August 1943 about the royal romance in London between King Peter and Princess Alexandra of Greece and Denmark that: "The princess, a pretty, dark-haired girl, used to serve waffles and coffee to American officers and nurses over a snack bar at the London Red Cross club. There she met King Peter, a slender young man in naval uniform who often dropped in to listen to the music of a United States infantry band". In April 1942, Peter proposed marriage to Princess Alexandra after a few weeks of courtship and she accepted.

While the Western media portrayed a "fairy tale romance" across the backdrop of wartime London between the young Yugoslav king and a Greek princess, the announcement of Peter's engagement to Alexandra in July 1943 caused immense controversy in his homeland. According to Serbian tradition, a leader must not marry during a national emergency, and the news that Peter had become engaged while his homeland was torn by war caused a backlash against him.

Starting in April 1941, Yugoslavia had experienced involvement in the Second World War, The Holocaust, and a civil war due to the efforts of the Yugoslav Partisans. All of this led to a collapse in living standards in a country which was already one of the least wealthy in Europe. Consequently, Peter's engagement and wedding in the relative comfort of London was seen as a break with Serbian traditions and out of touch with the conditions faced by the general public.

The cabinet in a rare show of unity had all objected to Peter's plans for a wedding in wartime when the issue was first discussed in April 1942, and the issue was not raised again until April 1943. Again, when the matter was discussed in early 1943 the Serb ministers had objected while from Serbia itself General Mihailović reported that public opinion strongly disapproved. The Prime Minister, Slobodan Jovanović, was opposed to announcing the engagement while Yugoslavia was still occupied, predicting that the news would discredit the monarchy in Serbia, and rather than postpone the engagement, which was announced in July 1943, Peter dismissed Jovanović on 26 June 1943.

In early 1944, the British Prime Minister Winston Churchill applied strong pressure on Peter to dismiss his prime minister, Božidar Purić, whom almost everybody viewed as incompetent, and to sever his links with General Mihailović, whom Churchill was convinced by this point was a collaborator. At the same time, the British threatened to stop arms shipments to Josip Broz Tito's Partisans unless he recognized King Peter as the rightful king of Yugoslavia. Churchill wanted to preserve the Yugoslav monarchy to keep the country in the western sphere of influence after the war while incorporating the Partisans into the royalist government-in-exile.

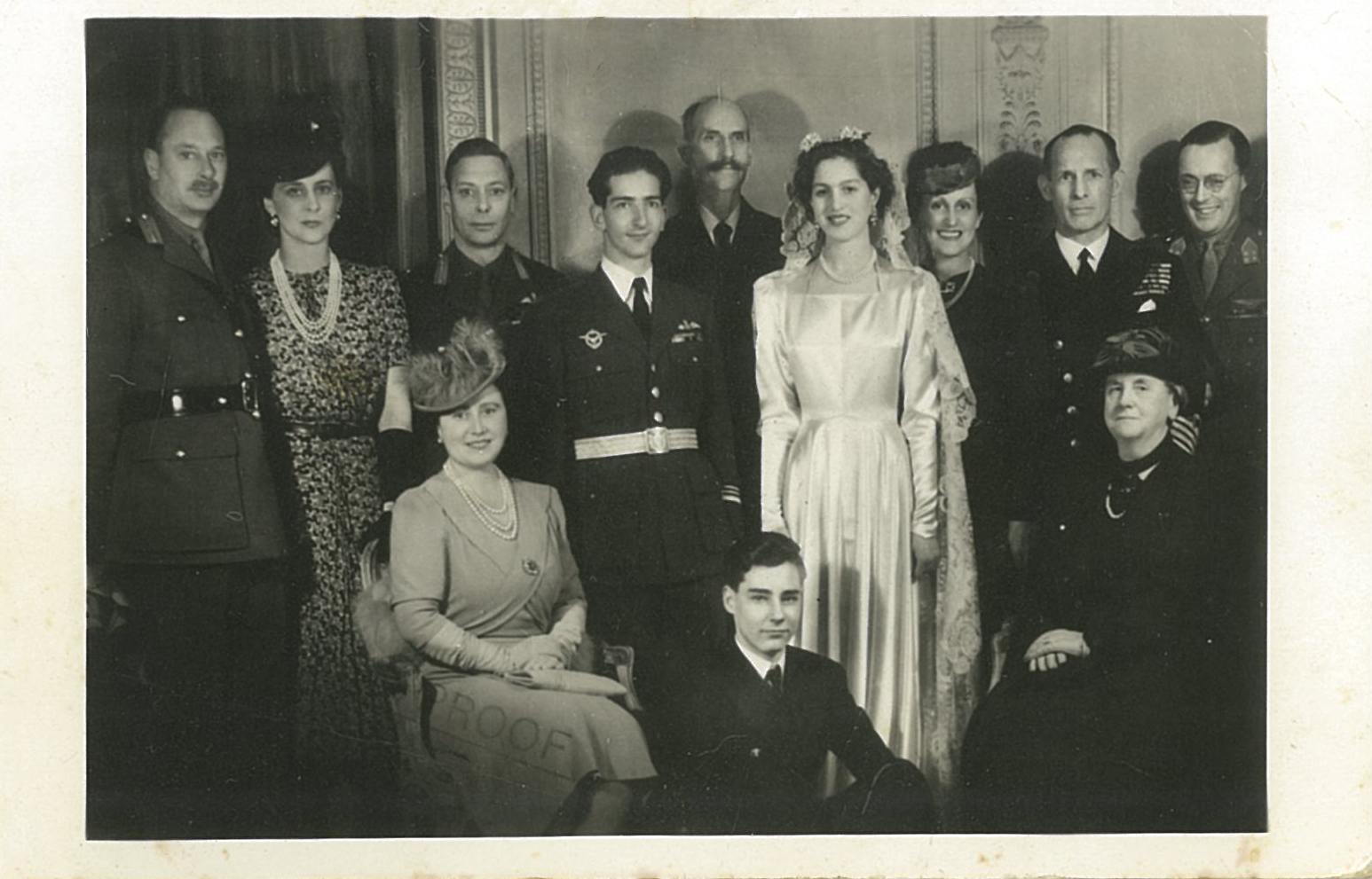
Marriage of Peter and Princess Alexandra of Greece and Denmark, 20 March 1944, London, England

Peter married Alexandra on 20 March 1944 at the Yugoslav legation at 195 Queen's Gate, Westminster. Among the guests at the ceremony, there were four reigning monarchs (George VI of the United Kingdom, who served as Peter's best man, George II of Greece, Haakon VII of Norway, and Wilhelmina of the Netherlands); others at the wedding included Prince Henry, Duke of Gloucester, Princess Marina of Greece and Denmark, Duchess of Kent, and several other members of European royal families, including the two brothers of the groom, Prince Tomislav and Prince Andrew, the mother of the bride Princess Aspasia of Greece and Denmark, and Prince Bernhard of Lippe-Biesterfeld, Prince-Consort of the Netherlands. They had one son, Crown Prince Alexander, who was born on 17 July 1945.

The news that King Peter had married in wartime did much to discredit him with his people, and becoming very unsettled as it started to sink in that he might have sacrificed his throne for love, Peter became unusually open to British "advice" in early 1944. Churchill had announced in the House of Commons in May 1944 that Peter had dismissed Purić as Prime Minister and Mihailović as Chief of Staff and the new prime minister was Ivan Šubašić, when none of these things had actually happened.

After a week of strong British pressure, Peter capitulated and on 1 June 1944 appointed Šubašić prime minister. The mandate of the new Šubašić government was to form a coalition with Marshal Tito's People's Liberation Movement. On 10 June 1944, Šubašić flew to the island of Vis to meet Tito for talks, and on 16 June 1944 it was announced that the Partisans were the only recognized agents of the government-in-exile in Yugoslavia and the governing bodies set up by the Communists were the provisional government of Yugoslavia.

Šubašić did not consult with King Peter and presented the agreement with Tito as a fait accompli to the king. The cabinet announced by Šubašić was very left-wing and on 29 August 1944 Mihailović was dismissed as chief of staff. On 12 September 1944, King Peter went on the BBC to appeal to all his subjects to support Tito and warned that the "stigma of treason" would stick to those who refused this command. At the same time, Stalin, anxious to allay Western fears about the future of Eastern Europe, ordered a very reluctant Tito, in a meeting in Moscow, to allow Peter to return to Yugoslavia though with the advice that he "should slip a knife into his back at the appropriate moment".

== Deposition and exile ==
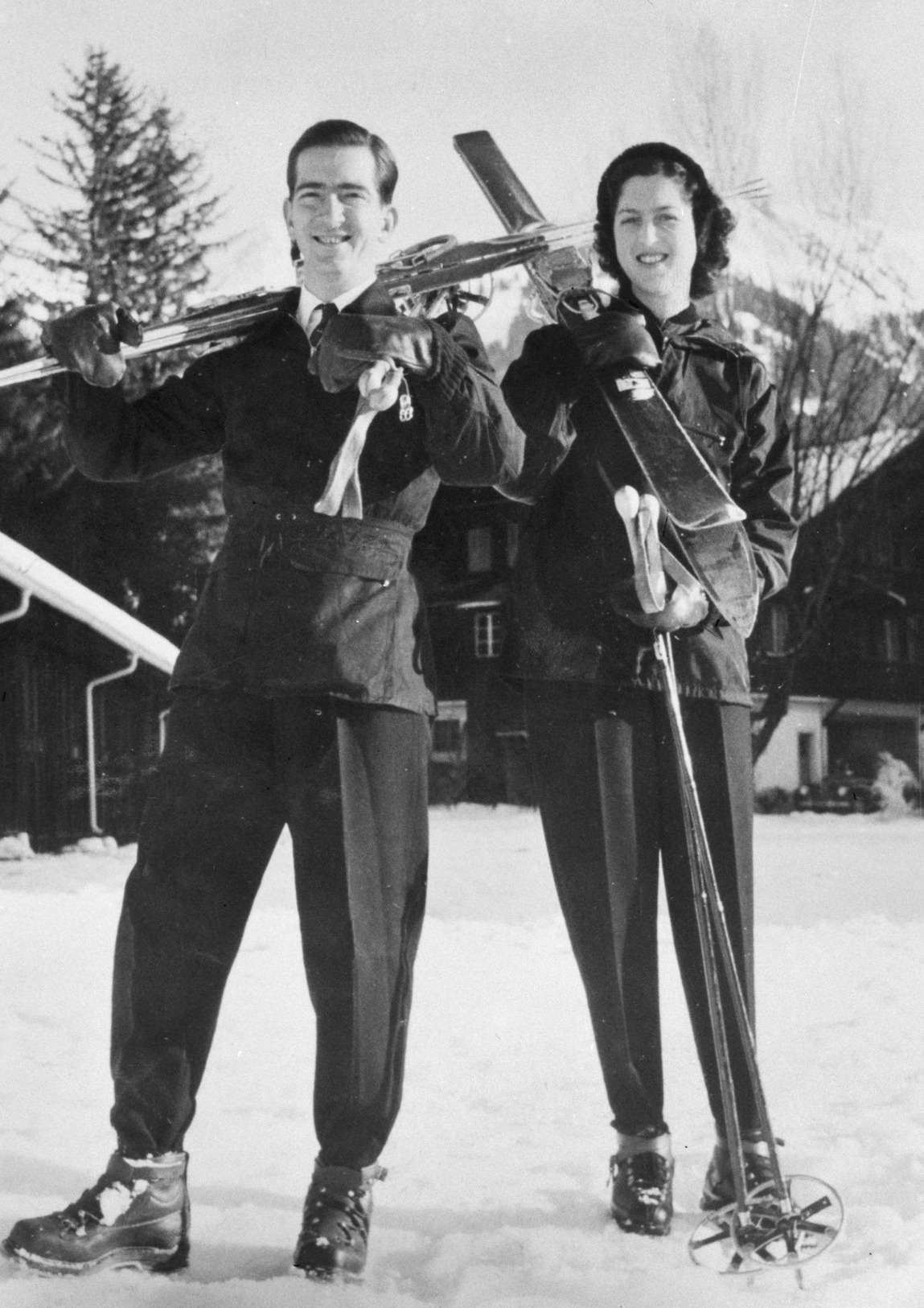
Peter and Alexandra

Although the war was over, Peter was not allowed to return home. Prime Minister Šubašić arrived in Belgrade in November 1944 and shortly afterwards, went to Moscow to negotiate an agreement with Stalin; that Peter would not be allowed to return until a plebiscite was held on if Yugoslavia should become a republic or remain a monarchy. Šubašić also agreed to Stalin's demand for a three-man regency council to govern until the plebiscite, which enraged Peter who noted that he was 21 years old and did not require a regent anymore.

Peter also objected to the regents who numbered 1 Croat, 1 Slovene and 1 Serb as they were all nominated by Tito, complaining the regents were biased against him. In March 1945, the regency council started to govern in Belgrade while a cabinet was formed what was now called the Democratic Federation of Yugoslavia numbering 28 men, of whom 23 were Partisans. The National Liberation Front government was in theory a coalition, but in fact it was a Communist-dominated regime with the non-Communist ministers there only as a "window dressing" to disguise the extent of Communist dominance.

The new government attempted to freeze Peter's assets abroad, claiming that they were stolen. Peter and Tito took to denouncing each other with Tito telling the press that he was creating a democracy in Yugoslavia while Peter accused him of creating a Communist dictatorship. In the elections for the constituent assembly on 11 November 1945, there was widespread voting fraud and intimidation; with opposition newspapers prevented from having the truth published by the government denying them a voice.

Peter was deposed by Yugoslavia's Communist Constituent Assembly on 29 November 1945 with Yugoslavia proclaimed a republic. After this declaration, he settled in the United States. In 1948, Peter visited Chicago, staying at the Drake Hotel, visited the Inland Steel works and Armour stockyards "where many Yugoslavs work" and spent much time at the Serbian Orthodox Seminary of St. Sava.

As a living former king of a European country, Peter was something of a novelty for Americans, and addressed various civic groups in the Midwest, for example in 1949 it was reported that the "young, modern, democratic monarch who refused to accept the situation in his country" spoke to the Kohler Woman's club in Sheboygan on the subject of "My kingdom for freedom". In 1951, Peter went on the Ford Festival TV show, where he was described as a "sad-eyed youth" who was "a flop as a TV personality" as he was noticeably nervous in front of the TV cameras and was quickly dismissed by the host, James Melton.

Up until his death, Peter continued to nurture hopes that one day he would be restored to the Yugoslav throne, in the words of the American journalist Peter Hockenos being a "forlorn figure" while "rival emigre groups drew the hapless king into their incessant schemings and quarrels. The royalist community resembled a bad caricature of a powerless, squabbling diaspora". A romantic, impractical man, Peter held to a completely unrealistic hope that there were still bands of Chetniks active in the rural areas of central Serbia who would rise up at the right moment when Peter led an army of emigres in an invasion of Yugoslavia, and together they would overthrow Marshal Tito.

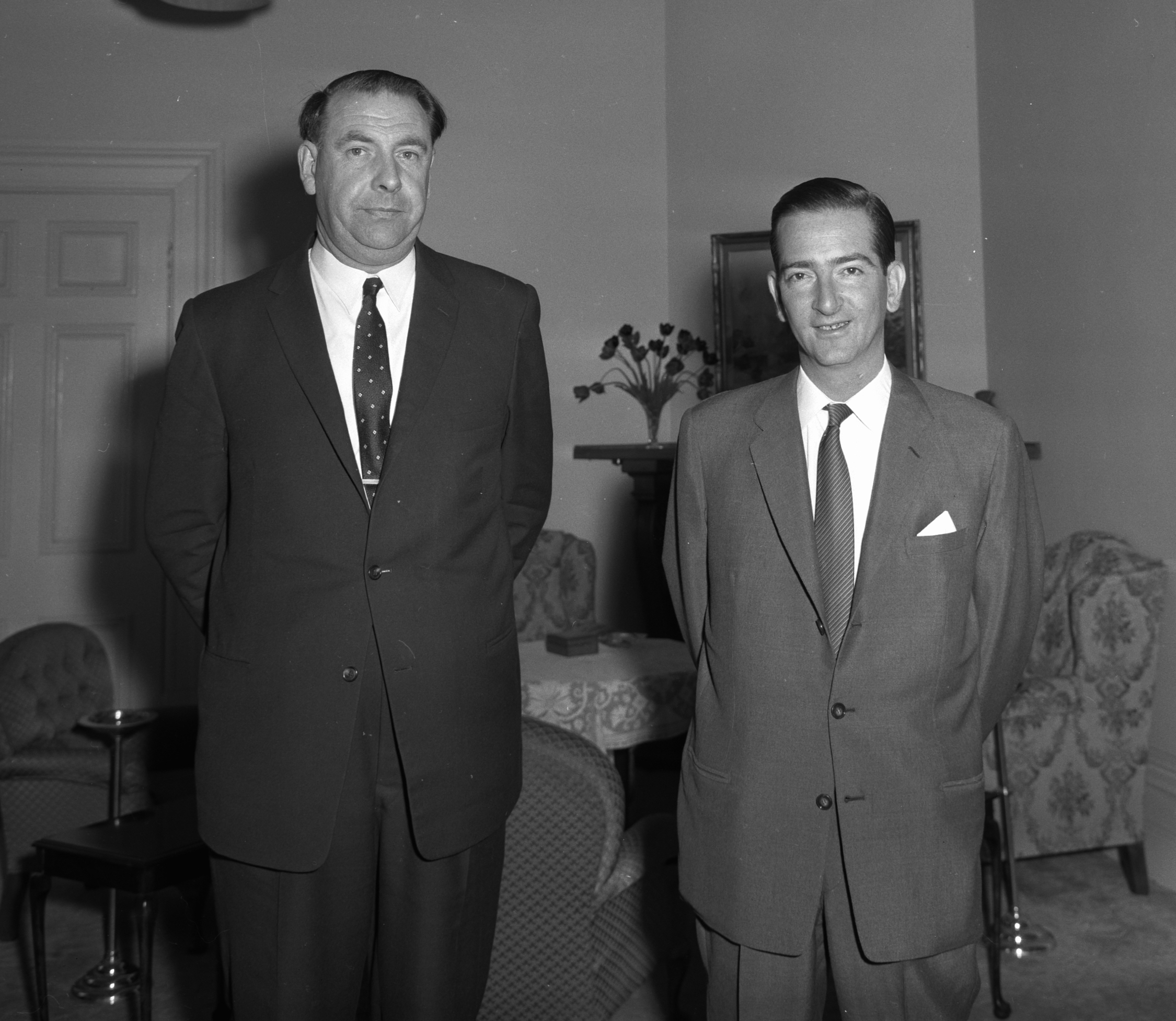
Peter and Mayor of Wellington Frank Kitts in 1960

In 1953, the Sunday Express newspaper in London reported that Peter, who was living in France, was suffering from "money tangles", had a "cheque bounce in Paris" and was involved in an "unpleasant scene" in a party in Biarritz hosted by the Marquis de Cuevas. Peter filed for divorce in 1953. He hired attorney René de Chambrun, the son-in-law of former Vichy French Prime Minister Pierre Laval. The couple reconciled in 1955.

While living in France in the 1950s, Peter, whose lifestyle was beyond his means, had a problem with the "bouncing cheques" he kept writing and which led him to being banned from the expensive French restaurants and hotels he loved so much, as he spent money that he did not have. The actress Ilka Chase, who met the former king and Queen Alexandra on the French Riviera in 1955, wrote:

Much of his behavior in futile pursuit of his lost throne was so shabby, ill-advised, and stupid as to seem incredible. I should think the poor devil would hate to see it in black and white, but apparently he did squander his entire fortune, accumulate staggering debts, desert his wife, lie to her, try to have their son taken from her, and in general behave in a manner far from loveable. But she loved him. After estrangement and desertion they once more are reunited and are living in a four-room apartment in Cannes, when I went to call on them. They are candid in explaining that their income is from Serbians living in exile who contribute weekly whatever they can spare so that their king and queen may maintain a home.

In 1956, Queen Alexandra published a memoir, For the Love of a King, which one American reviewer described as:

an impatient regret for the waste of talent and enormous sums of money such a useless upbringing permits and a sturdy swing toward that funny system derided by Europeans as the American way of life. In this time of agonized reappraisal of the evils of P.S. 102, the self-satisfaction this book will induce among its alumni is well worth reading it for.

In 1959, the Chicago Tribune reported about Peter's visit to the Chicago suburb of Waukegan:

The 34 year old monarch was greeted in a drizzling rain by Mayor Robert Sabonjian and City Clerk Howard Guthrie and taken through a marine engine plant and the city's new Thomas Jefferson Junior High school. He was treated to a dinner of Lake Michigan trout, with sturgeon and smoked chubs as appetizers, and pronounced the meal "most exquisite." The former king also met Waukegan's weather prophet, Mathon Kryitsis, a fisherman who for many years has forecast the severity of the winter by gauging the depth at which perch are feeding.

== Final years and death ==
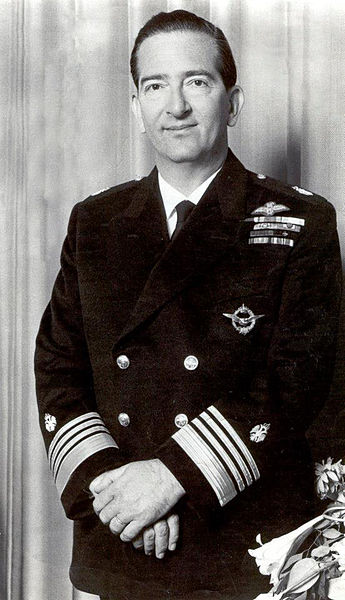
Peter II in 1966

From 1964 to his death Peter served as the Royal Patron of the Sovereign Military Order of the Temple of Jerusalem in the United States. In 1963, Alexandra, who was suffering from severe depression, tried to commit suicide. Peter himself suffered from depression and alcoholism, and his heavy drinking caused him to suffer from cirrhosis of the liver. As the Chicago area had a substantial Yugoslav immigrant population, Peter spent much of his exile in Chicago, where he maintained ties with anti-communist Serbian emigres, especially with the Serbian National Defense Council.

The Non-Aligned Movement of the Third World nations, which had as one of its leaders Marshal Tito of Yugoslavia, was felt to be useful for American foreign policy in the Cold War as being disruptive to the Soviet bloc, creating the example of a communist regime in eastern Europe that was independent of the Soviet Union. The United States did not wish to push Tito towards the Kremlin by supporting the Serb royalist movement.

In 1963, Peter told the Chicago Tribune: "The State Department has told me that I am a guest in your country, and so I must not discuss American foreign policy towards Yugoslavia." Instead, Peter frequently attended various civic events in the Chicago area, speaking at a fundraiser for the Knights of Malta in 1964, hosting the local meeting of the Alliance Francaise in 1965, attending a memorial for General Mihailović at the Milhailovich Memorial Home in 1966 and in 1967 attending an event for the Knights of Malta where he knighted "50 persons from Illinois, Iowa, Minnesota, and Wisconsin". In 1967, Peter took on a job for the first time in his life, working for the Sterling Savings & Loan Association in Los Angeles. When asked by the press if working for a living would hurt his image as a king, Peter replied: "I think it raises my stature a little."

After many years of suffering from cirrhosis, he died in Denver, Colorado, at Denver Health Medical Center on 3 November 1970, after a failed liver transplant. He was interred in Saint Sava Monastery Church at Libertyville, Illinois, the only European monarch so far to have been buried in the United States.

In the 1980s, the American soap opera Dynasty was shown on Yugoslav television. As one of the stars of Dynasty, the actress Catherine Oxenberg, is descended from the House of Karađorđević, being the granddaughter of the Prince Regent Paul, this sparked immense national pride in Serbia and by 1990 led to a major revival of popular interest in the House of Karađorđević, which was exploited by the regime of Slobodan Milošević to burnish its nationalist line. The revival of Karađorđević nostalgia led to something of a popular rehabilitation of King Peter, whose death in 1970 had been barely noticed in his homeland.

== Return of remains and state funeral ==
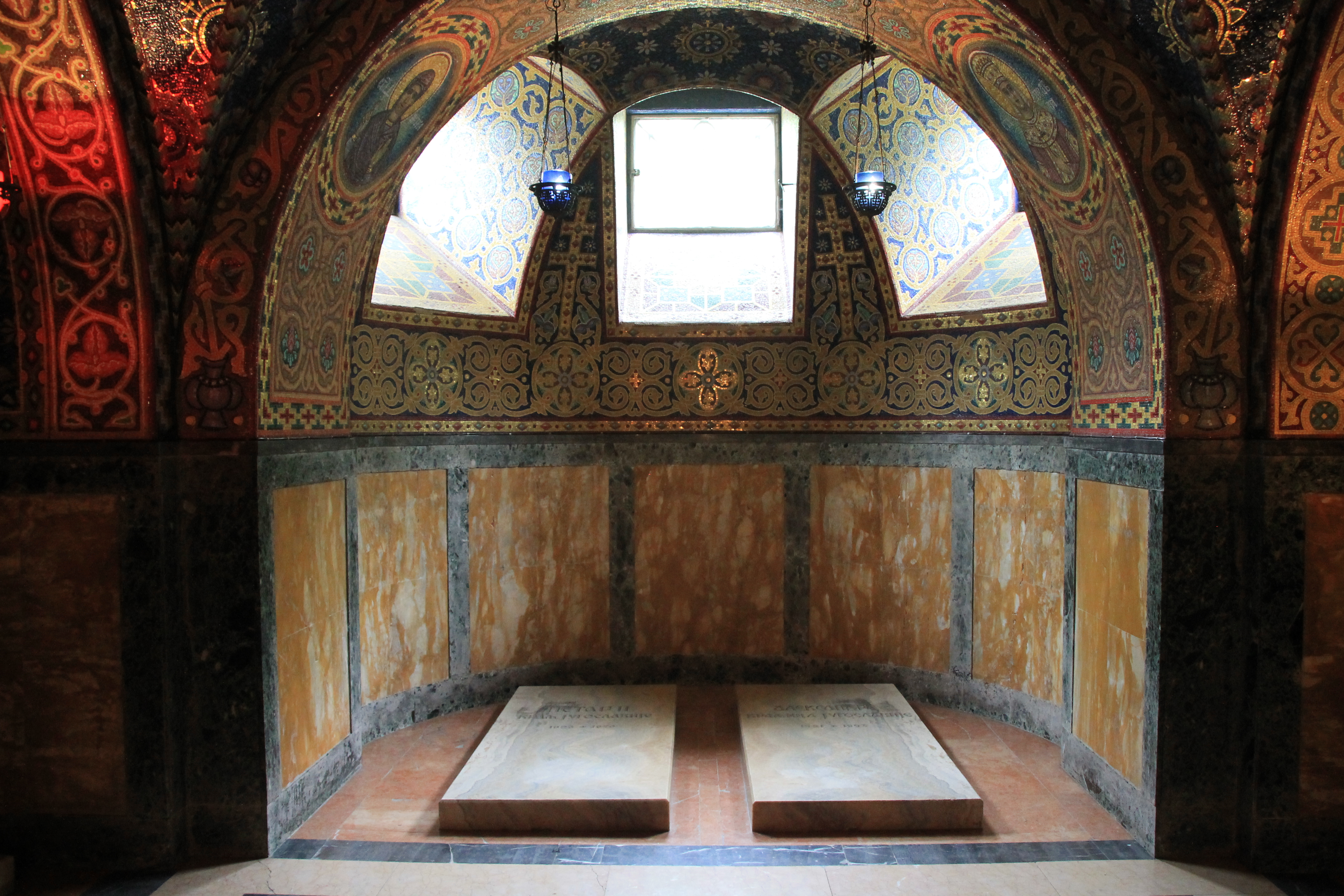
The graves of Peter and Alexandra in the crypt of St. George's Church in Oplenac, Serbia

On 4 March 2007, former Crown Prince Alexander announced plans to have his father's remains repatriated to Serbia. Peter II had chosen St. Sava Serbian Orthodox Monastery as his interim resting place because of the extenuating circumstances that afflicted his homeland. After talks with the Serbian government, the move was confirmed in January 2013 with the burial place being the Royal Family Mausoleum in Oplenac.

On 22 January 2013, Peter's remains were returned to Belgrade. He was laid in state in the Royal Chapel in Dedinje before being buried in the Royal Family Mausoleum at Oplenac on 26 May 2013 along with his wife, Queen Alexandra. His mother, Queen Maria, and his brother, Prince Andrej, lie nearby. The Serbian Royal Regalia were placed over Peter's coffin. Present at the return ceremony were the Prime Minister Ivica Dačić, Peter's son Alexander with his family, and Serbian Patriarch Irinej. The latter openly advocated for the restoration of the Serbian monarchy.

== Honours ==
Kingdom of Yugoslavia
Order of Saint Prince Lazarus, Sovereign and Collar
Order of Karađorđe's Star, Grand Master and Grand Cross
Order of Karađorđe's Star with Swords, Grand Master
Order of the White Eagle, Grand Master and Grand Cross
Order of the White Eagle with Swords, Grand Master
Order of the Yugoslav Crown, Grand Master and Grand Cross
Order of Saint Sava, Grand Master and Grand Cross
International and Foreign Awards
Legion of Honour, Grand Cross (France)
Order of the Redeemer, Grand Cross (Greece)
Order of the Most Holy Annunciation, Collar (Italy)
Order of Saints Maurice and Lazarus, Bailiff Grand Cross (Italy)
Order of the Crown of Italy, Knight Grand Cross (Italy)
Order of the White Lion, Collar (Czechoslovakia)
Constantinian Order of Saint George, Bailiff Grand Cross (Two Sicilies)
Order of Malta, Bailiff Grand Cross (SMOM)
Order pro merito Melitensi, Collar (SMOM)

Peter II of Yugoslavia House of Karađorđević Born: 6 September 1923 Died: 3 November 1970
Regnal titles
Preceded by Alexander I	King of Yugoslavia; 9 October 1934 – 29 November 1945	Monarchy abolished
Titles in pretence
Loss of title Communist Republic declared	— TITULAR — King of Yugoslavia; 29 November 1945 – 3 November 1970	Succeeded by Alexander
Political offices
Preceded by Prince Paul as Regent of Yugoslavia	Heads of state of Yugoslavia; 27 March 1941 – 29 November 1945¹	Succeeded by Ivan Ribar as President of the Presidium of the National Assembly
Notes and references
1. Reigned under the regency until the coup d'état on 27 March 1941
