= List of heads of state of Yugoslavia =

This article lists the heads of state of Yugoslavia from the creation of the Kingdom of Serbs, Croats and Slovenes (Kingdom of Yugoslavia) in 1918 until the breakup of the Socialist Federal Republic of Yugoslavia in 1992.

The Kingdom of Yugoslavia was a hereditary monarchy ruled by the House of Karađorđević from 1918 until World War II. After the war, SFR Yugoslavia was headed first by Ivan Ribar, the President of the Presidency of the National Assembly (the parliamentary speaker), and then by President Josip Broz Tito from 1953 up until his death in 1980. Afterwards, the Presidency of Yugoslavia assumed the role of a collective head of state, with the title of President of the Presidency of Yugoslavia rotating among the representatives of the republics and autonomous provinces that composed the Presidency. However, from the abolition of the monarchy until 1990 the President of the League of Communists was usually the most powerful position. Although the President of the League of Communists was automatically a member of the Presidency of Yugoslavia until 1988, only Tito ever headed both the League and the Presidency. With the introduction of multi-party system in 1990, individual republics elected their own heads of state, but the country's head of state continued to rotate among appointed representatives of republics and autonomous provinces until the country dissolved two years later.

== Kingdom of Yugoslavia ==
King of Yugoslavia
- Краљ Југославије; Kralj Jugoslavije
- Coat of arms of the Kingdom of Yugoslavia

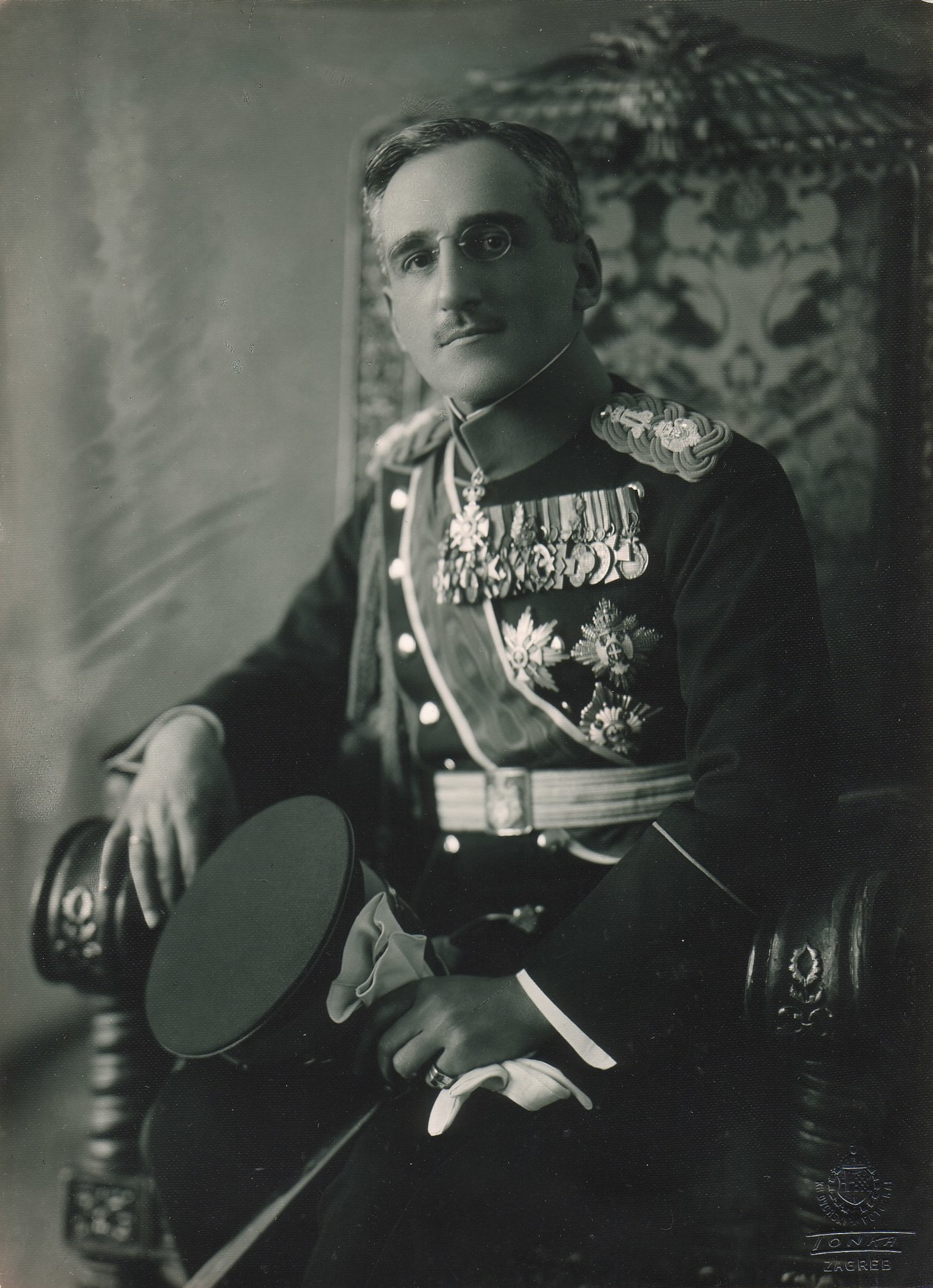
- Longest to reign Alexander; 16 August 1921 – 9 October 1934

Details
- Style: His Majesty
- First monarch: Peter I
- Last monarch: Peter II
- Formed: 1 December 1918; 107 years ago
- Abolished: 29 November 1945; 80 years ago
- Residences: Dedinje Royal Compound, Belgrade
- Appointer: Hereditary
- Pretender: Line of succession

The Kingdom of Serbs, Croats and Slovenes was created by the unification of the Kingdom of Serbia (the Kingdom of Montenegro had united with Serbia five days previously, while the regions of Kosovo, Vojvodina and Vardar Macedonia were parts of Serbia prior to the unification) and the provisional State of Slovenes, Croats and Serbs (itself formed from territories of the former Austria-Hungary) on 1 December 1918.

Until 6 January 1929, the Kingdom of Serbs, Croats and Slovenes was a parliamentary monarchy. On that day, King Alexander abolished the Vidovdan Constitution (adopted in 1921), prorogued the National Assembly and introduced a personal dictatorship (so-called 6 January Dictatorship). He officially renamed the country Kingdom of Yugoslavia on 3 October 1929 and, although granted the 1931 Constitution, continued to rule as a de facto absolute monarch until his assassination on 9 October 1934, during a state visit to France. After his assassination, parliamentary monarchy was put back in place.

The Kingdom of Yugoslavia was defeated and occupied on 17 April 1941 after the German invasion. The monarchy was formally abolished and the republic proclaimed on 29 November 1945.

All monarchs were members of the Karađorđević dynasty. Peter I, previously King of Serbia (since the May Coup in 1903 against the Obrenović dynasty), was proclaimed King by representatives of South Slav states. The royal family continued through his son (Alexander) and his grandson (Peter II).

=== List ===
Denotes an acting head of state

| Name Reign | Portrait | Birth | Marriages | Death | Succession right | Note |
|---|---|---|---|---|---|---|
| Peter I Петар I 1 December 1918 – 16 August 1921 (2 years, 259 days) | Peter I of Serbs, Croats and Slovenes | 29 June 1844; Belgrade Son of Alexander Karađorđević, Prince of Serbia and Persida Nenadović | Princess Zorka of Montenegro; 30 July 1883; 5 children | 16 August 1921; Belgrade aged 77 | Previously King of Serbia (June 15, 1903 – December 1, 1918), proclaimed King by representatives of South Slav states | Held the title "King of Serbs, Croats and Slovenes". Prince Alexander served as regent in his final years. |
| Alexander I Александар I 16 August 1921 – 9 October 1934 (13 years, 55 days) | Alexander I of Yugoslavia | 16 December 1888; Cetinje Son of Peter I and Princess Zorka of Montenegro | Maria of Yugoslavia; 8 June 1922; 3 children | 9 October 1934; Marseille aged 45 | Son of the preceding | Changed title to "King of Yugoslavia" in 1929. Assassinated in Marseille. |
| Paul; Павле 9 October 1934 – 27 March 1941 (6 years, 170 days) | Prince Paul of Yugoslavia | 27 April 1893; Saint Petersburg Son of Prince Arsen of Yugoslavia and Aurora Pavlovna Demidova | Olga of Greece and Denmark; 22 October 1923; 3 children | 14 September 1976; Paris aged 83 | Cousin of the preceding | Served as regent for Peter II, together with Radenko Stanković and Ivo Perović. |
| Peter II; Петар II 9 October 1934 – 29 November 1945 (11 years, 52 days) | Peter II of Yugoslavia | 6 September 1923; Belgrade Son of Alexander and Maria of Yugoslavia | Alexandra of Greece and Denmark; 20 March 1944; 1 child | 3 November 1970; Denver aged 47 | Son of the preceding | Reigned under the regency until the coup d'état on 27 March 1941; exiled on 17 April 1941 and deposed on 29 November 1945. |

== SFR Yugoslavia ==
President of Yugoslavia
- Председник Југославије; Predsednik Jugoslavije
- Standard of the President

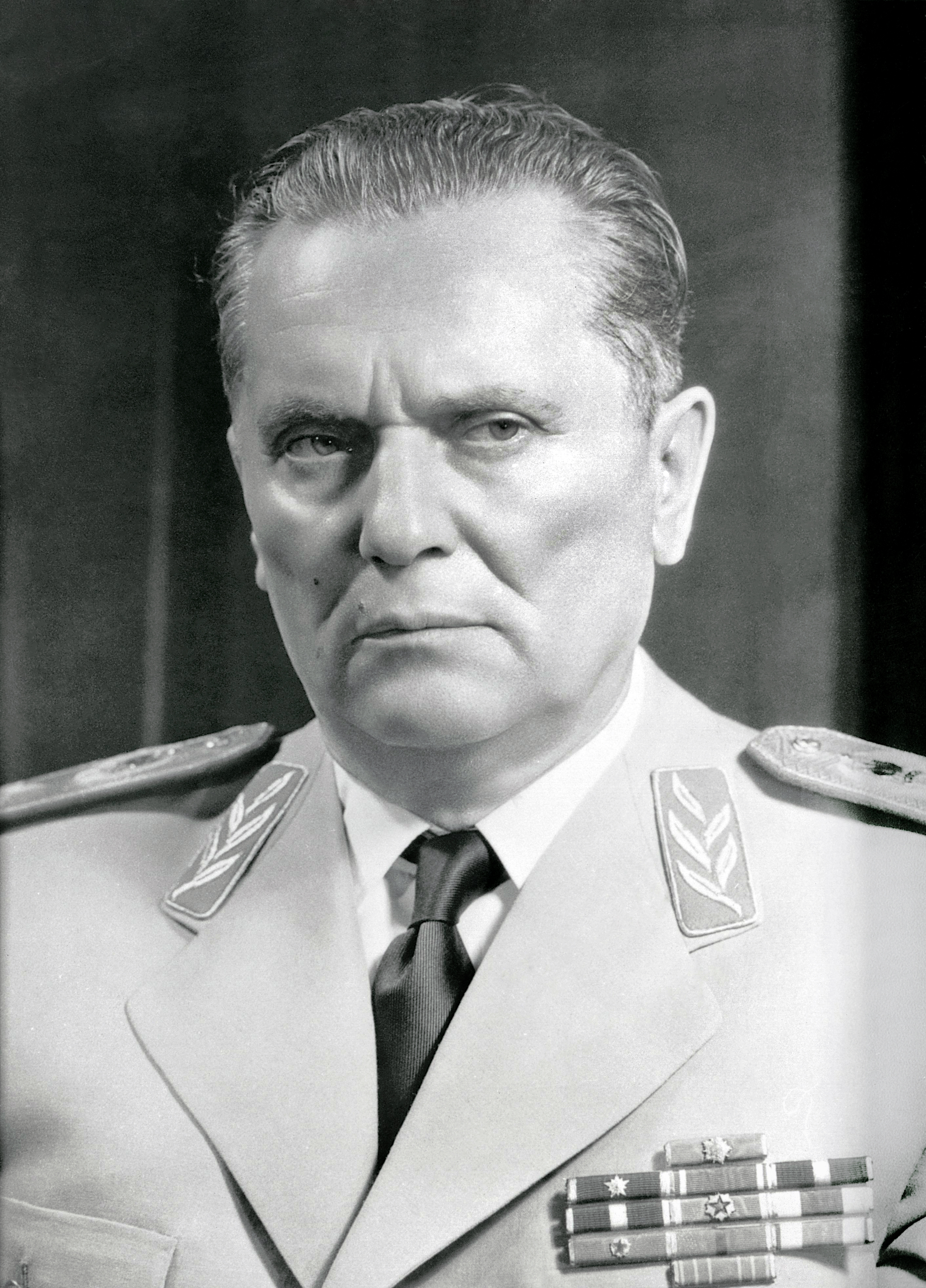
- Longest serving Josip Broz Tito; 14 January 1953 – 4 May 1980
- Residence: White Palace, Belgrade
- Precursor: King of Yugoslavia
- Formation: 1 December 1945; 80 years ago
- First holder: Ivan Ribar
- Final holder: Stjepan Mesić
- Abolished: 5 December 1991; 34 years ago
- Superseded by: President of Croatia; President of Serbia and Montenegro; Chairman of the Presidency of Bosnia and Herzegovina; President of North Macedonia; President of Slovenia
- Deputy: Deputy Head of State

After the German invasion and fragmentation of the Kingdom of Yugoslavia, partisans formed the Anti-Fascist Council for the National Liberation of Yugoslavia (AVNOJ) in 1942. On 29 November 1943 an AVNOJ conference proclaimed the Democratic Federal Yugoslavia, while negotiations with the royal government in exile continued, the two later merging with the conclusion of the Vis Agreement in June 1944. After the liberation of Belgrade on 20 October 1944, the Communist-led government on 29 November 1945 declared King Peter II deposed and proclaimed the Federal People's Republic of Yugoslavia.

From 1945 to 1953, the President of the Presidency of the National Assembly was the office of the Yugoslav head of state. The post was held by Ivan Ribar.

From 1953 to 1963, Josip Broz Tito simultaneously held the offices of the President of the Republic (head of state) and the President of the Federal Executive Council (head of government), which were combined under the terms of a recent constitutional amendment. The 1963 Constitution renamed the state as Socialist Federal Republic of Yugoslavia, and divided the office of the President of the Republic from that of President of the Federal Council, even if the President of the Republic retained the power to preside over the Government when it met, on the French model.

The 1974 Constitution provided for a collective federal presidency, consisting of representatives of the six republics, the two autonomous provinces within Serbia and (until 1988) the President of the League of Communists, with a chairman in rotation. Notwithstanding, this constitutional provision was suspended because Tito was elected by parliament as President for Life, who thus chaired the collective presidency on a permanent basis. After his death in 1980, one member was annually elected President of the Presidency and performed many of the personal duties expected of a president, though the collective presidency as a whole remained head of state.

=== List ===
Communist Party / League of Communists
Liberal Democracy of Slovenia
Socialist Party of Serbia
Croatian Democratic Union
Democratic Party of Socialists of Montenegro
Denotes an acting head of state

| No. | Portrait | Name (Birth–Death) | Representing | Term of office | | | Party | Notes |
| No. | Portrait | Name (Birth–Death) | Representing | Took office | Left office | Time in office | Party | Notes |
|---|---|---|---|---|---|---|---|---|
President of the Presidency of the National Assembly; 1945–1953
| 1 | | Ivan Ribar; Иван Рибар (1881–1968) | — | 1 December 1945 | 14 January 1953 | 7 years, 44 days | Communist Party of Yugoslavia | Communist Party of Yugoslavia (KPJ) reformed and renamed League of Communists of Yugoslavia (SKJ) in 1952. |
President; 1953–1980
| 1 (2) | | Josip Broz Tito; Јосип Броз Тито (1892–1980) | — | 14 January 1953 | 4 May 1980 | 27 years, 111 days | League of Communists of Yugoslavia | Declared president for life in 1974. Died in office. |
Presidents of the Presidency; 1980–1992
| 1 (3) | | Lazar Koliševski; Лазар Колишевски (1914–2000) | SR Macedonia | 4 May 1980 | 15 May 1980 | 11 days | League of Communists of Yugoslavia | |
| 2 (4) | | Cvijetin Mijatović; Цвијетин Мијатовић (1913–1999) | SR Bosnia and Herzegovina | 15 May 1980 | 15 May 1981 | 1 year | League of Communists of Yugoslavia | |
| 3 (5) | | Sergej Kraigher; Сергеј Крајгер (1914–2001) | SR Slovenia | 15 May 1981 | 15 May 1982 | 1 year | League of Communists of Yugoslavia | |
| 4 (6) | | Petar Stambolić; Петар Стамболић (1912–2007) | SR Serbia | 15 May 1982 | 15 May 1983 | 1 year | League of Communists of Yugoslavia | |
| 5 (7) | | Mika Špiljak; Мика Шпиљак (1916–2007) | SR Croatia | 15 May 1983 | 15 May 1984 | 1 year | League of Communists of Yugoslavia | |
| 6 (8) | | Veselin Đuranović; Веселин Ђурановић (1925–1997) | SR Montenegro | 15 May 1984 | 15 May 1985 | 1 year | League of Communists of Yugoslavia | |
| 7 (9) | | Radovan Vlajković; Радован Влајковић (1924–2001) | SAP Vojvodina | 15 May 1985 | 15 May 1986 | 1 year | League of Communists of Yugoslavia | |
| 8 (10) | | Sinan Hasani; Синан Хасани (1922–2010) | SAP Kosovo | 15 May 1986 | 15 May 1987 | 1 year | League of Communists of Yugoslavia | |
| 9 (11) | | Lazar Mojsov; Лазар Мојсов (1920–2011) | SR Macedonia | 15 May 1987 | 15 May 1988 | 1 year | League of Communists of Yugoslavia | |
| 10 (12) | | Raif Dizdarević; Раиф Диздаревић (1926–2026) | SR Bosnia and Herzegovina | 15 May 1988 | 15 May 1989 | 1 year | League of Communists of Yugoslavia | |
| 11 (13) | | Janez Drnovšek; Јанез Дрновшек (1950–2008) | SR Slovenia | 15 May 1989 | 15 May 1990 | 1 year | League of Communists of Yugoslavia | Joined Liberal Democracy of Slovenia in February 1990. |
| | | Janez Drnovšek; Јанез Дрновшек (1950–2008) | SR Slovenia | 15 May 1989 | 15 May 1990 | 1 year | Liberal Democracy of Slovenia | Joined Liberal Democracy of Slovenia in February 1990. |
| 12 (14) | | Borisav Jović; Борисав Јовић (1928–2021) | SR Serbia; R Serbia | 15 May 1990 | 15 May 1991 | 1 year | League of Communists of Yugoslavia | Joined Socialist Party of Serbia in July 1990. |
| | | Borisav Jović; Борисав Јовић (1928–2021) | SR Serbia; R Serbia | 15 May 1990 | 15 May 1991 | 1 year | Socialist Party of Serbia | Joined Socialist Party of Serbia in July 1990. |
| – | | Sejdo Bajramović; Сејдо Бајрамовић (1927–1993) | — | 16 May 1991 | 30 June 1991 | 45 days | Socialist Party of Serbia | Acting president. |
| 13 (15) | | Stjepan Mesić; Стјепан Месић (born 1934) | R Croatia | 30 June 1991 | 5 December 1991 | 158 days | Croatian Democratic Union | Former member of League of Communists of Yugoslavia. Last president of SFR Yugoslavia. |
| – | | Branko Kostić; Бранко Костић (1939–2020) | — | 5 December 1991 | 15 June 1992 | 193 days | Democratic Party of Socialists of Montenegro | Acting president. Installed by Serbia and Montenegro. |

== See also ==
- List of Yugoslav regents
- List of deputy heads of state of Yugoslavia
- Prime Minister of Yugoslavia
- Leader of the League of Communists of Yugoslavia
- President of Serbia and Montenegro
- Presidency of Bosnia and Herzegovina
  - Chairman of the Presidency of Bosnia and Herzegovina
- President of Croatia
  - List of presidents of Croatia
- President of Montenegro
  - List of presidents of Montenegro
  - List of heads of state of Montenegro
- President of North Macedonia
- President of Serbia
  - List of presidents of Serbia
  - List of heads of state of Serbia
- President of Slovenia
