= Radoje Knežević =

Serbian politician and coup d'état organizer

Professor Radoje Knežević
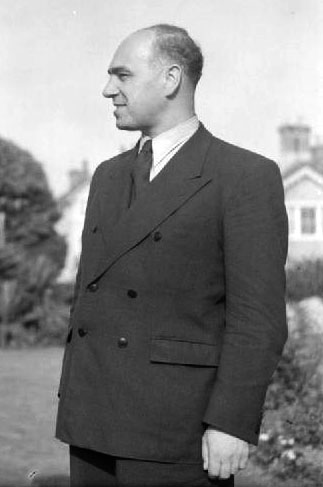
- Radoje Knežević in England in June 1941

Minister of the Royal Court
- In office 27 March 1941 – June 1943
- Monarch: Peter II of Yugoslavia
- Prime Minister: Dušan Simović to 9 January 1942
- Prime Minister: Slobodan Jovanović from 11 January 1942

Personal details
- Born: 20 August 1901 Stragari, Kingdom of Serbia
- Died: 22 June 1983 (aged 81) Montreal, Quebec, Canada
- Resting place: Mount Royal Cemetery
- Relations: Živan Knežević (brother)

Radoje Knežević (Serbian Cyrillic: Радоје Кнежевић; 20 August 1901 – 22 June 1983) was a key member of the group that organised the Yugoslav coup d'état of 27 March 1941 that deposed the regency of Prince Paul, Dr. Radenko Stanković and Dr. Ivo Perović, along with the government of Prime Minister Dragiša Cvetković. Following the coup he was appointed as the Minister of the Royal Court, and after the resulting invasion of Yugoslavia, he accompanied the King and government into exile in Cairo then London. Along with his brother Živan Knežević, he was a member of the so-called "League of Majors", which was at the centre of the ill-fated Greater Serbian agenda of the Yugoslav government-in-exile and who was instrumental in having Draža Mihailović appointed as Chief of Staff of the Yugoslav Supreme Command. He was sidelined in June 1943 when he was appointed to the Yugoslav legation in Portugal. He remained in exile after the war, was sentenced to 10 years imprisonment with hard labour in absentia during the Belgrade Process conducted by the country's newly established communist authorities, and emigrated to Canada where he lived until his death in 1983.

== Early life ==
Radoje Knežević was born on 20 August 1901 in the village of Stragari, near Kragujevac, Kingdom of Serbia. He was the son of Lazar and Mileva Knežević (née Veljković). Prior to the outbreak of World War II, he was a professor in Belgrade, and had been a French-language tutor to Prince Peter. He was also a prominent member of the Serbian Cultural Club. Knežević was married, and had two children.

== Role in the coup ==
Knežević, his brother Živan and their fellow plotters, led by Royal Yugoslav Air Force (Serbo-Croatian Latin: Vazduhoplovstvo Vojske Kraljevine Jugoslavije, VVKJ) Brigadier General Borivoje Mirković declared the 17-year-old Prince Peter to be of age and brought to power a government of national unity led by VVKJ General Dušan Simović. Knežević was a member of the National Committee of the almost exclusively Serbian Democratic Party, as well as a friend of Mirković. He was resolutely anti-Axis and remained as Minister of the Royal Court in the Simović government. The coup resulted in the German-led Axis invasion of Yugoslavia commencing on 6 April 1941, during which the armed forces of Yugoslavia were defeated within eleven days. Fleeing the country by air, Knežević remained with King Peter as Minister of the Royal Court, and was part of the Yugoslav government-in-exile in London.

== Yugoslav government-in-exile ==
On 17 December 1941, King Peter gave a speech to a British audience in which he gave credit for the coup to younger and middle-ranking officers of the Yugoslav Army, and did not mention either Simović or Mirković at all. As Minister of the Royal Court, Knežević may well have ghost-written this speech for the king. In early 1942, the government-in-exile led by Simović was split along ethnic lines, with Knežević and his brother Živan forming part of an inner circle of anti-Simović advisers around King Peter, known as the "League of Majors". Under the influence of this group, and on advice from the rest of the cabinet, the king dismissed Simović and appointed Slobodan Jovanović as prime minister. The group of younger officers wanted to ensure that they would have a "direct share in power" with the Chetnik leader Brigadier General Draža Mihailović in a Chetnik-dominated government after the war had ended. Achieving this objective required the removal of the senior coup plotters Simović, Minister of the Army and Chief of Staff of the Supreme Command General Bogoljub Ilić, and Mirković, who was the Chief of the VVKJ in exile. These three officers had the support of almost all the officers of the VVKJ and most of the exiled colonels. Mirković and the Chief of Military Intelligence Colonel Žarko Popović also had good connections with British military intelligence and the Special Operations Executive from their close liaison before and during the coup. Both Ilić and Mirković were based in Cairo with the remnants of the Yugoslav forces that had fled the country in the face of the invasion.

As soon as the new cabinet met for the first time, both Simović and Ilić were dismissed from their ministerial posts, and Ilić and Mirković were also dismissed from their respective positions as Chief of Staff of the Supreme Command and Air Force respectively. Jovanović created a new portfolio for Mihailović as Minister of the Army, Navy and Air Force. Ilić and Mirković disputed their dismissal, which was seen by the government as open mutiny, and has become known in Yugoslav historiography as the "Scandal of Cairo". The government placed Ilić and Mirković on the retired list, and appointed another of the coup plotters and member of the "League of Majors" Lieutenant Colonel Miodrag Lozić as acting Chief of Staff of the Supreme Command, despite the fact that there were four generals and eight colonels in exile who outranked him. On 5 March 1942, his first day in the role, Lozić asked the British to remove Mirković and his supporters from Cairo and hand over several others, including Popović, to Yugoslav authorities for court martial on charges of mutiny. In response the British ordered Lozić to vacate his post and appointed Lieutenant General Robert Stone, the Commander of British Troops in Egypt, as acting Chief of Staff of the Yugoslav Supreme Command. The government-in-exile sent Colonel Miodrag Rakić to Cairo to resolve the situation, and on 7 May the British transferred the role of acting Chief of Staff of the Yugoslav Supreme Command to Rakić. In June the government-in-exile transferred the post of Chief of Staff of the Yugoslav Supreme Command to Yugoslavia and appointed Mihailović to the position. Mirković and his supporters were given the opportunity to transfer into British service in theatres away from the Balkans. The "Scandal of Cairo" constituted at least a partial victory for the Jovanović government and "League of Majors" but the whole affair damaged the relationship of the government-in-exile with the Western Allies and negatively affected potential aid to Mihailović. Historian Jozo Tomasevich considered it a serious setback for the Great Serbian forces in exile and that it "contributed substantially to the downfall" of Mihailović.

The British ambassador to the Yugoslav government-in-exile from July 1941 until August 1943, George William Rendel, was very conscious of the power wielded by Knežević, noting that he was "by no means working in harmony with the government". A wartime British intelligence handbook described the Knežević brothers as "the most powerful forces in the exiled Yugoslav Government and the most instrumental in carrying through its chauvinistic Great Serb and anti-Partisan policy". In June 1943 Jovanović was replaced as prime minister by Miloš Trifunović who replaced Knežević, appointing him as chargé d'affaires at the Yugoslav legation in Lisbon, Portugal. This removed Knežević from political power and from a position of influence over King Peter.

== Post-war ==
After the war, Knežević remained in exile and was tried in absentia alongside others. He was found guilty of treason and war crimes and sentenced to 10 years imprisonment with hard labour, loss of political and civic rights for 5 years, confiscation of all property, and loss of citizenship. The sentence of imprisonment with hard labour was to commence from the date of his future arrest. He emigrated to Canada where he was the editor of Glas kanadskih Srba (Voice of the Canadian Serbs). In the early 1950s, an acrimonious dispute arose between Cvetković and Knežević. Knežević wrote an article in the international relations journal International Affairs claiming that Prince Paul and Cvetković had formulated a secret plan to ally Yugoslavia with Germany and to gain control of the port of Salonika while Greece was defending against the Italian invasion. While Cvetković issued two strong denials in the historical journal Dokumenti o Jugoslaviji, and stated that seizing Salonika had never been on the agenda of the Yugoslav government, his latter statement was not true. The main purpose of Knežević's allegation was to discredit Prince Paul and portray the coup plotters in a favourable light.

Knežević moved to Montreal to join his daughter (Ljiljana Tomić) and died there on 22 June 1983.
