= Yugoslav coup d'état =

1941 deposition of Regent Prince Paul; installation of King Peter II

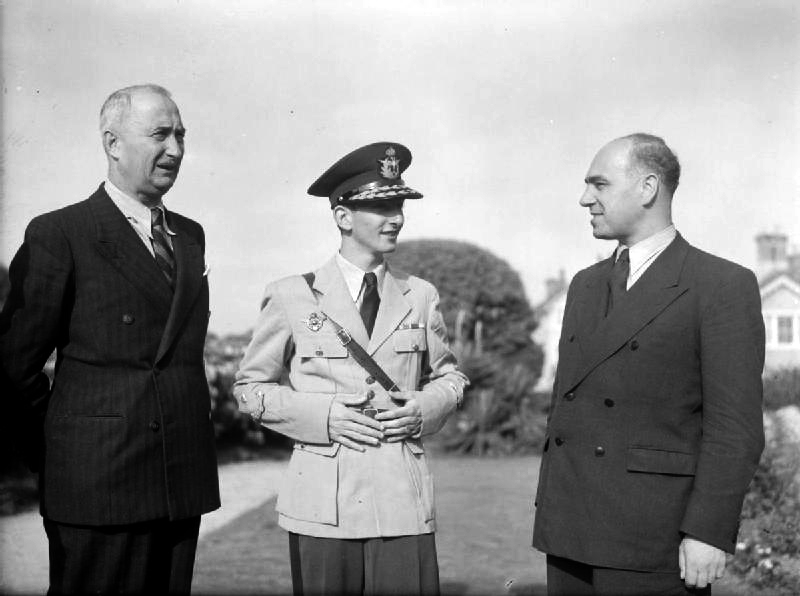
- Dušan Simović, King Peter II of Yugoslavia, and Radoje Knežević in London, June 1941. Peter II was declared of age and placed on the throne as a result of the coup.
- Date: 27 March 1941
- Location: Belgrade, Kingdom of Yugoslavia
- Outcome: Coup successful: Removal of regent Prince Paul and his government; Installation of national unity government under the minor King Peter II and headed by General Dušan Simović; Provocation of the Axis invasion of Yugoslavia
- Deaths: 1 (accidental)

A coup d'état took place on 27 March 1941 in Belgrade, Kingdom of Yugoslavia, when the regency led by Prince Paul of Yugoslavia was overthrown and King Peter II assumed full monarchical powers. The coup was planned and conducted by a group of pro-Western Serbian nationalist Royal Yugoslav Air Force officers formally led by the Air Force commander, General Dušan Simović, who had been associated with several putsch plots from 1938 onwards. Brigadier General of Military Aviation Borivoje Mirković, Major Živan Knežević of the Yugoslav Royal Guards, and his brother Radoje Knežević were the main organisers of the overthrow of the government. In addition to Radoje Knežević, some other civilian leaders were probably aware of the plot before it was launched and moved to support it once it occurred, but they were not among the organisers. Peter II himself was surprised by the coup, and heard of the declaration of his coming-of-age for the first time on the radio.

The Communist Party of Yugoslavia played no part in the coup, although it made a significant contribution to the mass street protests in many cities that signalled popular support for it. The putsch was successful and deposed the three-member Yugoslav regency (Prince Paul, Radenko Stanković and Ivo Perović) and the government of Prime Minister Dragiša Cvetković. Two days prior to its ousting, the Cvetković government had signed the Vienna Protocol on the accession of Yugoslavia to the Tripartite Pact (Axis). The coup had been planned for several months, but the signing of the pact spurred the organisers to carry it out, encouraged by the British Special Operations Executive.

The military conspirators brought to power the 17-year-old King Peter II (whom they declared to be of age to assume the throne) and formed a weak and divided national unity government with Simović as prime minister and Vladko Maček and Slobodan Jovanović as his vice-premiers. The coup led directly to the German-led Axis invasion of Yugoslavia in April 1941. The importance of the putsch and subsequent invasion in delaying Operation Barbarossa, the Axis invasion of the Soviet Union (which started on 22 June 1941), is still open to debate. In 1972 military historian Martin van Creveld dismissed the idea, affirming that the invasion of Yugoslavia actually assisted and hastened the overall Balkan campaign, and that other factors determined the start date for Operation Barbarossa. Other academics have asserted that the invasion of Yugoslavia contributed to a delay in the launching of Operation Barbarossa.

== Background ==
The Kingdom of Yugoslavia, formed in 1918 under the name Kingdom of Serbs, Croats and Slovenes, incorporated diverse national and religious groups with varied historical backgrounds. These included Serbs, Croats, Slovenes, Montenegrins, Bosnian Muslims, Macedonians and Albanians, among others. Each of these national groups was strongly associated with one of the three dominant religions: the Serbian Orthodox Church (Serbs, Montenegrins and Macedonians); the Catholic Church (Croats and Slovenes); and Islam (Bosnian Muslims and Albanians). The religious diversity deepened the divisions within Yugoslav society. Serbs and Montenegrins made up 38.8 per cent of the population, Croats contributed 23.9 per cent, Slovenes 8.5 per cent, Bosnian Muslims 6.3 per cent, Macedonians 5.3 per cent, and Albanians 4 per cent.

According to economics professor and historian Jozo Tomasevich, Yugoslavia was politically weak from the moment of its creation and remained so during the interwar period mainly due to a "rigid system of centralism" imposed by the Serb-friendly Vidovdan Constitution, the aforementioned strong association between each national group and its dominant religion, and uneven economic development. In particular, the religious primacy of the Serbian Orthodox Church in national affairs and discrimination against Catholics and Muslims compounded the dissatisfaction of the non-Serb population with the Serb-dominated ruling groups that controlled patronage and government appointments, and treated non-Serbs as second-class citizens. This centralised system arose from Serb military strength and Croatian intransigence, and was sustained by Croat disengagement, Serb overrepresentation, corruption, and a lack of discipline within political parties. This state of affairs was initially maintained by subverting the democratic system of government through political bribery. The domination of the rest of Yugoslavia by Serb ruling elites meant that the country was never consolidated in the political sense, and was therefore never able to address the social and economic challenges it faced.

The political scientist Sabrina P. Ramet sees the dysfunctionality and lack of legitimacy of the regime as the reasons why the kingdom's internal politics became ethnically polarised, a phenomenon that has been referred to as the "national question" in Yugoslavia. Failures to establish the rule of law, to protect individual rights, to build tolerance and equality, and to guarantee the neutrality of the state in matters relating to religion, language and culture contributed to this illegitimacy and the resulting instability.

Banovina created by King Alexander in 1929

In 1929, democracy was abandoned and a royal dictatorship was established by King Alexander, who attempted to break down the ethnic divisions in the country through various means, including creating administrative divisions (Serbo-Croatian Latin: banovine) based on rivers rather than traditional regions. There was significant opposition to this move, with Serbian and Slovene opposition parties and figures advocating the division of Yugoslavia into six ethnically based administrative units. By 1933, discontent in the largely Croat-populated Sava Banovina had developed into full-blown civil disorder, which the regime countered with a series of assassinations, attempted assassinations and arrests of key Croat opposition figures including the leader of the Croatian Peasant Party (Serbo-Croatian Latin: Hrvatska seljačka stranka, HSS) Vladko Maček. When Alexander was assassinated in Marseille in 1934 by a Bulgarian assassin with links to the Croat ultranationalists, the Ustaše, his cousin Prince Paul headed a triumvirate regency whose other members were the senator Radenko Stanković and the governor of the Sava Banovina, Ivo Perović. The regency ruled on behalf of Alexander's 11-year-old son, King Peter, but the important member of the regency was Prince Paul. Although Prince Paul was more liberal than his cousin, the dictatorship continued uninterrupted. The dictatorship had allowed the country to follow a consistent foreign policy, but Yugoslavia needed peace at home in order to assure peace with its neighbours, all of whom had irredentist designs on its territory.

== Yugoslav foreign policy during the interwar period ==
From 1921, the country had negotiated the Little Entente with Romania and Czechoslovakia in the face of Hungarian designs on its territory, and after a decade of bilateral treaties, had formalised the arrangements in 1933. This had been followed the next year by the Balkan Pact of Yugoslavia, Greece, Romania and Turkey, aimed at thwarting Bulgarian aspirations. Throughout this period, the Yugoslav government had sought to remain good friends with France, seeing her as a guarantor of European peace treaties. This was formalised through a treaty of friendship signed in 1927. With these arrangements in place, Italy posed the biggest problem for Yugoslavia, funding the anti-Yugoslav Internal Macedonian Revolutionary Organisation which promoted Bulgarian irredentism. Attempts by King Alexander to negotiate with Benito Mussolini fell on deaf ears, and after Alexander's assassination, nothing of note happened on that front until 1937. In the aftermath of Alexander's assassination, Yugoslavia was isolated both militarily and diplomatically, and reached out to France to assist its bilateral relationship with Italy. With the appointment of Milan Stojadinović as prime minister in 1935, Germany and Yugoslavia became more closely aligned. The trade relationship between the two countries also developed considerably, and Germany became Yugoslavia's most important trading partner.

=== Cvetković–Maček Agreement ===
Prince Paul recognised the lack of national solidarity and political weakness of his country, and after he assumed power he made repeated attempts to negotiate a political settlement with Maček, the leader of the dominant Croat political party in Yugoslavia, the HSS. In January 1937, Stojadinović met with Maček at Prince Paul's request, but Stojadinović was unwilling or unable to grapple with the issue of Croat dissatisfaction with a Yugoslavia dominated by the Serb ruling class. In 1938, the Anschluss brought the Third Reich to the borders of Yugoslavia, and early elections were held in December. In this background, the Royal Yugoslav Air Force (VVKJ) commander, General Dušan Simović, had been involved in two coup plots in early 1938 driven by Serb opposition to the Concordat with the Vatican, and another coup plot following the December election.

In the December 1938 Yugoslavian parliamentary election, the United Opposition led by Maček had attracted 44.9 per cent of the vote, but due to the electoral rules by which the government parties received 40 per cent of the seats in the National Assembly before votes were counted, the opposition vote only translated into 67 seats out of a total of 373. On 3 February 1939, the Minister of Education, Bogoljub Kujundžić, made a nationalist speech in the Assembly in which he stated that "Serb policies will always be the policies of this house and this government." Head of the Yugoslav Muslim Organization (JMO) Mehmed Spaho asked Stojadinović to disavow the statement, but he did not. At the behest of the Senate leader, the Slovene Anton Korošec, that evening five ministers resigned from the government, including Korošec. The others were Spaho, another JMO politician Džafer Kulenović, the Slovene Franc Snoj, and the Serb Dragiša Cvetković.

Stojadinović sought authority from Prince Paul to form a new cabinet, but Korošec as head of the Senate advised the prince to form a new government under Cvetković. Prince Paul dismissed Stojadinović and appointed Cvetković in his place, with a direction that he reach an agreement with Maček. While these negotiations were ongoing, Italy invaded Albania, Yugoslavia's southern neighbour. In August 1939, the Cvetković–Maček Agreement was concluded to create the Banovina of Croatia, which was to be a relatively autonomous political unit within Yugoslavia. Separatist Croats considered the Agreement did not go far enough, and many Serbs believed it went too far in giving power to Croats. The Cvetković-led cabinet formed in the wake of the Agreement was resolutely anti-Axis, but remained on friendly terms with Germany, and included five members of the HSS, with Maček as deputy Prime Minister. General Milan Nedić was Minister of the Army and Navy. After the outbreak of World War II in September 1939, German pressure on the government resulted in the resignation in mid-1940 of the Minister of the Interior, Stanoje Mihaldžić, who had been organising covert anti-Axis activities. In October 1940, Simović was again approached by plotters planning a coup but he was non-committal. From the outbreak of war British diplomacy focused on keeping Yugoslavia neutral, which the Ambassador Ronald Ian Campbell apparently still believed possible.

=== Pressure builds ===
By the time of the German invasion of Poland and subsequent outbreak of war in September 1939, the Yugoslav Intelligence Service was cooperating with British intelligence agencies on a large scale across the country. This cooperation, which had existed to a lesser extent during the early 1930s, intensified after the Anschluss. These combined intelligence operations were aimed at strengthening Yugoslavia and keeping her neutral while encouraging covert activities. In mid to late 1940, British intelligence became aware of coup plotting, but managed to side-track the plans, preferring to continue working through Prince Paul. The Special Operations Executive (SOE) office in Belgrade went to significant lengths to support the opposition to the anti-Axis Cvetković government, which undermined the hard-won balance in Yugoslav politics that that government represented. SOE Belgrade was entangled with pro-Serb policies and interests, and disregarded or underestimated warnings from SOE and British diplomats in Zagreb, who better understood the situation in Yugoslavia as a whole.

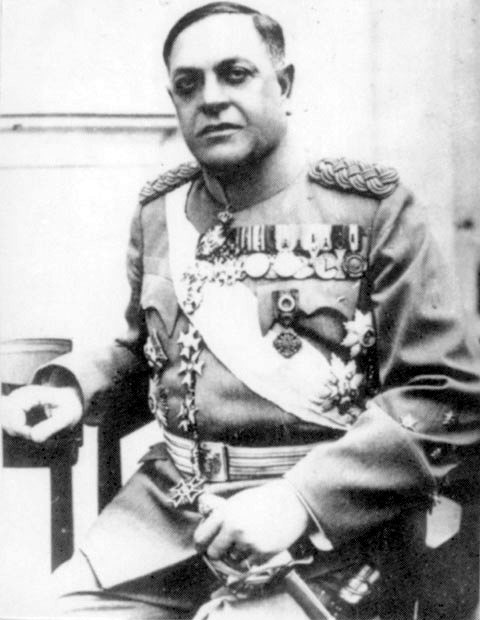
Minister of the Army and Navy Milan Nedić was fired by prince regent Paul in November 1940 for advocating that Yugoslavia join the Axis.

Yugoslavia's situation worsened in October 1940 when Italy invaded Greece from Albania, and the initial failure of the Italians to make headway only increased Yugoslav apprehension that Germany would be forced to help Italy. In September and November 1940 respectively, Germany forced Hungary and Romania to accede to the Tripartite Pact. In early November 1940, following the Italian invasion of Greece, Nedić stated in a memorandum to Prince Paul and the government that he believed that Yugoslavia was about to be fully encircled by enemy countries and that ultimately Germany would win the war. Nedić proposed to the government that it abandon its neutral stance and join the Axis as soon as possible in the thinking that joining the Axis would protect Yugoslavia against its "greedy neighbors". A few days later Prince Paul, having realised the impossibility of following Nedić's advice, replaced him with the ageing and compliant General Petar Pešić. At the same time, Adolf Hitler, recalling Serbia's excellent military performance in the Balkan Wars and World War I, was concerned that the Royal Yugoslav Army was strong, and defeating it would necessitate the expenditure of considerable effort. Despite this, he remained concerned about the threat to the southern flank of his planned invasion of the Soviet Union posed by Greece and Yugoslavia, and aimed for a political resolution of Yugoslavia's status.

On 12 December 1940, at the initiative of the Prime Minister of Hungary, Count Pál Teleki, Hungary concluded a friendship and non-aggression treaty with Yugoslavia. Although the concept had received support from both Germany and Italy, the actual signing of the treaty did not. Germany's planned invasion of Greece would be simplified if Yugoslavia could be neutralised. Over the next few months, Prince Paul and his ministers laboured under overwhelming diplomatic pressure, a threat of an attack by the Germans from Bulgarian territory, and the unwillingness of the British to promise practical military support. Six months prior to the coup, British policy towards the government of Yugoslavia had shifted from acceptance of Yugoslav neutrality to pressuring the country for support in the war against Germany.

On 23 January 1941, William J. Donovan, a special emissary of US President Franklin D. Roosevelt, visited Belgrade and issued an ultimatum, saying that if Yugoslavia permitted German troop passage then the US would not "interfere on her behalf" at peace talks. Around the same time, suspicious of Prince Paul's actions, the British Prime Minister, Winston Churchill, ordered British intelligence services to establish contacts with anti-regime groups in Belgrade. On 14 February, Hitler met with Cvetković and his foreign minister and requested Yugoslavia's accession to the Tripartite Pact. He pushed for the demobilisation of the Royal Yugoslav Army – there had been a partial "reactivation" (a euphemism for mobilisation) in south-eastern Yugoslavia (present day North Macedonia and southern Serbia) – probably directed at the Italians. Hitler also pressed the Yugoslavs to permit the transportation of German supplies through Yugoslavia's territory, along with greater economic cooperation. In exchange he offered a port near the Aegean Sea and territorial security. On 17 February, Bulgaria and Turkey signed an agreement of friendship and non-aggression, which effectively destroyed attempts to create a neutral Balkan bloc. Prince Paul denounced the agreement and the Bulgarians, describing their actions as "perfidy". On 18 and 23 February, Prince Paul told the US Ambassador Arthur Bliss Lane that Yugoslavia would not engage the German military if they entered Bulgaria. He explained that to do so would be wrongful and that it would not be understood by the Slovenes and Croats. On 1 March, Yugoslavia was further isolated when Bulgaria signed the Pact and the German Army arrived at the Bulgarian-Yugoslav border.

On 4 March, Prince Paul secretly met with Hitler in Berchtesgaden and was again pressured to sign the Pact. Hitler did not request troop passage through Yugoslavia and offered the Greek city of Salonika. A time limit for Prince Paul, who was uncommitted and "wavering", was not set. Prince Paul, in the middle of a cabinet crisis, offered a nonaggression pact and a declaration of friendship, but Hitler insisted on his proposals. Prince Paul warned that "I fear that if I follow your advice and sign the Tripartite Pact I shall no longer be here in six months." On 8 March, Franz Halder, the German Chief of the Army General Staff, expressed his expectation that the Yugoslavs would sign if German troops did not cross their border. During March, secret treaty negotiations commenced in Moscow between Yugoslavia and the Soviet Union, represented respectively by the Yugoslav ambassador, Milan Gavrilović, and the Soviet People's Commissar for Foreign Affairs, Vyacheslav Molotov. According to General Pavel Sudoplatov, who was at the time the deputy chief of special operations for the NKVD, the Soviet internal affairs ministry, Gavrilović was a fully recruited Soviet agent, although he also states that they knew that Gavrilović had ties with the British as well. The Yugoslavs initially sought a military alliance, but this was rejected by the Soviet side, as they were already bound by the 1939 Molotov–Ribbentrop Pact which guaranteed non-belligerence with Germany.

On 17 March, Prince Paul returned to Berchtesgaden and was told by Hitler that it was his last chance for Yugoslavia to join the Pact, renouncing this time the request for the use of Yugoslav railways in order to facilitate their accession. Two days later, Prince Paul convened a Crown Council to discuss the terms of the Pact and whether Yugoslavia should sign it. The council's members were willing to agree, but only under the condition that Germany let its concessions be made public. Germany agreed and the Council approved the terms. Three cabinet ministers resigned on 20 March in protest of the impending signing of the Pact. These were the Minister of the Interior, Srđan Budisavljević; the Minister of Agriculture, Branko Čubrilović; and the Minister without Portfolio, Mihailo Konstantinović. The British were friendly with Budisavljević, and his resignation at British urging precipitated the resignations of the other two. The Germans reacted by imposing an ultimatum to accept by midnight 23 March or forfeit any further chances. Prince Paul and Cvetković obliged and accepted, despite believing German promises were "worthless". On 23 March, Germany's guarantee of Yugoslavia's territorial security and its promise not to use its railroads were publicised. In the United Kingdom, Alexander Cadogan, the Permanent Under-Secretary of State for Foreign Affairs, penned in his diary that the "Yugoslavs seem to have sold their souls to the Devil. All these Balkan peoples are trash."

=== Yugoslavia signs the Tripartite Pact ===
On 25 March, the pact was signed at the Belvedere Palace in Vienna. An official banquet was held which Hitler complained felt like a funeral party. German radio later announced that "the Axis Powers would not demand the right of passage of troops or war materials," while the official document mentioned only troops and omitted mention of war materials. Likewise the pledge to give Salonika to Yugoslavia does not appear on the document. In Athens, Allied planners were dismayed by the Yugoslav signing of the Pact, as it represented a "worst case scenario" for the defence of Greece. On the following day, Serb demonstrators gathered on the streets of Belgrade shouting "Better the grave than a slave, better a war than the pact" (Serbo-Croatian Latin: Bolje grob nego rob, Bolje rat nego pakt).

== Development of the coup ==
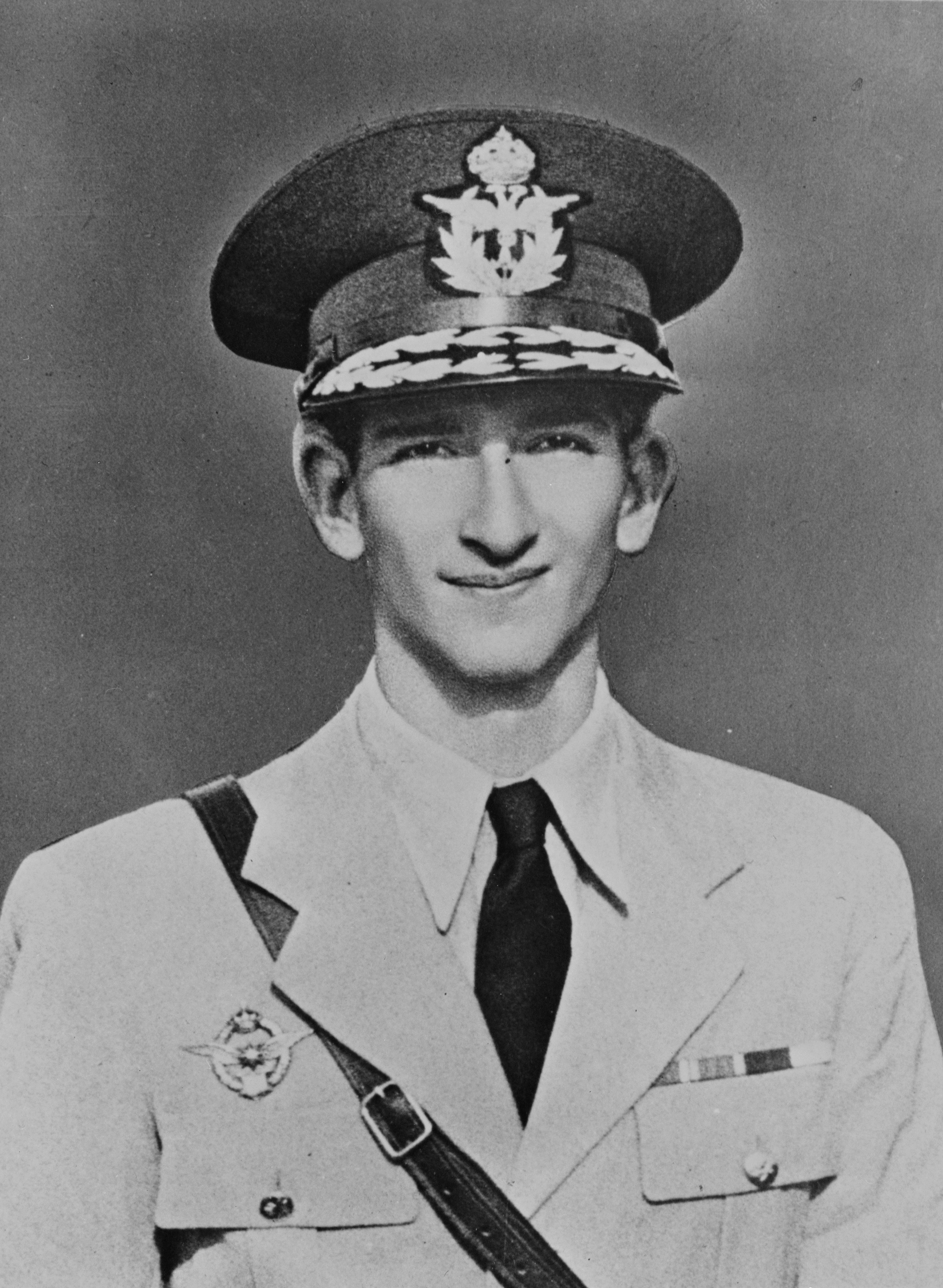
Peter II, 17 years old at the time of coup, was declared to be of age.

The coup was executed at 2:15 am on 27 March. It was planned by a group of VVKJ officers in Zemun, and Royal Guard officers in nearby Belgrade. The only senior officers involved were from the air force. Under the supervision of the VVKJ deputy commander Borivoje Mirković, headquartered at the VVKJ base at Zemun, officers assumed control of critical buildings and locations in the early hours of 27 March, including:

- the Zemun VVKJ base (Colonel Dragutin Savić)
- the bridges over the Sava between Zemun and Belgrade (Colonel Dragutin Dimić)
- the Belgrade Town Hall Building, Police Directorate and the Belgrade radio station (Colonel Stjepan Burazović)
- the ministries and headquarters of the General Staff (Major Živan Knežević)
- the Royal Court (Colonel Stojan Zdravković)
- the main post office in Belgrade (Lieutenant Colonel Miodrag Lozić)
- the barracks of the Royal Guards and Automotive Command

An inspector of post, telegraph and telephone assisted Mirković by cutting off communications between Belgrade and the rest of the country. Tanks and artillery were deployed on all the main streets of Belgrade, and by 2:00 pm all strategic locations were in the hands of troops loyal to the coup leaders.

At the time of the coup, Prince Paul was in Zagreb en route to a planned holiday in Brdo. On the morning of 27 March, Deputy Prime Minister Maček was informed of the coup and met Prince Paul at Zagreb Central Station to discuss the situation. A meeting was then held at the residence of the Ban of Croatia, Ivan Šubašić, which included Šubašić, Prince Paul, Maček and the army commander in Zagreb, August Marić. Maček urged Prince Paul to oppose the putsch and Marić pledged the support of the Croatian units of the army. Maček suggested that Prince Paul stay in Zagreb, with the possibility of mobilising army units in the Banovina of Croatia in his support. Prince Paul declined this offer, at least partially because his wife, Princess Olga, and children remained in Belgrade. Accompanied by Šubašić, he reached the capital by train that evening and was met by Simović, who took him to the war ministry where he and the other two regents relinquished power, immediately abolishing the regency. Having already made arrangements with the British consul in Zagreb, Prince Paul and his family left that evening for Greece, after which they travelled to Kenya, spending time at Oserian and then exile in South Africa.

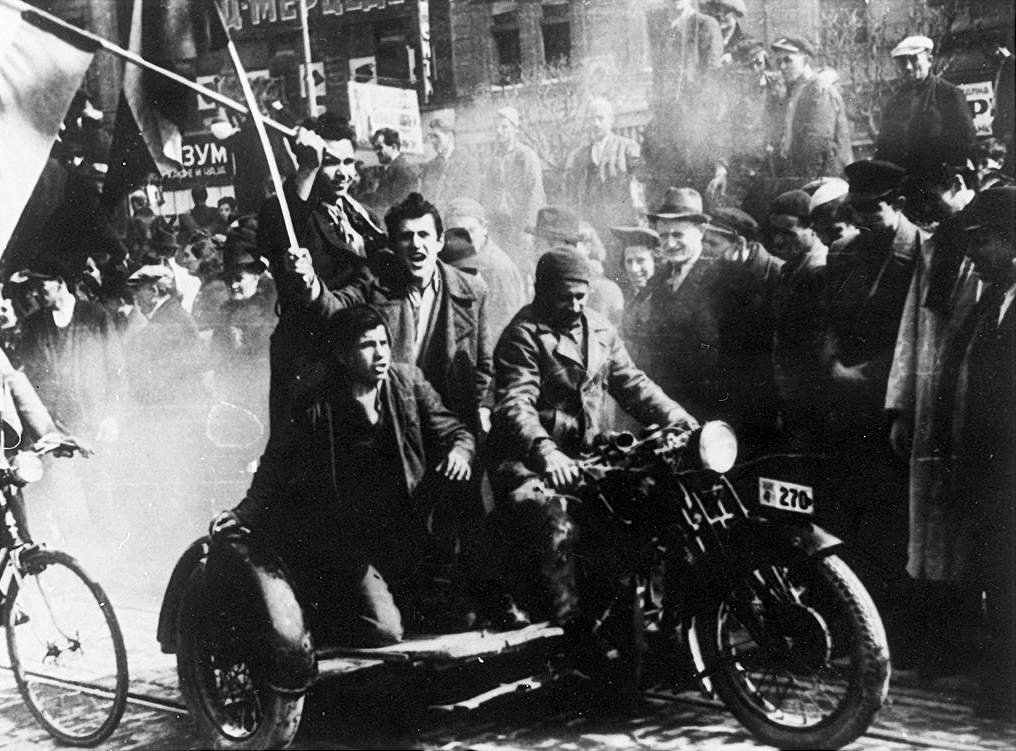
Demonstrations in Belgrade on 27 March

On the morning of 27 March, the royal palace was surrounded and the coup's advocates issued a radio message that impersonated the voice of King Peter with a "proclamation to the people", calling on them to support the King. Peter was surprised by the coup, and heard of his coming of age for the first time on the radio. Pamphlets with the proclamation of the coup were subsequently dropped onto cities from aircraft. Demonstrations followed in Belgrade and other large Yugoslav cities that continued for the next few days, including in Cetinje, Podgorica, Split, Skopje and Kragujevac. The crowds at these demonstrations shouted slogans in support of the United Kingdom, and also frequently used the slogan that had been used by demonstrators the day before the coup, "Better the war than the pact, better the grave than a slave". Members of the Communist Party of Yugoslavia, which had been outlawed since 1920, also took part in pro-putsch rallies all over the country. Winston Churchill declared that "Yugoslavia has found its soul," and he even considered that a Balkan front could be established with Turkish help. The news resulted in Greek attempts to change their defence plans, and the Greeks also pressed the Yugoslavs to attack the Italians in Albania. The Polish and Czechoslovak governments-in-exile both praised the coup, and news of it was received in Greece with "wild enthusiasm". According to the memoirs of the Serbian Orthodox Patriarch, Gavrilo V, the putsch was immediately welcomed by the senior clergy of the church, as the Holy Assembly of Bishops convened on 27 March in response to the coup. Patriarch Gavrilo also spoke publicly in support of the King and the new regime over the radio. King Peter II was inaugurated in the presence of Patriarch Gavrilo on 28 March. The coup was extremely popular in Belgrade, leading to vast crowds forming in the street chanting slogans including "Nema rata bez Srba" ("No war without the Serbs"). Many members of the crowd carried Yugoslav flags along with the British, French, and United States flags, as a sign of their Allied sympathies.

For other nations in Yugoslavia, the prospect of war and the new government's close ties to the Serbian Orthodox Church was not at all appealing. Archbishop Aloysius Stepinac, president of the Roman Catholic Episcopal Conference of Yugoslavia, bitterly wrote in his diary that, "All in all, Croats and Serbs are of two worlds... that will never move closer to one another without an act of God". He also wrote, "The Schism [Orthodoxy] is the greatest curse in Europe, almost greater than Protestantism. There is no morality, no principle, there is no truth, no justice, no honesty [in Orthodoxy]." On the same day, he publicly called on the Catholic clergy to pray for King Peter and that Croatia and Yugoslavia would be spared a war. The coup resulted in only one death, which was accidental. The Slovenes and especially the Croats disliked the coup, which was widely believed to make a German invasion inevitable.

== Responsibility for the coup ==
There are contradictory claims regarding who was the leader of the coup, coming from Simović, Mirković, and Živan Knežević. Mirković claimed sole credit immediately after the coup and stated on its tenth anniversary that: "Only after I had informed General [Simović] about my idea and he had accepted it did I make the decision to undertake the planned revolt. I made the decision myself, and I also carried out the whole organization. I made the decision as to when the revolt would take place." It is likely that he had been planning a coup since 1937 when an Italo-Yugoslav pact was signed. King Peter later credited simply the "younger and middle ranks [of officers] of the Yugoslav army" for the coup in a speech on 17 December 1941. In 1951, Mirković stated that he had been considering a putsch since 1938, and had discussed the idea quite openly with a significant number of generals, including Milan Nedić. He went on to say that he had offered the lead role in the post-coup government to a number of prominent people, including: Milan Nedić; the governor of the Morava Banovina, Janićije Krasojević; the commander of the Royal Guard, General Aleksandar Stanković; General Bogoljub Ilić; and Simović. Nedić and Krasojević refused as they felt they could not take an active part due to their positions, Stanković promised not to use the Royal Guard against the people and to keep his knowledge of the plot secret, Ilić did not think he had the political influence to perform the role, and Simović agreed.

Simović's response to Mirković's claims was published posthumously. Simović claimed that he "stood in the center of the whole undertaking" and "personally engaged his assistant Brigadier General Bora Mirković for the action". Tomasevich considers Mirković's account to be the more credible of the two, and points out it is corroborated from several sources, both Allied and Axis. The matter would play a role in the factionalism that would divide the soon-to-be Yugoslav government-in-exile during the war.

According to former British diplomat and Emeritus Professor of History, Classics, and Archaeology of the University of Edinburgh David A. T. Stafford, writing in 1977, although supported with British intelligence and encouragement, the "[i]nitiative came from the Yugoslavs, and only by a stretch of the imagination can the British be said to have planned or directed the coup d'etat." Radoje Knežević vehemently denied any British involvement at all in a series of published letters between himself and Stafford, until in 1979, Stafford apologised for his error and for any offence caused to Radoje Knežević. In 1999, the historian Ivo Tasovac criticised Stafford's revised conclusion, pointing to evidence that the plotters were dependent on British intelligence, and that senior British officials met with both Simović and Mirković immediately before the coup was carried out. The British air attaché Group Captain A. H. H. McDonald met with Simović on 26 March, and the assistant air attaché and British intelligence agent T. G. Mappleback met with his close friend Mirković on the same day and told him that the coup had to be carried out within the next 48 hours. According to the historian Marta Iaremko, writing in 2014, "the vast majority of researchers" consider that the putsch was planned with the assistance of the British intelligence services, but that this, and their encouragement of the revolt, were not sufficient to ensure it was carried out.

According to Sudoplatov, the coup was actively supported by Soviet military intelligence (GRU) and the NKVD, following the Soviet leader Joseph Stalin′s instructions, with a view to strengthening the USSR's strategic position in the Balkans. A group of Soviet intelligence officers that included Major General Solomon Milshtein and Vasily Zarubin was sent to Belgrade to assist in the coup. The activities of the USSR in Yugoslavia had been boosted by the establishment of a Soviet mission in Belgrade in 1940; the Soviet Union had been developing its intelligence network through left-wing journalists and academics at the University of Belgrade. The German embassy in Belgrade was certain that the coup had been organised by British and Soviet intelligence agencies.

Individuals that were probably aware of the coup included Slobodan Jovanović, president of the Serbian Cultural Club, and Ilija Trifunović-Birčanin, president of Serbian nationalist organisation Narodna Odbrana (National Defence). Some of those urging a coup or at least aware that a coup was planned had previously been involved with secretive Black Handers, including Božin Simić. Mirković himself had been a student of the leading Black Hand operative, Colonel Dragutin Dimitrijević (also known as "Apis"), while training at the Serbian Military Academy. Those that favoured the coup included the older generation of generals, including the former prime minister Petar Živković and his brother Dimitrije Živković, intellectuals, leftist students, the opposition, the army and army air force, and the Orthodox Church. The generals had various reasons for disliking Prince Paul, including being placed on the retired or reserve lists, postings to lesser roles to prevent them from engaging in politics, and aversion to Prince Paul's policies.

== Aftermath ==
=== The new government ===
In the wake of the coup, Simović's new government refused to ratify Yugoslavia's signing of the Tripartite Pact, but did not openly rule out doing so. Hitler, angered by the coup and anti-German incidents in Belgrade, gathered his senior officers and ordered that Yugoslavia be crushed without delay. In particular, Hitler was concerned about the British Royal Air Force using bases in Greece and Yugoslavia to conduct air attacks against the southern flank of the pending attack on the Soviet Union. On the same day as the coup he issued Führer Directive 25 which called for Yugoslavia to be treated as a hostile state. Italian forces were to be included in the operations and the directive made specific mention that "[e]fforts will be made to induce Hungary and Bulgaria to take part in operations by offering them the prospect of regaining Banat and Macedonia". Furthermore, the directive stated that "[i]nternal tensions in Yugoslavia will be encouraged by giving political assurances to the Croats", taking account of their dissatisfaction with their position in pre-war Yugoslavia. Later, Hitler stated that the coup had been a shock.

At the same time that he ordered the invasion of Yugoslavia, Hitler postponed the invasion of the Soviet Union, Operation Barbarossa, by about four weeks from its original date of 15 May. Up to this point, the need for some delay due to the particularly wet spring in eastern Europe may have been foreseen, but the timing indicates that the unexpected need to defeat Yugoslavia was an important factor in Hitler's decision.

On 30 March, Foreign Minister Momčilo Ninčić summoned the German ambassador, Viktor von Heeren, and handed him a statement which declared that the new government would accept all its international obligations, including accession to the Tripartite Pact, as long as the national interests of the country were protected. For his part, Heeren demanded an apology for the anti-German demonstrations, immediate ratification of the Tripartite Pact, and demobilisation of the Yugoslav armed forces. Heeren returned to his office to discover a message from Berlin instructing that contact with Yugoslav officials was to be avoided, and he was recalled to Berlin, departing the following day. No reply was given to Ninčić. On 2 April, orders were issued for the evacuation of the German embassy, which occurred the next day, and the German chargé d'affaires advised the diplomats of friendly countries to leave the country. Heeren tried to assure Hitler that the putsch was an internal matter between Yugoslav political elites, and that action against Yugoslavia was unnecessary, but he was ignored. On 31 March, after offering Croatia to Hungary and being rebuffed, the Germans had decided to give Croatia its independence.

German Foreign Minister Joachim von Ribbentrop and the Volksdeutsche Mittelstelle worked to "organise cries for help" from ethnic Germans, Croats, Macedonians, and Slovenes in Yugoslavia that could be published in the press to provide moral justification for a German invasion. The German media simultaneously launched a barrage of accusations against Yugoslavia, claiming that German nationals in Yugoslavia had been subjected to atrocities, similar to the propaganda issued prior to the invasions of Poland and Czechoslovakia. This media onslaught also attempted to exploit divisions between Serbs and Croats, by pledging that the latter would have a prominent role in the country in the future. After the coup ethnic relations concerning Germans in Yugoslavia were tense, but rarely resulted in outright violence. The Yugoslav government denied allegations of German ethnic repression. Thousands of German nationals left Yugoslavia on instructions from Berlin.

On 3 April, Führer Directive 26 was issued, detailing the plan of attack and command structure for the invasion. Hungary and Bulgaria were promised the Banat and Yugoslav Macedonia respectively and the Romanian army was asked not to take part, holding its position at the Romania-Yugoslav border. Internal conflict in Hungary over the invasion plans between the army and Teleki led to the Prime Minister's suicide that same evening. Also on 3 April, Edmund Veesenmayer, representing the Dienststelle Ribbentrop, arrived in Zagreb in preparation for a regime change. The pilot Vladimir Kren, a Croat and a captain in the VVKJ, also defected to the Germans on 3 April taking with him valuable information about the country's air defences.

Simović named Maček as Deputy Prime Minister once again in the new government, but Maček was reluctant and remained in Zagreb while he decided what to do. While he considered the coup had been an entirely Serb initiative aimed at both Prince Paul and the Cvetković–Maček Agreement, he decided that he needed to show HSS support for the new government and that joining it was necessary. He also demanded that four Croat politicians from the deposed cabinet be part of the new one, to which Simović agreed. On 4 April, Maček travelled to Belgrade and accepted the post on several conditions: that the new government respect the Cvetković–Maček Agreement and expand the autonomy of the Banovina Croatia in some respects; that the new government respect the country's accession to the Tripartite Pact; and that one Serb and one Croat temporarily assume the role of regents. That same day exiled Croat politician and Ustaše leader Ante Pavelić called for Croats to start an uprising against the government over his Radio Velebit program based in Italy.

On 5 April the new cabinet met for the first time. While the first two conditions set by Maček were met, the appointment of regents was impracticable given King Peter had been declared to be of age. Involving representatives from across the political spectrum, Simović's cabinet was "extremely disunited and weak". It quickly realised that it had to embrace a foreign policy that bore a strong resemblance to that of the preceding administration. Budisavljević and Čubrilović, along with the four HSS politicians, were reinstated to cabinet. It included members who fell into three groups; those who were strongly opposed to the Axis and prepared to face war with Germany, those who advocated peace with Germany, and those that were uncommitted. The groups were divided as follows:

War with Germany
Cabinet member	Party	Portfolio
Dušan Simović	Mil	Prime Minister; Chief of the General Staff
Bogoljub Ilić	Mil	Minister of the Army and Navy
Srđan Budisavljević	SDS	Minister of Interior
Sava Kosanović	SDS	Minister of Supply
Branko Čubrilović	ZS	Minister of Agriculture
Radoje Knežević	DS	Minister of the Royal Court

Peace with Germany
Cabinet member	Party	Portfolio
Vladko Maček	HSS	First Vice-Premier
Ivan Andres	HSS	Minister of Trade and Industry
Josip Torbar	HSS	Minister of Posts and Telegraphs
Juraj Šutej	HSS	Minister of Finance
Bariša Smoljan	HSS	Minister without Portfolio
Momčilo Ninčić	NRS	Minister of Foreign Affairs
Džafer Kulenović	JMO	Minister of Forests and Mines
Fran Kulovec	SLS	Minister of Construction
Miha Krek	SLS	Minister without Portfolio

Uncommitted
Cabinet member	Party	Portfolio
Slobodan Jovanović	Ind.	Second Vice-Premier
Milan Grol	DS	Minister of Social Welfare and Public Health
Boža Marković	DS	Minister of Justice
Miloš Trifunović	NRS	Minister of Education
Bogoljub Jevtić	JNS	Minister of Transportation
Jovo Bonjanin	JNS	Minister without Portfolio
Marko Daković	Ind.	Minister without Portfolio

=== Non-Aggression Pact with the USSR ===
On 5 April 1941, the post-coup government signed the Treaty of Friendship and Non-Aggression with the Soviet Union in Moscow, for which talks had been underway since March. The relevant final article of the treaty read as follows: ″In the event of aggression against one of the contracting parties on the part of a third power, the other contracting party undertakes to observe a policy of friendly relations towards that party″, which fell short of a commitment to provide military assistance. Stalin's intention by entering into the treaty was to signal to Hitler that the Soviet Union had interests in the Balkans, while not antagonising his erstwhile ally. For this reason, Soviet military intervention in Yugoslavia was never considered. According to Tomasevich, this was "an almost meaningless diplomatic move", which could have had no real impact on the situation in which Yugoslavia found herself.

=== Axis invasion ===
Even within the Royal Yugoslav Army, divisions between a Croat-Slovene pro-Axis faction and a Serb pro-Allied faction emerged. The Axis invasion of Yugoslavia began on 6 April. The bombing of Belgrade forced the government to seek shelter outside the city. From here, King Peter and Simović planned to leave for exile. Maček, refusing to leave the country, resigned on 7 April and designated Juraj Krnjević as his successor. Maček returned to Zagreb. Three other ministers also refused to leave Yugoslavia: Ivan Andres and Bariša Smoljan of the HSS and Kulenović of the JMO. The government met on Yugoslav soil for the last time on 13 April near Pale. From here they travelled to Nikšić where they were flown out of the country to Athens. The Soviet leadership accepted the invasion of Yugoslavia without any criticism.

Another result of the coup was that the work that had been done by British intelligence with the anti-Axis government of Cvetković and Maček was lost. By supporting the coup plotters, the SOE undermined the balance in Yugoslav politics that had been achieved by the Cvetković–Maček Agreement. Serb nationalists supported and welcomed the coup because it ended Croat autonomy under the Agreement and freed them to pursue a Greater Serbia agenda. The coup and its immediate aftermath also contributed to the paralysis within the Yugoslav government-in-exile during the rest of the war, due to ongoing disputes regarding the legitimacy of the Cvetković–Maček Agreement.

== Legacy and historical evaluation ==
Other than the dispute over who could take credit for staging the coup, the event itself and the dismal showing of the Yugoslav armed forces during the invasion were extensively analysed and discussed by participants, Yugoslav and foreign scholars, and others, both during and after the war. It remained a source of pride for the most outspoken Serb nationalists and politicians from the Serb ruling groups that supported it. Those that had advanced a policy of accommodation with the Axis maintained that had the coup not occurred, Yugoslavia would have been able to remain neutral and would have therefore escaped invasion and the many other consequences, including the large number of deaths and widespread destruction during the war, and the victory of the communist-led Yugoslav Partisans and the creation of the Socialist Federal Republic of Yugoslavia. The proponents of accommodation also considered that Yugoslavia might have been able to enter the war on the Allied side at a later time and with less sacrifice. The KPJ saw the coup and invasion as a trigger for the wider revolt which resulted in its ultimate victory, and this aspect was commemorated each year in post-war Yugoslavia. In the final analysis, the primary significance of the coup was that it placed Yugoslavia's accession to the Tripartite Pact into doubt, which led directly to the Axis invasion. Tomasevich concurs with the KPJ evaluation that the coup and the resulting invasion were the starting point for the successful communist-led revolution.

According to the British major general and historian I. S. O. Playfair, the coup was essentially a brave gesture of defiance, mainly by Serbs, against the German domination signified by signing of the Tripartite Pact, undertaken in the full knowledge that invasion would likely follow. It was also, according to the historian Alexander Prusin, an "utter blunder, based on wishful thinking and emotions rather than a realistic appreciation of the country's limited economic and military potential". By overthrowing Prince Paul and the Cvetković government who had sought accommodation with the Croats, the coup also operationalised Serb opposition to the Cvetković-Maček Agreement. Further, it underlined the lack of unity between Serbs and Croats, which limited the military options available to the Yugoslav government.

Hitler's decision to invade Yugoslavia delayed the concurrent invasion of Greece by five days, but this was more than made up for by the advantages of being able to invade Greece via southern Yugoslavia, allowing the outflanking of the Aliakmon Line. The role of the coup and subsequent invasion of Yugoslavia in delaying Operation Barbarossa, and the subsequent Axis defeat by the Soviet Union, is disputed. In 1975, Tomasevich wrote that the events in Yugoslavia were "a partial cause of what proved to be a fateful delay in Hitler's invasion of the Soviet Union", and went on to state that many writers consider that this delay was responsible for the German failure to capture Moscow in the winter of 1941–1942. He acknowledged that, apart from the coup and invasion, the wet spring of 1941 contributed a two or three week delay to the launching of Barbarossa, but saw the delay caused by events in Yugoslavia as an important indirect factor in eventual Axis defeat in the war. In 1972 the historian Martin van Creveld examined the arguments supporting this position and dismissed such views as based on "sloppy scholarship" and "wishful thinking". He concluded that the invasion of Yugoslavia facilitated and accelerated the overall Balkan campaign, and that the fact that the Germans did not capitalise on the earlier than expected end of operations in Yugoslavia by bringing forward the start date for Operation Barbarossa proves beyond doubt that other factors determined the start date. In 2013, the Australian historians Craig Stockings and Eleanor Hancock, using new archival findings for their analysis of the invasion of Greece came to the conclusion that there is “little doubt” that to some degree the invasion of Yugoslavia forced a delay to the planned start date of the invasion of the Soviet Union.

Sue Onslow, in a bid to place the coup in the broader context of the British policy towards Yugoslavia between the outbreak of the Second World War and the events on 27 March 1941, writes that the coup was a major propaganda victory for Britain, as it "proved a tremendous, if ephemeral, boost to British morale, coming rapidly upon the victories against Italian forces in North Africa and the Sudan"; it also was "a much-needed fillip to the 'upstart'... Special Operations Executive created by [Hugh] Dalton".

Prince Paul was found guilty of war crimes in September 1945 for his role in the Yugoslav accession to the Tripartite Pact. In 2011, a High Court in Serbia found the sentence to be politically and ideologically motivated and Prince Paul was officially rehabilitated. A similar decision had been made in 2009 to rehabilitate Cvetković for war crimes charges relating to the signing of the pact.
