= List of Yugoslav regents =

This is a list of Yugoslav regents. A regent, from the Latin regens "one who reigns", is a person selected to act as head of state (ruling or not) because the ruler is a minor, not present, or debilitated.

== Regent for King Peter I ==
Image	Name	Regency start	Regency end
Regent during the reign of retired King Peter I.
	Crown Prince Alexander (1888–1934)	1 December 1918	16 August 1921; Death of King Peter I.

== Regent for King Peter II ==
Image	Name	Regency start	Regency end
Regent during the minority of King Peter II.
	Prime Minister Nikola Uzunović (1873–1954)	9 October 1934	11 October 1934; Regency Council took over.
Regency Council during the minority of King Peter II.
	Prince Paul (1893–1976)	11 October 1934	27 March 1941; Deposed.
	Radenko Stanković (1880–1956)	11 October 1934	27 March 1941; Deposed.
	Ivo Perović (1881–1958)	11 October 1934	27 March 1941; Deposed.
Regency Council appointed by King Peter II in exile.
	Srđan Budisavljević (1884–1968)	7 March 1945	29 November 1945; King deposed.
	Ante Mandić (1881–1959)	7 March 1945	29 November 1945; King deposed.
	Dušan Sernec (1882–1952)	7 March 1945	29 November 1945; King deposed.
