= Dušan Simović =

1941 Prime Minister of Yugoslavia (1882–1962)

- Душан Симовић
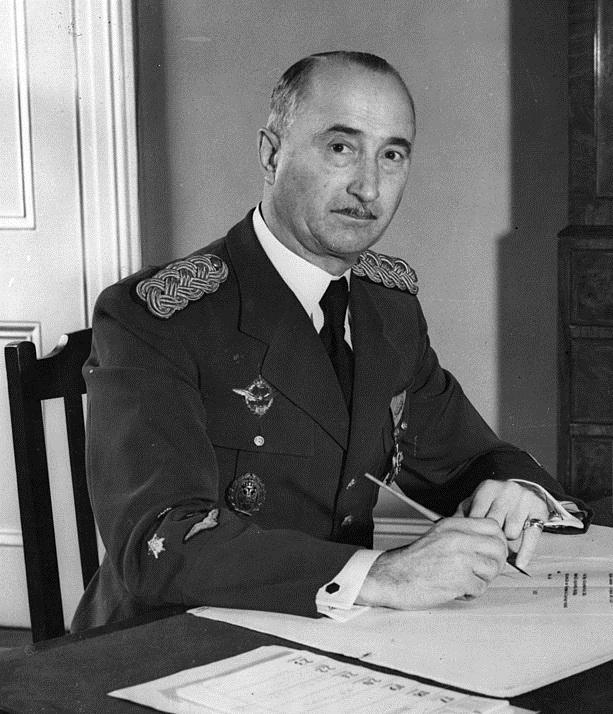

14th Prime Minister of Yugoslavia
- In office 27 March 1941 – 14 April 1941
- Monarch: Peter II
- Preceded by: Dragiša Cvetković
- Succeeded by: Himself as Prime Minister of government in exile
- In exile 15 April 1941 – 11 January 1942
- Succeeded by: Slobodan Jovanović

Personal details
- Born: 28 October 1882 Kragujevac, Kingdom of Serbia
- Died: 26 August 1962 (aged 79) Belgrade, PR Serbia, FPR Yugoslavia
- Citizenship: Yugoslav
- Spouse: Snežana Tadić
- Children: 2
- Occupation: Soldier, politician

Military service
- Allegiance: Kingdom of Serbia; Kingdom of Yugoslavia
- Branch/service: Royal Serbian Army; Royal Yugoslav Army
- Years of service: 1900–1943
- Rank: Army general
- Commands: Royal Yugoslav Air Force; Chief of the General Staff
- Battles/wars: First Balkan War; Second Balkan War; World War I World War II

Dušan Simović (Serbian Cyrillic: Душан Симовић; 28 October 1882 – 26 August 1962) was a Yugoslav Serb army general who served as Chief of the General Staff of the Royal Yugoslav Army and as the Prime Minister of Yugoslavia in 1941.

== Officer ==
Simović, born on 28 October 1882 in Kragujevac, attended elementary school and two years of high school in his hometown. Due to his interest in military matters, he left high school and entered the Military Academy in Belgrade. He completed the Military Academy course in 1900, when he was promoted to second lieutenant of artillery. He completed the Higher School of the Military Academy in 1905. He married Snežana Tadić (1883–1971), a Serbian-Ukrainian-Croatian pharmacist from Valjevo, and daughter of Milorad Tadić (1861–1940), in October 1908. They had three sons and four daughters.

During the Balkan Wars (1912–13) and during the First World War (1914–1918), he proved an excellent officer. He won promotion in 1913, and again, in 1915, to lieutenant colonel. At the Salonika front, he commanded the 7th Infantry Regiment. But even while working on the Salonika front as an infantry commander, Simović was interested in air power and in air defense. Every day he became more and more interested in the works of flight pioneer Mihailo Petrović (1884–1913), reading Petrović's reports on the Balkan Wars, as well as his studies on aviation. So Simović decided to dedicate his career to aviation. In 1918, he was named to the delegates of the Serbian government and the Joint Chiefs of Staff at the National Council of Slovenes, Croats and Serbs in Zagreb. Upon the break-up of the Austrian empire in October–November 1918, it remained unclear whether the Slovenes and the Croats would join in a union with Serbia to create a new country to be called Yugoslavia ("the land of the South Slavs"). The Croat Sabor had issued a declaration of independence on 29 October 1918. The deciding issue was that the Bolsheviks had in December 1917 published the secret Treaty of London signed in May 1915 under which Britain, France, and Russia had promised Italy the Istria and Dalmatia provinces of the Austrian empire in exchange for declaring war on Austria. In the Austrian empire's absence, the majority of the Slovenes and Croats favored the Yugoslav concept as the best way to hold onto Istria and Dalmatia. On 14 November 1918, Simović reported to his superiors that an overwhelming majority of the people in Zagreb were "taken with the idea of Yugoslav solidarity". With Italy trying to take advantage of the dissolution of the Austrian empire by seizing the provinces promised by the Treaty of London, Simović advised his superiors to tell the National Council, which represented an ad hoc government for Croatia and Slovenia, that there was no time to waste and the council should proclaim a union with Serbia as soon as possible. Simović blocked an Italian attempt to occupy Ljubljana by having the Serb Army occupy Ljubljana first. Up to the onset of World War II he devoted himself exclusively to aviation.

From May 1938 until 1940 he served as Chief of the General Staff, in which position he replaced General Milutin Nedić. There were two war plans for the defense of Yugoslavia drawn by the General Staff. The first one, which was drawn up by Simović called for the defense of all Yugoslavia. The second plan, called for the Royal Yugoslav Army to concentrate on defending Serbia and Montenegro and then to stage a fighting retreat into Bosnia-Herzegovina. Virtually all military experts questioned Simović's plans under the grounds that it would overextend the Yugoslav Army and Simović conceded that his plan was adopted for political rather than military reasons, namely to prove that the government in Belgrade cared about all the peoples of Yugoslavia. Raymond Brugère, the French minister-plenipotentiary in Belgrade, had long been worried about the pro-Axis tendencies of the Yugoslav prime minister Milan Stojadinović. Brugère who first met Simović in May 1938 reported to Paris that he was opposed to the foreign policy of Stojadinović and favored Yugoslavia standing the alliance it had signed with France in 1927.

In March 1941, he met Colonel William J. Donovan in Belgrade who was on a tour of the Balkans and the Middle East as the special emissary for President Franklin D. Roosevelt. Donovan informed Roosevelt that Simović believed that Germany would invade the Soviet Union in the near-future "...for the purpose of seizing Ukraine initially and eventually overpower south-east Europe". During the meeting, Donovan assured Simović that as a close friend of Roosevelt's, that the president's policy was to strongly support any state determined to resist Nazi Germany as Roosevelt felt it was imperative that Germany lose the war. At the same time, Simović was in contact with agents of the Special Operations Executive, created in 1940 to support resistance movements in Europe. The American historian Joseph Jakub noted that since the war a vast legend has been created which claims that the coup d'état of 27 March 1941 was the work of Anglo-American intelligence with Simović reduced to a puppet of his presumed Anglo-American masters.

== Prime Minister ==
He joined other officers in the March 1941 coup against the government of Dragiša Cvetković. After the coup, Simović became the new prime minister (27 March 1941). Simović did not repudiate the Tripartite Pact and assured the German minister-plenipotentiary, Viktor von Heeren, that his government was still committed to the Tripartite Pact as part of a desperate attempt to prevent a German invasion. Simović told Arthur Bliss Lane, the American minister-plenipotentiary, that he was anti-Axis, but that Yugoslavia was too weak to go to war against Germany and that an overt anti-German foreign policy would shatter Yugoslav national unity as most Croats favored a pro-German foreign policy. He appointed as his foreign minister Momčilo Ninčić, formerly the president of the Yugoslav-German friendship society, in attempt to gain favor with Adolf Hitler. Simović had overthrown the Regent, Prince Paul of Yugoslavia, and Cvetković, for having signed the Tripartite Pact, but as prime minister he continued the same foreign policy as Prince Paul and Cvetković as the only hope of preventing a German invasion. Huge crowds had come out in Belgrade to denounce Yugoslavia signing the Tripartite Pact and to cheer the coup, which gave the impression that the coup was aimed at undoing Yugoslavia's accession to the Tripartite Pact. The impression was further reinforced by a speech by the British Prime Minister Winston Churchill, which portrayed the coup as anti-Axis. There was much popular anger in Belgrade over the brutally bullying tactics of Hitler and his Foreign Minister Joachim von Ribbentrop, which made Yugoslavia's accession appeared as an abject national humiliation, hence the outburst of widespread joy at the news of the coup. The American historian Joseph Rothschild wrote the co-leader of the coup, General Borivoje Mirković was "too politically naïve" to understand the dangers of a German invasion, but that the "more sophisticated" Simović was not. The Serb historian Sima M. Cirković wrote it was a "legend" that Simović repudiated the Tripartite Pact, knowing full well that it would trigger a German invasion, instead noting Simović essentially chose to continue Paul's foreign policy, writing at most his government leaned in an anti-Axis and pro-Allied neutrality. The British historian Tim Judah wrote that the oddest aspect of the coup was that having been undertaken against the Prince Regent for having signed the Tripartite Pact, Simović in power did not repudiate the Tripartite Pact and instead continued with it. The principle reasons for this volte-face was that Simović had discovered, just as Prince Paul had before, that Churchill spoke very loudly of his wish to have Yugoslavia oppose Germany, but that words were all that the British were willing to offer. Simović swiftly learned that there would be no British military support and that Yugoslavia would be on its own if faced with a German invasion. Simović had been misinformed by a British journalist who had told him the entirely spurious story that Britain had just landed 15 divisions in Greece and was preparing to march north to link up with the Yugoslavs. On 27 March 1941, Hitler, furious about the coup, ordered an invasion of Yugoslavia under the grim codename of Operation Punishment.

A major historical debate concerns the allegation that Simović was put up to the coup by SOE. In the official history of British intelligence operations in World War Two, Harry Hinsley wrote that Simović was in contact with Sir Ronald Hugh Campbell, the British minister-plenipotentiary in Belgrade, together with the British service attachés along with SOE agents who all seemed to have misled him about the amount of British support he could expect. However, Hinsley concluded: "While British participation in the coup plans no doubt contributed to their success, it is clear that even without direct British encouragement there still would have been a coup". Bickham Sweet-Escott, an SOE agent stationed in Belgrade, wrote afterwards "most of us thought the coup would have happened even if SOE hadn't existed at all". Donovan, who later became the chief of the Office of Strategic Services (OSS), upon reading an OSS document claiming that he had masterminded the coup during his meeting with Simović in 1941 wrote on the margin "NO".

As prime minister, Simović adopted the plan he had drawn up for the defense of all Yugoslavia, despite warnings that he was spreading his forces too thinly. Likewise, Simović refused to order a general mobilization of the Yugoslav military, out of the fear of offending Hitler. In 1914, when Russia mobilized, Germany had declared war on Russia supposedly in response to the Russian mobilization, and from 1939 to 1941 Poland, Belgium, Yugoslavia, and the Soviet Union all tried to avoid repeating the supposed Russian mistake of 1914 by not mobilizing, which made the work of the Wehrmacht much easier. The American historian Robert M. Citino has noted that the Royal Yugoslav Army consisted of seventeen active divisions and twelve reserve divisions, and that when fully mobilized it could bring 10,000,000 men to the field. Citino wrote that Simović made two crucial errors in refusing to mobilize and in spreading his forces out by trying to defend all of Yugoslavia's 1,900 miles of frontier at once. However, he defended Simović's decision to defend all of Yugoslavia by writing that it would have been politically impossible for him to abandon most of Yugoslavia without a fight, and that the other peoples of Yugoslavia, such as the Slovenes, the Croats, and so on would not understand why the government was focused on only defending Serbia. Simović's decision to defend all of Yugoslavia forced the Royal Yugoslav Army to spread itself out in long columns across the countryside as the troops deployed to the frontiers, a deployment that was still being carried out on 6 April. The lack of air cover left the columns highly vulnerable to attacks by the Luftwaffe. By 6 April, only seven divisions were in place by the frontiers with the rest all marching to their positions. Germany usually invaded its neighbors in Eastern Europe under the pretext that the local volksdeutsche (ethnic German) minorities were being oppressed and in an attempt to avoid war, Simović met with Sepp Janko, the Nazi leader of the half-million strong Yugoslav volksdeutsche community, on 31 March 1941. Simović told Janko that he appreciated the role of the volksdeutsche in Yugoslav life and his government would not discriminate against the volksdeutsche in any way. Alarmingly for Simović, the German newspapers started to print stories alleging that Yugoslavia was oppressing its volksdeutsche minority. The stories in the German newspapers resembled the stories published about Czechoslovakia's treatment of its volksdeutsche minority in the Sudenteland crisis and Poland's treatment of its volksdeutsche in the Danzig crisis with the common theme being that the Slavic peoples were oppressing the volksdeustche due to jealousy of the "racially superior" Germans. Along the same lines, the German newspapers also printed stories alleging that the Serbs were not only oppressing the volksdeutsche of the Banat, but also the Magyar, Croat, Italian and Macedonian populations of Yugoslavia.

Simović supported the Sporazum of 1939, which had granted Croatia much autonomy within the kingdom, making for a semi-federation as the price for better Serb-Croat relations. He invited Vladko Maček, the leader of the Croat Peasant Party, to serve as his vice prime minister, an offer Maček accepted after some hesitation. Simović's viewpoint was Yugoslav rather than Serb, and he sincerely wanted Serbs and Croats to collaborate to improve Yugoslavia. Most of the Yugoslav parties were represented in Simović's cabinet, which included members of the Serb Democratic Party, the Croat Peasant Party, the Serb Radical Party, the Yugoslav National Party, the Slovene People's Party, the Serb Agrarian Party, and the Yugoslav Muslim Organization. The only parties excluded from Simović's cabinet were the Yugoslav Radical Alliance, the fascist parties, and the illegal Yugoslav Communist Party. The other co-leader of the coup, General Borivoje Mirković, had wanted a military government, but Simović saw himself as leading a "government of national salvation" that would be made up of "distinguished personalities" representing every ethnic group, region and religion in Yugoslavia. Radoje Knežević who, along with his brother Živan Knežević, had played a major role in the coup had insisted successfully that the cabinet should include as many leaders of the various political parties as possible to provide legitimacy. The decision to include as many politicians as possible left the cabinet a heterogenous group with some ministers supporting signing the Tripartite Pact while others were opposed. Likewise, some ministers supported the Sporazum while others were opposed. Many of the officers who had participated in the coup were anti-Sporazum, and Maček initially believed that Simović intended to undo the Sporazum. Maček made the decision to join the cabinet out of the belief that he could better defend the Sporazum inside the Simović cabinet rather being out of it. The Serbian historian Stevan K. Pavlowitch wrote: "Simović appears to have been a patriotic general but a politically incompetent prime minister. He wanted to play a great role and did not, in spite of appearances, really trust politicians."

An offer was made by Winston Churchill to send the British Foreign Secretary Anthony Eden and the chief of the Imperial General Staff, General John Dill, to Belgrade to discuss plans for Yugoslavia to co-ordinate its defense with Greece and the Force W that had been sent to Greece. Simović first accepted the offer, and then said he did not want Eden in Belgrade as it would attract too much attention. Dill, wearing civilian clothing, visited Belgrade on 1–2 April 1941 to meet Simović. On 4 April 1941, Dill reported that his meetings with Simović were "disappointing" as "was impossible to get Simović to sign an agreement". Simović complained that the British were only willing to offer moral support as Dill was forced to tell him that there was no possibility of British military or economic support for Yugoslavia. The British had sent Force W under the command of Henry Maitland Wilson to Greece that consisted of the 6th Australian Division, the 2nd New Zealand Division and the 1st British Armored Brigade, but Dill told Simović that Force W was only for the defense of Greece and there was no possibility of sending Force W north to Yugoslavia. Dill tried to soften the blow by telling Simović that Force W along with the Royal Hellenic Army would try to defend Thessaloniki, Greece's second largest city and the principle port by which Yugoslav goods were exported, as long as possible, but had to concede that the Anglo-Greek forces would not attempt to link up with the Yugoslav forces. Simović complained that the Yugoslav Army had too few anti-tank and anti-aircraft guns and that the Yugoslav border defenses were unfinished. German forces had been massing in Bulgaria since February 1941 and Simović noted that the border defenses along the Struma and Strumica valleys—the most likely invasion routes from Bulgaria—were in an especially sorry state. Dill arranged to send General Adrian Carton de Wiart to Belgrade to liaison with Simović. The plane that was taking Carton de Wiart from Malta to Egypt crashed into the sea off the coast of the Italian colony of Libya. Dill concluded in a report he sent to Churchill: "Nevertheless, I was impressed with the offensive spirt of the Yugo-Slav leaders who will fight if Germany attacks Yugo-Slavia or if Germany attacks Salonica", but that "Yugo-Slav forces are not ready for war and Simović wants to gain time" by delaying mobilization. On 3 April 1941, most of the staff of the German legation in Belgrade suddenly left for Germany on the same train, which worried Simović as it suggested that the Luftwaffe would soon bomb Belgrade. Simović did agree to a meeting at the border town of Kenali on 3 April to be attended by General Janković, the director of planning for the Yugoslav Army; General Alexandros Papagos, the commander-in-chief of the Greek Army and Wilson. At the meeting, Janković asked that Wilson provide five British Army divisions to defend Yugoslavia, saying that Dill had promised Simović five divisions at the meeting in Belgrade. Wilson was forced to tell Janković that the only divisions he had were the 6th Australian and 2nd New Zealand Division.

Simović had little time to make his mark on Yugoslav politics: on the wedding day of his daughter, 6 April 1941, Nazi Germany invaded Yugoslavia. Operation Punishment, the invasion of Yugoslavia, began with a "decapitation strike" with the Luftwaffe bombing Belgrade three times over the course of the night of 6 April. Most people in Belgrade lived in makeshift, wooden houses and the incendiary bombs used by the Luftwaffe set off raging fires that consumed much of the city. Besides for destroying much of Belgrade and killing thousands of civilians, the air raids on Belgrade crippled the ability of the government to exercise command and control over the Royal Yugoslav Army. When the invasion started, Germany was fully mobilized and Yugoslavia was not mobilized, which gave a significant advantage to the Wehrmacht. Simović's frontier defense strategy caused the Yugoslav forces to be deployed in a manner that provided no depth to the defense. The Yugoslav divisions were extended in long lines along the frontiers or were headed towards the frontier. The British historian John Keegan criticized Simović's strategy by quoting the aphorism of Frederick the Great: "He who tries to defend everything defends nothing". Keegan argued that Simović should have concentrated his forces in depth in the mountains in Serbia, which might have at least delayed the Germans. The lack of reserves caused by the frontier defense strategy ensured that once the Wehrmacht had broken through the frontier lines there were no forces to stop them. Throughout the rest of the invasion, Simović had no control of the commanders of the armies, corps and divisions because they could not communicate with Belgrade. The long columns of Yugoslav troops spread out in the countryside without air cover were relentlessly bombed by the Luftwaffe. Simović was reduced to sending out an order on 11 April 1941 to his armies to "fight the enemy wherever you may be in contract with him in all directions on your own initiative without awaiting any orders from higher command echelons". On 11 April 1941, he attended his last cabinet meeting on Yugoslav soil in Pale in Bosnia-Herzegovina. On 12 April Belgrade was taken by the Wehrmacht. Simović fled Yugoslavia with his family on 15 April 1941 for Greece, and from there went to Jerusalem in the Palestine Mandate. Yugoslavia surrendered on 18 April 1941.

== Government-in-exile ==
On 4 May 1941, Simović issued a statement in Jerusalem saying that the Sporazum was "one of the cornerstones of state policy", a statement endorsed by only two of the Serb parties. On 21 June 1941, along with King Peter II Simović arrived in London. When the Yugoslav government-in-exile arrived in London, the journalists of Fleet Street gave the arrival much coverage as the British journalists were taken with the romantic picture of a teenage king in exile being guided by a patriotic general who sacrificed his nation rather than submit to being dominated by Nazi Germany. King Peter II came to dislike the "tutoring" offered him by Simović, who he found too overbearing and patronizing.

On 27 June 1941, Simović and Ninčić met with Eden to assure him that the Yugoslav government-in-exile would follow the British line in foreign policy. During the meeting, Simović and Ninčić told Eden of their wish to not only restore Yugoslavia under the House of Karađorđević after the war and of their wish to create a federation with Greece and Bulgaria, albeit in the case of the latter with the proviso that the current pro-German government in Sofia would have to be overthrown first. Of Simović's cabinet of 22 men, two were killed in the bombing of Belgrade while five chose not go into exile. On Serbian National Day on 28 June 1941, Simović gave a speech on the BBC's Serbo-Croatian language station, where he declared: "This German action might have had serious military consequences. However, the attack against Turkey, the Middle East and Russia was postponed by the events following upon March 27th, when Yugoslavia became her chief enemy...Yugoslavia frustrated the plans of the German General Staff, forced it to lose time, and thereby saved Allied Turkey and the Near East, and made impossible the envelopment of Russia from the south and the attack on it from the rear over the Caucasus to the east of the Caspian Sea and forced Hitler to limit himself to a frontal attack". In the same speech, Simović called for post-war Yugoslavia to be expanded at the expense of Italy as he promised his listeners that all of the lands and cities claimed by Yugoslavia at the Paris peace conference of 1919, namely Istria, Trieste, Gorizia and Zadar would be annexed after the war. Pierson Dixon, the chief of the Foreign Office's Southern Department which handled relations with the Balkans, wrote that Simović was making "fanciful" claims as he presented Yugoslavia's defeat as a sort of Allied victory, but his speech was "good propaganda". In August 1941, General Milan Nedić of the collaboratist "Government of National Salvation" in Belgrade gave a rebuttal speech where he mocking called Simović "the savior of Bolshevism" for his claim that the Yugoslav coup had delayed Operation Barbarossa for five weeks. In the meantime, Count Carlo Sforza, an anti-Fascist exile living in the United States, approached Lord Halifax, the British ambassador in Washington, about Simović's speech, saying he did not want Italy to lose any territory to Yugoslavia after the war. Halifax wrote Sforza a letter saying that Simović was expressing his personal views and the British government did not support Yugoslavia's claims against Italy. Simović expressed much anger to Eden when Halifax's letter became public knowledge and received the promise that Britain would be "sympathetic" towards Yugoslavia's claims against Italy after the war. He argued that Yugoslav national unity depended upon having British support for annexing the lands disputed with Italy as there were substantial Croat and Slovene populations in the disputed lands, and that it was important to show to the Slovenes and the Croats that Yugoslavia represented all of the South Slavic peoples. The British historian J.R. Whittam described Simović as an "embarrassing" ally by demanding that the Adriatic Question be settled in favor of Yugoslavia as it was politically difficult for Churchill and Eden to side with Italy against Yugoslavia in 1941. However, Churchill's policy towards Italy was to sever King Victor Emmanuel III from Benito Mussolini by pushing Italy into such a catastrophic situation that to save his throne the king would dismiss Mussolini in favor of another Italian leader who sign an armistice with the Allies. Hence, Churchill's tendency to champion the Italian side in the Adriatic question as a way to induce the Italian elite to turn against Mussolini.

Simović soon discovered in common with the leaders of the governments-in-exile that the British were most interested in those government-in-exile that could bring assets to the Allied cause. Nearly all of the Yugoslav forces had been captured, killed or deserted in the April campaign with a minority heading for the mountains and forests to continue the fight via guerilla warfare. Simović attempted to recruit an army out of the numerous Yugoslav immigrant communities in the United States and Canada. However, American neutrality laws blocked his recruiting efforts in the United States while the Canadian authorities preferred that Yugoslav immigrants serve in the Canadian forces. The force that the government-in-exile recruited were from the Slovene POWs serving in the Regio Esercito as the forced Italianization campaign against the Slovene minority made the Italo-Slovene community ardently Yugoslav and it was quickly discovered that Italo-Slovene POWs were quite willing to fight against the Axis. However, only one battalion was recruited from the Slovene POWs by early 1942. In terms of forces available, Yugoslavia was one of the weakest of the governments-in-exile and thus not considered important by the British.

In the summer of 1941, rumors started to reach London that some units of the Royal Yugoslav Army led by Colonel Draža Mihailović had in April 1941 escaped into the forests and mountains to start a guerrilla war and that Mihailović's forces called themselves the Chetniks after guerrilla fighters against the Ottoman Empire. According to Simović's memoirs, an American diplomat, Karl Rankin, who had been stationed in American Legation in Belgrade, had contacted the Yugoslav Legation in Lisbon in early August 1941 about "the establishment of a rebel core on Ravna Gora" whose leader was identified as "D.M.". The letter to Simović was signed "Z.P.T", but he wrote that he recognized the handwriting at once as that of Major Źarko Todorović, whom he know before the war. Simović seized upon the existence of the Chetniks to argue that Yugoslavia was contributing to the Allied war effort by tying down German and Italian divisions that would otherwise be available for operations elsewhere. He also saw the Chetniks as a threat to his power as reports stated that the Chetniks were led by younger officers who blamed Simović for the defeat in April, and hence his determination to have Mihailović declare his loyalty to the government-in-exile as a way to prevent a potential rival from asserting himself. Simović first heard reports of the Chetniks in August 1941, but it was not until October 1941 that his government-in-exile established firm contact with Mihailović. Simović's relations with SOE were tense as SOE favored sending two officers, Dušan Radović and Jovan Đonović, into Yugoslavia to make contact with the Chetniks without at first informing him. On 9 September 1941, Simović refused a request from SOE for more men for missions inside Yugoslavia under the grounds that the SOE never told him anything about what they were doing. On 12 September 1941, having finally been informed that the purpose of the mission was to make contact with the Chetniks, Simović provided two Yugoslav Air Force officers from Montenegro, Major Mirko Lalatović and Sergeant Veljko Dragićević, take part in Operation Bullseye. On 15 September, Simović vetoed the involvement of Radović in Bullesye, claiming he was a German spy. It seemed more likely that Simović was opposed to Radović because he had been sacked from the Yugoslav Air Force in 1938 and that Radović, a member of the Serb Agrarian Party, had been accusing Simović of incompetence. Radović, having left Istanbul for Moscow, received a chilly reception when the SOE told the Soviets about Simović's allegations on 29 September 1941, only for SOE to say two days later that there was no proof of the allegations. On 9 October 1941, Simović first told his cabinet that the leader of the Chetniks was Mihailović, writing in his memoirs: "In order to maintain complete secrecy of the existence of our rebel group on Ravna Gora from enemy intelligence services and to make sure it was not discovered prematurely I only informed the King about it. Only at the meeting on 9 October did I disclose it to the members of the cabinet, insisting they should keep the secret as long as necessary". After the meeting, Simović drafted an appeal to SOE to send more arms to the Chetniks. On 13 October 1941, Simović together with King Peter II met with Churchill and Eden to ask for SOE to do everything within its power to support the Chetniks. On 28 October 1941 Simović sent a message to the commander of the Chetniks, Draža Mihailović, and urged him to avoid premature actions and to avoid reprisals. Simović worked closely with the British Political Warfare Executive in making radio broadcasts to not only Yugoslavia, but also Bulgaria. The main theme of his broadcasts directed at Bulgarian listeners was that the Bulgarians were a fellow Slavic Orthodox people whose government had erred in siding with Germany and he appealed to Bulgarian soldiers to desert and join the Chetniks.

As prime minister of a government-in-exile, Simović did not enjoy the confidence of his cabinet who saw him as a "Yugoslav de Gaulle" who would dominate post-war Yugoslavia without them, and often plotted against him. In addition, Maček had refused to go into exile, and though he declined the German offer to head a puppet Croat government, he issued a statement urging his followers to support the new NDH (Nezavisna Država Hrvatska-Independent State of Croatia) headed by Ante Pavelić, the Poglavnik (leader) of the violently anti-Serb fascist Ustaše movement. Likewise, Džafer Kulenović and the other ministers of the Yugoslav Muslim Organization, which represented the Bosnian Muslims, also chose to stay in Yugoslavia and Kulenović joined Pavelić's cabinet as vice prime minister. Bosnia-Herzegovina had been assigned by Germany to Croatia, and Kulenović calculated that he could do more for the Bosnian Muslims serving in a cabinet in Zagreb than in London. Franc Kulovec, the leader of the Slovene People's Party, was killed in the bombing of Belgrade, without leaving a successor. In this way, the leaders of the main Croat, Slovene and Bosnian Muslim parties were absent from the cabinet that Simović headed in London. Both the Foreign Office and the Special Operations Executive thought that the Yugoslav cabinet had too many Serb ministers, and though it was scarcely Simović's fault that the ministers from the Yugoslav Muslim Organization and the Croat Peasant Party had chosen to stay in Yugoslavia, he was accused of promoting Serbs over the other peoples of Yugoslavia. The Sporazum of 1939 was unpopular with the Serbs, and Simović faced criticism from the Serb ministers that he favored making too many concessions to the Croats. Making the relations between the Serb and Croat ministers worse was the news that had reached London by summer of 1941 was the genocidal policy of the NDH towards the Serbs living within its territory. Pavelić had declared that one-third of the Serbs living in the NDH would be expelled into Serbia; one-third force would be forced to convert to Roman Catholicism and one-third would be killed. By the fall of 1941, the Serb ministers had a sense of desperation as reports of massacres of Serbs by the Ustaše arrived. However the Croat ministers believed the reports were exaggerated and were being used to discredit Croat nationalism. The cabinet meetings in London in October–November 1941 were described as being "stormy" as the Serb and Croat ministers traded accusations. In a radio broadcast on the BBC's Serbo-Croat language station on 15 November 1941, Simović called for the restoration of Yugoslavia as the only way forward for all of the South Slavic peoples, saying that despite what the Ustaše had done that Serbs and Croats were going to live again in the same state after the war. At the same time, the three deputy prime ministers, the Slovene Miha Krek, the Serb Slobodan Jovanović, and the Croat Juraj Krnjević issued a joint statement saying that after the war the political life of Yugoslavia would be based on the principles of the Atlantic Charter. The news of the genocide being waged by the Ustaše almost broke the government-in-exile as the Croat ministers wanted the Sporazum reaffirmed as the basis for post-war Yugoslavia while the Serb ministers wanted to ensure that the prečani Serbs would never again be placed under Croat rule.

Simović advised the BBC and the Political Warfare Executive that both Pavelić and Nedić could both be "safely" attacked in radio broadcasts as German "puppets" who existed to divide and rule with Pavelić being portrayed as dividing the Croats from the Serbs and Nedić being portrayed as dividing the Serbs amongst themselves. However, the Yugoslav government-in-exile tended to be softer in its attacks on Nedić who was portrayed as being a misguided man who was "not a Quisling but a Petain" vs. Pavelić who was portrayed as a murderous traitor. German policy in Serbia starting in August 1941 was to execute 100 Serbs for each German soldier killed in guerrilla attacks and to execute fifty Serbs for every German soldier wounded in guerrilla attacks. In November 1941, Simović asked the BBC's Serbo-Croatian station to "suspend" all calls for resistance until such a time that Allied forces could return to the Balkans as he complained that far too many innocent Serbs were being killed for the guerilla attacks. The other major resistance movement in Yugoslavia were the Communist Partisans led by Josip Broz Tito whose relations with the Chetniks were extremely hostile to the point that by the fall of 1941 the Partisans and the Chetniks were fighting each other. Simović had appealed to unity in his radio broadcasts as he argued that the Partisans and the Chetniks shared the same enemy to no avail.

Simović had argued that the coup of 27 March 1941 was a popular revolution that enjoyed the support of all the peoples of Yugoslavia and as the revolutionary leader he had the right to represent Yugoslavia by himself along with "distinguished personalities" he had nominated. Simović's attempt to concentrate power in his hands was stoutly resisted by the professional politicians who made up his cabinet, and he spent of much of his time as prime minister of the government-in-exile feuding with his cabinet. The leader of the dissent in the cabinet was the deputy prime minister, Slobodan Jovanović, who accused Simović of autocratic tendencies. British newspapers in 1941 lionised Simović as a hero who had sacrificed his country for the greater good of the Allied cause, and as long as Simović was feted as a hero in London, it was impossible for the politicians to persuade the king to dismiss Simović. The news that a guerrilla war was being fought in the mountains of Yugoslavia electrified the British public when the news broke in August 1941, and British newspapers portrayed Mihailović as Pavlowitch put it as an "Allied superman". The way that Mihailović was being promoted in the British newspapers allowed the politicians to argue to the king that Yugoslavia had another popular hero and there was no need for Simović anymore.

On 30 September 1941, the Yugoslav government-in-exile opened talks in London with the Greek government-in-exile for a post-war federation. The government-in-exile also reached out to President Edvard Beneš of the Czechoslovak government-in-exile for talks about some sort of Czechoslovak-Yugoslav alliance after the war. On 27 November 1941, a draft treaty was signed in London for a Greek-Yugoslav federation to be headed jointly by the kings of Yugoslavia and Greece that would come into effect after the war. The proposed federation caused a bitter dispute in the cabinet between the Foreign Minister Ninčić who wanted a federation vs. the minister without portfolio Milan Gavrilović who wanted an outright Yugoslav-Bulgarian union after the war. The Greek prime minister Emmanouil Tsouderos was opposed to a Yugoslav-Bulgarian union, which he argued would make Greece into the junior partner in the planned federation. Likewise, the Yugoslav government-in-exile was opposed to Tsouderos's plans to annex Albania and for his demand that Yugoslavia cede parts of Yugoslav Macedonia to Greece after the war. Gavrilović, the leader of the Serb Agrarian Party had been serving as the Yugoslav minister-plenipotentiary in Moscow, and Simović called him to his cabinet in London as a potential replacement for Ninčić. Instead, Gavrilović reached the conclusion that Simović was too vain to serve as effective prime minister, and joined forces with Ninčić in plotting to bring down Simović. In late December 1941, all of the ministers in the cabinet submitted a collective letter of resignation to King Peter II that accused Simović of being responsible for the defeat in April 1941 along with scheming against them and attempting to exclude them from the decision-making progress. On 11 January 1942, the king dismissed Simović as prime minister under the grounds that he had a dysfunctional relationship with his cabinet. Peter had long disliked the "tutoring" that Simović had giving him since March 1941 and readily dismissed him once it was clear he no longer enjoyed the confidence of the cabinet. The Serb ministers were deeply englamoured of their young monarch and proved in the words of Pavlowitch "unable to resist him" while the Croat ministers preferred to deal directly with Peter rather than with their cabinet colleagues, making the king a center of intrigue and scheming. Peter for his part came to much prefer "ruling" rather than "reigning". Eden made it clear to the king that his government disapproved of Simović's dismissal, seeing him as a symbol of anti-Axis resistance, as a capable leader, albeit one who could be "difficult" to deal with, and as a popular figure capable of rallying resistance against Nazi Germany.

During the course of the war, SOE's relations with the Chetniks were soured by allegations that the Chetniks had ceased to engage in resistance by 1ate 1941 and had instead become collaborators. In 1943, SOE ceased supplying arms to the Chetniks while continuing to support the Partisans. The shift was also reflected in the BBC's radio coverage in both English and Serbo-Croatian, which stopped mentioning the Chetniks in 1943 while praising the Partisans. Simović volunteered in 1943 to make a speech calling for the alliance of the Chetniks and the Partisans, which was dismissed by the BBC as "hopelessly out of date". As a generalisation, the Chetniks were stronger in Serbia and Montenegro while the Partisans were stronger in Slovenia, Croatia and Bosnia-Herzegovina. Simović complained numerous times in 1943 and 1944 that the BBC's focus on the Partisans was slighting Serbian contributions, and demanded that BBC give more coverage to the war in Serbia. Simović made several speeches on the BBC's Serbo-Croatian station calling for more Serbs to join the Partisans, which led for him to be denounced as a "traitor" by Mihailović. For Mihailović, defense of the Serb social order against a Communist revolution took precedence over resisting the occupation and Mihailović often stated that his three biggest problems were in this order the Partisans, the Ustaše and the Bosnian Muslims.

== Return to Yugoslavia ==
World War II in Europe ended in May 1945; the Constituent Assembly of Yugoslavia, dominated by Tito, formed the Federal People's Republic of Yugoslavia in November 1945. Simović returned to Belgrade from London in June 1945. In 1946 he was a witness for the prosecution in the trial of Draža Mihailović, and went on to author a number of books on military issues. He died in Belgrade in 1962.

== Sources ==
- Alexander, Martin (1992). The Republic in Danger General Maurice Gamelin and the Politics of French Defence, 1933-1940. Cambridge: Cambridge University Press. ISBN 9780521524292.
- Barker, Elisabeth (1976). British Policy in South East Europe in the Second World War. London: Palgrave Macmillan. ISBN 9781349021963.
- Biber, Dušan (1994). "The Yugoslav Coup d'etat, March 27, 1941". In John Erickson & David Dilks (ed.). Barbarossa The Axis and the Allies. Edinburgh University Press. pp. 34–42. ISBN 9781474468060.
- Biondich, Mark (2000). Stjepan Radić, the Croat Peasant Party, and the Politics of Mass Mobilization, 1904-1928. Toronto: University of Toronto Press. ISBN 9780802082947.
- Calic, Marie-Janine (2019). A History of Yugoslavia. West Lafayette: Purdue University. ISBN 978-1-55753-838-3.
- Cirković, Sima M (2004). The Serbs. Toronto: John Wiley & Sons. ISBN 9780631204718.
- Citino, Robert (2007). Death of the Wehrmacht The German Campaigns of 1942. Lawrence: University Press of Kansas. ISBN 9780700617913.
- Deakin, William (1999). "The Emergence of Colonel Mihailovic by Radio". In K. G. Robertson (ed.). War Resistance and Intelligence Collected Essays in Honour of M.R.D. Foot. London: Leo Cooper. pp. 97–104. ISBN 9780850526899.
- Higham, Robin (1985). Diary of a Disaster British Aid to Greece, 1940-1941. Lexington: University Press of Kentucky. ISBN 9780813150505.
- Jakub, Joseph (1999). Spies and Saboteurs Anglo-American Collaboration and Rivalry in Human Intelligence Collection and Special Operations, 1940-45. London: Palgrave Macmillan. ISBN 9780230373174.
- Judah, Tim (1997). The Serbs History, Myth, and the Destruction of Yugoslavia. New Haven: Yale University Press. ISBN 9780300071139.
- Keegan, John (1989). The Second World War. New York: Viking. ISBN 9780670823598.
- Pavlowitch, Stevan K. (January 1981). "Out of Context - The Yugoslav Government in London 1941-1945". Journal of Contemporary History. 16 (1): 89–118. doi:10.1177/002200948101600106.
- Pavlowitch, Stevan K. (July 1984). "Momčilo Ninčić and the European Policy of the Yugoslav Government in Exile, 1941-1943". The Slavonic and East European Review. 63 (3): 400–420.
- Karchmar, Lucien (1973). Draz̆a Mihailović and the Rise of the C̆etnik Movement, 1941-1942. Department of History, Stanford University.
- Ogden, Alan (2021). The Life and Times of Lieutenant General Adrian Carton de Wiart. London: Bloomsbury Publishing. ISBN 9781350233140.
- Rawson, Andrew (2021). Balkan Struggles A Century of Civil War, Invasion, Communism and Genocide. Barnsley: Pen and Sword. ISBN 9781526761477.
- Repe, Bożo (2024). "The Slovenes and the controversy over borders with Italy and Austria after the First World War". In Stefano Bianchini (ed.). Italy, Yugoslavia, and the Controversy Over the Adriatic Region, 1915-1920 Strategic Expectations and Geopolitical Realities in the Aftermath of the Great War. London: Taylor & Francis. pp. 62–84. ISBN 9781040124352.
- Rothschild, Joseph (2016). East Central Europe Between the Two World Wars. Seattle: University of Washington Press. ISBN 9780295803647.
- Savic, Ivan; Shirkey, Zachary C. (2017). Uncertainty, Threat, and International Security. London: Taylor & Francis. ISBN 9781317050384.
- Stenton, Michael (2000). Radio London and Resistance in Occupied Europe British Political Warfare 1939-1943. Oxford: Oxford University Press. ISBN 9780191543210.
- Stefanidis, Ioannis (2012). Substitute for Power: Wartime British Propaganda to the Balkans, 1939–44. London: Routledge. ISBN 978-1409455028.
- Stockings, Craig; Hancock, Eleanor (2013). Swastika Over the Acropolis Re-interpreting the Nazi Invasion of Greece in World War II. Leiden: Brill. ISBN 9789004254596.
- Wheeler, Mark (2006). "Resistance from abroad; Anglo-Soviet efforts to co-ordinate Yugoslav resistance, 1941-1942". Special Operations Executive A New Instrument of War. London: Routledge. p. 103=121. ISBN 9780415383981.
- Whittam, J. R. (April 1991). "Drawing the Line: Britain and the Emergence of the Trieste Question, January 1941-May 1945". The English Historical Review. 106 (419): 346–370. doi:10.1093/ehr/CVI.CCCCXIX.346.
- Zakić, Mirna (2017). Ethnic Germans and National Socialism in Yugoslavia in World War II. Cambridge: Cambridge University Press. ISBN 9781107171848.

Political offices
Preceded by Dragiša Cvetković	Prime Minister of Yugoslavia; 1941 – 1942	Succeeded by Slobodan Jovanović
Preceded by Office established	Minister of the Air Force and Navy of the Yugoslav government-in-exile 1941–1942	Succeeded by Dragoljub Mihailović
Military offices
Preceded by Milutin Nedić	Chief of the General Staff of the Yugoslav Royal Army; 1938 – 1940	Succeeded by Petar Kosić
Preceded by Petar Kosić	Chief of the General Staff of the Yugoslav Royal Army; 1941	Succeeded by Danilo Kalafatović
Preceded by Petar Bojović	Deputy Commander in Chief of the Yugoslavian Armed Forces; 1941–1942	Succeeded by Petar Živković
