= Živan Knežević =

Serbian major

Colonel Živan Knežević
- Живан Кнежевић
- Born: July 28, 1906; Vranje, Kingdom of Serbia
- Died: December 1, 1984 (aged 78); Seattle, Washington, U.S.
- Relatives: Radoje Knežević (brother)
- Military career
- Allegiance: Kingdom of Yugoslavia
- Branch: Royal Guards
- Rank: Colonel

Živan Knežević (Serbian Cyrillic: Живан Кнежевић; 28 July 1906 – 1 December 1984) was a major in the Yugoslav Royal Guards who was a key conspirator in the Yugoslav coup d'état of 27 March 1941 that deposed the regency of Prince Paul, Dr. Radenko Stanković and Dr. Ivo Perović, as well as the government of Prime Minister Dragiša Cvetković.

Knežević and his fellow plotters declared the 17-year-old King Peter to be of age and brought to power a government of national unity led by Air Force General Dušan Simović. The coup resulted in the German-led Axis invasion of Yugoslavia during which the armed forces of Yugoslavia were defeated within 11 days. Fleeing the country by air, Knežević was based in Alexandria for a period, where he briefly commanded a battalion of Yugoslav Royal Guards formed with British assistance. He subsequently served as a military liaison officer between the Chetniks of Draža Mihailović and the Yugoslav government-in-exile then after promotion to lieutenant colonel he served as a military attaché in the United States until the end of the war, by which time he had achieved the rank of colonel. He remained in the US after the war and died in 1984.
