= Yugoslav regency =

The Yugoslav regency was a three-member governorship of the Kingdom of Yugoslavia headed by Prince Regent Paul in place of King Peter II until his coming of age. It was in effect between November 1934 and the coup d'état of 27 March 1941.

== Background ==
On 9 October 1934 IMRO member Vlado Chernozemski assassinated King Alexander I in Marseille in France, and Alexander's cousin Prince Paul took the regency. In his will, Alexander had stipulated that if he died, a council of regents chaired by Paul should govern until Alexander's son Peter II came of age.

== Members ==
- Prince Paul of Yugoslavia
- Radenko Stanković
- Ivo Perović

== History ==
Prince Paul, far more than Alexander, was Yugoslav rather than Serb in outlook (Yugoslavism versus Serbian nationalism). However, unlike Alexander, he inclined much more toward democracy. In its broadest outline, his domestic policy worked to eliminate the heritage of Alexander's centralism, censorship, and military control and to pacify the country by solving the Serb-Croat problem.

== Sources ==
- Hoptner, Jacob B. (1962). Yugoslavia in Crisis, 1934-1941.
- Драган Суботић (1997). Српски монархизам у прошлости и данас. БИНА.
- Jacob B. Hoptner; Časlav M. Nikitović (1964). Jugoslavija u krizi, 1934-1941. Columbia University Press.
- Dušan Mrđenović (1988). Ustavi i vlade Kneževine Srbije, Kraljevine Srbije, Kraljevine SHS i Kraljevine Jugoslavije, 1835-1941. Nova knj. ISBN 9788673350660.
- Wayne S. Vucinich; Jozo Tomasevich (1969). Contemporary Yugoslavia: Twenty Years of Socialist Experiment. University of California Press. pp. 22–. GGKEY:5JR74ERLNET.
