= Borivoje Mirković =

Royal Yugoslav Air Force general (1884–1969)

Brigadier General Borivoje Mirković
- Боривоје Мирковић
- Born: 23 September 1884; Valjevo, Kingdom of Serbia
- Died: 21 August 1969 (aged 84); London, United Kingdom
- Spouse: Mira Mirković (1930–37; her death)
- Military career
- Allegiance: (Kingdom of Serbia) Serbia (1907–18) (Kingdom of Yugoslavia) Yugoslavia (1918–42)
- Branch: Air Force
- Rank: Brigadier General
- Nickname: Bora
- Commands: Royal Yugoslav Air Force; Royal Yugoslav Air Force (in-exile)

Borivoje Mirković (Serbian Cyrillic: Боривоје Мирковић; 23 September 1884 – 21 August 1969) was a brigadier general in the Royal Yugoslav Air Force.

== Early life ==
Borivoje Mirković was born to Jovan and Smiljana Mirković on 23 September 1884 in Valjevo, Kingdom of Serbia. He entered the Serbian Army in 1907. In 1930, he married a woman named Mira. She died in 1937.

== World War II ==
Mirković led and organised the Yugoslav coup d'état of 27 March 1941 that deposed the regency of Prince Paul, Dr. Radenko Stanković and Dr. Ivo Perović, as well as the government of Prime Minister Dragiša Cvetković. Mirković and his fellow plotters declared the 17-year-old Prince Peter to be of age and brought to power a government of national unity led by Air Force General Dušan Simović. The coup was carried out at British instigation and involved British intelligence operatives. Mirković and the other plotters were all funded by the British. The coup resulted in the German-led invasion of Yugoslavia on 6 April 1941 during which the armed forces of Yugoslavia were defeated within 11 days. On 14 April 1941, Mirković handed command of the air force to Colonel Petar Vukčević, the commander of the 4th Bomber Brigade. On 16 April, he was fleeing the country by air when the aircraft he was travelling in was hit by Greek anti-aircraft fire near Preveza, and crashed. Mirković was seriously injured. He was based in Cairo for a period, where he was involved with a faction of the Yugoslav government-in-exile that was supported by British intelligence in Egypt. He died in London on 21 August 1969.
