= Naidăș =

- Commune
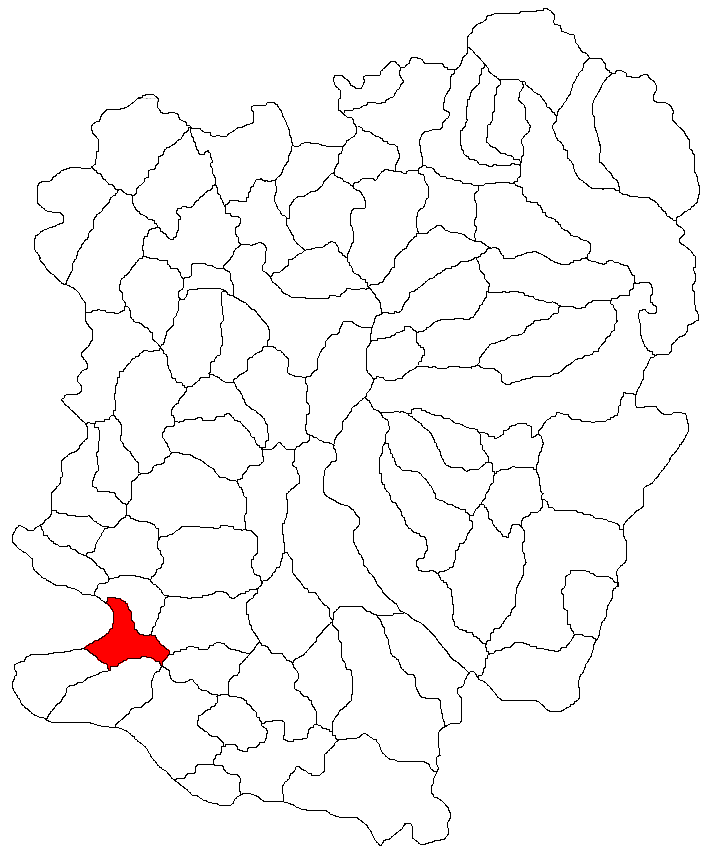
- Location in Caraș-Severin County

- Location in Romania
- Coordinates: 44°53′N 21°35′E
- Country: Romania
- County: Caraș-Severin

Government
  - Mayor (2020–2024): Marius Pohanka (PNL)
- Area: 41.57 km^{2} (16.05 sq mi)
- Elevation: 126 m (413 ft)
- Population (2021-12-01): 944
  - Density: 23/km^{2} (59/sq mi)
- Time zone: EET/EEST (UTC+2/+3)
- Postal code: 327280
- Area code: +(40) 255
- Vehicle reg.: CS
- Website: primarianaidas.ro

Naidăș (Hungarian: Néranádas) is a commune in Caraș-Severin County, Banat, western Romania with a population of 944 people as of 2021. It is composed of two villages, Lescovița (Néramogyorós; Serbian: Лесковица) and Naidăș.

Naidăș is the site of a border crossing with Serbia. The village of Kaluđerovo is on the opposite side.

== Natives ==
- Radenko Stanković (1880 – 1956), Regent of Yugoslavia from 1934 to 1941
