= Belgrade Town Hall Building =

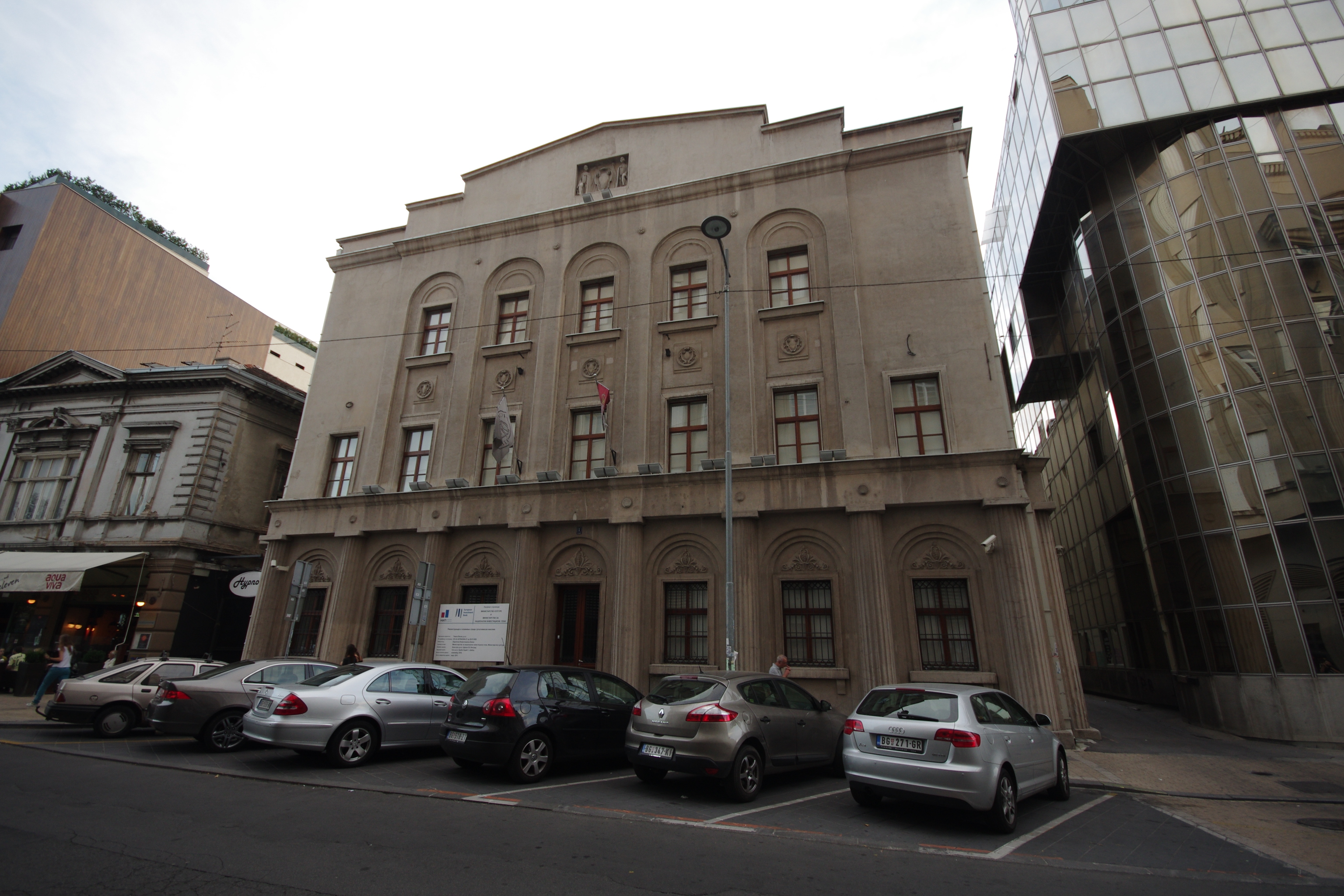
- Belgrade Town Hall Building
- Interactive map of the Belgrade Town Hall Building area

General information
- Location: Belgrade, Serbia
- Coordinates: 44.8198°N 20.4559°E
- Opened: 1846

Belgrade Town Hall building is located at 1 Uzun Mirkova Street, in Belgrade, and has the status of the cultural monument. It was built around 1846, during the reign of Prince Aleksandar Karađorđević, and is located on the site of the former Great bazaar. In the second half of the 19th century, the area around the Great Bazaar was the venue of the administrative and educational life of the capital. The hotel worked until 1869, when the name "Serbian Crown" was overtaken by the restaurant at 56 Knez Mihailova Street . During the period of almost one century, the building at the Great Bazaar served the needs of Belgrade municipality. The building was constructed as two-storey object with classically shaped front facade, whose symmetry was achieved with the shallow central Avant-corps with attic above the cornice. The reconstructions and the addition of the floor from 1928 significantly changed the appearance of the building. Today`s facade is dominated by the monumental fluted semi-columns in the ground floor zone, and lunette windows. Nowadays, Yugoslav Film Archive is placed in the building.

== History ==
The building of the former Belgrade town hall was built as the konak of Prince Aleksandar Karađorđević in the centre of the Belgrade town which was intended for the construction of public and representative buildings. Soon after the erection, probably around 1853, the building was rented to the inn. The name of the owner provided for the right to name it "Serbian Crown".

At first only foreign guests stayed in it. Since 1853, the building is mentioned as the second hotel in Belgrade, called "The new edifice" or "Serbian Crown", in which the most respectful guests stayed, and which was the venue of many important historical, cultural and social events. The balls, theatre plays, musical performances and painting exhibitions were held there. The inn very soon gain a good reputation.

In 1868 Prince Aleksandar Karađorđević, as the main suspect for the organization of the murder of Prince Мihailo Obrenović, was convicted to twenty years imprisonment and the Law was issued according to which all immovable properties that he owned in Serbia were to be sold out. On that grounds, "Serbian Crown" was sold to the Belgrade Municipality for the accommodation of the Municipality Court. On the authorization of the Ministry of Internal Affairs, the old company along with its name was conceded to the inn at the end of Knez Mihailova Street, opposite the Belgrade Fortress, which was just about to be opened. From that moment, and for the next almost one hundred years, the development of the city administration has been connected to this building. Since 1839, according to the law which defined the organization of municipalities, Belgrade got the special treatment which it will preserve regardless to all changes, which certain laws are going to make in order to regulate the issue of municipal administration. Although the institution of municipal self-government developed along with the development of the state administration, the Belgrade Town Hall building remained the representative of the municipal power.

After the First World War, when Belgrade became the capital of significantly larger country, the Municipality building became insufficient for the accommodation of all its departments. That is why the decision was made to build a new, representative building. Despite the decision, the constant lack of funds kept postponing the construction of the new building, so in 1928 it was decided that the already existing two-storey building should be upgraded and expanded. The design was done in the Construction department of the Municipality. The renewed building was solemnly unveiled on the occasion of the tenth anniversary of the Union of Serbs, Croats and Slovenes into one country, on 1 December 1928. The Municipality, then called The Assembly of the City of Belgrade was situated in this building until 1961. From 1961 to 1992 The Patent Institute was placed in the building. In 1992 the building was assigned to the Yugoslav Film Archive, which completely reconstructed it and adjusted it to the new needs. The building was solemnly unveiled in 2011.

Among many events related to the building in Uzun Mirkova Street, the following should be mentioned: the reception on the occasion of Saint Andrew`s Day Assembly, awarding the Legion of Honour 1920 and the trial to the General Ler and to the senior German officers in 1945.

== Architecture ==
The old Belgrade Town hall building was erected as a two-storey structure designed according to the mixed stylistic elements of classicism and romanticism. It had the base of irregular quadrilateral shape, conditioned by the shape of the plot. It was built in the regulation line which later on conditioned the regulation of the street as well as two side approaches. It had one tavern and the inn, 12 equipped rooms for passengers, 4 rooms and 1 guest hall, a kitchen, a laundry room, a stable for 30 horses, a wine cellar, a basement for the firewood and the shed for the carriage.

An additional floor was built in 1928 and the building was completely reshaped according to the principles of academic interwar architecture. The need for representativeness was resolved with the sequence of leaned columns on the ground floor and by setting up the sculptures, which represented the senators on the consoles between the first-floor windows. The author of the sculptures was the sculptor Dragomir Arambašić. The interior was specifically marked by the City Council conference hall, with domineering shallow reliefs and frescoes presenting Belgrade, the work of Živorad Nastasijević .

In the meantime, the sculptures disappeared from the facade and the frescoes were covered with emblems. The building was completely renewed for the purposes of the Yugoslav Film Archive. Its interior was designed by the аrchitect Pavle Vasev. In 1983, the Belgrade Town Hall building was declared a cultural monument for being representative of the development of municipal self-administration in Serbia.

== See more ==
- Spisak spomenika kulture u Beogradu
