= Ivan Andres =

Croatian lawyer and politician

- Born: 11 May 1883; Vinkovci, Kingdom of Croatia-Slavonia, Austria-Hungary (now Croatia)
- Died: 17 March 1959 (aged 75); Zagreb, People's Republic of Croatia, Federal People's Republic of Yugoslavia
- Education: University of Zagreb
- Occupations: Lawyer, politician
- Political party: Croatian Peasant Party

Ivan Andres (11 May 1883 in Vinkovci – 17 March 1959 in Zagreb) was a Croatian lawyer and politician. He graduated and obtained a doctoral degree from the Faculty of Law, University of Zagreb. Andres was a judge in Varaždin and Zagreb and the secretary of the government of the Kingdom of Croatia-Slavonia until 1919. After the World War I, Andres pursued legal career, distinguishing himself as a defence attorney of political opponents of the Kingdom of Serbs, Croats and Slovenes (later renamed Yugoslavia). At the same time, he was also the legal counsel of the French Consulate in Zagreb. As a member of the Croatian Peasant Party (HSS), Andres was elected to the Yugoslav parliament on the HSS ticket in 1935 and 1938 in the district of Rab. He was appointed the Trade and Industry Minister in the government of Dragiša Cvetković formed following the 1939 Cvetković–Maček Agreement.
