= Milan Gavrilović =

Yugoslav diplomat

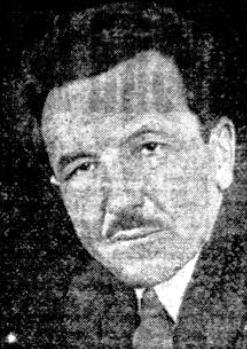
- Born: 23 November 1882; Belgrade, Principality of Serbia
- Died: 1 January 1976 (aged 93); Bethesda, Maryland, U.S.

Milan Gavrilović (Serbian Cyrillic: Милан Гавриловић; 23 November 1882 – 1 January 1976) was a Serbian lawyer, diplomat, senator, and politician.

He is one of the founders of the Agrarian Party and after 1939 was its leader. He was the director of Politika (1924−1930). Gavrilović was first ambassador of the Kingdom of Yugoslavia to the Soviet Union (1940−1941). He served as Minister of Justice, Agriculture, Supply and Food in the émigré government-in-exile in London.

He was also a Chetnik volunteer in 1912 in the First Balkan War.

== Biography ==
Gavrilović was born in Belgrade on 23 November 1882, in the family of Uroš Gavrilović and Agnjica Božić. As a student in 1905, Gavrilović was a participant in the Chetnik action. He was wounded as a Chetnik in the Battle of Čelopek near Staro Nagoričane. Gavrilović received his doctorate in Paris and was a diplomat. He also performed the duty of the secretary to Nikola Pašić. Like Milan Rakić, who was also a diplomat, Gavrilović took leave from the Ministry of Foreign Affairs to take part in the First Balkan War as a Chetnik volunteer.

He served as a diplomat in London, Athens, Berlin, and Rome. From June 1940, he was the ambassador of the Kingdom of Yugoslavia to the Soviet Union. Following the death of Jovan Jovanović Pijon in 1939, Gavrilović became head of the Agrarian Party.

Gavrilović was a journalist since his student days. He was the editor-in-chief of Politika. He accepted participation in the government from 27 March 1941, which gathered representatives of parliamentary political parties rooted in the people. Before the German Invasion of Yugoslavia, Gavrilović was an envoy of the Kingdom of Yugoslavia to the Soviet Union. His status as the official Yugoslav representative in Moscow ended on 6 May 1941, when the Soviet government declared him an ordinary citizen. At the end of July 1941, he was appointed charge d'affaires of the Royal Yugoslav government-in-exile in Moscow. Upon his arrival in London in January 1942, he was appointed Minister of Justice in the government of Slobodan Jovanović.

He also cooperated with Slobodan Jovanović in the Yugoslav People's Committee (1944), and at the trial of General Draža Mihailović, he was convicted in absentia together with Slobodan Jovanović. After the war, Gavrilović lived in exile in the United States, where he died on 1 January 1976.

His written legacy, created in the period from 1938 to 1976, was transferred in November 2013 from the Hoover Institution of Stanford University in the USA to the Archives of Yugoslavia.

== Literature ==
- Tomasevich, Jozo (1975): War and Revolution in Yugoslavia, 1941–1945: The Chetniks. Stanford: Stanford University Press. ISBN 978-0-8047-0857-9.
- Radojević, Mira (2010): "The Emigrant Government of the Kingdom of Yugoslavia on Yugoslav-Soviet Relations (Milan Gavrilović's Views)". Liberation of Belgrade 1944: Proceedings. Belgrade: Institute for Recent History of Serbia. p. 31—51.
- Radojevic, Mira (2012): "Milan Gavrilović on the idea of the Balkan community 1941-1945" (PDF). Our past. 13: 175—187. Archived from the original (PDF) on July 27, 2018. Accessed July 27, 2018.
