= Radenko Stanković =

Radenko Stanković (April 26, 1880 – December 5, 1956) was Regent of Yugoslavia for the underage Peter II from 1934 to 1941, alongside Prince Paul, the head of the regency, and Ivo Perović.

The son of a priest, he was born in Néramogyorós (Leskovica), Austria-Hungary, which today is Lescovița village, Caraș-Severin County, Romania. Leaving his native village while a schoolboy, he attended high school in Novi Sad. He began his university studies at what is now the Innsbruck Medical University and completed them at the University of Vienna, later coming to be known as the father of cardiology in Serbia.

Forced to retire in 1946, he was arrested in 1949 by the Yugoslav Communist regime. Accused of collaborating with the German occupiers, he was sentenced to twelve years' imprisonment and had his assets seized, including an expensive house in Fruška Gora. He became severely ill while in prison, due to which he was released, and died in Belgrade in his son's home several months later.
