= Ivo Perović =

Regent of Yugoslavia

Ivo Perović (1882−1958) was one member of a three-person regency of Yugoslavia for the underage Peter II from 1934 to 1941. He was a Croat who took little part in politics. Perović was also the ban of the Sava Banovina from 1931 to 1935.
