= Petar Baćović =

World War II Chetnik leader

vojvoda Petar Baćović
- Петар Баћовић
- Born: 1898; Kalinovik, Condominium of Bosnia and Herzegovina, Austria-Hungary
- Died: April 1945 (aged 46/47); Jasenovac concentration camp, Independent State of Croatia
- Military career
- Allegiance: Yugoslavia (–1941); Chetniks (1941–1945); Germany (1941–1943); Government of National Salvation (1941–1942); Italy (1942–1943)
- Branch: Army
- Rank: Major
- Nickname: Kalinovički
- Commands: Chetniks in eastern Bosnia and Herzegovina
- Conflicts: World War II in Yugoslavia: 1942 Montenegro offensive; Operation Alfa; Case White; Battle of Lijevče Field

Petar Baćović (Serbo-Croatian Cyrillic: Петар Баћовић; 1898 – April 1945) was a Bosnian Serb Chetnik commander within occupied Yugoslavia during World War II. From the summer of 1941 until April 1942, he headed the cabinet of the Ministry of Internal Affairs for Milan Nedić's puppet Government of National Salvation in the German-occupied territory of Serbia. In May and June 1942, Baćović participated in the joint Italian–Chetnik offensive against the Yugoslav Partisans in Montenegro. In July 1942, Baćović was appointed by the Chetnik leader Draža Mihailović and his Supreme Command as the commander of the Chetnik units in the regions of eastern Bosnia and Herzegovina within the Axis puppet state, the Independent State of Croatia (NDH). In this role, Baćović continued collaborating with the Italians against the Yugoslav Partisans, with his Chetniks formally recognised as Italian auxiliaries from mid-1942.

Along with other Chetniks, in August and September 1942 Baćović and his Chetniks carried out massacres of Bosnian Muslim and Croat civilians and those sympathetic to the Partisan movement, amounting to more than 5,000 dead. The following month, while participating in a joint Italian–German operation around Prozor, Operation Alfa, Baćović and his Chetniks burnt Croat and Muslim villages and killed between 500 and 2,000 Croats and Muslims. The Italians reacted strongly to this and threatened to withdraw their support for the Chetniks, after which Baćović attempted to distance himself from the killings. Baćović's Chetniks committed further atrocities against Croats and Muslims in Mostar and Konjic in November and Vrlika in January 1943. In early 1943, Baćović was appointed as a vojvoda (warlord) by the ailing principal Chetnik leader in Herzegovina, Ilija Trifunović-Birčanin. Baćović engaged in considerable antisemitic propaganda aimed at the Partisan leadership.

In April 1945, he was captured near Banja Luka by elements of the Armed Forces of the Independent State of Croatia (HOS) along with Chetnik leaders Pavle Đurišić and Zaharije Ostojić, and Chetnik ideologue Dragiša Vasić in what was apparently a trap. According to some sources, Baćović and the others were taken to the area of the Jasenovac concentration camp, where they were killed.

== Early life ==
Petar Baćović was born in 1898 in Kalinovik, a village within the Bosnia Vilayet, a province of the Ottoman Empire that was occupied by Austria-Hungary in 1878. It is now in Bosnia and Herzegovina. His father Maksim was a clan chief. Prior to World War II, Baćović was a major in the Royal Yugoslav Army reserve. He also studied law, did legal work, and was a governor's notary immediately prior to the outbreak of war.

== World War II ==
=== Ministry of Internal Affairs under Nedić ===
From the summer of 1941, Baćović headed the cabinet of the Ministry of Internal Affairs for Milan Nedić's German-installed puppet Government of National Salvation in the German-occupied territory of Serbia. Chetnik leader Draža Mihailović, with no direct control over the many independent Chetnik bands throughout partitioned and occupied Yugoslavia, had been corresponding with some of their leaders via letter and courier. Following an agreement between Nedić and Mihailović, in April 1942 Baćović left Belgrade and went to join the Chetniks operating in eastern Bosnia, then part of the Axis puppet state, the Independent State of Croatia (Croatian: Nezavisna Država Hrvatska, NDH). He was sent as Mihailović's permanent representative to Dobroslav Jevđević and Ilija Trifunović-Birčanin, the main spokesmen for the Chetniks operating in Herzegovina.

=== 1942 Montenegro offensive ===
From mid-May to early June 1942, Baćović took part in the joint Italian-Chetnik 1942 Montenegro offensive against the Partisans, which also included operations in eastern Herzegovina. Baćović led Chetnik forces fighting against the Partisans in the Sandžak region that straddled the border between the Italian governorate of Montenegro and the German-occupied territory of Serbia. His troops fought alongside Sandžak Chetniks led by Zdravko Kasalović and Vojislav Lukačević, and the Požega Chetnik detachment led by Vučko Ignjatović and Miloš Glišić. The Požega Chetniks had been "legalised" as auxiliaries by the Nedić puppet government with the approval of the Germans. These forces also fought alongside the Italian 19th Infantry Division Venezia and 5th Alpine Division Pusteria, and were one of three main Chetnik formations involved in the joint offensive, the others being led by the Montenegrin Serbs Pavle Đurišić and Bajo Stanišić. In the face of the three-pronged assault, the outnumbered Partisan forces withdrew from Montenegro and eastern Herzegovina into southeastern Bosnia, and then undertook the Partisan Long March to western Bosnia. At the end of May, Baćović submitted a report to Mihailović on Đurišić's troops and the significant amounts of weapons and equipment he had received from the Italians.

=== Legalization by the Italians ===
In the summer of 1942, after order had been established in significant parts of the Italian occupation zone of the NDH, Chetnik detachment leaders including Petar Samardžić, Momčilo Đujić, Uroš Drenović, Jevđević, Trifunović-Birčanin, and their principal political spokesmen with Italian Second Army headquarters were recognized as auxiliaries by the Italians. Early in that summer, the commander of the Italian Second Army, Generale designato d’armata (acting General) Mario Roatta, agreed to the delivery of arms, munitions, and supplies to the Chetniks. On 16 July 1942, Baćović, acting as one of Jevđević's military organizers, informed Mihailović that the vast majority of the 7,000 Chetniks in Herzegovina were well-equipped with small arms and had been "legalized" by the Italians. Combined with Đujić's group, the number of "legalized" Chetniks in the Italian zone of the NDH stood at 10,000 or more.

From March 1942 on, Mihailović had been looking for opportunities to create a "national corridor" connecting all the Chetnik groups operating in the Italian-occupied areas of the NDH, from Montenegro, Herzegovina, Dalmatia, to Lika and western Bosnia. In June, to advance Mihailović's aim, Jevđević offered to send 2,000 Herzegovinian Chetniks to Dalmatia, where they would be placed under the control of Trifunović-Birčanin. Transfer of Chetnik forces to Dalmatia also created an opportunity to strike at the major concentration of Partisan strength at that time, which was in western Bosnia.

In early June 1942, Chetniks under the command of Baćović and Glišić combined to attack the Partisans. They quickly advanced on Foča forcing the Partisans to retreat to Gacko. The Chetniks encountered NDH forces, and captured the town from them on June 10. On this occasion the Muslim population of the town was not harmed. Their capture of the town was only temporary, as the Italians, pressured by the Germans and NDH authorities, order the Chetniks to withdrawn on 13 June, and Baćović released NDH soldiers his forces had captured. Following the withdrawal of the Chetniks, NDH troops attacked them, but after a skirmish the Chetniks repelled the attack. Baćović complained to the Italian general Giovanni Esposito about this incident.

=== Zimonjić Kula conference ===
On 22 and 23 July 1942, (Note: Hoare gives the date of this conference as 13 July, but both Milazzo and Jelić-Butić state it occurred on 22–23 July, and Tomasevich mentions that Trifunović-Birčanin met with Mihailović at Avtovac on 21 July.) Mihailović held a conference at Zimonjić Kula, near Avtovac in eastern Herzegovina, which was attended by Trifunović-Birčanin, Đurišić, Jevđević, Zaharije Ostojić, Radovan Ivanišević, Milan Šantić and a group of Chetnik commanders from Herzegovina. The purpose of the meeting was to establish co-operation between the Herzegovinian and Montenegrin Chetnik leaders. Baćović was appointed as the Chetnik commander for eastern Bosnia and Herzegovina, replacing Boško Todorović, who had been captured and executed by the Partisans in late February 1942. Trifunović-Birčanin was appointed the Chetnik commander for Dalmatia, Lika and western Bosnia.

The historian Fikreta Jelić-Butić believes that the idea of an anti-Partisan offensive was also discussed at the conference as a potential response to the Zagreb agreement concluded between Italy and the NDH in June. The Zagreb agreement heralded a major drawdown of Italian occupation forces from large areas of the NDH, including areas of Bosnia south of the Italian-German demarcation line, as well as Kordun, Lika and Dalmatia, and the Chetnik leaders believed that this would reduce the area in which they could operate with Italian consent. On the second day of the conference, Jevđević and Trifunović-Birčanin travelled to nearby Trebinje and conferred with two other Chetnik commanders, Radmilo Grđić and Milan Šantić, who agreed on a set of goals and a strategy to achieve them:

- the creation of Greater Serbia;
- the destruction of the Partisans;
- the removal of the Catholics (Croats) and Muslims;
- non-recognition of the NDH;
- no collaboration with the Germans; and
- temporary collaboration with the Italians for weapons, munitions and food.

The Chetniks addressed a crowd in Trebinje, announcing that they had cells in every village in eastern Herzegovina, and were establishing a Greater Serbia. Only five days after Baćović's appointment, the commander of the Mountain Staff of the Bosnian Chetnik Detachments, Stevan Botić, demanded Baćović be replaced. Botić had appointed himself as commander of the Mountain Staff after the previous commander, Jezdimir Dangić, had been arrested in Bajina Bašta in April 1942. Botić and his allies opposed Mihailović's control because they favoured a political rather than strictly military organisation, wanted to continue the alliance with the Nedić regime that Dangić had forged, and opposed the control of Bosnian Chetniks by non-Bosnians. Botić also wanted to remain independent of Mihailović so that he could freely kill Muslims and Bosnian Croats without damaging Mihailović's standing with the Serb people through close association with Botić's activities. Soon after the conference, both Baćović and Trifunović-Birčanin were negotiating with Italian VI Corps and XVIII Corps headquarters staff regarding the proposed offensive against the Partisans in western Bosnia.

By August, Baćović was advocating the "liquidation" of Botić's Mountain Staff because they were creating disunity, and trying to politicise the Chetnik movement in Bosnia and Herzegovina on the model of the League of Farmers, which had defended the interests of Bosnian Serb peasants against Muslim landowners during the interwar period. On 6 August 1942, in a continued Chetnik effort to eliminate external enemies and purge their own ranks, Baćović ordered the subordinate commanders of all corps and brigades to submit lists of such individuals with suggestions on how to deal with them. Brigade commanders were required to send three assassins to kill any person whom they labelled with the letter "Z" (from the Serbo-Croatian Latin: zaklati, meaning "to slaughter") within 24 hours of receiving the name. Baćović demanded that "the killing has to be done exclusively through the use of slaughtering knife".

=== Capture of Foča and massacres of Muslims and Croats ===
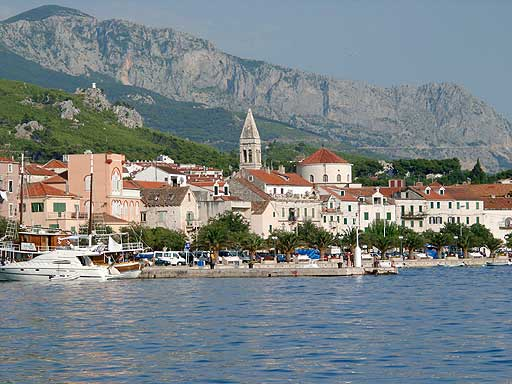
Baćović's Chetniks killed 900 Croats in villages around the coastal town of Makarska.

On 19 August, Chetniks commanded by Ostojić, but drawn mainly from Đurišić's Lim-Sandžak Chetnik Detachment and acting on the orders of Mihailović, attacked and captured the eastern Bosnian town of Foča, which had been abandoned by the Partisans in June and had then been occupied by NDH forces. After a two-hour battle, Chetnik units entered Foča and began massacring the Muslim population of the town, regardless of gender and age. According to the initial Chetnik reports, a total of 1,000 people were killed, including about 450 members of the Croatian Home Guard and Ustaše Militia, as well as around 300 women and children. Later Chetnik reports stated that between 2,000 and 3,000 were killed in Foča after its capture. A few days after they seized Foča, Baćović and Jevđević reported to Mihailović that all traces of the massacre had been removed and they had formally announced that those responsible for looting and killing had been shot. Eight days after the capture of Foča, Baćović wrote, "on that occasion 1,200 Ustaše in uniform and about 1,000 compromised Muslims perished, while we suffered only four dead and five wounded".

In a field near Ustikolina and Jahorina in eastern Bosnia, the Chetniks of Baćović and Ostojić massacred about 2,500 Muslims and burned a number of villages. Baćović also killed a number of Partisan sympathizers elsewhere. In August 1942, Baćović and his Chetniks participated in the Italian anti-Partisan Operation Albia, and on 29 August killed 141 Croats in the Makarska region and razed four villages. In September, Baćović completed a tour of Chetnik units in Herzegovina, and reported that the morale of the population was excellent and that the actions of the Ustaše and Partisans were drawing the populace to the Chetniks. That same month, his Chetniks killed 900 Croats during the Makarska massacre. Baćović's reports made it plain that his forces were conducting planned operations to kill or drive out the Muslim and Catholic population of Herzegovina. One of these reports stated that during reprisal attacks against the towns of Ljubuški in western Herzegovina and Imotski in the Dalmatian hinterland, his Chetniks had skinned alive three Catholic priests, killed all males over fifteen years of age, and razed 17 villages.

=== Operation Alfa and subsequent massacres ===
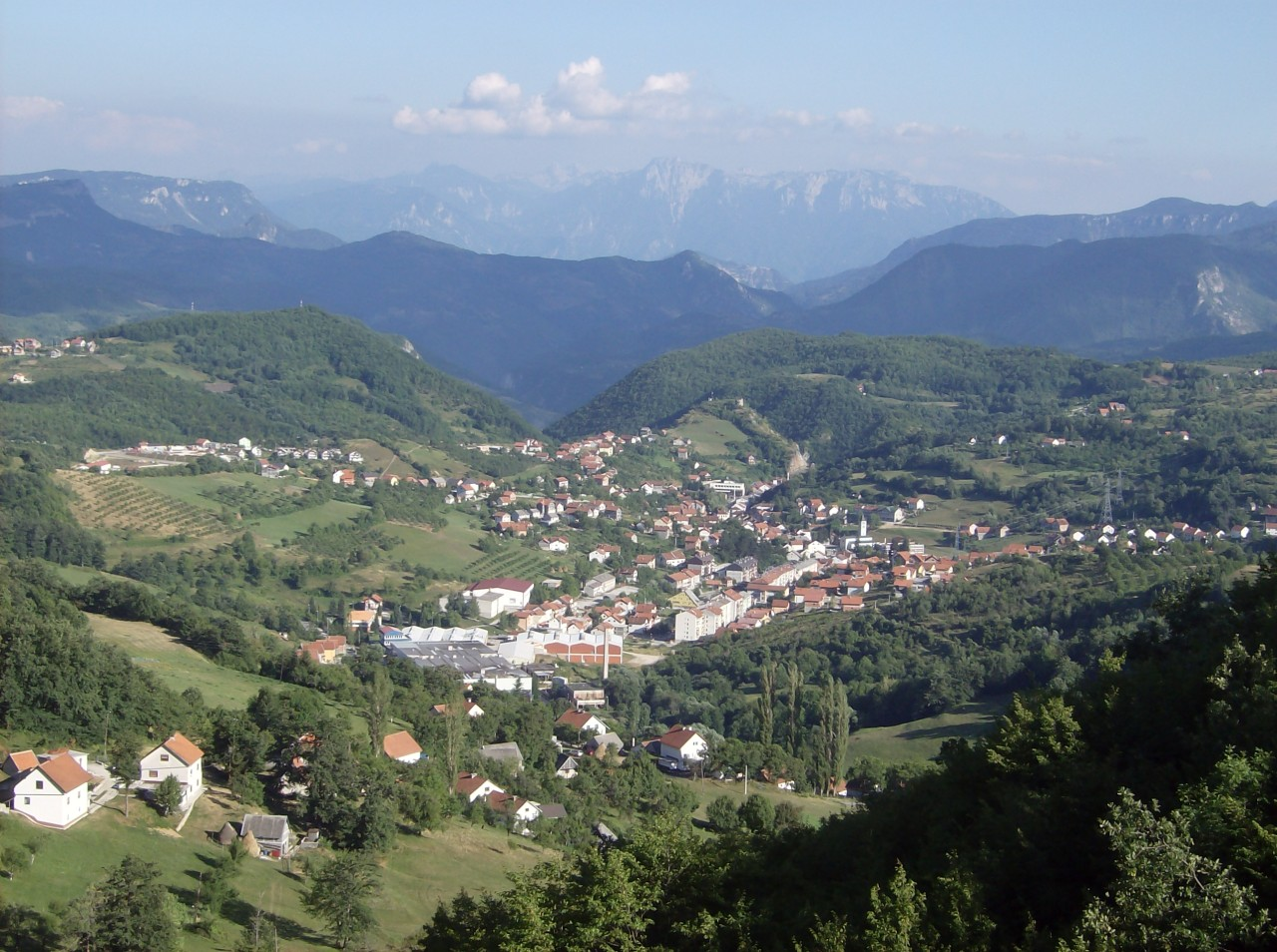
Baćović's Chetniks killed hundreds of Muslim and Croat civilians in Prozor in October 1942, during the Italian-led Operation Alfa.

Towards the end of August 1942, Mihailović issued directives to Chetnik units ordering them to prepare for a large scale anti-Partisan operation alongside Italian and NDH troops. In September 1942, aware that they were unable to defeat the Partisans alone, the Chetniks tried to persuade the Italians to undertake a large operation against the Partisans in western Bosnia. Trifunović-Birčanin met with Roatta on 10 and 21 September and urged him to undertake this operation as soon as possible to clear the Partisans from the Prozor–Livno area and offered 7,500 Chetniks as aid on the condition that they be provided with the necessary arms and supplies. He was successful in obtaining some arms and promises of action. The proposed operation, faced with opposition from Ustaše leader Ante Pavelić and a cautious Italian high command, was nearly cancelled, but after Jevđević and Trifunović-Birčanin promised to cooperate with Croat and Muslim anti-Partisan units, it went ahead, with less Chetnik involvement.

Baćović and Jevđević, with 3,000 Herzegovinian Chetniks, participated in the Italian-led Operation Alfa, which involved a two-pronged thrust towards Prozor. The Chetniks fought alongside the Italian 18th Infantry Division Messina as they advanced from the line of the Neretva River, while the German 714th and 718th Infantry Divisions, and NDH forces drove from the north. Before the offensive Baćović had openly announced his plans to destroy entire Muslim villages. Prozor and some smaller towns were captured by the combined Italian–Chetnik force. Chetniks under Baćović and Jevđević's command participated enthusiastically in the operation, burning Croat and Muslim villages and killing civilians. Between 14 and 15 October, the Herzegovinian Chetniks massacred over 500 Muslims and Croats and razed several villages, alleging that they had "harbored and aided the Partisans". On 23 October, Baćović reported to Mihailović that "in the operation in Prozor we slaughtered more than 2,000 Croats and Muslims. Our soldiers returned enthusiastic". According to the historian Jozo Tomasevich, incomplete data shows that 543 civilians were massacred. At least 656 victims have been listed by name, while another source states that about 848 people were killed, mainly "children, women, and the elderly". Historian Ivo Goldstein also mentions an estimate of 1,500 victims, and attributes the discrepancy "to the fact that the estimates refer to different territories".

Roatta objected to these "massive slaughters" of noncombatant civilians and threatened to halt Italian aid to the Chetniks if they did not end. He requested that "Trifunović be apprised that if the Chetnik violence against the Croatian and Muslim population is not immediately stopped, we will stop supplying food and daily wages to those formations whose members are perpetrators of the violence. If this criminal situation continues, more severe measures will be undertaken". The massacre angered the NDH government and the Italians had to order the Chetniks to withdraw from Prozor. Some were discharged altogether while others were later sent to northern Dalmatia to aid Đujić's forces. Operation Beta later followed in the same month in which the Italians and NDH forces captured Livno and surrounding localities. A month after the massacre, Jevđević and Baćović wrote a self-critical report on Prozor to Mihailović, hoping to distance themselves from the actions of their troops.

In late September or early October 1942, Baćović and Jevđević held talks with Muslim leader Ismet Popovac and agreed to recruit Muslims into the Chetnik ranks. Popovac's Muslim Chetnik militia later fought the Partisans during the Axis-led Case White offensive in early 1943, but did not distinguish itself. By December 1943, an estimated 4,000 (or eight percent) of Mihailović's Chetniks were Muslim.

In October 1942, Baćović issued an appeal to Serb Partisans which blamed the establishment of the Partisan movement on Jews and "the scum of the earth". He blamed the Partisans for the destruction of traditional Serb society, religion and morals, claiming that they were corrupting women and the young, and promoting incest and immorality. He further implored Serb Partisans to accept that they were being led by "Jews, Muslims, Croats, Magyars, Bulgarians". In the same month, his staff issued a further appeal, claiming that the Serb Chetniks controlled all of Serbia, Montenegro, Sandžak, Herzegovina and most of Bosnia, and that Serb Partisans were to be found only in a few places in Bosnia. He urged Serb Partisans to defect to the Chetniks so that they could return to being "good Serbs" and contribute to the creation of a "free and Great Serb state". Baćović's Chetniks committed further atrocities against Croats and Muslims in Mostar and Konjic in November.

=== Operations in northern Dalmatia and Lika ===
In November and December 1942, the Italians helped about 4,000 of Baćović's Chetniks in Herzegovina relocate to northern Dalmatia and Lika with another 4,000 to be relocated later. In December, concerned about the possibility of Allied forces landing in the Balkans, the Germans began planning an anti-Partisan offensive in Bosnia and Herzegovina codenamed Case White. The size of the planned offensive required the involvement of both the Croatian Home Guard and the Italians. Late in the planning, the Italians began to prepare and equip Chetnik detachments, including Baćović's, for involvement in the operation. On 8 January, Baćović was conferred the title of vojvoda by the ailing Trifunović-Birčanin, with the nom de guerre of "Kalinovički".

In late January 1943, Baćović's forces in northern Dalmatia committed a massacre of Croat civilians in the town of Vrlika, near Split. Following Trifunović-Birčanin's death in February 1943, Baćović, Jevđević, Đujić and Baćović's chief of staff Radovan Ivanišević vowed to continue his policy of closely collaborating with the Italians against the Partisans. On 10 February 1943, a proclamation signed by Baćović, Đujić, Ivanišević and Ilija Mihić was issued. It declared to the people of Bosnia, Lika and Dalmatia that the Chetniks had cleansed Serbia, Montenegro, and Herzegovina of the Partisans, and were about to do the same in their areas. The declaration denounced the Partisans as the "criminal band of Tito, Moše Pijade, Levi Vajnert, and other paid Jews". The declaration also called upon the Partisan rank and file to kill their political commissars and join the Chetniks, and claimed that hundreds of their comrades were surrendering to the Chetniks every day because they realised that they had been "betrayed and swindled by the Communist Jews".

By 28 February 1943, 2,807 of the 8,137 Chetniks operating in northern Dalmatia as part of the Italian Anti-Communist Volunteer Militia (MVAC) XVIIth Corps were under Baćović's command. In July 1943, Montenegrin Partisan leader Milovan Đilas contacted both Baćović and Ostojić to establish their willingness to work jointly against the Germans and Italians, given that a new Yugoslav government-in-exile was about to be established in London without Mihailović. Baćović and Ostojić reported this contact to Mihailović who threatened to exclude them from his Chetnik organization if they maintained contact with the Partisans.

=== Anti-Partisan actions in Herzegovina ===
In March and April 1943, Baćović's troops fought against the Partisans in Eastern Herzegovina. In a letter to Chetnik headquarters on March 28, Baćović noted that the Partisans treated Chetnik prisoners of war well and that they did not harm families of Chetnik members following the Partisan capture of Nevesinje. Three days later Baćović sent a report to Mihailović stating that Chetnik troops had executed 70 Partisan prisoners and that the houses of communists had been burnt down and their families imprisoned. On April 3, Baćović reported to Mihailović that he had burned down entire villages, had executed people every day, and that he was holding 170 prisoners.

=== Cairo, London and return to Yugoslavia ===
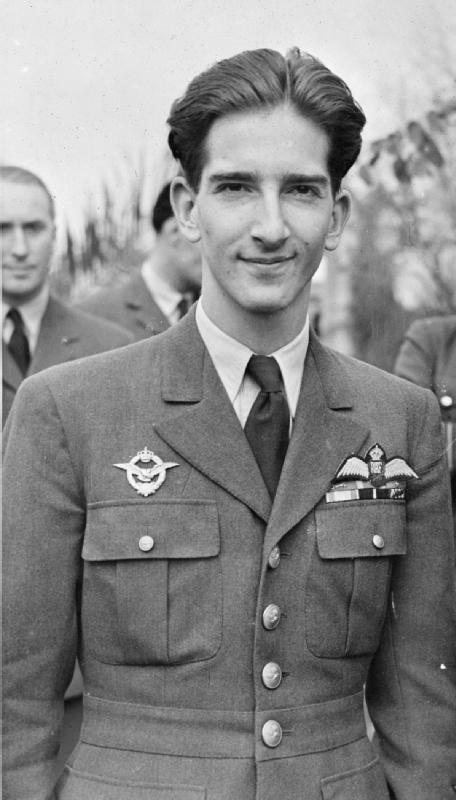
Baćović accompanied Major Vojislav Lukačević to the London wedding of King Peter II of Yugoslavia (pictured).

In mid-February 1944, Baćović and Lukačević accompanied Special Operations Executive (SOE) Colonel Bill Bailey to the coast south of Dubrovnik and were evacuated from Cavtat by a Royal Navy gunboat. They then travelled via Cairo to London, where Lukačević represented Mihailović at King Peter's wedding on 20 March 1944. After the British government decided to withdraw support from Mihailović, Baćović and Lukačević were not allowed to return to Yugoslavia until arrangements had been made for the British mission to Mihailović headed by Brigadier Charles Armstrong to be safely evacuated from occupied territory.

The two Chetniks were detained by the British in Bari, Italy, and thoroughly searched by local authorities, who suspected them of a robbery that had occurred from the Yugoslav consulate in Cairo. Most of the money, jewelry and uncensored letters that they were carrying were impounded. The two were flown out of Bari on 30 May, and landed on an airfield at Pranjani northwest of Čačak shortly after. Because their landing at Pranjani coincided with Armstrong's departure, Baćović and Lukačević demanded that Armstrong be held as a hostage until their impounded belongings could be returned from Bari. The Chetnik personnel at the airfield refused to keep Armstrong any further, and he was allowed to depart without incident.

Later that month, Baćović helped organize a Chetnik "Independent Group of National Resistance" and wanted to contact British forces who he expected to land on the southern Adriatic coast. On 11 September 1944, Baćović and Ostojić warned Chetnik headquarters that Muslims and Croats were joining the Partisans in large numbers and that Chetniks in Bosnia and Herzegovina lacked food and ammunition. They suggested that Mihailović request an Allied occupation of Yugoslavia or risk losing the war both politically and militarily. They assessed that the population had sensed that the Partisans were now supported by the three major Allied Powers, but that the Chetniks had now been abandoned by them. Baćović had always urged Mihailović to show restraint in his dealings with the Germans and Italians, and often warned Mihailović that he must never be seen openly cooperating with the occupiers. On 20 October 1944, Partisan and Soviet Red Army troops captured Belgrade from the Germans. Soon after the Chetniks lost the rest of the Serbian territory that had been the centre of their movement. After the breakdown of the Chetnik movement in early 1945, Baćović was no longer loyal to Mihailović.

=== Withdrawal and death ===
Baćović joined Đurišić's forces in their trek towards the Ljubljana Gap in modern-day Slovenia, alongside Chetnik ideologue Dragiša Vasić, detachments commanded by Ostojić, and a large number of refugees, totalling around 10,000. This force was formed into the Chetnik 8th Montenegrin Army, consisting of the 1st, 5th, 8th and 9th (Herzegovina) Divisions. Earlier, Đurišić and Mihailović had argued over the best course of action. Đurišić had wanted to withdraw through Albania to Greece, but Mihailović had told him to prepare for an Allied landing, the return of the king and the establishment of a national government. From the time Đurišić joined Mihailović in northeastern Bosnia, he was very critical of Mihailović's leadership and argued strongly for all remaining Chetnik troops to move to the Ljubljana Gap. When Mihailović remained unconvinced, Đurišić decided to move there independently of him, and arranged for Dimitrije Ljotić's Serbian Volunteer Corps already there to meet him near Bihać in western Bosnia to assist his movement.

In order to get his group to Bihać, Đurišić made a safe-conduct agreement with elements of the Armed Forces of the NDH and with the Montenegrin separatist Sekula Drljević who was collaborating with them. The details of the agreement are not known, but it appears that he and his troops were meant to cross the Sava River into Slavonia where they would be aligned with Drljević as the "Montenegrin National Army" with Đurišić retaining operational command. Đurišić apparently tried to outsmart them and sent only his sick and wounded across the river, keeping his fit troops south of the river. He began moving his command westwards and, harassed by both the NDH troops and Partisans, reached the Vrbas River. In the Battle of Lijevče Field, north of Banja Luka, the combined Chetnik force was defeated by a strong NDH force which was armed with German-supplied tanks.

Following this defeat and the defection of one of his sub-units to Drljević, Đurišić was induced to negotiate directly with the leaders of the NDH forces about the further movement of his group towards safety. However, this appears to have been a trap, as he was attacked and captured by them on his way to the meeting. According to Tomasevich, exactly what occurred after his capture is not clear, but Baćović, Đurišić, Vasić and Ostojić were subsequently killed, along with some Serbian Orthodox priests and others. According to some sources, on 20 April, Đurišić, Baćović, Vasić and Ostojić were taken to the Stara Gradiška prison, near Jasenovac. The Ustaše gathered them in a field alongside 5,000 other Chetnik prisoners and arranged for Drljević and his followers to select 150 Chetnik officers and non-combatant intellectuals for execution. Đurišić, Baćović, Vasić and Ostojić were amongst those selected. They and the others were loaded onto boats by the Ustaše and taken across the Sava River, never to be seen again. It is reported that they were killed either in the Jasenovac concentration camp itself, or in a marsh in its vicinity. Both the NDH forces and Drljević had reasons for ensnaring the Chetniks led by Đurišić. The NDH forces were motivated by the mass terror committed on the Muslim population in Sandžak and southeastern Bosnia while Drljević was opposed to Đurišić's support of a union of Serbia and Montenegro which ran counter to Drljević's separatism.
