= Ilija Trifunović-Birčanin =

Serbian Chetnik leader

vojvoda Ilija Trifunović-Birčanin
- Илија Трифуновић-Бирчанин
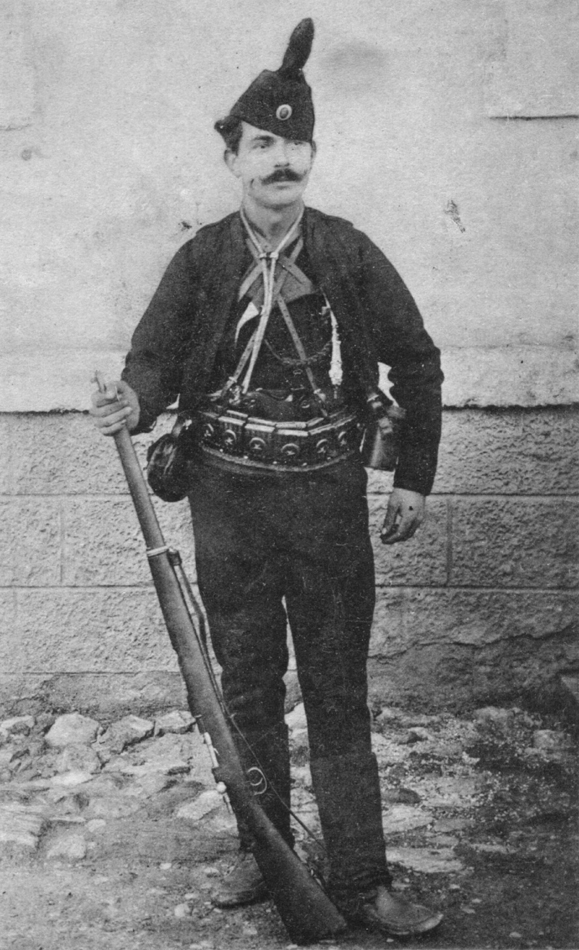
- In Chetnik gear, 1907
- Born: 1877; Topola, Principality of Serbia
- Died: 3 February 1943 (aged 64/65); Split, Kingdom of Italy
- Military career
- Allegiance: Chetniks (1906–43); Italy (1941–43)
- Service years: 1912–18; 1941–43
- Rank: vojvoda
- Commands: Chetnik movement in Dalmatia and the Independent State of Croatia, including Herzegovina and western Bosnia
- Conflicts: Balkan Wars; Serbian Campaign of World War I; World War II in Yugoslavia Operation Alfa

Ilija Trifunović-Birčanin (Serbian Cyrillic: Илија Трифуновић-Бирчанин; 1877 – 3 February 1943) was a Serbian Chetnik military commander (vojvoda, војвода). He took part in the Balkan Wars and World War I and afterwards served as the president of the Association of Serb Chetniks for Freedom and the Fatherland in the Kingdom of Yugoslavia. In the spring of 1942, he was appointed by Mihailović as the commander of Chetniks in Dalmatia, Herzegovina, western Bosnia and southwestern Croatia. He died in Split on 3 February 1943, having suffered from poor health for a considerable period of time.

== Early life ==
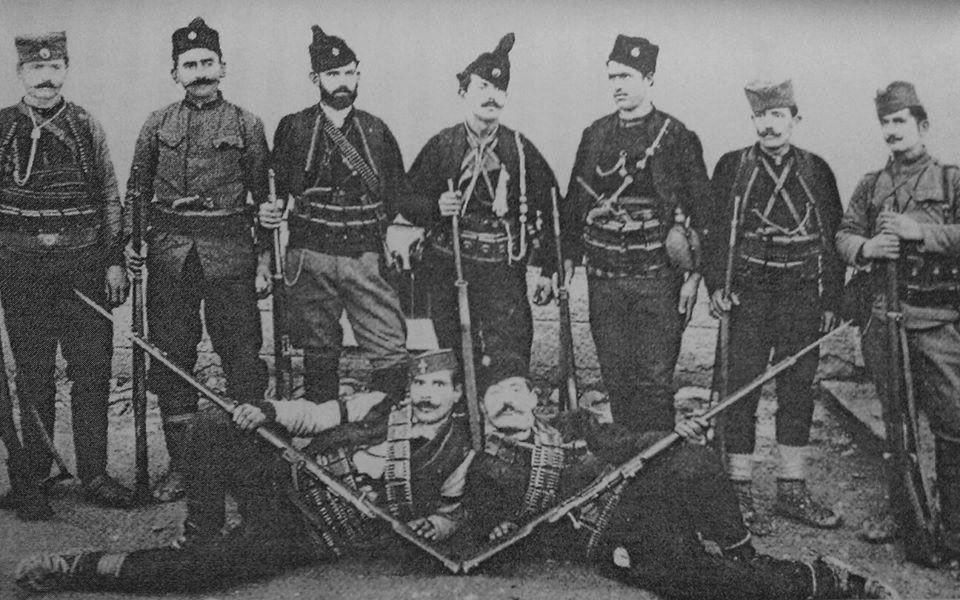
Birčanin and his band, 1907.

Ilija Trifunović-Birčanin was born in Topola, Principality of Serbia in 1877. He joined the Serbian Chetnik Organization active in Ottoman Macedonia (1903–1908) and adopted the nom de guerre of knez Ilija Birčanin (d. 1804). He served as a volunteer on the Serbian side in the Balkan Wars. He also fought with Serb forces during World War I, attaining the rank of Chetnik commander (Serbo-Croatian: vojvoda, војвода) and losing an arm in combat.

Following the war, Trifunović-Birčanin fought against Albanian forces in Kosovo. From 1929 to 1932, during a period in the Kingdom of Yugoslavia when other political parties were banned, he served as president of the Association of Serb Chetniks for Freedom and the Fatherland. After 1932, he served as chairman of the Narodna Odbrana (National Defence), a Serbian patriotic association composed mainly of World War I veterans. In 1934, he formed and became the leader of the Organization for Chetnik Veterans.

== Yugoslav coup d'etat ==
An organisation with considerable influence with the Serbian public, Narodna Odbrana petitioned Prince Paul on various occasions urging him to resist pressure from Adolf Hitler for Yugoslavia to join the Tripartite Pact. Trifunović-Birčanin was in close contact at this time with the British Special Operations Executive (SOE), which was actively attempting to prevent Yugoslavia from joining the Axis powers. SOE funded the Narodna Odbrana and established especially close ties to Trifunović-Birčanin. After discovering that Yugoslav Prime Minister Dragiša Cvetković and Foreign Minister Aleksander Cincar-Marković were travelling to Vienna on 24 March 1941 to sign a limited form of the Pact, the SOE opted to foment a coup d'etat. According to Williams, Trifunović-Birčanin was closely involved in its preparation and execution, informing the SOE that the coup was 99% certain to succeed and that preparations were making good progress. In contrast, Professor Jozo Tomasevich states that whilst Trifunović-Birčanin was probably informed of the coup, he was not among its organisers.

The coup by predominantly Serbian military officers led by the Head of the Air Force General Dušan Simović took place on 27 March, and Prince Paul was replaced by King Peter II. Within days, it became clear that Simović was not as anti-Axis as the SOE had hoped, and Trifunović-Birčanin and others began "discussing the possibility of a second coup".

== World War II ==
=== Move to Split and collaboration with Italians ===
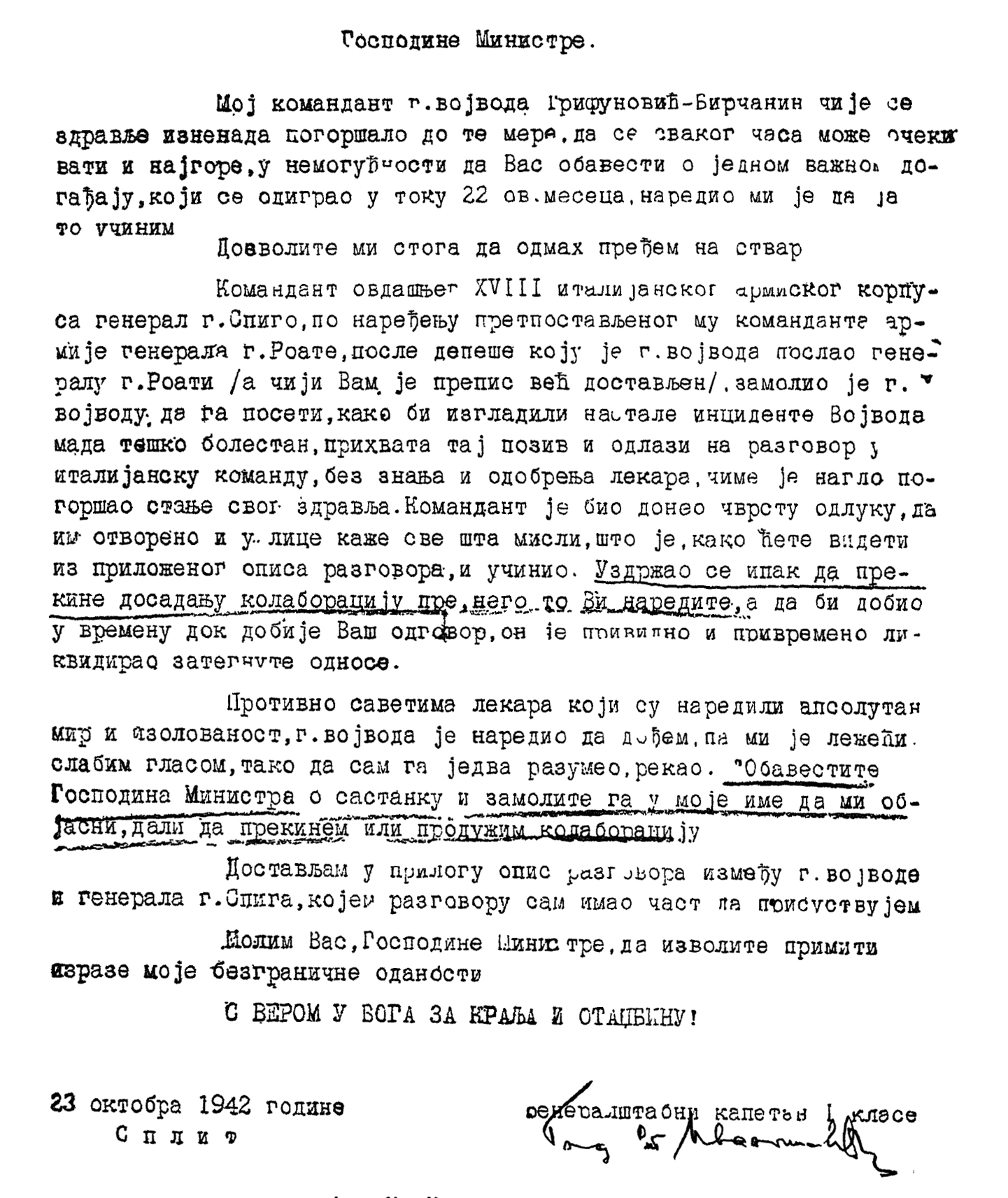
Report of Chetnik general staff officer Radovan Ivanišević from Split on Trifunović-Birčanin's cooperation with the Italians.

With the defeat of Yugoslavia, Trifunović-Birčanin fled to Kolašin in Montenegro before moving to the Italian-controlled city of Split in October 1941. The Chetnik movement was openly and deeply hostile to the nascent Yugoslav Partisans, and this led to Chetnik commanders negotiating a series of local co-operation agreements with Italian occupying forces, based on the strong mutual wish that the Partisan insurrection be extinguished. In essence, these agreements were that Italian and Chetnik forces would leave one another alone, and in return there would be an end to persecution of Serbs by the Italians. One such Chetnik-Italian agreement was concluded at a meeting in Split on 20 October 1941 by Trifunović-Birčanin, Dobroslav Jevđević, a leading Chetnik in the inter-war kingdom, and Angelo de Matteis, head of the information division of the Italian 6th Army Corps. Chetnik leader Draža Mihailović was aware of the collaborationist arrangements entered by Jevđević and Trifunović-Birčanin and condoned them. In addition to Jevđević, with whom he worked closely on liaison with the Italian forces, Trifunović-Birčanin's subordinate commanders included Momčilo Đujić (northern Dalmatia), Ilija Mihić and Slavko Bjelajac (Lika), and Petar Baćović (Herzegovina and southeastern Bosnia).

In early January 1942, Trifunović-Birčanin played a central role in organizing the units of Chetnik leaders in western Bosnia, Lika, and northern Dalmatia into the Dinara Division and dispatched former Royal Yugoslav Army officer to help. Đujić was to be the commander of the division and its goal was for the "establishment of a Serb national state" in which "an exclusively Orthodox population is to live." In the same month General Renzo Dalmazzo, Italian Sixth Army Corps commander organised a meeting in the hope that the Chetniks would take part in a joint operation against the Partisans. This was attended by Trifunović-Birčanin, Jevđević, Jezdimir Dangić and Stevo Rađenović, although "for the time being, however, the Germans vetoed any use of the Chetniks in such a capacity".

Based in Split, Trifunović-Birčanin was appointed by Mihailović to command Chetnik forces over Dalmatia, Herzegovina, western Bosnia and southwestern Croatia in the spring of 1942. According to historian Jozo Tomasevich, "both Chetnik and Italian documents clearly show that his role as liaison officer between the Chetniks and the Italian Second Army was just as important as his command over the Chetnik formations in those areas." On 23 June 1942, assisted by Trifunović-Birčanin, the Italians set up the first units of an Italian-controlled Anti-Communist Volunteer Militia known as MVAC (Italian: Milizia Volontaria Anti-Comunista), dedicated to "the annihilation of communism". In 1942 and 1943, 19,000–20,000 Chetniks, an overwhelming proportion of which were organised as Italian auxiliary forces in the MVAC in the Italian-occupied parts of the NDH, were equipped with arms, ammunition and clothing by the Italians. In 1942, the agreements with the Italians came under threat when they "threatened to cut off provisions and funding" after warning Jevđević and Trifunović-Birčanin that "their units were provoking disorder."

=== Operation Alfa ===
Beginning in September 1942, the Chetniks attempted to persuade the Italians into carrying out a "large operation" within their occupation zone. On 10 and 21 September, Trifunović-Birčanin met with Mario Roatta, commander of the Italian Second Army, and urged him to take action "as soon as possible" in a large operation against the Yugoslav Partisans in the Prozor-Livno area and offered aid in the form of 7,500 Chetniks on the condition that they be provided the necessary arms and supplies. In the meeting on 10 September, Trifunović-Birčanin told Roatta that he was not under the command of Mihailović, but that he had seen him on 21 July in Avtovac and had his approval in collaborating with the Italians. In late September or early October, Mihailović, responding to a letter from Trifunović-Birčanin dated 20 September, congratulated him on his conduct and "high comprehension of the national line" in these talks.

In early October, Operation Alfa was launched by the Italians and targeted Partisans northwest of the middle part of the Neretva. Between 3,000 and 5,500 Chetniks took part in the operation and were under the command of Baćović and Jevđević. The Chetniks, acting on their own, massacred over five hundred Catholics and Muslims and burnt numerous villages in the process of the operation. According to incomplete data, around 543 Catholic and Muslim civilians were massacred on the pretense that they had harbored and aided the Partisans.

Roatta objected to these "massive slaughters" of noncombatant civilians and threatened to halt Italian aid to the Chetniks if they did not end. He stated that "I request that Commander Trifunović be apprised that if the Chetnik violence against the Croatian and Muslim population is not immediately stopped, we will stop supplying food and daily wages to those formations whose members are perpetrators of the violence. If this criminal situation continues, more severe measures will be undertaken."

== Death ==
Having been in poor health for a considerable period, Trifunović-Birčanin died in Split on 3 February 1943. Following his death, Jevđević, along with Đujić, Baćović, and Radovan Ivanišević vowed to the Italians to carry on Trifunović-Birčanin's policies of closely collaborating with them against the Partisans.

== See also ==
- List of Chetnik voivodes
