= Dobroslav Jevđević =

Bosnian Serb politician and Chetnik commander

vojvoda Dobroslav Jevđević
- Доброслав Јевђевић
- Jevđević in uniform, wearing the Order of Karađorđe's Star
- Born: 28 December 1895; Miloševac near Prača, Condominium of Bosnia and Herzegovina, Austro-Hungarian monarchy
- Died: October 1962 (aged 66); Rome, Italy
- Military career
- Allegiance: Chetniks (1941–1945); Kingdom of Italy (1941–1943); Nazi Germany (1943–1945)
- Service years: 1941–1945
- Rank: vojvoda self-appointed)
- Commands: Chetnik movement in Herzegovina
- Conflicts: World War II in Yugoslavia: Operation Alfa; Operation Weiss
- Awards: Order of Karađorđe's Star

Dobroslav Jevđević (Serbian Cyrillic: Доброслав Јевђевић, pronounced [dǒbroslaʋ jêʋdʑevitɕ]; 28 December 1895 – October 1962) was a Bosnian Serb politician and self-appointed Chetnik commander (Serbo-Croatian Latin: vojvoda, војвода) in the Herzegovina region of the Axis-occupied Kingdom of Yugoslavia during World War II. He was a member of the interwar Chetnik Association and the Organisation of Yugoslav Nationalists, a Yugoslav National Party member of the National Assembly, and a leader of the opposition to King Alexander between 1929 and 1934. The following year, he became the propaganda chief for the Yugoslav government.

Following the Axis invasion of Yugoslavia in April 1941, he became a Chetnik leader in Herzegovina and joined the Chetnik movement of Draža Mihailović. Jevđević collaborated with the Italians and later the Germans in actions against the Yugoslav Partisans. Although Jevđević recognised the authority of Mihailović, who was aware of and approved of his collaboration with Axis forces, a number of factors effectively rendered him independent of Mihailović's command, except when he worked closely with Ilija Trifunović-Birčanin, Mihailović's designated commander in Dalmatia, Herzegovina, western Bosnia and southwestern Croatia.

During the joint Italian–Chetnik Operation Alfa, Jevđević's Chetniks, along with other Chetnik forces, were responsible for killing between 543 and 2,500 Bosnian Muslim and Croat civilians in the Prozor region in October 1942. They also participated in one of the largest Axis anti-Partisan operations of the war, Operation Weiss, in the winter of 1943. His Chetniks later merged with other collaborationist forces that had withdrawn towards the west, and were put under the command of SS-Obergruppenführer Odilo Globocnik of the Operational Zone of the Adriatic Littoral. Jevđević fled to Italy in the spring of 1945, where he was arrested by Allied military authorities and detained at a camp in Grottaglie. He was eventually set free, having received considerable Allied support. Yugoslavia's requests for extradition were ignored. Jevđević moved to Rome and lived under an assumed name. In the years following the war, he collected reports for various western intelligence services and printed anti-communist publications. He resided in Rome until his death in October 1962.

== Early life and political career ==
Dobroslav Jevđević was born on 28 December 1895 in the hamlet of Miloševac in Prača, near the town of Rogatica, in the Austro-Hungarian-occupied Bosnia Vilayet of the Ottoman Empire, to Dimitrije and Angela Jevđević (née Kosorić). Jevđević's father was a Serbian Orthodox priest, and the family was of Montenegrin Serb origin. Jevđević was raised in the Christian faith and attended secondary school in Sarajevo. There, he joined the revolutionary organisation known as Young Bosnia and became a friend of Gavrilo Princip, who killed Archduke Franz Ferdinand of Austria on 28 June 1914. The day of the assassination, Jevđević's father was arrested by the Austro-Hungarian police for his connections with the Serb revolutionary organisation Narodna Odbrana (National Defence). He was charged with high treason, sentenced to death by hanging in April 1916 and executed in Banja Luka.

Jevđević was a successful writer and poet in his youth. He studied law at the universities of Zagreb, Belgrade, and Vienna and spoke Serbian, Italian, German and French. Jevđević's political career began in 1918. During the interwar period, he was one of the most influential Serb politicians in Bosnia. He was a member of the Chetnik Association, an aggressively Serb-chauvinist political movement of over 500,000 members led by Kosta Pećanac. He was also one of the leaders of the Independent Democratic Party of Yugoslavia and headed the movement's military wing, the Organisation of Yugoslav Nationalists, which terrorised those Serbs in Bosnia, Herzegovina and Croatia who refused to join the party. Jevđević later became a parliamentary candidate of the opposition Yugoslav National Party in the Kingdom of Yugoslavia. He was elected to the Yugoslav Parliament a total of four times, representing the district of Rogatica then Novi Sad, and was an opposition leader during King Alexander's dictatorship of 1929–34. His tendency to cooperate with various Yugoslav political factions earned him the reputation of "being willing to sell himself to any political group in return for personal favours or advancement". In 1935, he was appointed as the Yugoslav government's propaganda chief by Prime Minister Bogoljub Jevtić. Jevđević approved of the creation of the Banovina of Croatia in 1939 and advocated a large Serb counterpart that would include most of Bosnia and Herzegovina. This advocacy drew him close to the various Chetnik associations that existed during the interwar period. In 1941, his cousin, Colonel Dušan Radović, left Yugoslavia and joined the Royal Air Force.

== World War II ==
Jevđević fled to Budva on the Montenegrin coast following the Axis invasion of Yugoslavia in April 1941. That month, the Germans and Italians created a puppet state known as the Independent State of Croatia (Croatian: Nezavisna Država Hrvatska; NDH), which implemented genocidal policies against Serbs, Jews and Romanis. The Serb population began to resist, and Jevđević became a prominent leader of the Chetnik uprising against NDH authorities in Bosnia and Herzegovina in 1941.

He was known for his pro-Italian sympathies prior to the war, and Chetnik leader Draža Mihailović jokingly described him as "an Italian who likes Serbs". Jevđević and pre-war Chetnik leader Ilija Trifunović-Birčanin sought to work with the Italians in the belief that an Italian occupation of both Bosnia and Herzegovina would limit the ability of the NDH to carry out its anti-Serb policies. Jevđević reportedly hoped that the Italians would allow the formation of a Serbian state of Bosnia and Herzegovina under their protection, but they were more interested in obtaining the practical assistance of his Chetniks in fighting the Partisans than helping him achieve his political aims. In the summer of 1941, Jevđević established links with the Italians, promoting Trifunović-Birčanin and himself as civilian intermediaries for the eastern Bosnian Chetniks of Jezdimir Dangić.

On 20 October 1941, Jevđević and Trifunović-Birčanin met and agreed to collaborate with the head of the information division of the Italian VI Corps. In late January 1942, Jevđević offered to assist the Italians if they occupied Bosnia, and to organise Chetnik detachments to work alongside Italian units in their fight against the communist-led Partisans. These contacts involved General Renzo Dalmazzo, commander of the Italian VI Corps, and Chetnik leaders Stevo Rađenović, Trifunović-Birčanin, Dangić and Jevđević. In February, Jevđević consulted with one of Dangić's supporters, Boško Todorović, who instructed him to negotiate with the new commander of the Italian Second Army, Mario Roatta, to arrange the withdrawal of NDH and German troops from eastern Bosnia, to be replaced by an exclusively Italian administration. Both Jevđević and Todorović impressed Dalmazzo with the influence they were able to exert over the eastern Bosnian Chetniks, but Todorović was killed by the Partisans in Herzegovina in late February. The influence Jevđević had was demonstrated when Serb nationalist armed groups in the Goražde and Foča districts swung over to an anti-Partisan and pro-Italian attitude when they were informed of Jevđević and Trifunović-Birčanin's ties with VI Corps headquarters. In March, the plans for Italian expansion into eastern Bosnia were discussed between Jevđević and NDH State Secretary Vjekoslav Vrančić. (Note: By April 1942, the Germans had become aware of these Italian-Chetnik plans and had arrested Dangić during a visit to the German-occupied territory of Serbia.)

Dalmazzo urged Roatta to expand Italian links with Serb nationalist groups into an alliance with them. At this time, the Italians were looking for allies to restore order, fight the Partisans, and support their political claims to NDH territory, and were under the impression that the various Serb nationalist groups were far better organised than they actually were. For example, Roatta was under the impression that Jevđević represented the Herzegovinian Chetniks, and that they were aligned with Dangić. In early March, Jevđević and Trifunović-Birčanin suddenly told the Italians that they were effectively in control of a Chetnik movement, and were ready to collaborate with the Italians on the latter's terms. Jevđević sent a message to Dalmazzo explaining that the Herzegovinian Chetniks wanted to avenge Todorović and were concentrating around Nevesinje ready to demonstrate their loyalty to the Italians. Despite their statements, Jevđević and Trifunović-Birčanin faced significant difficulties; the Serb nationalist groups had yet to demonstrate their military value to the Italians, and not all of the armed groups even acknowledged their leadership.

In the spring and summer of 1942, Jevđević and Trifunović-Birčanin regularly toured villages in the Goražde, Kalinovik and Foča districts, encouraging the local civilians and Chetnik detachments to behave loyally towards the Italians. The Italians were unable to gain German support for their plan to use Chetnik groups as auxiliaries during the joint Italian-German anti-Partisan Operation Trio in April–May. In May, Jevđević met with German intelligence officers in Dubrovnik and was asked whether he would cooperate in the pacification of Bosnia. Mihailović was aware of and condoned the collaborationist arrangements entered into by Jevđević and Trifunović-Birčanin. Jevđević and Trifunović-Birčanin frequently met with Chetnik commander Momčilo Đujić in Split, and the three men quarrelled over how to divide the financial assistance they were receiving from the Italians.

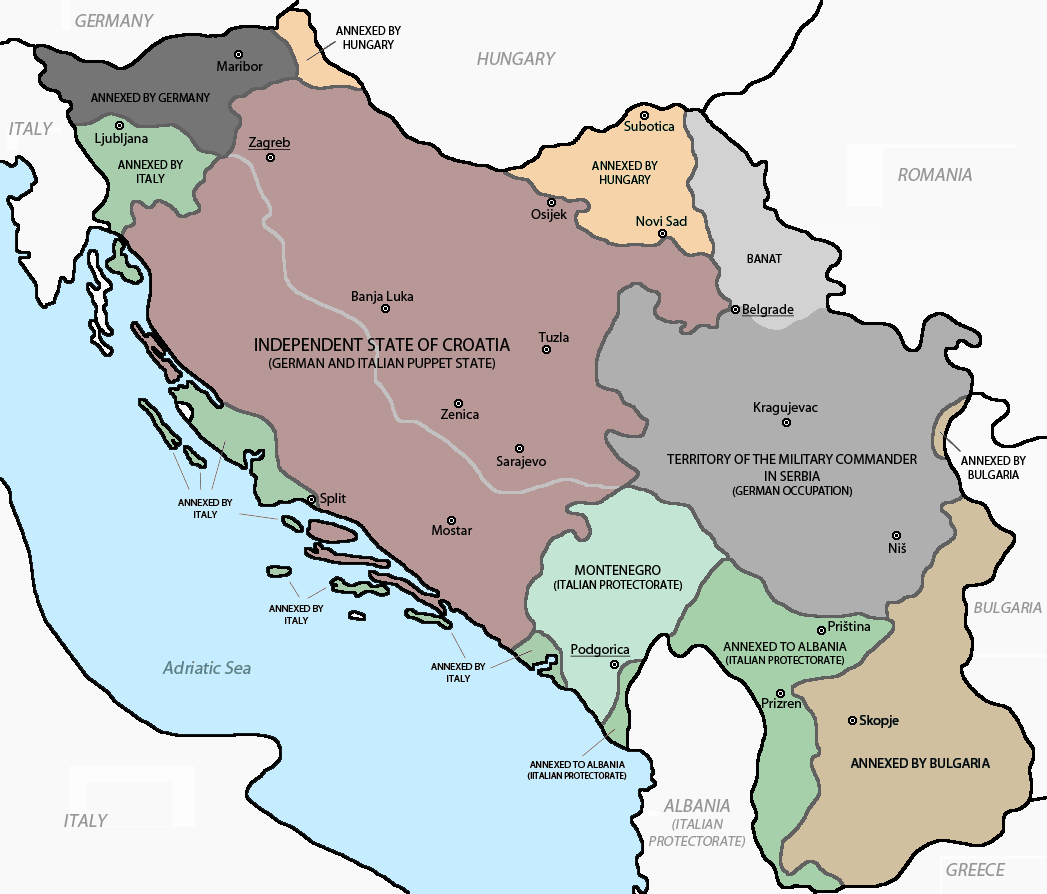
Map showing the Axis occupation of Yugoslavia from 1941–43, including the demarcation line between the German and Italian zones

In an internal Chetnik report of June 1942, Jevđević claimed that the Partisan proletarian brigades contained many "Jews, Gypsies and Muslims". In July 1942, he issued a proclamation to the "Serbs of eastern Bosnia and Herzegovina" claiming that:

Tito, the supreme military chief of the Partisans, is a Croat from Zagreb. Pijade, the supreme political chief of the Partisans, is a Jew. Four-fifths of all armed Partisans were supplied to them by Pavelić's Croatian Army. Two-thirds of their officers are former Croatian officers. The financing of their movement is carried out by the powerful Croatian capitalists of Zagreb, Split, Sarajevo and Dubrovnik. Fifty percent of the Ustaše responsible for the massacres of Serbs are now in their ranks.

Jevđević charged the Partisans with having "destroyed Serb churches and established mosques, synagogues and Catholic temples". In mid-1942, the Chetniks became aware that the Italians were planning to largely withdraw from significant parts of the NDH that they had been occupying in force up to that time. Jevđević and Trifunović-Birčanin told the Italians that in response to this, Mihailović was considering evacuating Serb civilians from Herzegovina to Montenegro and moving Montenegrin Chetniks north to meet the Ustaše, who were expected to unleash a new wave of violence on Serb civilians. Over 22–23 July 1942, Mihailović chaired a conference with Jevđević and Trifunović-Birčanin in Avtovac, Herzegovina. On the second day of the conference, Jevđević and Trifunović-Birčanin traveled to nearby Trebinje where they conferred with Herzegovinian Chetnik leaders Radmilo Grđić and Milan Šantić. The German consulate in Sarajevo reported that this meeting established the ultimate goals and immediate strategy of the Herzegovinian Chetniks as:

(1) the creation of Greater Serbia; (2) the destruction of the Partisans; (3) the removal of the Catholics and Muslims; (4) non-recognition of Croatia; (5) no collaboration with the Germans; and (6) temporary collaboration with the Italians for weapons, ammunition and food.

Under the auspices of the Italians, the Chetniks thoroughly ethnically cleansed eastern Herzegovina of its Croats and Muslims in July and August 1942. In response to a massacre of non-Serbs in Foča in August, Jevđević issued a proclamation to the Muslims in eastern Herzegovina demanding that they join the Chetniks in their struggle against the Ustaše. He stated: "I personally believe that in a future state the Muslims have no other choice but to finally and definitely accept Serb nationality and renounce their speculative maneuvering between the Serb and Croat nations, above all because all the lands in which the Muslims live will indisputably and inviolably become part of the Serb state entity." That month, Roatta contacted Jevđević and "legalised" 3,000 of his Chetniks, formally authorising them to operate in eastern Herzegovina.

In the autumn of 1942, Jevđević took a radically different approach than other Chetnik leaders and spoke in favour of collaborating with the Muslims to form Muslim Chetnik units in the fight against the Ustaše and the Partisans. He favoured such tolerance in areas where the Muslims were protected by the Germans, and considered it a tactical necessity while stressing that "there can be no true unity with them". In late September or early October 1942, Jevđević and Chetnik commander Petar Baćović held talks with Muslim leader Ismet Popovac and agreed to form a Muslim Chetnik organisation. Jevđević then urged the Italian military to occupy all of Bosnia and Herzegovina in order to end Ustaše rule and claimed the support of 80 percent of the population, consisting of Serbs and Muslims. At the same time, he requested that the Germans grant autonomy to Bosnia and Herzegovina until the end of the war, citing that the Muslims were "tested friends of the Germans both in the earlier and in the present era". Although Jevđević attempted to recruit Muslims while making use of the Bosnian desire for autonomy to support his alliance with the occupying Axis powers, nothing developed from these requests.

=== Operation Alfa ===
Towards the end of August 1942, Mihailović issued directives to Chetnik units, including those operating in the NDH such as Jevđević's forces, ordering them to prepare for a large scale anti-Partisan operation alongside Italian and NDH troops. In September 1942, aware that they were unable to defeat the Partisans alone, the Chetniks tried to persuade the Italians to undertake a large operation against the Partisans in western Bosnia. Trifunović-Birčanin met with Roatta on 10 and 21 September and urged him to undertake this operation as soon as possible to clear the Partisans from the Prozor–Livno area and offered 7,500 Chetniks as aid on the condition they be given the necessary arms and supplies. He was successful in obtaining some arms and promises of action. The proposed operation, faced with opposition from Pavelić and a cautious Italian high command, was nearly cancelled, but after Jevđević and Trifunović-Birčanin promised to cooperate with Croat and Muslim anti-Partisan units, it went ahead, with less Chetnik involvement. Also in September, Jevđević offered the Germans a Bosnian Chetnik force of 12,000 men to protect the railway line between Sarajevo and Višegrad, but his overtures were rejected by the German plenipotentiary general to the NDH, Generalmajor Edmund Glaise-Horstenau.

In early October 1942, Jevđević and Baćović, with 3,000 Chetniks from Herzegovina and southeast Bosnia, participated in the Italian-led Operation Alfa. This involved a two-pronged thrust towards the town of Prozor. German and NDH troops drove from the north, and Italian and Chetnik forces pushed from the Neretva River. Prozor and some smaller towns were captured by the combined Italian–Chetnik force. Individual Chetnik bands, acting on their own, proceeded to burn a number of Muslim and Catholic villages, and killed between 543 and 2,500 non-Serbs in the Prozor area. Their behaviour angered the NDH government and the Italians had to order the Chetniks to withdraw. Some were discharged altogether while others were sent to northern Dalmatia to aid Đujić's forces. A month after the massacre, Jevđević and Baćović wrote a self-critical report on Prozor to Mihailović, hoping to distance themselves from the actions of the troops.

=== Operation Weiss ===
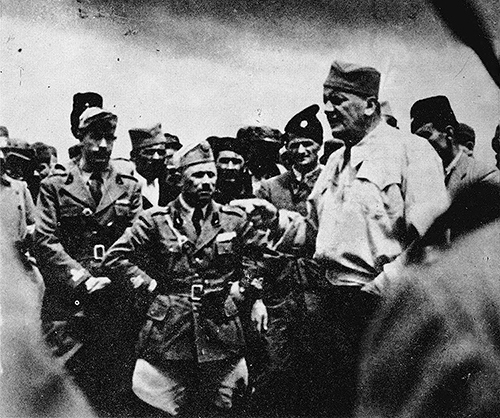
Jevđević conferring with Italian officers in February 1943

In a meeting with Roatta in November 1942, Jevđević obtained Italian agreement to "legalise" another 3,000 Chetniks and recognition of almost all of eastern Herzegovina as a "Chetnik zone". In return, the Chetniks had to promise not to attack Muslim and Croat civilians and agreed to having an Italian liaison officer embedded in all their formations of regiment strength or more. On 15 November 1942, Jevđević agreed to support the Italian decision to start arming Muslim anti-Partisan groups. This support almost cost him his life when several Chetniks, who strongly opposed the arming of Croat and Muslim anti-Partisan groups by the Italians, visited Mostar with the intention of assassinating him.

By the end of 1942, Chetnik–Italian collaboration was routine. Chetnik forces were included in the Italian planning for Operation Weiss, a major Axis anti-Partisan offensive which was to be launched on 20 January 1943. On 3 January, Jevđević participated in an Axis planning conference for Operation Weiss in Rome, along with senior German, Italian and NDH commanders. The plans included the 12,000 Chetniks under Jevđević's command, and on 23 February 1943 he concluded an agreement with the Germans that they would not cross the Neretva River and that contact between German and Chetnik troops would be avoided. Early in the operation, Jevđević concluded an agreement for cooperation with the commander of NDH troops in Mostar. Later in the operation Jevđević requested, through the Italians, the assistance of the 7th SS Volunteer Mountain Division Prinz Eugen in defending Nevesinje, which faced severe pressure from Partisan forces that had broken through the Chetnik lines at the Battle of the Neretva River. Although the Italians also made this request themselves, the Germans declined, stating that the division was reserved for other tasks.

After the death of Trifunović-Birčanin in February 1943, Jevđević, along with Đujić, Baćović, and Radovan Ivanišević, vowed to the Italians to carry on Trifunović-Birčanin's policies of closely collaborating with them against the Partisans. The Italians were able to exert pressure on Jevđević, as his brother and fiancée were interned in Italy. Mihailović apparently felt that Jevđević had exceeded his authority by attending the planning conference in Rome, and indeed, when the Yugoslav government-in-exile awarded Jevđević the Order of Karađorđe's Star in early 1943 for his services to the Serb population during the Ustaše massacres of 1941, Mihailović suppressed the announcement of the award because of the nature of Jevđević's agreement with the Italians, although the reason may also have been because he was aware of Chetnik revenge killings of Herzegovinian Catholics and Muslims in response to atrocities committed by the Ustaše in Croatia. Tensions between Mihailović and Jevđević became so apparent that Mihailović reportedly threatened to "string [him] up from the nearest tree". In March, Jevđević publicly demanded an end to the Chetnik killing of Croats in Herzegovina. In May, Benito Mussolini finally gave in to German pressure and ordered Italian troops to co-operate in the disarming of Chetnik groups. Jevđević was immediately placed under house arrest.

His house arrest did not last long, as in the following month, Mihailović sent Jevđević to Slovenia to report on the state of Chetnik forces there. Jevđević began developing contacts with the Germans prior to the Italian capitulation in September 1943. On 3 September, he travelled to Rome via Rijeka and made contact with German intelligence services. This marked the beginning of his collaboration with the Germans. Following the German occupation of NDH territory that had previously been held by the Italians, Jevđević moved to Trieste and stayed at the Hotel Continental. There, he helped organise displaced Chetniks and arranged for them to be returned to the town of Opatija. He stayed in Trieste until January 1944, when he relocated to Opatija with Chetniks from Trieste who had been placed under his command. He then moved his Chetniks to Ilirska Bistrica, and collaborated with the Germans until the end of the war. On 3 November 1944, he met with German representatives, where it was agreed that his Chetniks would retreat alongside the Germans in the event of a Partisan victory, and fight alongside them in and around Sarajevo in the event of Yugoslavia's restoration as an independent state under Allied auspices.

=== Withdrawal ===
In December 1944, Jevđević's 3,000 remaining fighters joined Đujić's Chetniks, Dimitrije Ljotić's Serbian Volunteer Corps, and the remnants of Milan Nedić's Serbian Shock Corps, which were under the command of SS-Obergruppenführer und General der Waffen-SS (SS General) Odilo Globocnik, the Higher SS and Police Leader of the Adriatic Littoral. Despite this, they attempted to contact the western Allies in Italy in an effort to secure foreign aid for a proposed anti-communist offensive to restore royalist Yugoslavia. They were all blessed by Serbian Orthodox bishop Nikolaj Velimirović upon his arrival in Slovenia. On 11 April 1945, a detachment of Jevđević's Chetniks, along with three regiments of the Serbian Volunteer Corps, marched into south-western Croatia with the aim of linking up with the Montenegrin Volunteer Corps of Pavle Đurišić, which was marching across Bosnia in an attempt to reach Slovenia. The relief effort came too late, because the Montenegrin Volunteer Corps had already been defeated by NDH forces at the Battle of Lijevče Field near Banja Luka, after which Đurišić was captured and killed. The relief force then marched north to Slovenia, where it fought the Partisans before retreating into Austria. These Chetniks were subsequently captured by the Allies and repatriated to Yugoslavia, where they were summarily executed by the Partisans in the Bleiburg repatriations. Jevđević remained highly influential among the Chetniks until the end of the war.

== Exile and death ==
=== Release from captivity ===
In the spring of 1945, Jevđević fled to Italy, where he was arrested by Allied forces and detained at a camp in Grottaglie. An estimated 10,000 Chetniks reportedly followed him and Đujić into the country. Jevđević was interned in Grottaglie for some time along with others, including the former Ustaše commissioner for Banja Luka, Viktor Gutić. During this time, an indictment was issued against him in Sarajevo. It charged that under his command in "the first half of October 1942 in and around Prozor [the Italians and Chetniks] butchered and killed 1,716 persons of both sexes, of the Croatian and Muslim nations, and plundered and burnt about 500 households". Jevđević received considerable Allied support in Italy despite being wanted by British authorities in connection with these allegations. On paper, the Chetniks in Italy were listed as "surrendered enemy personnel", but were largely viewed with sympathy by the Allies, who considered them anti-German. Hence, many Chetnik prisoners were handed British Army uniforms and given non-combatant duties throughout Italy, such as guarding munitions and supplies. In August 1945, Jevđević became the commander of a camp for disarmed Chetniks in Cesena. He was eventually set free and Yugoslavia's requests for extradition were ignored.

=== Intelligence-gathering activities ===
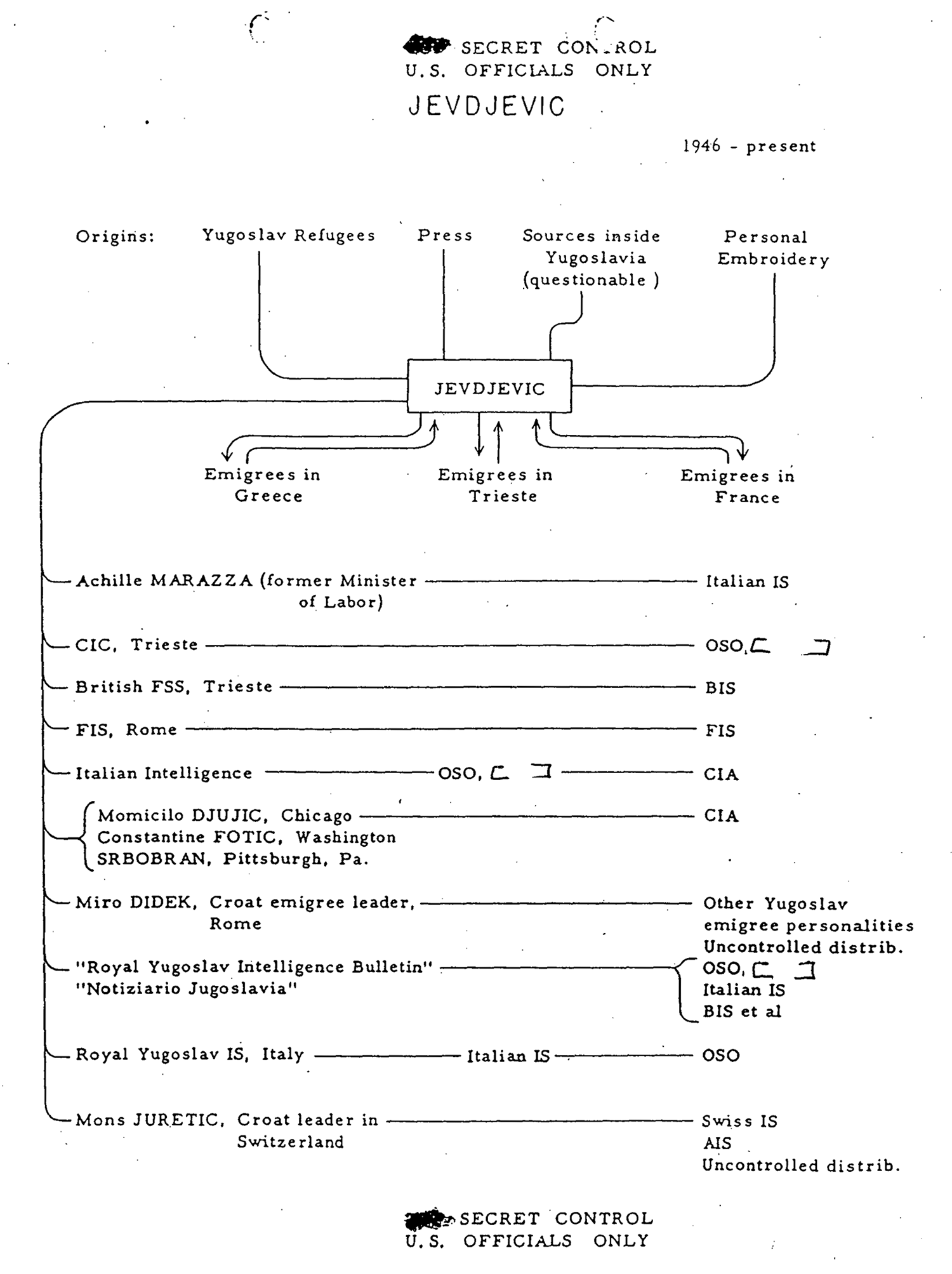
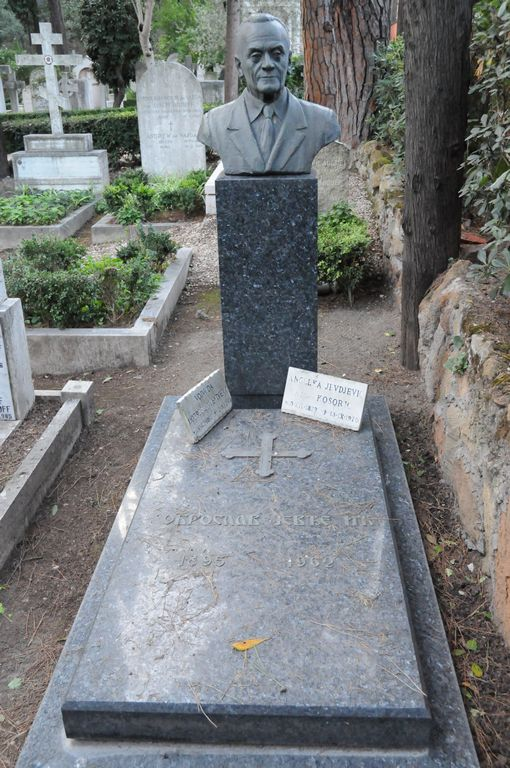
A Central Intelligence Agency chart illustrating the flow of the information generated by Jevđević (left) and his grave at the Non-Catholic Cemetery in Rome (right)

According to the Central Intelligence Agency (CIA), Jevđević lived in Rome under the aliases "Giovanni St. Angelo" and "Enrico Serrao". He spent most of his time and money quarrelling with émigré Yugoslav politicians, trying to prove that his collaboration with the Italians was necessary in order to protect the population of Bosnia and Herzegovina from the Partisans and Germans. He became a member of the Association of Free Journalists of Central-Eastern Europe, and served as an informant for the Italian intelligence services between 1946 and 1947. During this period, he published a confidential periodical called the Royal Yugoslav Intelligence Bulletin which he shared with the Italians. Jevđević also contributed to a number of newspapers, including the Serb nationalist Srbobran. In 1946, he helped form the Serbian National Committee in Rome and, with help from Achille Marazza, published a pan-Serb and anti-Croat newspaper, Srpske Novine, in Eboli. He also established contacts with Italian neo-fascist groups and with an anti-communist group called the Committee of Nations Oppressed by Russia.

Disagreement over who would lead the 10,000 Chetnik exiles in Italy escalated into a feud between Jevđević, Đujić and General Miodrag Damjanović in mid-1947. Damjanović had been appointed by Mihailović in March 1945 to lead the Chetniks into northwestern Italy. Jevđević and Đujić refused to accept this and claimed that they were Mihailović's only successors as leaders of the Chetnik movement.

By 1949, the CIA claimed that Jevđević's intelligence material was being used by the Italian Ministry of Interior, the United States Counterintelligence Corps, British Forensic Science Service in Trieste, and French intelligence services in Rome and Paris. His intelligence correspondents included Đujić, who disseminated his intelligence reports to the CIA, Konstantin Fotić, the former Yugoslav ambassador to the United States, and Miro Didek, Croat politician Vladko Maček's self-styled intelligence representative in Rome. The intelligence reports were mostly collected from refugees fleeing Yugoslavia and arriving in Italy via Trieste and from émigré groups in Italy and Greece. By 1949, Jevđević claimed to have formed a large network of anti-communist propagandists in Italy and intelligence collection centres in Albania, Bulgaria and Greece. The CIA believed that these claims were exaggerated, if not entirely fictitious. In 1951, Jevđević began printing an anti-communist, pro-Chetnik publication from an unidentified religious institution in Italy. Issues were regularly mailed to Yugoslav exiles and former Chetniks living in the United States, Canada, Australia and various European countries.

In May and June 1952, Jevđević visited Canada and addressed the Congress of the Serbian National Defence (Srpska Narodna Odbrana) in Niagara Falls regarding developments within Italy's Serb émigré community. The following year, he and Đujić issued a proclamation in Chicago declaring their intention to organise Chetnik groups against Damjanović, who had since emigrated to Germany. Jevđević later received threatening letters warning him not to go through with such a plan for fear of disuniting the Yugoslav diaspora. Little is known of his activities after 1953. He continued to live in Rome until his death in October 1962. He is interred at the Non-Catholic Cemetery in Rome.
