= Mario Roatta =

Italian general (1887–1968)

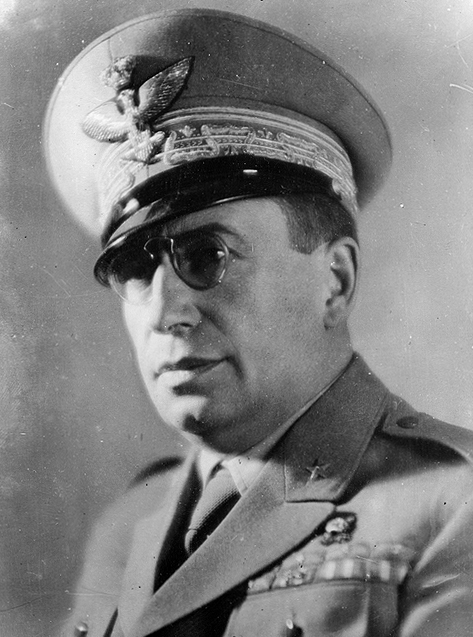

Chief of Staff of the Royal Italian Army
- In office 1 June 1943 – 18 November 1943
- Preceded by: Giuseppe De Stefanis
- Succeeded by: Paolo Berardi
- In office 24 March 1941 – 20 January 1942
- Preceded by: Rodolfo Graziani
- Succeeded by: Vittorio Ambrosio

Personal details
- Born: 2 February 1887 Modena, Kingdom of Italy
- Died: 7 January 1968 (aged 80) Rome, Italy
- Spouse: Ines Mancini
- Children: 1
- Nickname: Black Beast

Military service
- Allegiance: Kingdom of Italy
- Branch/service: Royal Italian Army
- Years of service: 1906–1943
- Rank: General
- Commands: Corpo Truppe Volontarie; Flechas Division; Italian Second Army
- Battles/wars: World War I; Spanish Civil War Battle of Málaga Battle of Guadalajara; World War II in Yugoslavia Invasion of Yugoslavia Case White

Mario Roatta (2 February 1887 – 7 January 1968) was an Italian general. After serving in World War I he rose to command the Corpo Truppe Volontarie which assisted Francisco Franco's nationalist forces during the Spanish Civil War. He was the deputy chief of staff of the Italian Army from October 1939 to March 1941 and from March 1941 to January 1942 its chief of staff and helped in preparing for the invasion of Yugoslavia. Roatta would gain the nickname "Black Beast of Yugoslavia” due to his brutal methods of repression.

He is best known for his role as the commander of the Italian Second Army in its repression against civilians, in the Slovene- and Croatian-inhabited areas of Italian-occupied and annexed Yugoslavia during World War II. He constructed a policy in which he attempted to eliminate the Yugoslav Partisans, helped manage relations with the authorities of the puppet Independent State of Croatia, and "greatly advanced and systematized" collaboration with the Chetniks. As a "manifesto for repression in the Yugoslav territories", Roatta issued Circular 3C which urged "ethnic clearance" be carried out and stressed the need for "complete cleansing" of Slovene-inhabited areas. In line with Circular 3C's objectives Roatta ordered summary executions, hostage taking, reprisals, internments, burning of houses and whole villages, and the deportation of 25,000 people, who were placed in Italian concentration camps at Rab, Gonars, Monigo (Treviso), Renicci d'Anghiari, Chiesanuova and elsewhere. The survivors received no compensation from the Italian state after the war. The deportees had formed about 7.5 percent of the total population of the Italian-annexed Province of Ljubljana.

== Early life ==
Mario Roatta was born 2 February 1887 in Modena, Kingdom of Italy to Marie Antoinette Richard, a French native of Savoy and Giovan Battista Roatta, who was a native of the province of Cuneo. His father was a captain in the Royal Italian Army.

== Early military career ==
In 1904, he entered a military school in Modena. When he was nineteen Roatta became an active soldier in the army and was promoted in 1906 to the rank of second lieutenant in the 26th infantry regiment stationed in Turin. Three years later he was promoted to lieutenant. He was appointed a captain in August 1914 and assigned to the Army Staff Corps. During World War I he saw service on the Italian, Albanian and French fronts, serving for a period as chief of staff of a division of the II Corps. In January 1917 he was promoted to major and then to lieutenant colonel, in October of the same year.

== Interwar years ==
Following the end of the war he remained in the military and sent to Berlin in February 1919 to serve as the chief of staff of the Italian military mission in charge of the repatriation of Russian prisoners of war. He was then sent in August of that same year to serve in the military section of the Italian delegation to the Paris Peace Conference.

Following the end of the conference, he served in the early 1920s as an instructor of the central infantry school in Civitavecchia. From February 1926 to December 1930, he served as the military attaché at the Italian Embassy in Warsaw. During this period he was promoted to colonel in December 1926. Following his return from Warsaw in February 1928, he was appointed aide-de-camp to King Vittorio Emanuele III. In May 1929 he was appointed to the position of military attaché at the Italian Embassy in Helsinki. Following his return to Italy, he was in command of the 84th infantry regiment from December 1930 until in June 1933, when he was made the chief of staff of the Army Corps in Bari and afterwards the Chief of Intelligence of the General Staff.

From 1934 to 1936, Roatta headed the Italian Military Intelligence Service (Italian: Servizio Informazioni Militari, SIM).

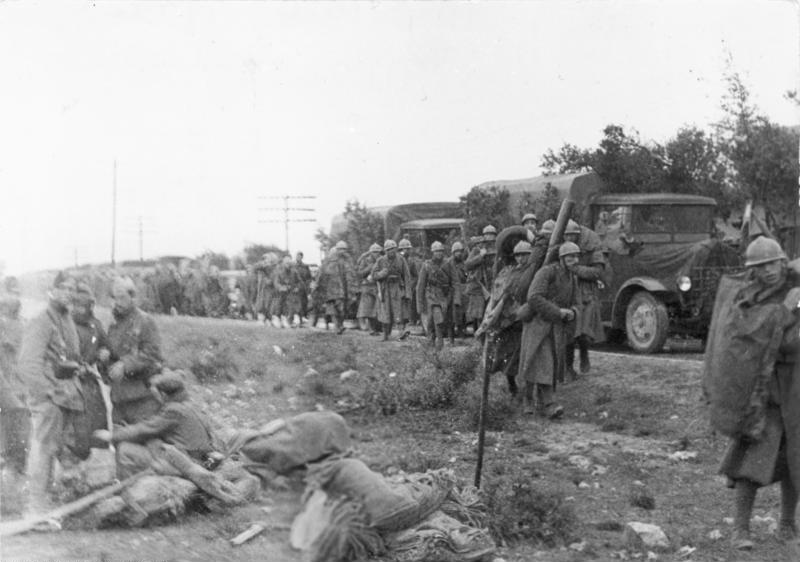
CTV at the Battle of Guadalajara.

From September 1936 to December 1938, he took part in the Spanish Civil War. He initially aided Galeazzo Ciano by helping direct "Italian assistance to the Nationalists on a day-to-day basis". In 1936 Ciano successfully persuaded Mussolini that Roatta be given command of the Corps of Volunteer Troops (Corpo Truppe Volontarie, CTV). In early March 1937, Roatta and his entire CTV were deployed to central Spain for the Battle of Guadalajara (Operation Folgore) with the intent of capturing Madrid and causing the collapse of the Second Spanish Republic. Roatta was later replaced by Ettore Bastico as commander.

From July to October 1939, he served as a military attaché in Berlin.

== World War II ==
From October 1939 to March 1941, he served as the Deputy Chief of Staff of the Italian Army.

In September 1940, the Italians set forth the first crucial steps necessary for the invasion of Yugoslavia. Roatta reported that "all available forces in northern Italy gathered at the Yugoslav frontier between Tarvisio and Fiume: two armies on the front line, and a third in reserve. Altogether there were thirty-seven divisions, eighty-five groups of medium-caliber artillery, and all the special formations, with corresponding services and supplies."

=== Policy Directive and the Circular 3C ===
In January 1942, Roatta had become the commander of the Italian Second Army, succeeding General Vittorio Ambrosio.

Between 30 January and 9 February 1942, Roatta discussed with Ambrosio to create a Policy Directive (Linea di condotta) on his command's relationship with the Croats, Chetniks, and Partisans. Roatta was mostly concerned with removing a large number of Italian forces present in Zones II and III and reorganizing those left into strong garrisons to lower troop casualties. In a response sent on 13 February, Ambrosio stated that there should be maximum loyalty to the Croats, but with a "no uncertainty, or weakness, and a strong hand, if necessary." He vowed a "struggle to the bitter end" with regards to the Partisans. Through these talks the relationship with the Independent State of Croatia and the Partisans was well defined. Under Mario Roatta's command, Italy's violence against the Slovene civil population matched the Germans. Executions, hostage-taking and killing, reprisals, internments into the Rab and Gonars concentration camps, and the burning of houses and villages were ordered. According to historians James Walston and Carlo Spartaco Capogeco, the annual mortality rate in the Rab concentration camp was higher than the average mortality rate in Nazi concentration camp Buchenwald (which was 15%), at least 18 percent. Monsignor Joze Srebnic, Bishop of Veglia (Krk island), reported to Pope Pius XII that "witnesses, who took part in the burials, state unequivocally that the number of the dead totals at least 3,500".

With the Chetniks, however, Roatta was free to create his own policy and collaboration between the two was "greatly advanced and systematized" under his supervision and carried out by all Italian commanders in the Italian annexed or occupied areas of Yugoslavia.

On 1 March 1942, Roatta issued the Circular 3C which was distributed to ranks up to battalion command in areas occupied and annexed by the Italians. It was a "manifesto for repression in the Yugoslav territories" that urged mass internment and a scorched earth strategy in order for "de-Balkanization" and "ethnic clearance". There was no resistance from the High Command of the Second Army for the "evacuation of entire regions." In "abnormal" (areas where military action was taking place) occupied districts, Roatta demanded that all families that, without good reason, lacked their able-bodied male members between the ages of sixteen and sixty years, be interned and deported. He justified this mass internment with the intense danger that the rebels posed. Suspicious groups were to be identified, taken as hostage, and kept in custody. When attacks were carried out against the Italians and perpetrators weren't identified within forty-eight hours the hostage were to be executed. Residents near railway lines, roads, telephone lines, and military depots were to be implicated in sabotage acts and if information that led to an arrest within forty-eight hours was not provided, they would be interned, their cattle confiscated, and their houses destroyed. Roatta also declared that all males, able-bodied or wounded, near rebel groups were to be regarded as insurgents if they wore military uniforms, had band badges, or carried military equipment.

In addition there were "ten commandments" stipulating that:

1. The army is fighting a war.
2. The information service must be particularly active and extensive.
3. Secrecy must be maintained at all costs.
4. Garrisons large and small must be organized for defence.
5. The efficiency of the rebels is often overestimated.
6. You must react promptly against enemy offensives, using as much massive force as possible.
7. Operations against the rebels are real and proper acts of war.
8. Being caught off-guard is unacceptable.
9. You must tenaciously fight to the bitter end.
10. The situation and prestige of Italy in the new provinces, and in the occupied territories, require iron discipline from the entire army and exemplary demeanour in every respect.

On 6 March 1942, in a report to the General Staff of the Army, he created a policy towards the Chetniks with four points:

To support the Chetniks sufficiently to make them fight against the communists, but not so much as to allow them too much latitude in their own action; to demand and assure that the Chetniks do not fight against the Croatian forces and authorities; to allow them to fight against the communists on their own initiative (so that they can "slaughter each other"); and finally to allow them to fight in parallel with the Italian and German forces, as do the nationalist bands [Chetniks and separatists] in Montenegro.

Roatta later explained his policy in more detail in his postwar memoirs:

The political label of the "Chetniks," their indirect relations with the "Allies," and their program for the future did not interest this commander, and these things he "ignored." He only established and exploited the existing fact, that in the territory under his command the "Chetniks" acted in our favor. So much the worse for the Croats and the Germans in other regions who did not want to or did not know how to make out of the "Chetniks" their own allies. Thus, despite the protests of Berlin and Zagreb, and the efforts of the government in Rome (which often changed its opinion and finally adopted the German view), we continued on our part to collaborate with the "Chetniks." The formations in question were furnished arms, etc., and so regularized (as were the other voluntary formations) until they reached a total strength of about 30,000 men.

On 23 May 1942, Roatta met with Mussolini who told him that "the best situation is when the enemy is dead. So we must take numerous hostages and shoot them whenever necessary." To implement this in Province of Ljubljana, Roatta suggested the closure of the Province of Fiume and Croatia, the evacuation of people in the east of the former frontiers to a distance of three to four kilometers inland, the organization of border patrols to kill anyone attempting to cross, the mass internment of "twenty to thirty thousand persons" to Italian concentration camps, burning down houses, and the confiscation of property from villagers suspected of having contact with Slovene Partisans for families of Italian soldiers. He also mentioned the need to extend the plan to Dalmatia and for the construction of concentration camps. Roatta insisted, "If necessary don't shy away from using cruelty. It must be a complete cleansing. We need to intern all the inhabitants and put Italian families in their place."

=== Italian withdrawal and Chetnik collaboration ===
On 19 June 1942, an Italian-Croatian agreement was formalized in Zagreb regarding the withdrawal of around half the Italian forces present in Zones II and III, leaving the Croatian government to maintain the Chetnik militias established there by the Italians – provided that the Chetniks recognized the sovereignty of the Independent State of Croatia.

Since September 1942, the Chetniks attempted to persuade the Italians into carrying out a "large operation" within their occupation zone. Roatta met with Chetnik leader Ilija Trifunović-Birčanin on September 10 and 21. Trifunović-Birčanin urged him to take action "as soon as possible" in a large operation against the Yugoslav Partisans in the Prozor-Livno area and offered aid in the form of 7,500 Chetniks on the condition that they be provided the necessary arms and supplies. In the meeting on September 10, Trifunović-Birčanin told Roatta that he was not under the command of Draža Mihailović, but that he had seen him on July 21 in Avtovac and had his approval in collaborating with the Italians. In late September or early October, Mihailović, responding to a letter from Trifunović-Birčanin dated September 20, congratulated him on his conduct and "high comprehension of the national line" in these talks.

On 16 September 1942, Roatta reported to the Italian Supreme Command (Comando Supremo) that he had a total of 12,320 Chetniks under his command and the possibility of arming 6,000 more. By February 1943 there were 20,514 Chetniks under the command of the Italian Second Army.

In early October the Italian-Chetnik offensive Operation Alfa was launched and targeted Partisans northwest of the middle part of the Neretva. Between 3,000 and 5,500 Chetniks took part in the operation and were under the command of Petar Baćović and Dobroslav Jevđević. On 14–15 October 1942, while in progress of the operation, the Chetniks massacred 543 Catholic and Muslim civilians on the pretense that they harbored and aided the Partisans. Roatta objected to these "massive slaughters" of noncombatant civilians and threatened to halt Italian aid to the Chetniks if they did not end and stated that "I request that Commander Trifunović be apprised that if the Chetnik violence against the Croatian and Muslim population is not immediately stopped, we will stop supplying food and daily wages to those formations whose members are perpetrators of the violence. If this criminal situation continues, more severe measures will be undertaken."

On 10 October 1942, Mladen Lorković, Croatian minister of foreign affairs, wrote a letter and memorandum concerning the increase in Chetnik anti-Croatian activity and terror that occurred between August and September, especially in Herzegovina, central Dalmatia, and Lika. He repeated three demands: the removal of Chetniks from areas in which Catholics and Muslims resided; the removal of Serbian and Montenegrin Chetnik commanders from their posts; and the severe punishment of Chetniks that did not obey "the life, property, and honor of Croatian citizens and against the dignity of the Croatian state." A few days later on 15 October, Roatta held talks with Pavelić in Zagreb and primarily discussed the Chetniks and the handover of Jews to German or Croatian authorities. Roatta did not directly address the transfer of Jews and ultimately few were sent. In regard to the Chetniks, he promised to fulfill previous Croatian requests. On 31 October 1942, in response to the letter of protest by Lorković, Roatta claimed that the acts were not of "mass character" and that they were carried out by individuals and small groups uncontrolled by the MVAC or carried out by the Communists. He denied that the Italians supported any terrorist activity against the Croats and that intervention urging peace was undertaken when they had witnessed them.

On 16 December 1942, Adolf Hitler ordered the Armed Forces Commander in South-East Europe, Generaloberst Alexander Löhr to crush the resistance in Yugoslavia and on 8 January 1943, Roatta and Löhr met in Zagreb where they devised a detailed plan for Case White. Near the end of February 1943, Roatta was replaced by General Mario Robotti, commander of Italian troops in Slovenia, as commander of the Second Army. Robotti vigorously implemented Roatta's Circular 3C while in power and in September work on a permanent barricade that would encircle Ljubljana was begun.

=== Sicily ===
After leaving Yugoslavia, Roatta took over command of Sixth Army in Sicily on 11 February 1943. He got a decree from the Italian Supreme Command making him overall commander of all armed forces in Sicily, with seven military and nine civilian defense agencies under his command, with the exception of naval fortress areas of Augusta-Syracuse, Messina-Reggio and Trapani. He used his new authority to assign both military and civilian resources to work constructing bunkers, and installing anti-invasion obstacles on the most likely Allied landing beaches, as well as laying barbed wire and mines. In the middle of May 1943 Roatta gave a speech that included remarks that were disparaging about the Sicilians. Wary of how the Sicilians would react, given that relations between them and the mainland Italy were poor, Supreme Command removed Roatta, by moving him to Rome in June to replace General Vittorio Ambrosio as chief of staff of the Italian Army. He was replaced in command of Sixth Army by General Alfredo Guzzoni.

== Trial and later years ==
On 10 November 1943, the Allies requested that Italian Marshal Pietro Badoglio remove Roatta from his post as chief of staff of the Italian Army due to Yugoslavia's charges that he committed war crimes. On 12 November, Roatta was dismissed from his post. In 1944, he was arrested by the Italians for war crimes. Yugoslavia unsuccessfully requested Roatta's extradition, but the British government frustrated such requests due to their attempt to bolster the anti-Communist position of the Italian government. Historian Alessandra Kersevan and journalist Rory Carroll have accused the Italian public and media of repressing their collective memory of the atrocities committed by Italy during World War II, and of "historical amnesia". They cite the forgiveness of Roatta, and the jailing of two Italian filmmakers who depicted the Italian invasion of Greece, as examples of historical revisionism.

Roatta was put on trial in Italy, but on 5 March 1945, he escaped from the Virgilio Army Hospital in Rome. A reward of one million lire ($10,000) was offered for his capture. The following day, a "mild mass meeting" took place at the Italian royal palace in protest of his escape and escalated into a riot ending with one person dead. On 4 April, Sergeant Stuart W. Mathes put up a personal reward of $20,000 for Roatta's capture. Roatta fled to Spain, where he lived under the protection of dictator Francisco Franco. Roatta was subsequently convicted and sentenced in absentia to life imprisonment plus one year of solitary confinement. His sentence was overturned by the Italian High Court of Appeal in 1948. Beginning in 1964, a number of Roatta's works were published. He returned to Rome in 1966, and lived there until his death on 7 January 1968.

== Personal life ==
Roatta married Ines Mancini on 14 January 1922. The couple had a child, Sergio, who was born in 1928.

== Notes ==
Military offices
| Preceded by | Deputy Chief of Staff of the Italian Army; October 1939 – March 1941 | Succeeded by |
| Preceded by General Rodolfo Graziani | Chief of Staff of the Italian Army; March 1941 – January 1942 | Succeeded by General Giovanni Messe |
| Preceded by General Vittorio Ambrosio | Commander of the Italian 2nd Army; January 1942 – February 1943 | Succeeded by General Mario Robotti |
| Preceded by General Giovanni Messe | Chief of Staff of the Italian Army; June 1943 – November 1943 | Succeeded by |
