= Operation Alfa =

1942 World War II offensive in Yugoslavia

- Part of World War II in Yugoslavia
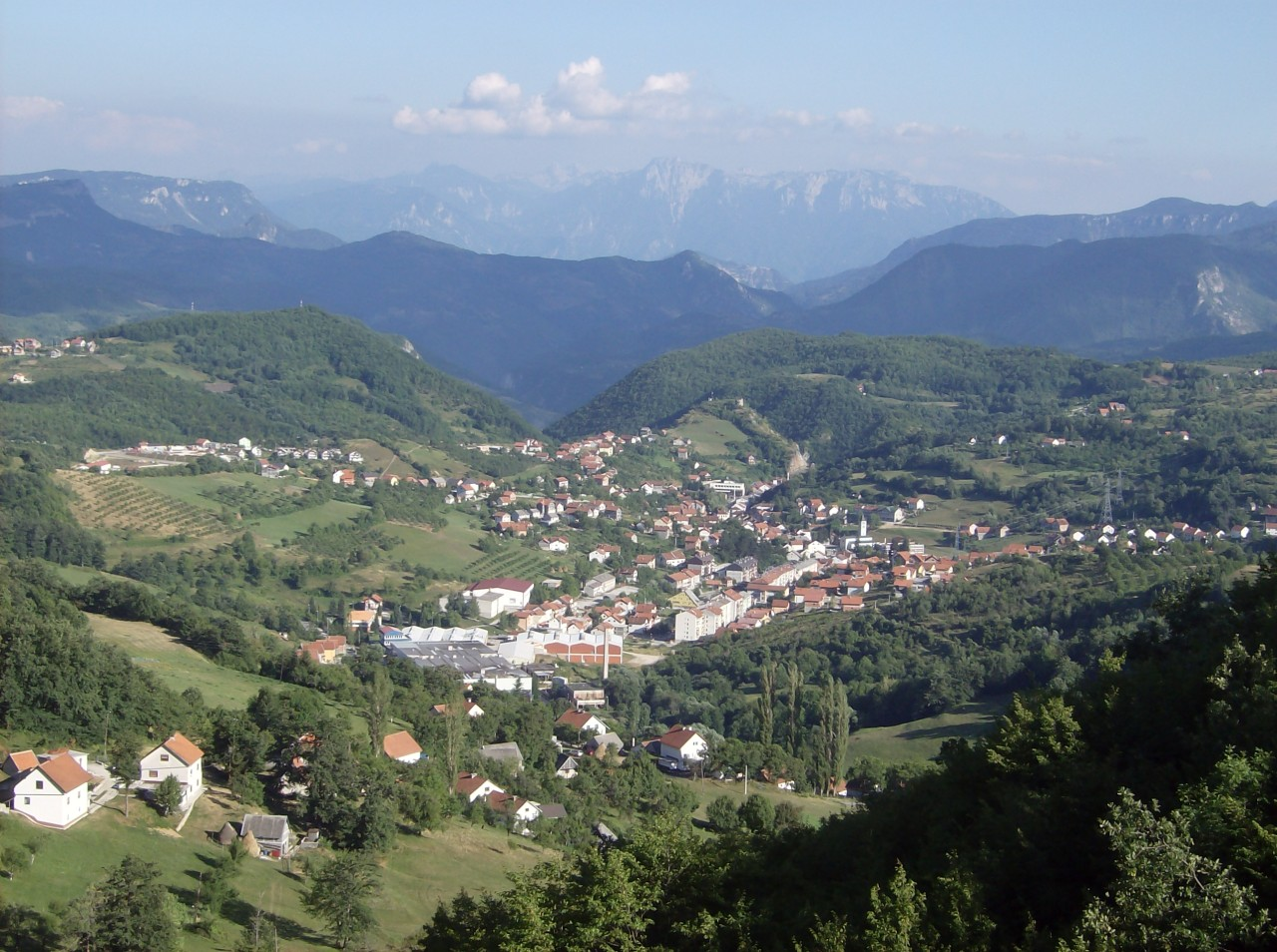
- View of Prozor in 2010
Date	early October 1942
Location	Prozor, then part of the Independent State of Croatia (present-day Bosnia and Herzegovina)
Result	Partisan retreat and massacre of inhabitants by Chetnik forces

Belligerents
Italy; Chetniks; Independent State of Croatia	Yugoslav Partisans

Commanders and leaders
(Fascist Italy) Guglielmo Spicacci (Chetniks) Dobroslav Jevđević (Chetniks) Petar Baćović	(Yugoslav Partisans) Vlado Šegrt

Units involved
(Fascist Italy) 2nd and 29th Bersaglieri Battalions of the 94th Regiment from the 18th Infantry Division Messina; Trebinje, Nevesinje, and Romanija Chetnik Corps (Independent State of Croatia) 7th and 15th Infantry Regiments of the Croatian Home Guard	(Yugoslav Partisans) 3 Battalions of the 10th Herzegovinian Brigade

Strength
(Fascist Italy) 4,000 soldiers 3,000–5,500 soldiers	(Yugoslav Partisans) 300 partisans

Casualties and losses
- 543–2,500 Croat and Muslim civilians

Operation Alfa (Italian: Operazione Alfa; Serbo-Croatian: Operacija Alfa, Операција Алфа) was an offensive carried out in early October 1942 by the military forces of Italy and the Axis puppet state, the Independent State of Croatia (NDH), supported by Chetnik forces under the control of vojvoda Ilija Trifunović-Birčanin. The offensive was directed against the communist-led Partisans in the Prozor region (today in Bosnia and Herzegovina), then a part of the NDH. The operation was militarily inconclusive, and in the aftermath, Chetnik forces conducted mass killings of civilians in the area.

The operation was arranged between Generale designato d'armata (acting General) Mario Roatta, commander of the Italian Second Army, and Trifunović-Birčanin, with the approval of the overall Chetnik leader Draža Mihailović. It was carried out in coordination with the Germans and included elements of the Croatian Home Guard and the NDH Air Force. Faced with heavy weaponry and seriously outnumbered, the Partisans retreated and withdrew from Prozor without significant fighting. Chetniks elements under the command of Dobroslav Jevđević and Petar Baćović then massacred between 543 and 2,500 Croats and Muslims and destroyed numerous villages in the area. Following protests from both the Italians and the Croatian authorities, the Chetnik elements were discharged or relocated. Italian and NDH forces followed up Operation Alfa with Operation Beta, which was focused on capturing Livno and surrounding localities. Baćović was killed by NDH forces near the end of the war, while Jevđević escaped to Italy and avoided prosecution by the new Yugoslav government. Mihailović was captured by the communist authorities following the war, tried and found guilty for the Chetnik actions at Prozor (among other charges), and was sentenced to death and executed.

== Background ==
On 6 April 1941, the Axis powers invaded the Kingdom of Yugoslavia, resulting in the capitulation of the Royal Yugoslav Army on 17 April. Yugoslavia was broken up, and one of the fragments was an Axis puppet state, the Ustaše-led Independent State of Croatia (Serbo-Croatian: Nezavisna Država Hrvatska, NDH), which consisted of modern-day Croatia and Bosnia and Herzegovina, and was effectively an Italo-German quasi-protectorate. The NDH was divided by a German–Italian demarcation line, known as the "Vienna Line", with the Germans occupying the northern and northeastern parts of the NDH, and the Italians the southern and southwestern parts. The NDH immediately implemented genocidal policies against the Serb, Jewish and Romani population within its borders. Initial armed resistance consisted of two loosely cooperating factions, the communist-led Partisans, and the Chetniks who were mostly led by Serb-chauvinist officers of the defeated Royal Yugoslav Army. However, the Chetniks, in their pursuit of an ethnically pure Greater Serbia, soon adopted a policy of collaboration and cooperated "extensively and systematically" with Italian forces. In July and August 1942, under the protection provided by the Italians, the Chetniks thoroughly ethnically cleansed eastern Herzegovina of its Croats and Muslims.

In September 1942, the Chetniks, knowing that they could not defeat the Partisans alone, attempted to persuade the Italians into carrying out a significant operation within their occupation zone. On 10 and 21 September, Chetnik vojvoda Ilija Trifunović-Birčanin met with Generale designato d'armata (acting General) Mario Roatta, commander of the Italian Second Army. He informed Roatta that he was not under the command of Draža Mihailović, but that he had seen Mihailović in Avtovac in the Herzegovina region of the NDH on 21 July and that he had his approval in collaborating with the Italians. Trifunović-Birčanin urged Roatta to take action "as soon as possible" in a major operation against the Partisans in the Prozor–Livno area of northern Herzegovina. In return Trifunović-Birčanin offered support in the form of 7,500 Chetniks, on the condition that they be provided the necessary arms and supplies. Roatta provided "some arms and promises of action" in response to Trifunović-Birčanin's demands. Mihailović later congratulated Trifunović-Birčanin on his conduct and "high comprehension of the [Serbian] national line" in these arrangements.

== Timeline ==
=== Prelude ===
In early October, the operation was launched by the Italians targeting Partisans located northwest of the middle part of the Neretva River. Elements of the 18th Infantry Division Messina, commanded by Generale di divisione (Divisional general) Guglielmo Spicacci took part, consisting of the 29th Battalion of the 4th Bersaglieri Regiment and the 2nd Battalion of the 94th Regiment. Between 3,000 and 5,500 Chetniks took part in the operation under the command of Dobroslav Jevđević and Petar Baćović. Partisan sources reported 4,000 soldiers of the Italian 6th Army Corps and 5,000 Chetniks of the Trebinje, Nevesinje, and Romanija Corps as being involved. NDH units involved included the 7th and 15th Infantry Regiments, as well as the NDH Air Force.

The operation was coordinated with Germans and NDH armed forces located near northern Partisan territory in the direction of Banja Luka. The Chetniks arrived by train from Dubrovnik and Metković and by Italian trucks from Nevesinje. On 2–3 October they arrived in Mostar and left on 3 October. The same day, they killed one villager and committed mass looting in the village of Raška Gora, 10 kilometres (6.2 mi) north of Mostar. In the village of Gorani, 7 kilometres (4.3 mi) southwest of Mostar, three villagers were killed and, as elsewhere, they carried out looting and burning. The next day they were in Drežnica where Jevđević gave a speech that "the chief enemy of Serbs are the Partisans, then the Ustaše. They need to be ruthlessly destroyed and the other left alone". Subsequently, the Chetniks killed between 62 and 142 people, looted, and burned buildings in the town. In total, some 200 Croats and Muslims were killed by Chetniks in the Mostar area immediately prior to Operation Alfa.

=== Operation ===
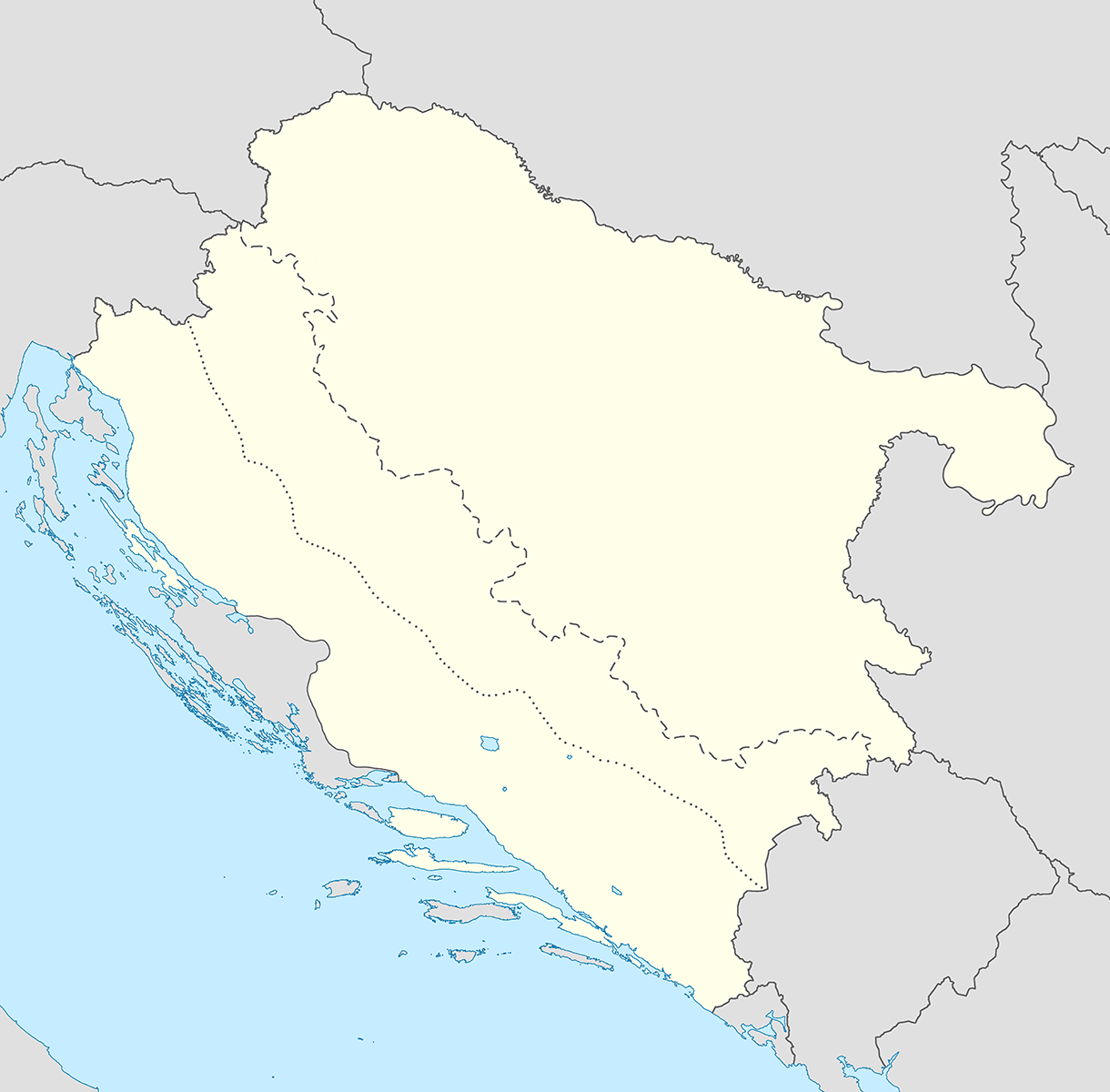
Map of the NDH with the demarcation line (dashed) between the Italian (southwest) and German (northeast) zones, showing Prozor and other major towns in the area of operations.

On 4–5 October the Chetniks crossed the Neretva River in Konjic and headed, as did the Italians, towards Prozor, Šćit, Gornji Vakuf, Donji Vakuf, and on to Bugojno, Komar, and Travnik where the headquarters of the Partisan 5th Montenegrin and the 10th Herzegovinian Brigades were situated. The offensive was launched from three directions with light and heavy artillery and a large number of tanks and trucks converging. Three battalions of the 10th Herzegovinian Brigade, commanded by Vlado Šegrt, intended to assemble near Prozor, but withdrew and escaped on 6 October before the arrival of the Italian–Chetnik forces. The Partisan battalions estimated that 1,200–1,500 soldiers of the Italian army and about 3,000–3,500 Chetniks were approaching, while they had a little over 300 men, a ratio of approximately 1:15.

On 7–8 October the Italians heavily bombed Prozor with artillery and airplanes and entered the town on 8 October. On the same day, Mihailović informed his commanders in Herzegovina that "now is the definite time to wipe out the communists" and to be as tactical as possible with the Muslims and Croats. The nature of these tactics required the Muslims to "only be organized under the command of our [Chetnik] military leaders and in our struggle against the Ustaše and the communists with complete loyalty to the Serb population to repair the shameful role they've played since the capitulation of Yugoslavia up to today". He also called for the Muslims to "take part in the liquidation of those Muslims who still today work against the Serb people". As for the Croats: "what will become of the borders of the Croatian unit and what rights the Croats will have in the new state of the future will depend solely on them". He explained that "if they continue to be inactive, there will be no force that will be able to protect them from the retribution of the Serb people, so let them guide themselves in accordance with that" and announced that after the "liquidation of communists, they will be able to liquidate the Ustaša".

On 14–15 October, the Chetniks, acting on their own, massacred over five hundred Croats and Muslims and burnt numerous villages in the process of the operation on the suspicion that they "harbored and aided the Partisans". According to the historian Jozo Tomasevich, incomplete data shows 543 civilians were massacred. At least 656 victims are known by name while another source says about 848 people, mainly "children, women, and the elderly", were killed. Historian Ivo Goldstein estimates 1,500 were massacred in total and attributes the discrepancy "due to the fact that the estimates refer to different territories". The historians Antun Miletić and Vladimir Dedijer place the figure killed at 2,500.

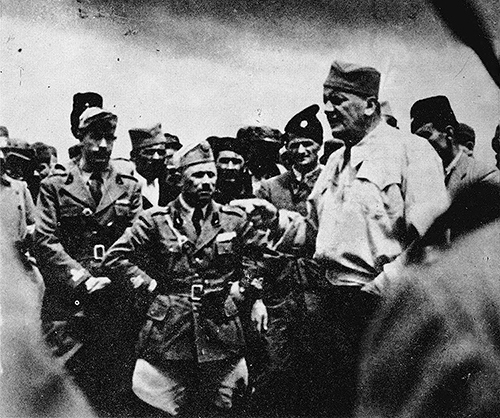
Dobroslav Jevđević (in white) led a part of the Chetnik force that participated in Operation Alfa

In the following days, around 2,000 Chetniks were in the district of Prozor. According to Hoare, the Ustase complained about the burning of Croat and Muslim villages, and the associated killings of civilians, and this compelled the Italians to discipline the Chetniks and disband some of their units. According to Partisan sources, the Chetniks moved southeast to the Neretva River and Mostar at the request of Italian officers. These sources claim that this was done because Chetnik and Italian atrocities caused great resentment in the local population, especially within the Croatian Home Guard, which felt obliged to intervene militarily in such instances. Chetnik commanders argued that this move was initiated by the Germans to prevent the Chetniks from heading west towards Mount Dinara. After the killings, the Muslim Chetnik leader Ismet Popovac arrived in the town to console the local population and to advise the Chetniks there against committing further atrocities. He also attempted to convince local Muslims to join the Chetnik ranks but was unsuccessful due to the extent of Chetnik atrocities against the Muslim population.

On 23 October, Baćović reported to Mihailović that "in the operation of Prozor we slaughtered more than 2,000 Croats and Muslims. Our soldiers returned enthusiastic." Borba, a Partisan newspaper, also reported that about 2,000 were "killed by the Chetniks in Croatian and Muslim villages of Prozor, Konjic, and Vakuf". The report also mentions that "the districts of Prozor and Konjic have hundreds of slaughtered and murdered women and children as well as burnt houses".

== Aftermath ==
Roatta objected to the mass slaughters and said Italian support for the Chetniks would come to a halt if they did not cease. He requested that "commander Trifunović be apprised that if the Chetnik violence against the Croatian and Muslim population is not immediately stopped, we will stop supplying food and daily wages to those formations whose members are perpetrators of the violence. If this criminal situation continues, more severe measures will be undertaken". The massacre upset the NDH government which compelled the Italians to force the Chetniks to withdraw. Some forces were discharged while some were relocated to join Momčilo Đujić's forces in northern Dalmatia. Operation Beta later followed in the same month in which the Italians and NDH forces captured Livno and surrounding localities. Hoare observes that despite the Italian reaction, they continued to rely on Chetnik forces and granted them "a degree of freedom in their treatment of the Muslim and Croat population". The inability of the NDH regime to protect the Muslim population of Herzegovina pushed the latter towards opposing the Ustaše.

After the war an indictment was issued against Jevđević in Sarajevo. It charged that under his command in "the first half of October 1942 in and around Prozor they [Italians and Chetniks] butchered and killed 1,716 persons of both sexes, Croatian and Muslim nations, and plundered and burnt about 500 households". A month after the massacre, Jevđević and Baćović wrote a self-critical report on Prozor to Mihailović in order to distance themselves from responsibility. Jevđević fled to Italy at the end of the war where Allied military authorities arrested and detained him at a camp. They ignored Yugoslavia's request for extradition and set him free. He avoided trial and died in Rome in 1962. Baćović was killed by the Ustaše in 1945.

Mihailović was captured and indicted following the end of the war and in 1946 the Supreme Court of Yugoslavia judged him guilty of leading a movement "which committed numerous war crimes against people" that, among other things, in "October 1942, under the leadership of Petar Baćović together with the Italians, killed in the vicinity of Prozor about 2,500 Muslims and Croats, among whom were women, children, and the elderly, and burnt a large number of villages". He was sentenced to death and executed.
