= Mario Robotti =

Italian general (1882–1955)

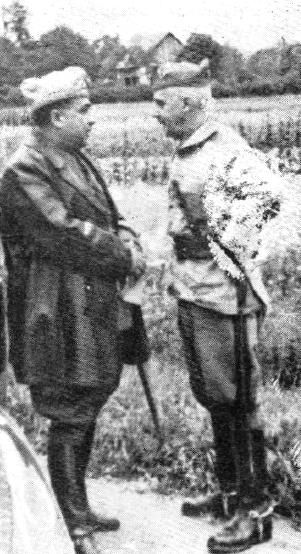
Robotti (right) talking with Taddeo Orlando

Mario Robotti (25 November 1882 – 1955) was a general in the Royal Italian Army who commanded the XI Corps during the World War II Axis invasion of Yugoslavia in April 1941.

He then became military commander in the Province of Ljubljana, the Italian-annexed zone of Slovenia. In February 1943, he succeeded general Mario Roatta as commander of the Italian Second Army in occupied Yugoslavia. General Robotti while commanding Italian troops in Axis occupied Yugoslavia in anti-partisan operations, was noted for his brutality, even once complaining to his officers that "you are not slaughtering enough people." During the winter of 1942–1943, Robotti personally chose 10 local dignitaries from the Slovene capital, Ljubljana, and had them imprisoned in the city and then stated that they would be executed if the partisans chose to make an attack on the city.

At the time of the Armistice of Cassibile in September 1943, he escaped capture by the Germans and retired to a private life in Rapallo, where he lived with his family.
