= Makarska massacre =

1942 mass murder of Croat civilians

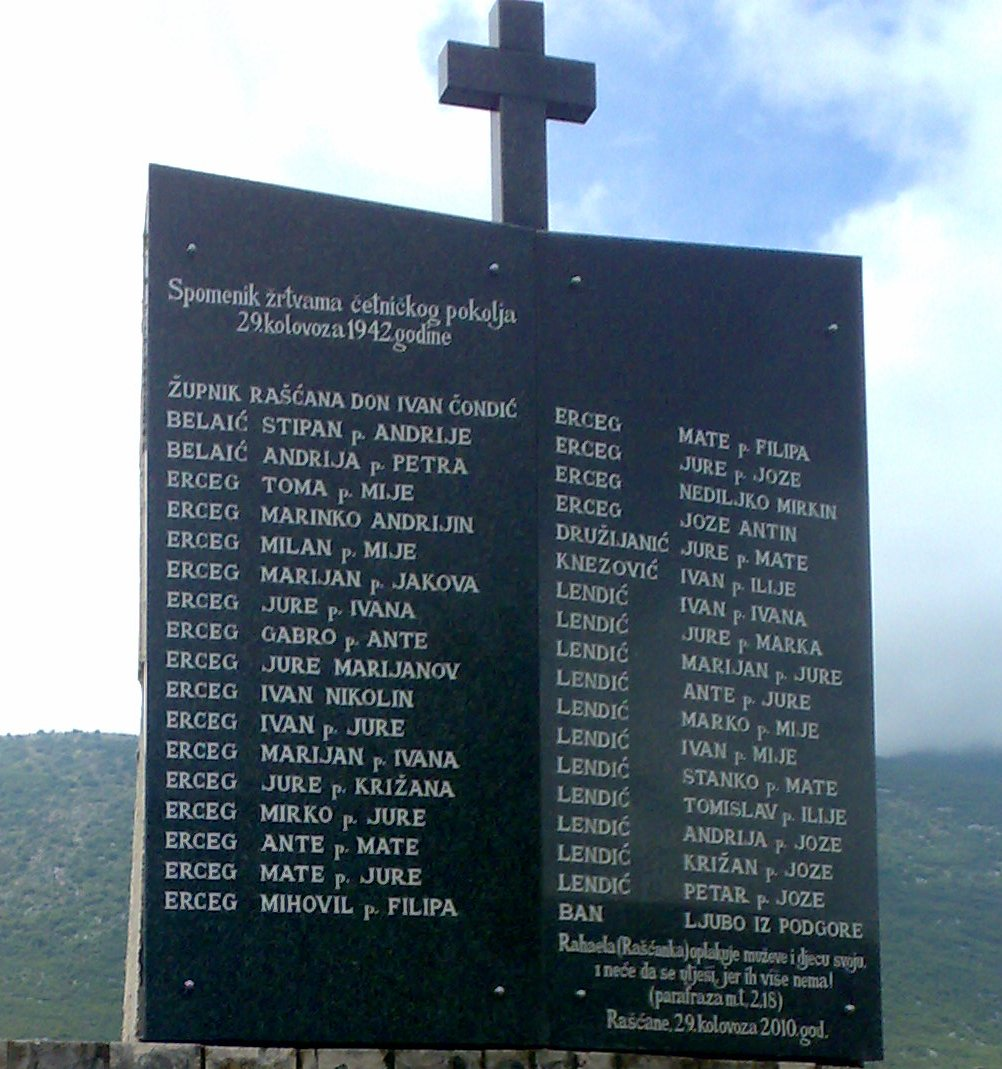
- Memorial plaque to the inhabitants of the village of Rašćane, who were killed by Chetniks on 29 August 1942
- Location: Villages in the Dalmatian Hinterland, near Makarska
- Date: 29 August–3 September 1942
- Target: Croats
- Attack type: Mass murder
- Deaths: 900
- Perpetrator: Chetniks

The Makarska massacre (Croatian: Pokolj u Makarskoj) was the mass murder of Croat civilians by Chetnik forces, led by Petar Baćović, from 29 August until early-September 1942, across several villages in the Dalmatian Hinterland of southern Croatia, around the town of Makarska.

== Timeline ==
The massacres took place during the final stages of the Italian-led Operation "Albia", which involved the participation of hundreds of Chetnik forces from Herzegovina and local MVAC Chetniks, with the objective of destroying Partisan forces in the Biokovo area. During their advance to the Makarska coast, Chetnik forces destroyed and massacred several Croat villages. The first attacks started on 29 August 1942, with the destruction of the Croat villages of Rašćane, Kozica, Dragljane and Župa, near Vrgorac. Hundreds of homes were destroyed and between 141 and 160 Croat civilians were killed. Among those killed included three Catholic Priests, who were skinned alive before being killed.

Baćović's Chetniks continued their advance to the Makarska coast into September 1942, razing a total of 17 Croat villages and killing 900 Croats.

In a report sent by Baćović to Draža Mihailović in September 1942, it was reported that:

“I made my way to Herzegovina. Four of our battalions, about 900 people, started over Ljubuški, Imotski and Podgora on August 30 and made a breakthrough to the sea near Makarska. Seventeen villages were burned, 900 Ustashe killed, several Catholic priests skinned alive. For the first time since the collapse I put the Serbian flag in the sea and shouted salute to the king and Draža. Our losses are minimal.”

On 3 September 1942, Mihailović replied to Baćovic's report:

“I am satisfied with the report on the breakthrough to the sea. Use this action to set up a secure channel to connect with Dinara Division. After this you have to clean up the space between: Mostar - Konjic - Visoko - Travnik - Jajce - Livno together with the dinars in the shortest possible time."

== Aftermath ==
The crimes committed by Chetnik forces in the Makarska area were discussed as part of the trial against Draža Mihailović in 1946. Mihailović was ultimately found guilty of eight counts of crimes against humanity and high treason. Mihailović, sentenced to death on 15 July 1946, was executed with nine other Chetnik commanders in Lisičji Potok in the early hours of 18 July 1946.
