= Battle of Livno =

Battles fought during WWII

Coordinates: 43°50′N 17°04′E

Operation Beta
- Part of World War II in Yugoslavia
Date	21 – 23 October 1942
Location	Livno
Result	Partisans withdraw, Axis takes Livno

Belligerents
Italy; Independent State of Croatia	(Democratic Federal Yugoslavia) Yugoslav partisans

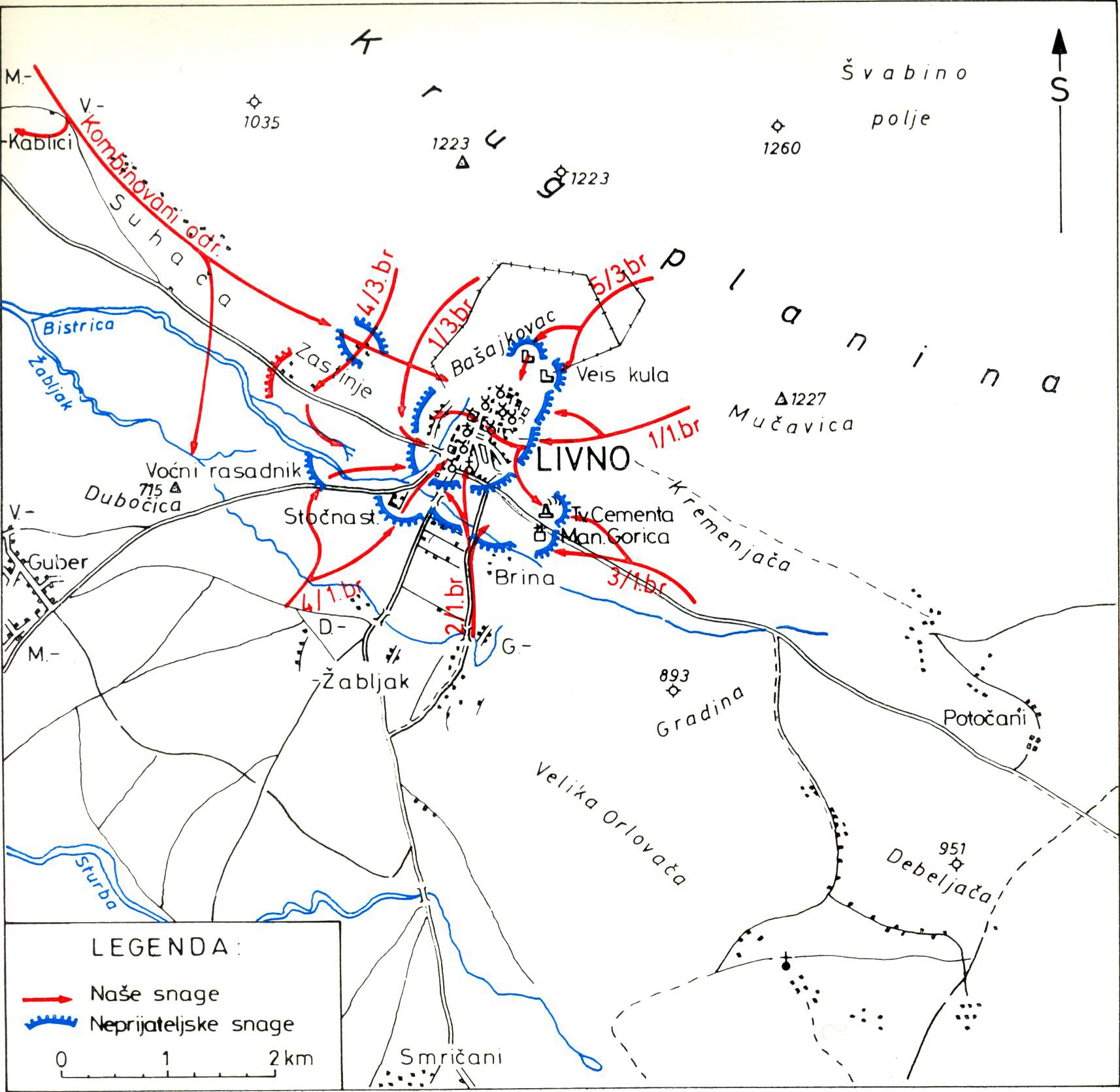
Attack on Livno

The Battle of Livno is the name of several battles fought over the town of Livno during World War II, which changed hands between the Independent State of Croatia and Partisan forces several times.

== Operation Beta ==
Operation Beta followed on the heels of Operation Alfa in which Italian forces retook Prozor from the Partisans. Ten Italian battalions and two Ustaše battalions took the city from the Partisans with neither side suffering many casualties.

== Battle for Livno (late 1942) ==
Battle of Livno
- Part of World War II in Yugoslavia
Date	5–15 December 1942
Location	Livno
Result	Ustaše withdrawal, Partisans take Livno

Belligerents
Independent State of Croatia; 5th Ustaše Brigade	(Democratic Federal Yugoslavia) Yugoslav partisans 2nd Proletarian Division

Commanders and leaders
Rafael Boban	

Strength
1,200 soldiers	3,000 soldiers

The defence of the city was led by Rafael Boban and elements of his Black Legion. The battle resulted in Boban's forces retreating from Livno. Approximately 100 Croatian soldiers and 74 Partisan soldiers were killed in the battle.

== Operation Ziethen ==
Operation Ziethen
- Part of World War II in Yugoslavia
Date	4–6 December 1943
Location	Livno
Result	Axis victory

Belligerents
Nazi Germany; Independent State of Croatia	(Democratic Federal Yugoslavia) Yugoslav partisans

Operation Ziethen was a German-Croatian military operation which sought to reestablish control over the Livno–Šuica–Duvno area. The entire operation was a great success for the Axis forces.
