= 2nd Army (Italy) =

Field army of the Royal Italian Army

2ª Armata 2nd Army
- Active: 1915 – 1945
- Country: Kingdom of Italy
- Branch: Royal Italian Army
- Type: Field army
- Engagements: World War I: Battle of Caporetto; World War II: World War II in Yugoslavia; Operation Alfa; Battle of the Transdanubian Hills

The 2nd Army (Italian: 2ª Armata) was a World War I and World War II field army of the Royal Italian Army.

== World War I ==
In 1917, during World War I, the 2nd Army was deployed under Luigi Capello at the Battle of Caporetto after orders by Luigi Cadorna; during the battle, it took a heavy blow, ultimately leading to its collapse for the time being. On 24 October 1917, Capello, who was ill with a fever at the time, failed to gain authorization to withdraw his forces; Cadorna had vetoed the request, although, 6 days later, he would eventually agree and gave orders to retreat past the Tagliamento River, Capello's original requested location.

=== Commanders ===
- General Pietro Frugoni (May 1915 - June 1916)
- General Settimio Piacentini (July 1916 - June 1917)
- General Luigi Capello (June 1917 - October 1917)
- General Luca Montuori, ad interim (October 1917)
- General Luigi Capello (October 1917 - 1918)

== World War II ==
During World War II the 2nd Army was the Italian (Complex Major) Great Unit charged, from 1940 to 1943, of the activities of control and garrison of the occupied or annexed territories of the former Kingdom of Yugoslavia.

2nd Army ORBAT, depending units:

- "Comando Superiore Forze Armate (FF.AA.) di Slovenia e Dalmazia" - "Supersloda"
- V Corps, in Lika
- VI Corps, in Herzegovina
- XI Corps, in Southern Dalmatia and Herzegovina
- XVIII Corps, from 18 February 1942; General Quirino Armellini then Umberto Spigo around Zara and Spalato responsible for the territories from Graciaz to the Narenta river
- Comando Truppe Montenegro: XIV Corps, in Montenegro (a functionally dependent Command and Great Unit but not a constituent part of the 2nd Army)

Initially 250,000 men strong in 15 divisions, the 4 immediately dependent Corps were then reduced to 230,000 men in 13 divisions. The 2nd Army was a second line force with most of the men in their late 30s and early 40s, the only really largely combat ready and effective (Simple Major) Great Unit was the assigned component of the Alpine Division Julia only partially deployed in the yugoslav theatre of operations as a whole unit.
In October 1942, the 2nd Army helped execute Operation Alfa, along with supporting Chetnik forces. After the armistice of Cassibile on September 8, 1943, and the announcement by Italy of war on Germany, all activities ceased and the 2nd Army was dissolved in Mali Lošinj on 11 September.
Parts of the 2nd Italian army were withdrawn into the mountains of Dalmatia and joined the Yugoslav Partisans, under command of Josip Broz Tito, which formed the Italian Partisan Division "Garibaldi". Other parts of the 2nd Army also keep fighting against the Germans along with the Yugoslav partisans in Division Italia (Yugoslavia), during 1944–1945. They helped the Soviet and Bulgarian army fighting against the German army in Croatia, Hungary and Austria.

=== Commanders ===
- General Vittorio Ambrosio (December 10, 1938 – January 20, 1942)
- General Mario Roatta (January 20, 1942 – February 5, 1943)
- General Mario Robotti (February 5, 1943 – September 8, 1943)

== See also ==
- V.A.C.
