= Avtovac =

Avtovac Автовац
- Village
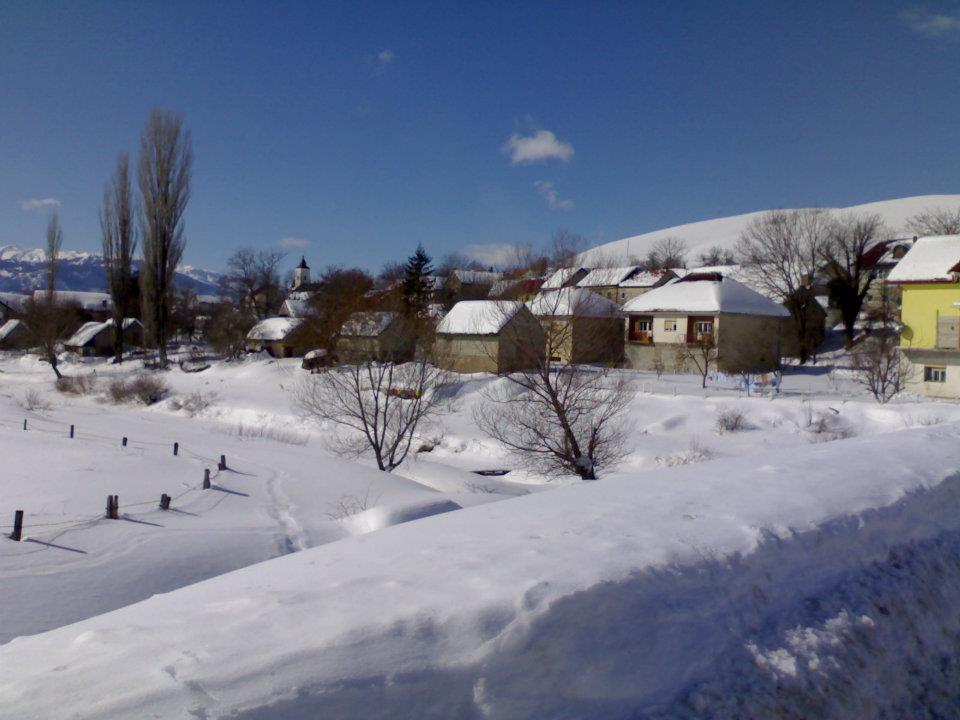

- Location within Republika Srpska Location within Bosnia and Herzegovina
- Coordinates: 43°08′19″N 18°34′24″E
- Country: Bosnia and Herzegovina
- Entity: Republika Srpska
- Municipality: Gacko
- Time zone: UTC+1 (CET)
  - Summer (DST): UTC+2 (CEST)

Avtovac (Serbian Cyrillic: Автовац) is a small village in the municipality of Gacko, Republika Srpska, Bosnia and Herzegovina.
