= Danilo Stanisavljević =

Croatian Chetnik commander

- Данило Станисављевић
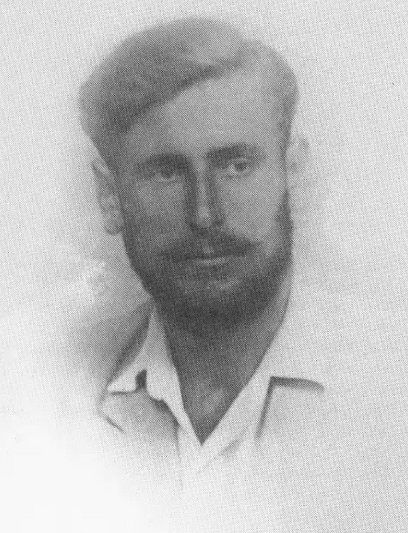
- Born: Danilo Stanisavljević; 1917; Gračac, Croatia-Slavonia, Austria-Hungary (now Croatia)
- Died: 24 October 1942 (aged 24–25); Gračac, Independent State of Croatia
- Other name: Dane Cicvara
- Military career
- Allegiance: Kingdom of Yugoslavia: Chetniks
- Rank: voivode
- Nickname: Dane
- Commands: Chetnik Regiment "Vožd Karađorđe": Gračac Chetnik Shock Battalion "Gavrilo Princip"
- First attack of Serb rebels on Ustaše (12 April 1941): Battle for Gračac

Danilo "Dane" Stanisavljević (Serbian Cyrillic: Данило Дане Станисављевић; 1917 – 24 October 1942) was a Croatian Serb revolutionary who was one of the leaders of the uprising of Serbs in Lika against the Independent State of Croatia and later a military officer of the Chetnik units with the rank of voivode.

Commonly known as Dane Cicvara (Serbian Cyrillic: Дане Цицвара), he is best known for being commander of Serb rebels from Gračac who were first to attack the Ustaše of the Independent State of Croatia on 12 April 1941. His elder brother Todor was also member of the rebels. After the Srb uprising, the rebel-controlled territory was peacefully integrated into the Italian occupation zone which for a while saved lives of the remaining Serbs in the region from the ongoing genocide of Serbs by the Independent State of Croatia. Stanisavljević was appointed as a commander of the Gračac Chetnik battalion "Gavrilo Princip". He was also an acting commander of the Chetnik regiment "Vožd Karađorđe".

The Croatian Communist Party and its armed formations of Partisans targeted Stanisavljević because they perceived him and other Chetniks as an obstacle for their revolutionary aims and killed him on 24 October 1942.

== Early life ==
Stanisavljević was born in 1917 in the village Dojići near Gračac, Austria-Hungary (modern-day Croatia). Stanisavljević served in the Royal Yugoslav Army as member of the Mountain Regiment in Ljubljana. He was selected to attend the funeral of Mustafa Kemal Atatürk on 21 November 1938 as a member of the honorary guard unit. He had a brother, Todor "Toćan" Stanisavljević, who was also a member of the resistance movement.

== World War II ==
Stanisavljević was commander of Serb rebels from Gračac who were first to attack Ustaše of the Independent State of Croatia on 12 April 1941. On that day rebels commanded by Stanisavljević defended Gračac from Ustaše units coming from Gospić. This action gained Yugoslav Chetnik character because the rebels from Gračac were joined by 50 marines of Yugoslav Royal Navy commanded by Captain Mirko Blajvajz, the commander of the nearby Selce coast command. According to historian Žutić, the first Chetnik units were established near Doboj on the same day by soldiers of the Royal Yugoslav Army. The Chetnik leaders of Lika and Bosnian Krajina wished to save Serbs from their most bloodthirsty enemy - Ustaše, even if they had temporarily to accept rule of Italians and Germans.

In December 1941 the Gračac Chetnik Battalion "Gavrilo Princip" was established. Stanisavljević was appointed as its commander and as acting commander of the Chetnik Regiment "Vožd Karađorđe". Stanisavljević closely collaborated with Pajica Omčikus in Srb and Momčilo Đujić and Niko Novaković Longo.

As commander of Chetnik Battalion, in the middle of May 1942 Stanisavljević issued proclamation titled "Serbs of Dalmatia". In this proclamation he invited Serbs who joined Partisans under control of the Communist Party of Croatia to leave the Partisans who were accused to be the main enemies of Serbs and being under command of Ustaše. This proclamation invited them to join Yugoslav Army in the Fatherland instead.

The Croatian communists targeted Stanisavljević and ordered Partisan unit from Gračac to kill him and all members of the headquarters of Chetnik regiment. According to Milan Šijan, the commander of communist 3rd Lika Brigade, Stanisavljević was a little earlier promoted to the rank of voivode of Lika and Kordun. The partisans attacked the officers of the Chetnik Gračac Brigade and killed 70 Chetniks including Stanisavljević and many other members of the Chetnik command. According to Šijan, Stanisavljević was first wounded when Aleksa Jakšić shot him using light machine gun. Šijan emphasized that Stanisavljević committed suicide not to allow communists to capture him alive. Other communist published sources emphasize that Cicvara and other Chetniks were killed by Partisans who used only knives and bombs.

== Sources ==
- Đuretić, Veselin (1997). Nasilje nad srpskim ustankom: opsene naroda u ime "Rusije i komunizma". Srpska akademija nauka i umetnosti. ISBN 9788671790246.
- Šijan, Milan (1970). Treća lička brigada. Vojnoizdavački zavod.
- Jelić-Butić, Fikreta (1986). Četnici u Hrvatskoj, 1941-1945. Globus. ISBN 9788634300109.
- Dizdar, Zdravko (2002). Četnički zločini u Bosni i Hercegovini, 1941.-1945. Hrvatski institut za povijest. ISBN 978-953-6491-86-5.
