= Stevo Rađenović =

Politician and Chetnik leader in WWII

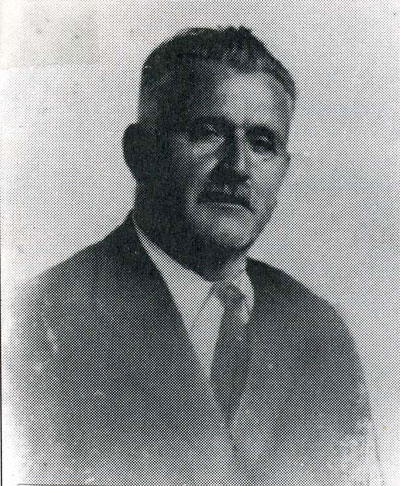
Stevo Rađenović

Stevo Rađenović (died 1961) was a Yugoslav Radical Union politician during the interwar period and a Chetnik leader in the Lika region of the Axis puppet state, the Independent State of Croatia (Croatian: Nezavisna Država Hrvatska, NDH) during World War II. He was a prominent leader of the July 1941 Srb uprising against the genocidal Ustaše-led NDH government, and was the first Chetnik leader in the region to reach an understanding with the Royal Italian Army in order to collaborate with them against the Yugoslav Partisans.

He died in 1961.

== Interwar career ==
During the interwar period, Rađenović was a politician and deputy of the Yugoslav Radical Union (Serbo-Croatian Latin: Jugoslovenska radikalna zajednica, JRZ) in the Parliament of Yugoslavia representing the village of Srb in the Lika region. The JRZ was a party founded in 1935 as a moderate authoritarian movement, but moved towards a fascist model under the leadership of Milan Stojadinović, who was Prime Minister of Yugoslavia from 1935 to 1939.

== Srb Uprising ==
=== Background ===
The Kingdom of Yugoslavia was drawn into World War II following the Yugoslav coup d'état of 27 March 1941 and the German-led Axis invasion of Yugoslavia that followed on 6 April 1941. Yugoslavia was quickly defeated and dismembered by the Axis powers, and before the Yugoslavs had even surrendered, the Germans orchestrated the creation of a puppet state known as the Independent State of Croatia (Croatian: Nezavisna Država Hrvatska, NDH). The NDH government was formed by the Ustaše, a Croatian fascist and ultranationalist movement. Italy annexed much of Dalmatia and some other parts of Yugoslav territory, and the NDH was divided into German and Italian zones of influence along what became known as the Vienna Line. The Rome Treaties of 18 May formalised the Italian annexations, largely fixed the borders of the NDH, and put in place military arrangements. These specified that a significant area in the Italian zone of influence (known as Zone II) was to be demilitarised, with only NDH civilian administration permitted. A smaller area of the Italian zone of influence (Zone III) was free from such restrictions. Once these agreements were concluded, Italian troops withdrew from the NDH, and were deployed only in the annexed areas (Zone I). The region of Lika fell within Zone II.

The Ustaše immediately implemented genocidal policies against Serbs, Jews and Romani people within the NDH, with mass killings of Serbs beginning towards the end of April.

=== Uprising ===
In late May, a meeting of Serb leaders was held in the village of Kistanje; those attending included Rađenović and Momčilo Đujić, a priest from the village of Strmica, and a number of refugees from nearby areas of the NDH. Soon after this meeting, these leaders made contact with the Italian authorities in Zone I. On 23 July, the prefect of the newly annexed Italian province of Zara (Serbo-Croatian Latin: Zadar), Vezio Orazi, arranged a meeting of Serb nationalists, which included Đujić, Rađenović, Rađenović's brother-in-law Pajo Omčikus, the Chetnik vojvoda Vlade Novaković, the priest Ilija Zečević, and the lawyer Uroš Desnica from Obrovac.

The commander of the Italian VI Corps in Dalmatia, Generale di Corpo d'Armata (Lieutenant General) Renzo Dalmazzo blamed the revolt on the Ustaše and Muslims, and was never comfortable with the official Italian "hands-off" policy with the NDH. He decided to take the matter into his own hands to make allies of the Serb rebels. He used the Knin district as a test case, reporting confidently to his superiors that a nearby rebel group of over 1,000 men had no intention of causing any incident that would necessitate an Italian reaction. He directed his troops in Knin to disarm the 60 Ustaše troops in the town on 30–31 July, and on 1 August the Serb rebels entered the town without incident. The rebels then promised not to attack troop movements along the railways lines in the district unless they carried NDH forces. In response, the Italians allowed the Serbs to conduct their own Serbian Orthodox religious services in the town. This action by Dalmazzo at Knin formed part of a wider pattern of the Italians attempting to expand their influence into the NDH at the expense of the Zagreb government. This was done by aligning their occupation policies with the demands of the Serb nationalists, with a view to getting the refugees to return to their towns and villages and thereby avoid having to fight the rebel groups themselves.

On 2 August, Tenente (Lieutenant) Emilio Creolli reported to Orazi that the Serb nationalists had met at Benkovac as arranged by Orazi, and agreed to return to their home towns and work together with the Italians to unite the Gračac and Knin districts of the NDH with the Italian Governorate of Dalmatia, those parts of Dalmatia already annexed by the Italians, because such a common policy would thwart the communist-led insurgency. Đujić, Rađenović and the others were also promised financial and material assistance, with the details to be determined between the Governor of Dalmatia Giuseppe Bastianini and Orazi.

In August 1941, the KPJ commissar for Lika district, Gojko Polovina, reported that "Greater Serbia" elements within the uprising were attempting to come to an accommodation with the NDH government using Rađenović's contacts. According to the Partisan leader Kosta Nađ, Rađenović had been on friendly terms with the NDH Minister of the Interior Andrija Artuković for more than 30 years, and had played a role in helping Artuković to escape Yugoslavia in the aftermath of the 1932 Velebit uprising.

== Collaboration with the Italians ==
By mid-January 1942, the Italians had come to an understanding with several Chetnik leaders to keep them on friendly terms and for parallel or combined operations against the Partisans. The first Chetnik leader to do so was Rađenović. Along with Đujić, Rađenović socialised on a daily basis with an Italian Carabinieri colonel.
