= Rađenović =

Rađenović (Serbian Cyrillic: Рађеновић) is a Serbian surname, a patronymic derived from Slavic given name Rađen. It may refer to:

- Vuk Rađenović (born 1983), Germany-resident Serbian bobsledder
- Dejan Rađenović (born 1975), Serbian footballer
- Zdravko Rađenović (born 1952), retired Yugoslav and Serbian handballer
- Goran Rađenović (born 1966), retired Yugoslav and Serbian water polo player
- Stevo Rađenović, Croatian Serb politician and Chetnik leader
