= Anti-Fascist Struggle Day =

Croatian public holiday on 22 June

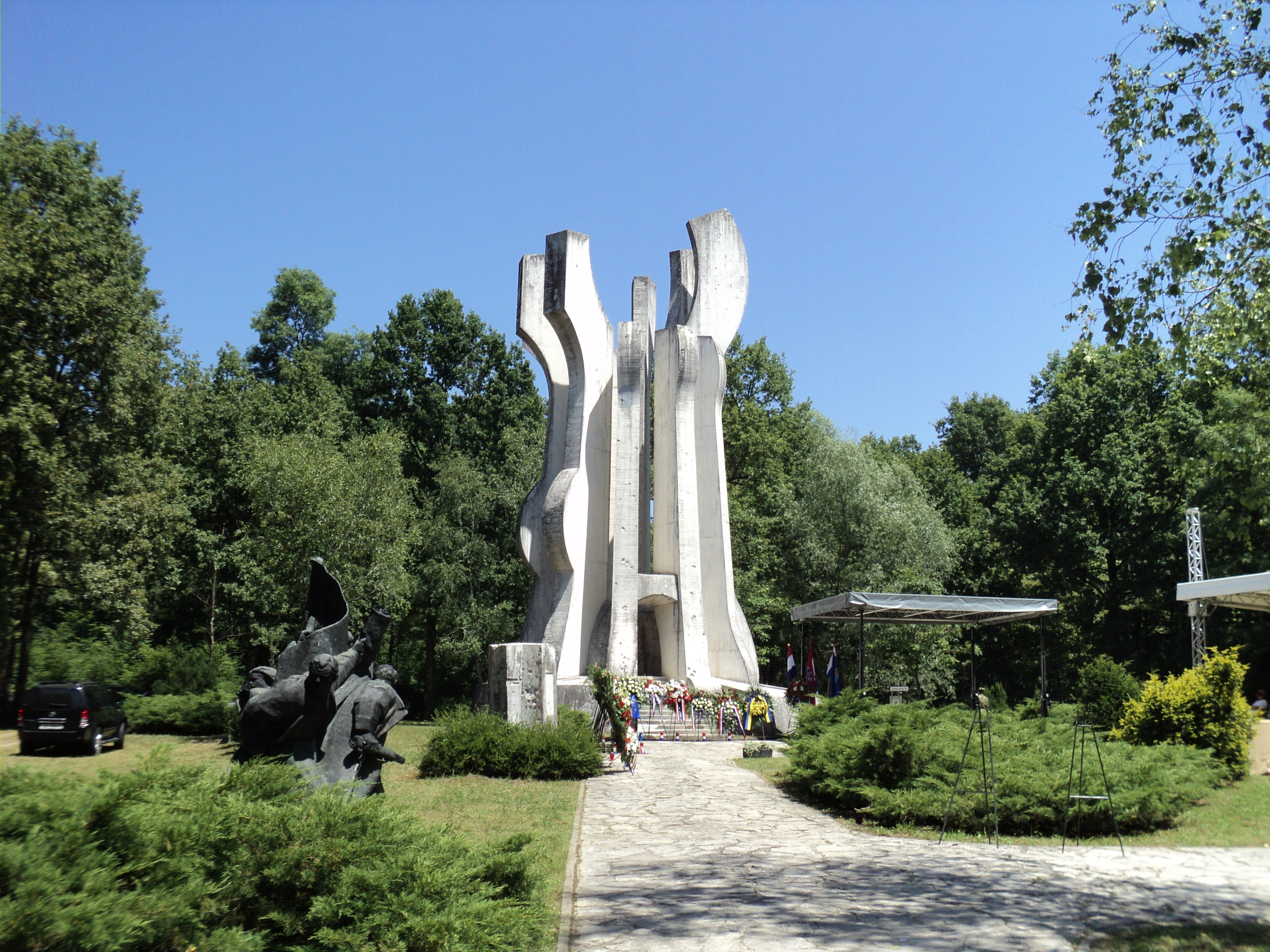
- A monument dedicated to the formation of the First Sisak Partisan Detachment in Brezovica Memorial Park.
- Observed by: Croatia
- Type: National
- Date: 22 June
- Next time: 22 June 2027
- Frequency: annual

Anti-Fascist Struggle Day (Croatian: Dan antifašističke borbe) is a public holiday in Croatia. It is observed on 22 June and commemorates the formation of the First Sisak Partisan Detachment, a Communist-led guerrilla unit during World War II in Yugoslavia on 22 June 1941, and in general the uprising of the anti-fascist Croatian wing of the Yugoslav Partisans against the forces of Nazi Germany, Fascist Italy and their puppet state―Independent State of Croatia.

The Kingdom of Yugoslavia had been routed and occupied by Germany and Italy in mid-April 1941, and on 22 June, when Germany attacked the Soviet Union, the Communist Party of Yugoslavia (CPY) received orders from the Moscow-based Comintern to come to the Soviet Union's aid.

The public holiday was introduced by the Croatian Parliament in 1991. It replaced a similar commemoration on 27 July, the "Day of the Uprising of the People of Croatia", that had been an official holiday in the Socialist Republic of Croatia and alluded to the Srb uprising. The Srb uprising, alongside the Anti-Fascist Struggle Day, is still commemorated today by antifascist organizations and representatives of minority communities which were the target of persecution during World War II, albeit not as much as the official holiday.

== See also ==
- Public holidays in Croatia
- History of Croatia § World War II and the Independent State of Croatia (1941–1945)
