= Croatian Partisans =

Guerrilla force in WWII Yugoslavia

National Liberation Movement in Croatia
- Flag of the Croatian Partisans
- Leaders: Andrija Hebrang; Vladimir Nazor
- Dates active: 1941–1945
- Allegiance: Communist Party of Croatia (KPH); Communist Party of Yugoslavia (KPJ)
- Active regions: Independent State of Croatia
- Ideology: Anti-fascism; Anti-nationalism; Communism; Federalism; National liberation; Republicanism
- Size: late 1941: 7,000; late 1942: 48,000; September 1943: 78,000; late 1943: 122,000; late 1944: 150,000; Croatian Government: 230,000
- Part of: Yugoslav Partisans
- Wars: the National Liberation War

The Croatian Partisans, officially the National Liberation Movement in Croatia (Croatian: Narodnooslobodilački pokret u Hrvatskoj; NOP), were part of the anti-fascist National Liberational Movement in the Axis-occupied Yugoslavia which was "perhaps Europe's most effective anti-Nazi resistance movement". It was led by Yugoslav revolutionary communists during the World War II. NOP was under the leadership of the League of Communists of Yugoslavia (KPJ) and supported by many others, with Croatian Peasant Party members contributing to it significantly. NOP units were able to temporarily or permanently liberate large parts of Croatia from occupying forces. Based on the NOP, the Federal Republic of Croatia was founded as a constituent of the Democratic Federal Yugoslavia.

== Background ==
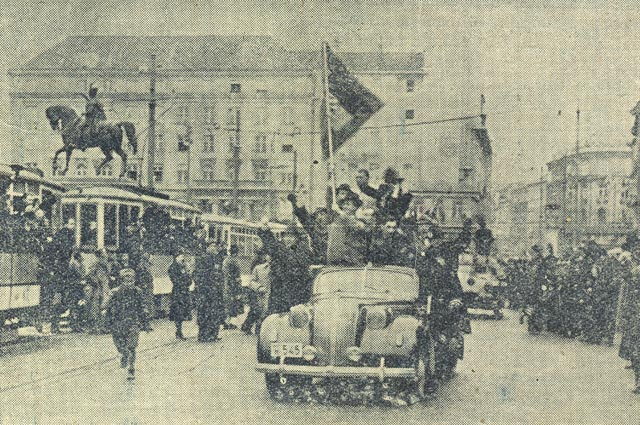
A group of Ustashe celebrating the establishment of NDH at the Zagreb's Ban Jelačić Square on 10 April 1941

In April 1941, the Croatian people found itself once again in a position of solving the issue of Croatian survival in the swirling of international warfare. Vladko Maček, leader of HSS and at the time de facto political leader of Croats, estimated that the Croatian state had no real possibility for surviving as part of Nazi Germany's war reconstruction of Europe so he refused to declare an independent Croatian state within the Axis system. Convinced that the Axis powers would lose the war and that their totalitarian system was not aligned with HSS's ideas of liberal democracy and peacemaking, Maček tried in all ways, including entering the Yugoslav government-in-exile, to preserve the changes that had been made within the Kingdom of Yugoslavia and to protect the Croatian people from bloodshed. However, when the war reached Croatian territory, prevented by Ustashe police control, Maček opted for a policy of waiting to see how the things would turn, left the political scene and handed it over to the Ustaše and the Communists.

Nazi-puppet state, Independent State of Croatia (NDH) proclaimed by Slavko Kvaternik in the name of Ustaša leader Ante Pavelić on 10 April 1941 appeared as a discontinuity in relation towards the approximation of the basic line of Croatian political orientation and a failure of the aspiration of the Croatian people to have an independent state because NDH's existence was directly linked to the will and destiny of Nazi Germany. The borders of NDH included Bosnia and Herzegovina and parts of Syrmia, but not Međimurje, Istria and large parts of Dalmatia (which were given to Italy with 1941 Treaties of Rome). With Treaties of Rome, NDH was proclaimed the kingdom, and the crown was offered to a member of the Italian ruling dynasty, Prince Aimone, Duke of Aosta as Tomislav II. NDH's constitution was based on a totalitarian ideology that developed under the influence of Nazism and Fascism.

Racial laws were soon enacted and the Ustaše targeted Serbs, Roma and Jews for extermination. Anti-fascist Croats were also persecuted by the regime. Dissatisfaction of the Croatian people with Ustaše rule started almost immediately with the beginning of these persecutions.

The NDH was not truly independent in relation towards German and Italian occupation authorities and with large parts of its territory being controlled by Chetniks (parts of Dalmatian Hinterland, Lika, Bosnia and others) and growing Partisan movement. The significance of the regime and the German and Italian influence did not leave much room for independent activity in any area of social life. With the Lorković–Vokić plot in summer of 1944, high-ranking Ustasha officials unsuccessfully tried to preserve NDH by taking power and switching sides to the Allies.

== History ==
Communist activity was aimed at preserving Yugoslavia and its transformation into a federal multiethnic communist state. That is why the KPJ's (in which KPH was active as a special organization since 1937) basic political position was the gathering of all political groups and people ready to provide resistance to the occupying forces and collaborators. In Croatian territories, that meant primarily to win over the Croatian population that had until then followed the HSS and to stop the strengthening of the Chetnik movement among the Serbian population and eventually unite them into a broad anti-fascist movement.

=== The Beginning of the Uprising ===
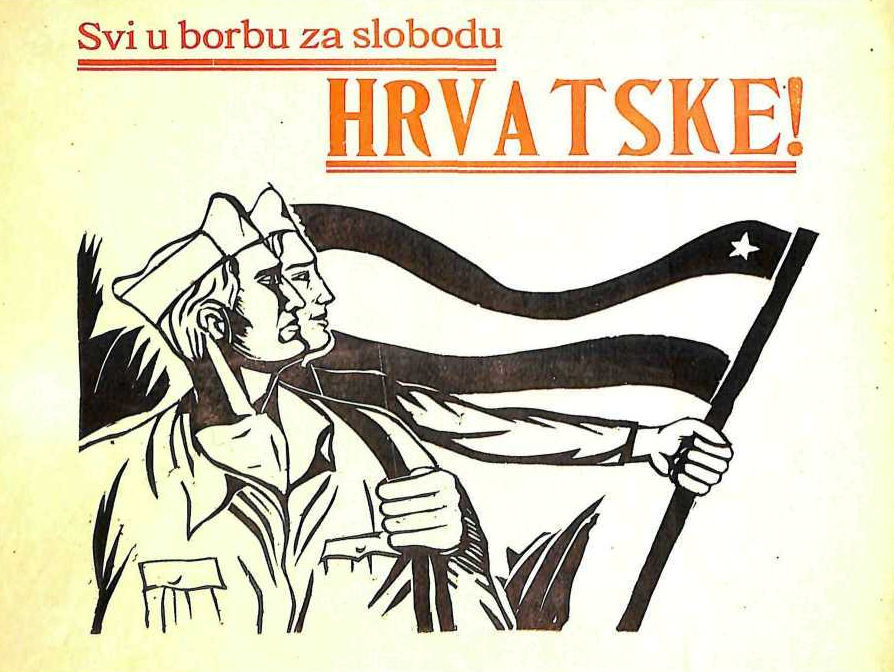
Partisan poster: "All in the fight for a free Croatia!" (1941)

First Partisan Anti-fascist Resistance Unit in occupied Yugoslavia was founded by a group of Croats and one notable Serb woman, Nada Dimić, in the forest of Žabno near Sisak on 22 June 1941 under the leadership of Vlado Janić-Capo. Partisans in Croatia wore three-cornered caps like International Brigades in the Spanish Civil War, called Triglavka. Their goal was, first and foremost, to liberate Croatia from the German and Italian occupation and terror which was conducted by the Ustaše regime against Jews, Romanis, Serbs, Croats and others who did not accept their principles. Soon afterward, Croatian partisans founded a Main Staff of the Croatian Partisans (Croatian: Glavni štab NOV i PO Hrvatske) led by Andrija Hebrang which was a part of the Supreme Staff of the Yugoslav Partisans under the command of Josip Broz Tito. Of all the other main staffs in the territory of Yugoslavia, Croatian was the strongest and most developed operational-territorial body of the Partisan forces, both in terms of the number of staff and the duties that it had. Following the unsuccessful uprising in Serbia in 1941, the center of gravity for the resistance moved to Bosnia and Herzegovina and Croatia.

On April 13, 1941, Winston Churchill sent his greetings to the Yugoslav people. In his greeting he stated:

You are making a heroic resistance against formidable odds and in doing so you are proving true to your great traditions. Serbs, we know you. You were our allies in the last war and your armies are covered with glory. Croats and Slovenes, we know your military history. For centuries you were the bulwark of Christianity. Your fame as warriors spread far and wide on the Continent. One of the finest incidents in the history of Croatia is the one when, in the 16th Century, long before the French Revolution, the peasants rose to defend the rights of man, and fought for those principles which centuries later gave the world democracy. Yugoslavs, you are fighting for those principles today. The British Empire is fighting with you, and behind us is the great democracy of the U.S.A., with its vast and ever-increasing resources. However hard the fight, our victory is assured.

— Winston Churchill

Partisan warfare was effective in the early period of war - avoiding a direct conflict with much stronger military force, using tactics of guerrilla warfare, sabotage, and propaganda. With sudden attacks on the traffic infrastructure and ambushes, they have successfully hindered the main supply of the German army, as well as the overall NDH's functioning.

=== Turning point ===
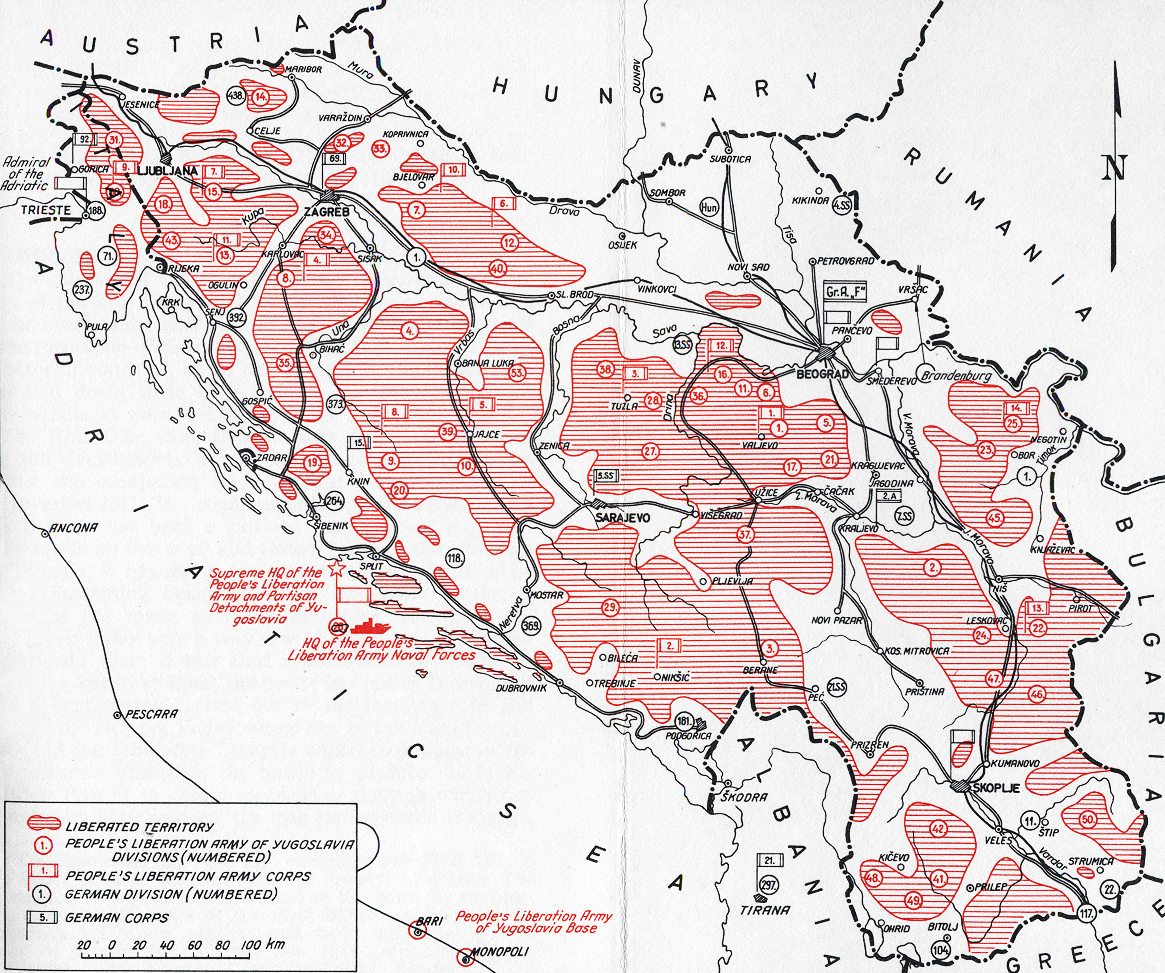
Map of Yugoslavia from 1944 with liberated territories marked in red

With Germany's weakening and the Italian surrender, the movement grew in power and got statehood attributes with the foundation of the State Anti-fascist Council for the National Liberation of Croatia (ZAVNOH), led by Croatian poet Vladimir Nazor, which acted as the highest political representative body of the anti-Fascist movement in Croatia. Just like a real war government, ZAVNOH coordinated Partisan military operations and organized economic activities in the liberated territories.

In the general warfare of the anti-Hitler coalition, partisan movement in the Yugoslav territory, primarily Croatia and Bosnia and Herzegovina, whose members, after the capitulation of Italy, disarmed a large number of Italian divisions and liberated large parts of Istria, Dalmatia and Bosnia and Herzegovina, played a significant role during 1943.

In the second half of 1943, the Partisans strengthened numerically and created more mobile combat units - the brigades, and gained control over larger territory. With the surrender of Italy and the withdrawal of the remaining Italian soldiers, Partisans acquired a lot of military equipment and materials. Apart from the fact that the population of the former occupied Italian territories was more massively enrolled in the NOP, some Italian volunteers also joined. With more troops and equipment, Partisan brigades gradually developed into a well-coordinated military force, using more direct methods of conflict, so that the NDH government's control, in reality, came down to larger cities and communication lines.

Thanks to military success, at the Second Session of Anti-Fascist Council for the National Liberation of Yugoslavia (AVNOJ) held on 29 November 1943 in Jajce, a new Yugoslavia was established "as a state union of equal peoples", which would ensure full equality of Croats, Macedonians, Montenegrins, Serbs and Slovenians, that is, of Federal Republics of Bosnia and Herzegovina, Croatia, Macedonia, Montenegro, Serbia and Slovenia.

At the 1943 Tehran Conference, Allied powers decided that they would start supporting NOP so they withdrew support for the Draža Mihailović's Chetniks. Allies established a military mission at the Supreme Staff of the National Liberation Army which was led by Josip Broz Tito. The situation further improved for the Partisans in 1944 as it became obvious that Axis powers would lose the war. Croatian Home Guard's soldiers began joining partisans in large numbers.

The rebellion in the French town of Villefranche-de-Rouergue was incited by Croatian and Bosnian conscripts to German divisions in September 1943, with the aim of joining the French Resistance. Although the Nazis brutally crushed the rebellion, Radio London declared Villefranche-de-Rouergue the first town in Western Europe to be liberated from Nazi occupation. In memory of the uprising, there is a memorial park in the town, and town's sole avenue is named Avenue des Croates [Avenue of the Croats].

== Federal State of Croatia ==
Emblem of the Federal State of Croatia, 1943

Flag of the Federal State of Croatia, 1945

=== The Final Stage of the War ===
In mid-1944, when the final stage of the war began, there were about 110,000 partisans in Croatia divided in five corps. The military campaign was led by the Main Staff of Croatia. The KPJ/KPH tried to impose and preserve the leading position, determine the political and military goals of the anti-fascist struggle, expel all other political factors and maintain the continuity of Yugoslavia's existence with the change of the essential elements of its internal structure. The continuity of the Yugoslav state was accepted, and at the same time, the internal discontinuity was confirmed, especially with regard to social and class determinations and their formation in accordance with communist conceptions. That is why the war itself was multi-layered: liberational, civil and revolutionary. The war ended in the Croatian territories with the military defeat of the NDH in May 1945 which was followed by the establishment of a highly centralized Communist regime in Belgrade which controlled Croatia until 1991 when Croatia declared independence.

In the final offensive for the liberation of Yugoslavia, from Croatia was engaged 165,000 soldiers mostly for the liberation of Croatia. On Croatian territory after 30 November 1944 in combat with the enemy participated 5 corps, 15 divisions, 54 brigades and 35 Partisan detachments, a total of 121,341 soldiers (117,112 men and 4239 woman) which at the end of 1944 made up about third of the entire armed forces of the National Liberation Army of Yugoslavia. At the same time, on the territory of Croatia there was 340,000 of German soldiers, 150,000 of Ustasha and Home Guard soldiers while the Chetniks at beginning of 1945 withdrew towards Slovenia. According to the ethnic composition of Partisans, most were Croats 73,327 or 60.40%, followed by Serbs 34,753 or 28.64%, Muslims 3,316 or 2.75%, Jews 284 or 0.25% and Slovenes, Montenegrins and others with 9,671 or 7.96%, (number of Partisans and ethnic composition does not include 9 brigades which were engaged outside of Croatia).

In military operations in the Croatian and Slovene territories conducted in March 1945, the Partisans broke through the German front in Lika, and parallel to the Danube river, the Syrmia Battlefield. By the beginning of May 1945, they successfully completed the Rijeka campaign (16 April to 6 May 1945), liberated Istria and the Slovene Littoral up to Soča where they met with allied forces, who after liberating Bologna on 19 April penetrated through northern Italy to Austria and the Soča. By 15 May 1945, Partisan units liberated the entire Slovene territory and penetrated the Italian and Austrian territories, where a large part of the NDH's Armed Forces along with a part of NDH's political leadership surrendered to them on Bleiburg on 15 May 1945.

=== National Liberation Committees ===
Thanks to their significant strength, Croatian Partisans managed to establish organs of power on the liberated parts of Croatia they controlled. First National Liberation Committees (Croatian: Narodnooslobodilački odbori, NOO) were established in 1941 as a support for the partisan units and political authorities that served as a substitute for a dysfunctional (Yugoslav) system of local government. They were electoral bodies that adopted general normative acts and had a judicial and executive functions.

Political bodies were soon created at higher levels. Anti-Fascist Council for the National Liberation of Yugoslavia (AVNOJ) was established in November 1942. Initiative Committee for the Establishment of ZAVNOH was created in the summer of 1943 as the political representative body of the National Liberation Movement in Croatia and Croatian people. At its three sessions, ZAVNOH made fundamental decisions about the federal arrangement of the future country, as well as the crucial decision on the annexation of all occupied (Croatian) territories with Croatia, thus opening the path of Croatian statehood and its territorial integrity.

The structure of the Federal Republic of Croatia developed within the National Liberation Movement, in the "from bottom to the top" model, which meant that the lower bodies were developed first, which culminated with the creation of ZAVNOH. At the end of 1941, there were 677 different NOOs, in 1942 1609, and at the end of 1943 4596. Of these 4596 NOOs, 1147 were active in the Zagreb area, 703 in Dalmatia, 699 in Slavonia, 491 in Istria, 318 in Kordun, 278 in Lika, 266 in the Croatian Littoral, 247 in Banovina, 183 in Gorski Kotar, 178 in Pokuplje, and 86 in the Karlovac area.

=== ZAVNOH activities ===
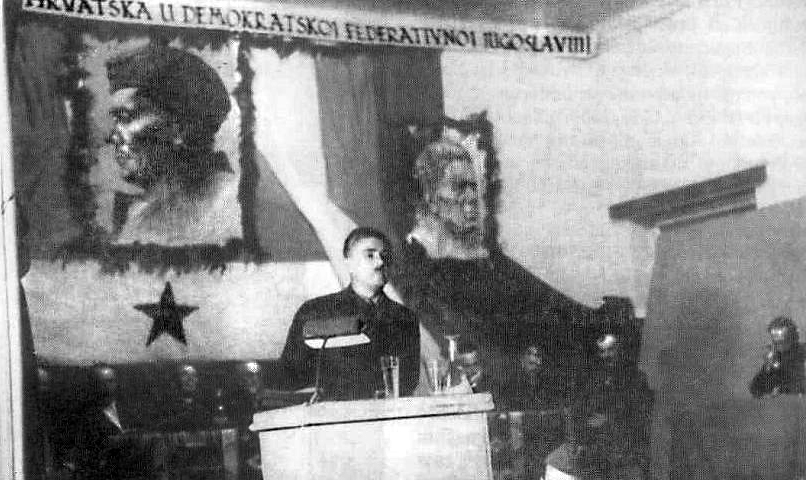
Andrija Hebrang speaks at the 3rd session of ZAVNOH, 1945

At the second AVNOJ conference, held between 29 and 30 November 1943, Josip Broz Tito declared AVNOJ to be the superior executive authority. The Conference's decisions to create a federal Yugoslavia, based on the right of self-determination of nations, in which the South Slavic peoples (Bosniaks, Croats, Macedonians, Montenegrins, Serbs and Slovenes) who would live in six constituent republics with equal rights represented a discontinuity with the changes initiated in the Kingdom of Yugoslavia by the creation of Banovina of Croatia. The leader of the Yugoslav government-in-exile Ivan Šubašić and head of the National Committee for the Liberation of Yugoslavia (NKOJ) Josip Broz Tito, concluded in June 1944 an agreement by which Šubašić accepted AVNOJ's reorganisation of the Kingdom of Yugoslavia.

Andrija Hebrang called the Croatian partisan state, which received its final form on the third session of ZAVNOH held between 8 and 9 May 1944 in Topusko, the "Free Federal State of Croatia". At this session, ZAVNOH revived the continuity of the Croatian Parliament which had been abolished in 1918.

During June 1944, the Croatian island of Vis became the military, political and diplomatic center of the National Liberation Movement. With the full liberation of Dalmatia during January 1945, ZAVNOH moved to Šibenik preparing for the takeover of authority over the whole of Croatia. Šibenik was the seat of ZAVNOH between 31 December 1944 and 13 May 1945. Accordingly, ZAVNOH decided to form the first Croatian National Government. At the extraordinary session of ZAVNOH's Presidency held on 14 April 1944 in Split, the National Government of the Federal Republic of Croatia was elected. The government was made of Prime Minister Vladimir Bakarić, vice-presidents and ministers. On 22 April 1945, the Government issued a special Declaration stating among other: "The creation of the first Croatian National Government during the National Liberation War against foreign occupation is a proof of the inalienable and long-neglected rights of the Croatian people for freedom and independence which is realized with unbeatable strength. As a result of the struggle of the Croatian people for freedom during the liberation war, its right to own government was realized."

On its fourth session, held between 24 and 25 July 1945 in the palace of the Croatian Parliament, ZAVNOH renamed itself the National Parliament of Croatia. President of the Presidency of the National Parliament of Croatia (Croatian head of state) Vladimir Nazor gave the mandate to form a new government to Vladimir Bakarić who proposed the creation of the multiparty government consisting of five members from the Croatian Peasant Party (Franjo Gaži, Tomo Čiković, Aleksandar Kohanović, Ante Vrkljan, Jurica Draušnik), four from the League of Communists of Croatia (Vladimir Bakarić, Vicko Krstulović, Anka Berus, Mladen Ivekovi), four from the Serbian Deputy Club (Rade Pribićević, Duško Brkić, Dušan Čalić, Stanko Ćanica-Opačić) and one "independent patriot" (Uliks Stanger).

The Presidency of the National Parliament of Croatia adopted on 26 February 1946 the "Act on the Name of the People's Republic of Croatia", and since then acted as a Presidium of the People's Republic of Croatia. The National Government was renamed the Government of the People's Republic of Croatia. The proportion of communists in the Presidium grew to 70%, and in the Government to 87%.

Between 26 and 30 August 1946, the fifth session of the Parliament, named the Parliament of the People's Republic of Croatia (since 18 January 1947, it was known as the Constitutional National Assembly of People's Republic of Croatia), was held. It promulgated the first Constitution of the People's Republic of Croatia on 18 January 1947.

The decisions of ZAVNOH had a crucial and far-reaching significance in the defense of Croatian statehood and constituted the constitutional-legal basis of the contemporary Republic of Croatia. Croatia has clearly stated in its constitution that its statehood during the Second World War was based on the national liberation struggle and ZAVNOH's decisions and on the creation of the Federal State of Croatia in opposition to the proclamation of the Independent State of Croatia (NDH).

== Composition and losses ==
First democratically elected Croatian President Franjo Tuđman (left) with writer Joža Horvat in February 1945

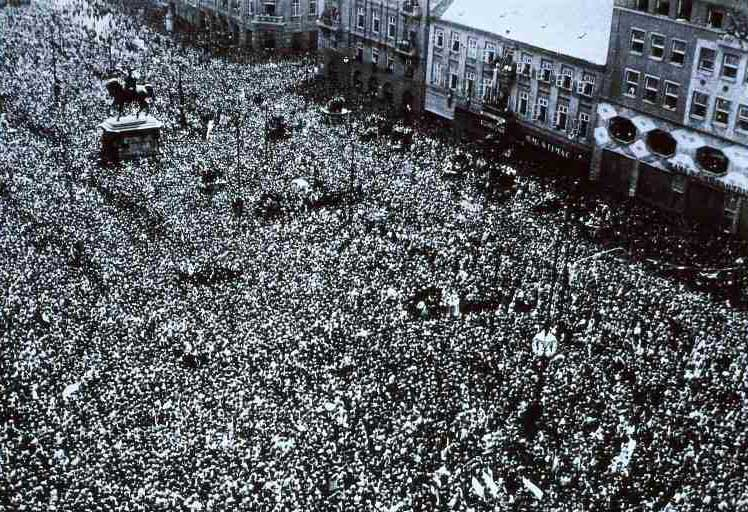
People of Zagreb celebrating liberation from Axis powers on 12 May 1945

Although in 1941 and 1942 most of the Croatian partisans were ethnic Serbs, by October 1943 most were ethnic Croats. This was the result of the transition of the HSS leadership to the partisans in June 1943, especially of Božidar Magovac, as well as the momentum following the capitulation of Italy. As gradually the People's Liberation Movement became more popular, by the end of 1943, more Croats joined. Statistics show that by the end of 1944 Croats accounted for 61% of the Partisan forces in Croatia in contrast to Serbs who made up 28%. The process was accelerated by the Partisan's offer of general amnesty from 15 September 1944 to anyone who joined them. Only in the period between 1 and 15 September 1944, 245 Croatian Home Guard soldiers with full weapons joined the Eastern Group of Partisan Detachments in the vicinity of Bjelovar.

An anti-fascist movement in the form of armed struggle developed in Croatia as nowhere in Europe, and since the formation of the Sisak Partisan Detachment on 22 June 1941, composed almost exclusively of Croats, at the end of 1941 it counted about 7,000 fighters. At the beginning of 1942, Croatian Main Staff split the battlefield into 5 zones with 5 corpses composed of 2 to 4 divisions with 110,000 fighters. By the end of 1944, the number of Croatian partisans grew to around 150,000. League of Communists of Yugoslavia and its Croatian affiliate tried to impose and preserve the leading position and determine the political and military goals of anti-fascist struggle, and exclude all other political factors.

Croatian Partisans were key to National Liberation Army; by the end of 1943, Croatia, which accounted for 24% of the Yugoslav population, gave more Partisans than Serbia, Montenegro, Slovenia and Macedonia combined. Croatian Partisans were a unique resistance movement in Europe by the number of Jews in their ranks.

According to Ivo Goldstein, at the end of 1941, 77% of the Croatian partisans were ethnic Serbs and 21.5% ethnic Croats. By August 1942, the share of Croats increased to 32%, and by September 1943 to 34%. After the capitulation of Italy, the number of Croats within the Partisan ranks continued to grow rapidly, and by the beginning of 1944, 60,4% were Croats, 28,6% Serbs, 2,8% Bosniaks and 8,2% others (Slovenes, Jews, Montenegrins, Italians, Czechs and Volksdeutsches).

In regard to the number of inhabitants, Croatia had the biggest resistance movement out of all Yugoslav republics and was submitted relatively to the largest number of victims. 70% of the fighters were younger than 25. Croatia had 251 Partisan detachments, 78 brigades, and 17 divisions. Out of 7 corpses, 5 were Croatian with a total of 200,000 Croatian fighters who have fought against about half a million German, Ustasha and Chetnik forces in the last five months of the war. Out of 206,000 killed partisans, 64,000 were Croatian.

In addition, in the immediate postwar period, a number of Partisan units engaged in mass murder against prisoners of war and others perceived Axis sympathizers and collaborators with their relatives, children including. The infamous carnages include the Bleiburg repatriations, the Foibe massacres, Tezno massacre, Macelj massacre, Kočevski Rog massacre and Barbara Pit massacre. The most likely number of Croats killed by the Partisans in the post-war period is around 60,000.

== Notable Croatian partisans ==
- Josip Broz Tito (1892–1980), commander of the Yugoslav Partisans and president of SFR Yugoslavia
- Franjo Tuđman (1922–1999), intelligence officer of the 10th Zagreb Corps and first democratically elected President of Croatia
- Andrija Hebrang (1899–1949), 4th Secretary of the Central Committee of the Communist Party of Croatia
- Sveto Letica (1926–2001), one of the founders of the Yugoslav Navy and first commander of the Croatian Navy
- Janko Bobetko (1919–2003), member of the First Sisak Partisan Detachment, General-Major in the Yugoslav People's Army and Chief of the Main Staff of the Croatian Armed Forces
- Anton Tus (1931–2023), Lieutenant-General of the Yugoslav People's Army, commander of the Croatian Air Force and Air Defence, first Chief of the Main Staff of the Croatian Armed Forces and Chief Military Advisor to the Croatian President
- Stjepan Filipović (1916–1942), author of the partisan slogan Death to fascism, freedom to the people
- Većeslav Holjevac (1917–1970), political commissioner of the IV partisan corps and Mayor of Zagreb
- Franjo Kluz (1913–1944), founder of the Partisan Air Force
- Rade Končar (1911–1942), People's Hero of Yugoslavia; KONČAR Group was named after him
- Ivan Goran Kovačić (1913–1943), poet
- Josip Kraš (1900–1941), trade unionist and Communist Party's official; Kraš company was named after him
- Vladimir Nazor (1876–1949), President of ZAVNOH and the first President of Croatia
- Ivan Ribar (1881–1968), President of AVNOJ and President of the Presidency of the National Assembly of Yugoslavia
- Ivo Lola Ribar (1916–1943), politician
- Velimir Škorpik (1919–1943), First Commander of the Partisan Navy
- Vladimir Bakarić (1912–1983) Yugoslav and Croatian communist revolutionary

== See also ==
- World War II in Yugoslavia
- Yugoslav Partisans
- Sisak People's Liberation Partisan Detachment
- History of Croatia
- Timeline of Croatian history

== Bibliography ==
- Tomasevich, Jozo (2001). War and Revolution in Yugoslavia, 1941–1945: Occupation and Collaboration. Stanford: Stanford University Press. ISBN 978-0-8047-7924-1.
- Davidson, Basil (1946). Partisan Picture. Bedford Books. ISBN 0900406003. OCLC 2019137.
