= Srb uprising =

1941 rebellion in Croatia

- Part of World War II in Yugoslavia
Date	27 July – September 1941
Location	Lika and western Bosnia, Independent State of Croatia 44.371355°N 16.125526°E
Result	Croatian failure to suppress the uprising

Belligerents
Yugoslav Partisans; Chetniks; Kingdom of Italy	Independent State of Croatia

Commanders and leaders
(Yugoslav Partisans) Stojan Matić; (Yugoslav Partisans) Đoko Jovanić; (Yugoslav Partisans) Gojko Polovina; (Chetniks) Boško Rašeta; (Chetniks) Stevo Rađenović; (Chetniks) Pero Đilas; (Chetniks) Dane Stanisavljević; (Kingdom of Italy) Renzo Dalmazzo	(Independent State of Croatia) Mihajlo Lukić; (Independent State of Croatia) Vladimir Veber
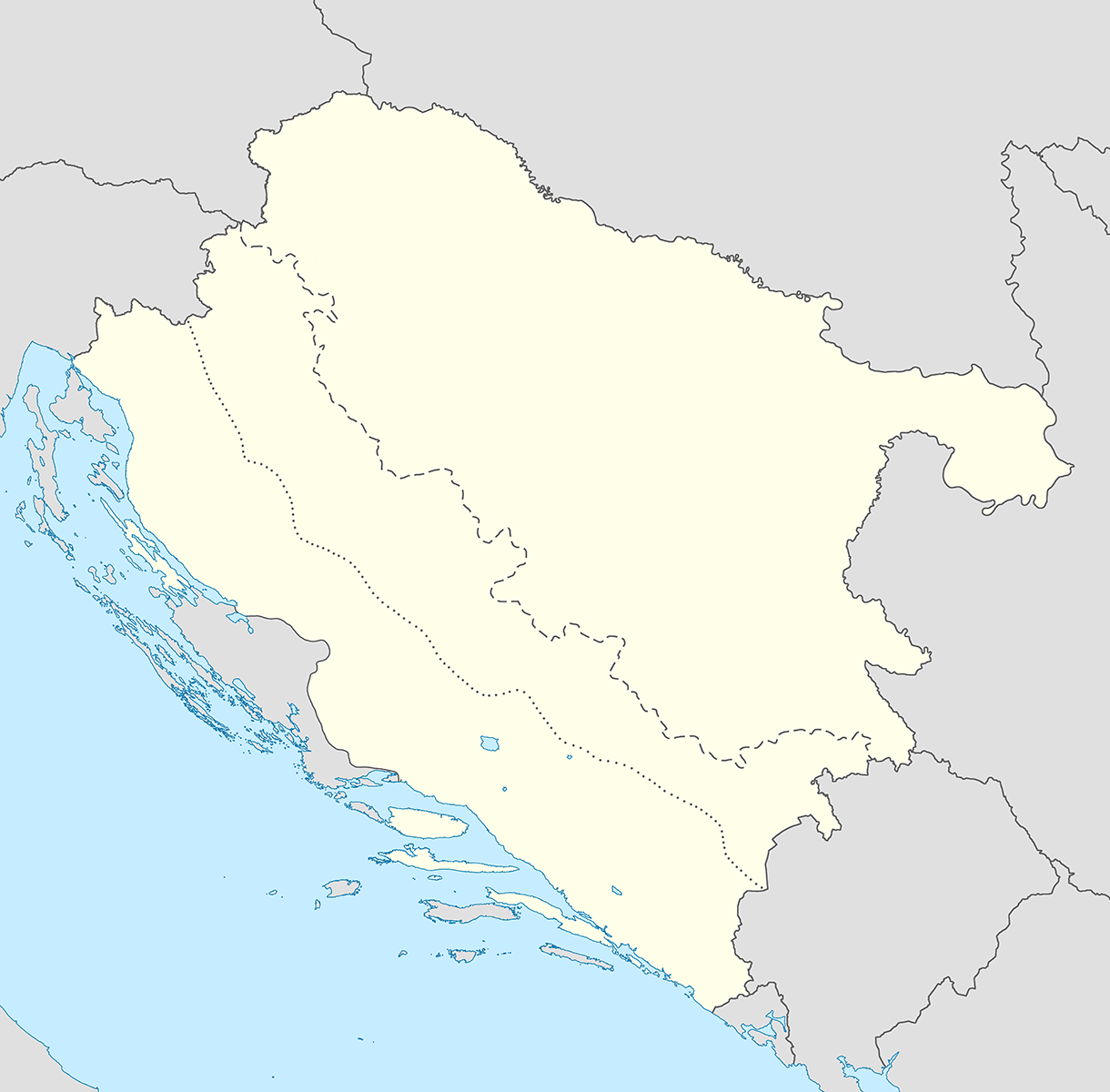
- Location of the village of Srb in Lika

The Srb uprising (Serbo-Croatian: Устанак у Србу, Ustanak u Srbu) was a rebellion against the Independent State of Croatia (Croatian: Nezavisna Država Hrvatska, NDH) that began on 27 July 1941 in Srb, a village in the region of Lika. The uprising was started by the local population as a response to persecutions of Serbs by the Ustaše and was led by Chetniks and Yugoslav Partisans. It soon spread across Lika and Bosanska Krajina. During the uprising numerous war crimes were committed against local Croat and Muslim population, especially in the area of Kulen Vakuf. As NDH forces lacked the strength to suppress the uprising, the Italian Army, which was not a target of the rebels, expanded its zone of influence to Lika and parts of Bosanska Krajina.

Until 1991, 27 July was a national holiday in the Socialist Republic of Croatia called "Uprising Day of the People of Croatia". After the independence of Croatia, 22 June was chosen instead as the Anti-Fascist Struggle Day and a national holiday, commemorating the earlier creation and resistance activity of the 1st Sisak Partisan Detachment.

== Background ==
On 6 April 1941, the German Reich invaded the Kingdom of Yugoslavia. During the Invasion of Yugoslavia, Ustaše, a Croat fascist and ultranationalist organization aboard, proclaimed the Independent State of Croatia (NDH) on 10 April 1941, supported by Germany and Italy. By May 1941, the Ustaše formed the Jadovno concentration camp in Lika where they incarcerated and executed thousands of ethnic Serbs and other prisoners, which led to the rebellion. The Serbs were the majority in the Croatian Partisans until September 1943, and were absolute majority in the Yugoslav Army in the Fatherland, better known as Chetniks.

Large scale persecutions in the area started in June 1941, including ethnic cleansing of around 1,200 Serbs who were expelled to occupied Serbia by Vjekoslav "Maks" Luburić, whereas in the municipality of Srb, days ahead of the rebellion, Luburić's Ustaše forces murdered 279 Serb civilians in the villages of Suvaja, Osredak and Bubanj.

== Prelude ==
In June 1941, the Serbs started an uprising in eastern Herzegovina. The uprising was suppressed in early July, but peace was not established. NDH systematically persecuted the Serbian and Jewish populations throughout the country. The Communists entered into open conflict with the regime after Germany invaded the Soviet Union on 22 June. However, they were not prepared for the July uprising nor did they order it. The rebellion was triggered by three individual rebels. On 26 July, a Home Guard officer was killed while driving from Drvar to Bosanski Petrovac. The NDH authorities then began arresting local peasants. Thus the local KPJ Committee was dragged into launching a full-scale rebellion.

== Rebellion ==
An uprising in Croatia and western Bosnia started on 27 July 1941 with Drvar uprising in the area of Drvar and Bosansko Grahovo in Bosnian Krajina. The uprising was nominally under the command of the local Communists. However, the Communists were few in numbers and a large number of insurgents were influenced by the Chetniks and local pre-war politicians that spread anti-Croat propaganda and advocated for a Greater Serbia. The rebel groups attacked NDH institutions and ambushed Ustaše and Home Guard forces sent as reinforcements. Although they were ideologically on different sides, the Chetniks and the Communists formed an alliance in order to balance against the increasing power of the Ustaše.

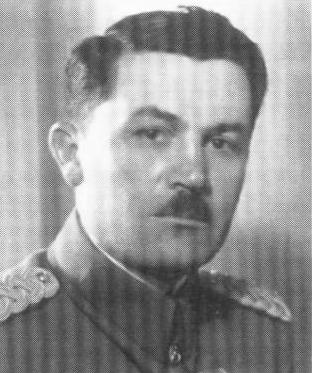
General Mihajlo Lukić, the commander of the Croatian Home Guard

On 27 July the Ustaše lost control of Drvar. In the village of Trubar near Drvar, a Roman Catholic priest, Waldemar Maximilian Nestor, and his parishioners were killed by the insurgents. The NDH forces encircled Drvar, but lacked the artillery to capture the town. Eight battalions and several batteries were sent from Zagreb to the Drvar area, where an estimated 4,000 armed insurgents were located.

On 28 July, in the village of Brotnja in the municipality of Srb, 37 civilians were killed and their houses were looted and destroyed by Chetniks. From 29 July to 2 August, the town of Gračac was under siege. Gračac was defended by Ustaše and Home Guard forces, in total about 2,000 soldiers. Actions by the insurgents jeopardized Donji Lapac, which the Ustaše had to leave. The rebels entered the village on 30 July without a fight. The Italian Army in the area was not a target of attacks, the insurgents even asked them for protection against the Ustaše. According to an Italian assessment, the uprising was primarily directed against the Ustaše regime, while the influence of the Communists had a secondary role.

On 2 August the rebels looted and burned the Croat village of Boričevac. The majority of the population, 2,180 people, fled to Kulen Vakuf, a large village near Drvar, before the insurgents entered. 55 remained in the village, mostly women and elderly, all of whom were killed. Kulen Vakuf, whose garrison was under the command of captain Vladimir Veber, was encircled by rebel forces.

Stevo Rađenović was labeled by the Italians as the political leader of the Serb resistance movement in Lika. The rebellion spread to North Dalmatia near the town of Knin, which was directly endangered. The command of the city was completely taken by the Italians. Reports from the Ustaše recorded their dissatisfaction with the actions of the Italians, indicating the Italian authorities were giving refuge and support to the Chetniks.

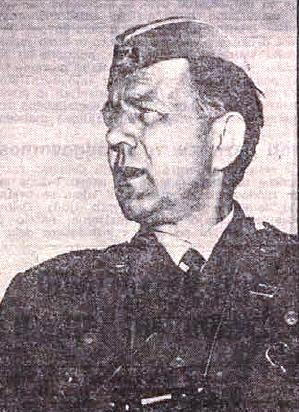
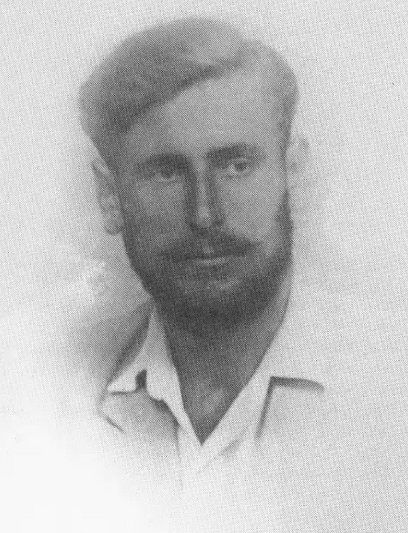
Left: Đoko Jovanić, one of the Partisan commanders
Right: Dane Stanisavljević, one of the Serb rebel commanders

General Mihajlo Lukić of the 3rd Lika Brigade was given the task of suppressing the uprising in Lika and the destruction of the rebel units. On 17 August 2 battalions and a battery of cannons, numbering about 1,300 men, started an attack in order to relief Kulen Vakuf and connect with forces coming from Gračac. The operation ran according to plans and in the first two days NDH forces managed to capture significant territory. On 19 August NDH troops reached Gornji Lapac where they found no resistance. A vanguard of the Ustaše and Home Guard troops, sent towards Boričevac, was ambushed and the offensive was halted. The rebels then strengthened their blockade of Kulen Vakuf and villages along the left bank of the Una River. On 4 September they attacked and destroyed the village of Ćukovi. Although the local Muslims were not members of the Ustaše, the village was captured to completely encircle Kulen Vakuf. Veber tried to break through from Kulen Vakuf to Bihać to evacuate the population during the night on 5–6 September. He had a Home Guard and Ustaše battalion and Muslim militia at his disposal. As the convoy left Kulen Vakuf, the rebels quickly crossed the Una and seized control of the village.

The rebels attacked the retreating column and killed around three hundred refugees. A percentage of the refugees managed to reach Bihać, but about a third were captured. Seventy were immediately killed and 400, mainly women and children, were returned in captivity to Kulen Vakuf and held at the police and railway stations. Another 900, also mostly women and children, were held in a meadow, while about 380 male captives were transferred to another village. A percentage of the prisoners held at the meadow were butchered by the rebels and locals. About 50 tried to escape, but were captured and killed, their bodies thrown into a pit. Then, the Communists and rebels opposing the killings of the captives intervened. Kulen Vakuf was burned to the ground.

The NDH lacked the forces to suppress the rebellion. The Germans could not divert their troops as all available forces were on the eastern front. The Italians, on the other hand, were able to provide assistance, but agreed to it only to strengthen their own influence over NDH. On 26 August 1941 the NDH government reached an agreement that the Italians re-occupy the 2nd and 3rd zones in order to pacify the insurgents in those areas. In late 1941 the Italians re-occupied several previously NDH-held towns in the Bosnian Krajina. In early October the Italian 5th Corps re-occupied Kulen Vakuf.

== Commemoration ==
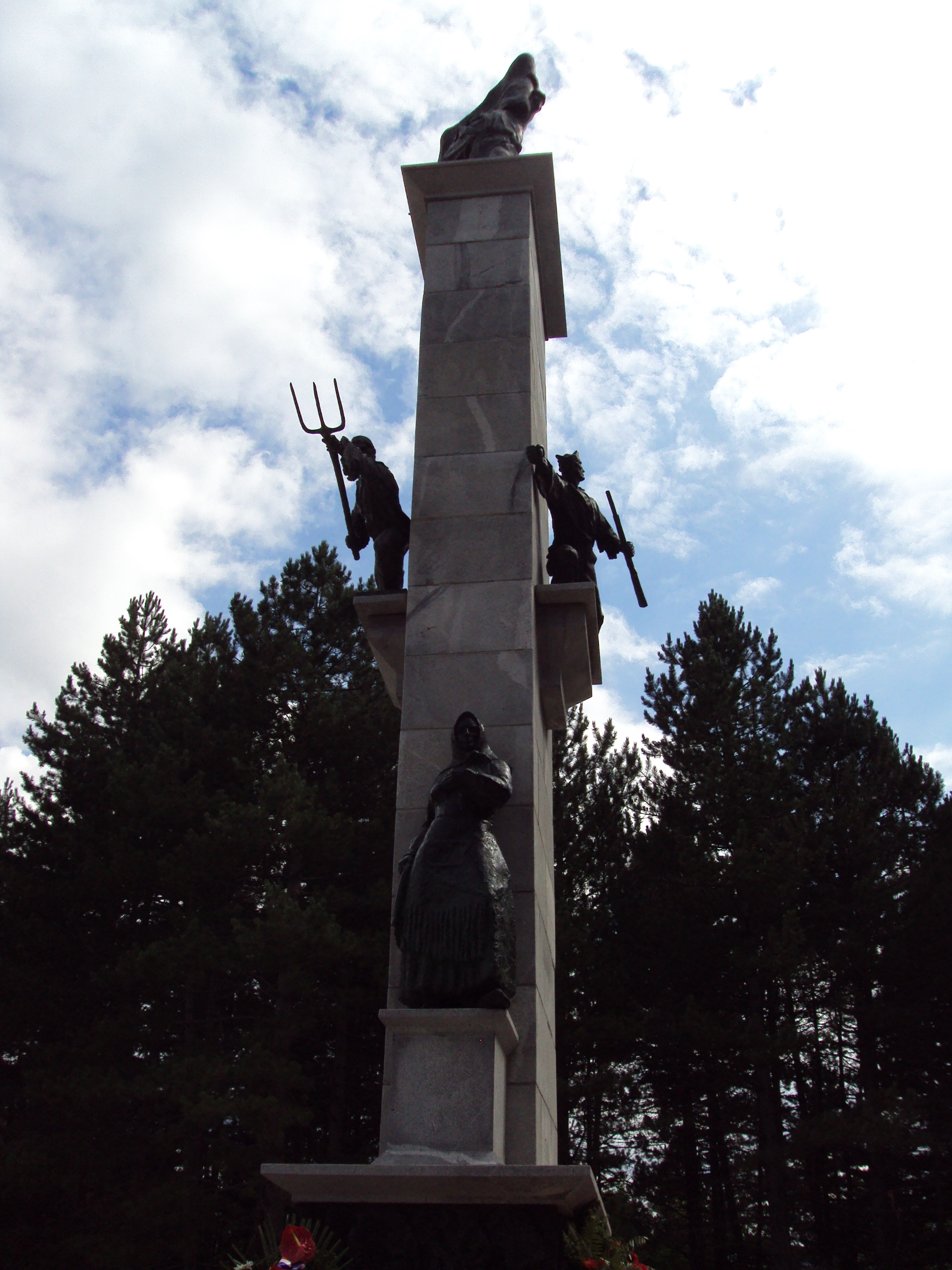
Monument to the Uprising of the people of Croatia in Srb

In the Socialist Republic of Croatia, the Srb uprising was commemorated as a national holiday, the "General People's Uprising Day in Croatia" (Dan općeg narodnog ustanka u Hrvatskoj) on 27 July after the proposal was accepted in 1945 by the ZAVNOH. Later the name "Uprising Day of the People of Croatia" (Dan ustanka naroda Hrvatske) became more prevalent in public. In 1991, after the collapse of the Communist regime, the new Croatian government replaced the former Uprising Day with the Anti-Fascist Struggle Day on 22 June, the date when in 1941 the Sisak People's Liberation Partisan Detachment was formed – the first Partisan unit in Croatia.

Nevertheless, several anti-fascist organizations and the Independent Democratic Serb Party (SDSS) continued to commemorate this date as the first day of an antifascist uprising. Right-wing organizations and parties such as the Autochthonous Croatian Party of Rights condemn the gathering, calling it a "historical forgery" and "celebration of genocide against Croats", and organize counter-protests against the commemoration year after year; the commemoration is secured by strong police forces.

Former president Stjepan Mesić was at the 2012 commemoration and called members of the counter-protests the "quasi-patriots". The commemoration had been attended by members of the state leadership until about 2012, but they later withdrew amidst the controversy.

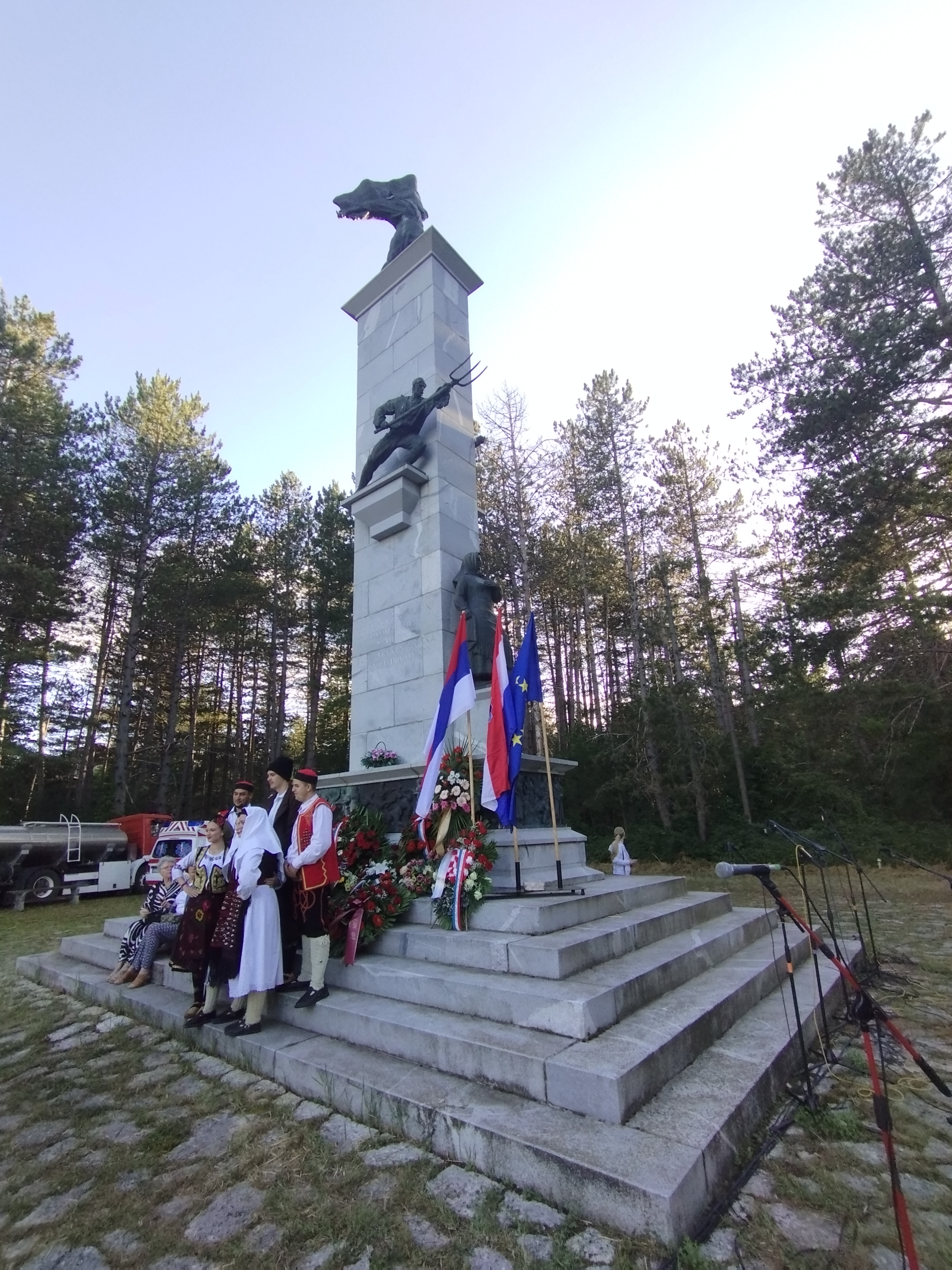
2025 commemoration

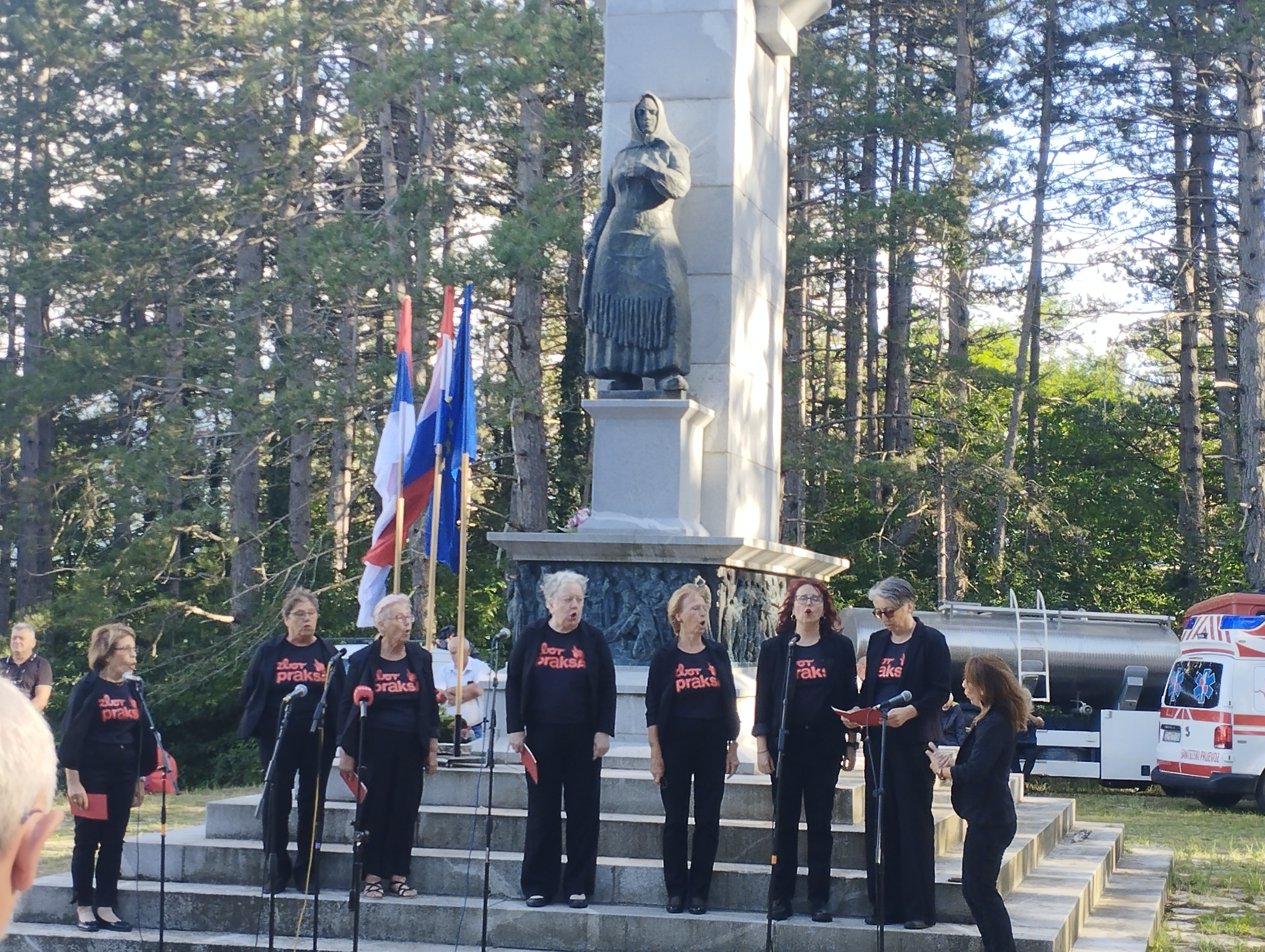
2025 commemoration

== See also ==
- Danilo Stanisavljević
- Pajica Omčikus
