= Vlado Janić =

Croatian and Yugoslav politician (1904–1991)

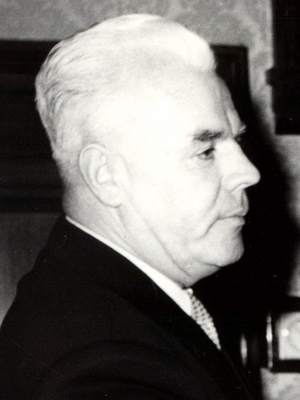
- Born: 14 July 1904; Sisak, Kingdom of Croatia-Slavonia, Austria-Hungary
- Died: 4 May 1991 (aged 86) Belgrade, SR Serbia, SFR Yugoslavia

Vlado Janić Capo (14 July 1904 – 4 May 1991) was a Croatian Partisan and the commander of the Sisak People's Liberation Partisan Detachment, the first anti-fascist resistance unit formed by a resistance movement in occupied Yugoslavia and Europe during World War II.

== Biography ==
Vlado Janić was born on 14 July 1904 in Sisak and he declared himself as Croat. His entire family participated in the labor movement and since 1941 in the People's Liberation War. His two brothers and father were executed, while his mother and sister were in the Jasenovac concentration camp.

At the end of the WWI and in the first years of Yugoslavia, he learned the locksmith trade at the fabric factory in Sisak. After that he was employed in the railway workshop in Sisak. In 1931, he was admitted to the Communist Party of Yugoslavia and he was arrested several times for party's work. From 1939 Janić was a member of the Communist Party of Croatia.

On 22 June 1941, Vlado Janić entered the People's Liberation War. The first Partisan unit in Croatia was organized under the leadership of Marijan Cvetković and Vlado Janić. At the end of September 1941, Sisak Partisan Detachment and several Banija Partisan units formed the Banija Partisan Detachment whose first commander was Vlado Janić. His other duties were: Commissar of the 12th Slavonian brigade, 28th Slavonian Division, 6th Slavonian Corps, and the People's Defence Corps of Yugoslavia.

After WWII, Vlado Janić had high functions in JNA. He lived in Belgrade where he died on 4 May 1991.

== Legacy ==
He was proclaimed a national hero of Yugoslavia on 20 December 1951.
