= Gornji Srb =

Gornji Srb Горњи Срб (Serbian)
- Village
- Location within Croatia
- Coordinates: 44°21′12″N 16°07′05″E
- Country: Croatia
- County: Zadar County
- Municipality: Gračac
- Elevation: 454 m (1,490 ft)
- Time zone: UTC+1 (CET)
  - Summer (DST): UTC+2 (CEST)
- Postal code: 23445 Srb
- Area code: +385 (23)

Gornji Srb (Serbian Cyrillic: Горњи Срб) is a village and former settlement in Croatia.

== Population ==
Until 2011 census, Gornji Srb was independent settlement. It was unified with settlement of Donji Srb in new settlement of Srb. As independent settlement it included hamlets of Gornji Srb, Nadurljaj, Podastrana and Podmeđeđak.

Population
1857	1869	1880	1890	1900	1910	1921	1931	1948	1953	1961	1971	1981	1991	2001
0	0	0	459	546	0	0	0	384	414	366	346	318	356	79

Note: Settlements of Donji Srb and Gornji Srb are administratively recognized as independent settlements in 1890 and 1900, and then from 1948 to 2001. From 1857 to 1880, and 1910 to 1931 it was part of that time independent settlement of Srb, for which data is include in former settlement of Donji Srb. In 2011, it finished its existence as independent settlement and became part of newformed settlement of Srb.

=== 1991 census ===
According to the 1991 census, settlement of Gornji Srb had 356 inhabitants, which were ethnically declared as this:

Gornji Srb
1991
Total: 356
1. Serbs 354 (99.4%)
2. Croats 1 (0.28%)
3. Germans 1 (0.28%)

=== Austro-Hungarian 1910 census ===
For the 1910 census data is include in former settlement of Donji Srb.

== Literature ==
- Savezni zavod za statistiku i evidenciju FNRJ i SFRJ, popis stanovništva 1948, 1953, 1961, 1971, 1981. i 1991. godine.
- Book: "Narodnosni i vjerski sastav stanovništva Hrvatske, 1880–1991: po naseljima, author: Jakov Gelo, izdavač: Državni zavod za statistiku Republike Hrvatske, 1998., ISBN 953-6667-07-X, ISBN 978-953-6667-07-9;
