= Donji Srb =

Donji Srb Доњи Срб (Serbian)
- Village
- Location within Croatia
- Coordinates: 44°22′11″N 16°07′30″E
- Country: Croatia
- County: Zadar County
- Municipality: Gračac
- Elevation: 434 m (1,424 ft)
- Time zone: UTC+1 (CET)
  - Summer (DST): UTC+2 (CEST)
- Postal code: 23445 Srb
- Area code: +385 (23)

Donji Srb (Serbian Cyrillic: Доњи Срб) is a village and former settlement in Croatia.

== Population ==
Till 2011 census, Donji Srb was independent settlement. It was unified with settlement of Gornji Srb in new settlement of Srb. As independent settlement it included hamlets of Ajderovac, Donji Srb, Kruškovača and Podastrana.

Population
1857	1869	1880	1890	1900	1910	1921	1931	1948	1953	1961	1971	1981	1991	2001
861	1,043	1,058	662	694	1,257	1,302	1,395	587	516	590	810	909	1,098	255

Note: Settlements of Donji Srb and Gornji Srb are administratively recognized as independent settlements in 1890 and 1900, and then from 1948-2001. From 1857-1880, and 1910-1931 it was part of that time independent settlement of Srb, for which it include data. In 2011 it finished its existence as independent settlement and became part of newformed settlement of Srb.

=== 1991 census ===
According to the 1991 census, settlement of Donji Srb had 1,098 inhabitants, which were ethnically declared as this:

Donji Srb
1991
total: 1,098
1. Serbs 1,059 (96.4%)
2. Croats 9 (0.81%)
3. Hungarians 6 (0.54%)
4. Montenegrins 6 (0.54%)
5. Muslims 6 (0.54%)
6. Yugoslavs 6 (0.54%)
7. Ukrainians 1 (0.09%)
8. unknown 5 (0.45%)

=== Austro-hungarian 1910 census ===
According to the 1910 census, settlement of Donji Srb had 1,257 inhabitants in 3 hamlets, which were linguistically and religiously declared as this:

Population by language	Croatian or Serbian
Ajderovac	152
Srb	1,085
Urljaj	20
Total	1,257 (100%)

Population by religion	Eastern Orthodox	Roman Catholics
Ajderovac	152	-
Srb	1,063	22
Urljaj	20	-
Total	1,235 (98.24%)	22 (1.75%)

Note: In 1910 census include data for former settlement of Gornji Srb.

== Literature ==
- Savezni zavod za statistiku i evidenciju FNRJ i SFRJ, popis stanovništva 1948, 1953, 1961, 1971, 1981. i 1991. godine.
- Book: "Narodnosni i vjerski sastav stanovništva Hrvatske, 1880-1991: po naseljima, author: Jakov Gelo, izdavač: Državni zavod za statistiku Republike Hrvatske, 1998., ISBN 953-6667-07-X, ISBN 978-953-6667-07-9;
