= Mihajlo Lukić =

Croatian general (1886–1961)

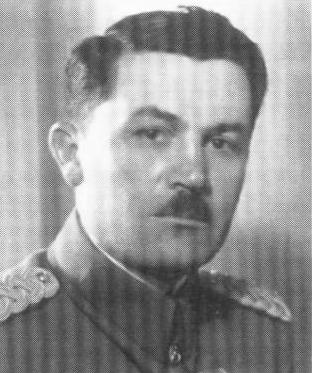
- Mihajlo Lukić in Royal Yugoslav Army uniform
- Born: 24 September 1886; Virje, Croatia-Slavonia, Austria-Hungary
- Died: July 18, 1961 (aged 74); Zagreb, PR Croatia, Yugoslavia
- Burial place: Mirogoj cemetery, Zagreb, Croatia
- Military career
- Allegiance: Austria-Hungary (until 1918) Yugoslavia (1918–1941) Croatia (1941–1943)
- Service years: 1905–1943
- Rank: General
- Conflicts: World War I World War II in Yugoslavia

Mihajlo Lukić (24 September 1886 – 18 July 1961) was a Croatian general who began his career as an officer in the Austro-Hungarian Army during World War I, then climbed the hierarchy of the Royal Yugoslav Army, finally joining the Croatian Home Guard during World War II. He was retired in 1943 due to his disapproval of sending Croat volunteers to the Wehrmacht. After the collapse of the Independent State of Croatia, communist authorities sentenced him to 10 years in prison.

== Early life ==
Lukić was the father of a musical school professor, Darko Lukić. He finished gymnasium in Bjelovar, and was then sent to the Higher Cadet school in Karlovac. He then finished the Military Academy in Vienna. Although his family was of Serb origin, he identified as Croat.

== World War II ==
At the start of the April War, Lukić headed the Triglav Alpine Detachment. From the establishment of the Independent State of Croatia in April 1941 until June he headed the Osijek Division. From July to October 1941 he headed the Lika Brigade based in Bihać. He also briefly served as liaison officer to the Second Italian Army and was inspector-general of the infantry.

From late 1941 until April 1943 he served as commander of the III Domobran Corps, covering much of the southern Independent State of Croatia. In 1942 he became outspoken against Croatian soldiers joining German units and claimed that German economic interests were outweighing the interests of the new Croatian state. He was forced to retire in 1943, after being suspected to have contacts with Chetniks.

He was sentenced to ten years imprisonment in Communist Yugoslavia. He is buried at Mirogoj cemetery.
