= Nada Dimić =

Yugoslav partisan (1923–1942)

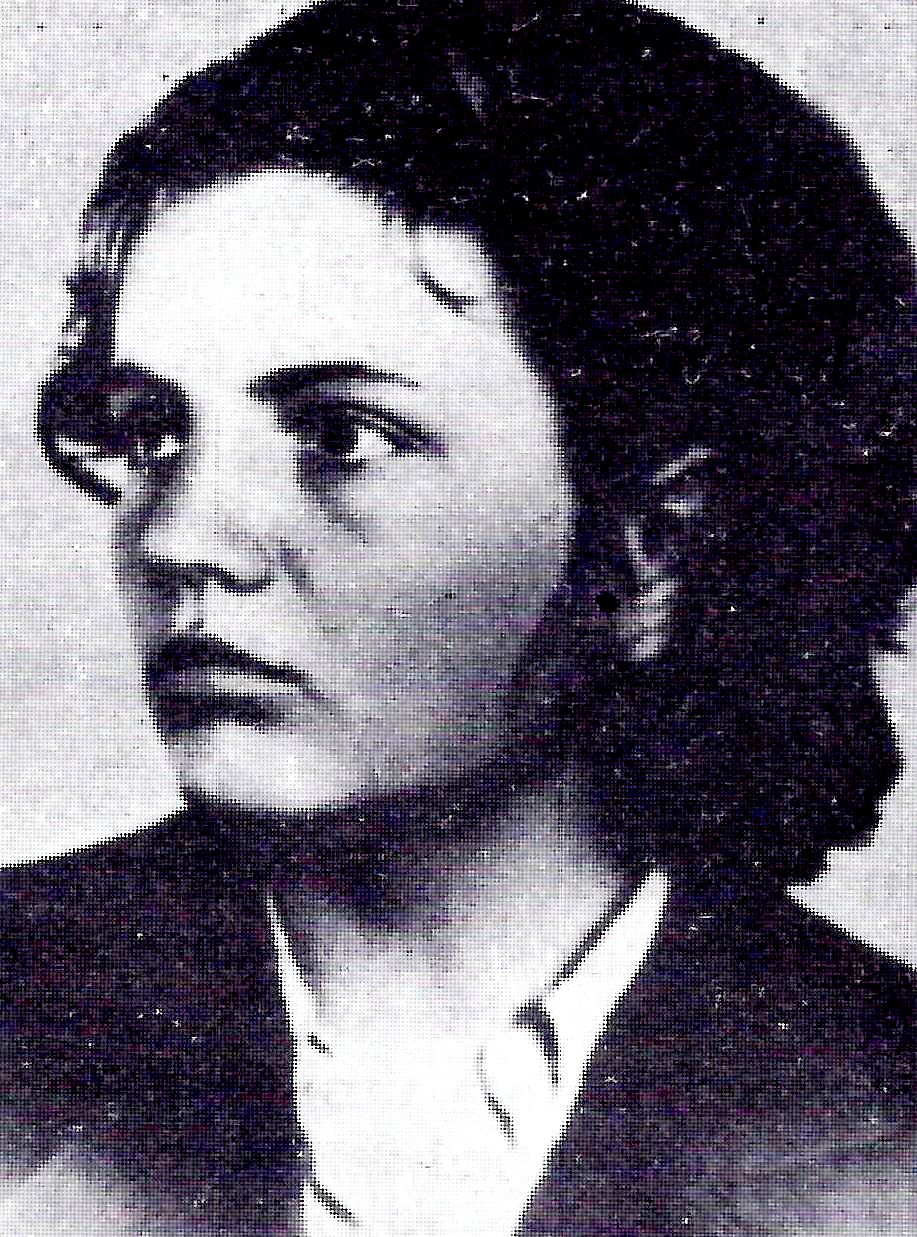
Nada Dimić

Nada Dimić (6 September 1923 – 17 March 1942) was a Yugoslav Partisan who died in World War II and was proclaimed a People's Hero of Yugoslavia.

Nada Dimić was born in Divoselo near Gospić, Kingdom of Serbs, Croat and Slovenes (modern Croatia) to an ethnic Serb family. She finished four grades of elementary school in Gospić, and then moved to Zemun for another four grades of gymnasium and one year of the economics academy. In 1938 she joined the Communist Youth, and in 1940 the Communist Party of Yugoslavia.

When Yugoslavia was invaded during World War II, in June 1941 she joined the 1st Sisak Partisan Detachment, the first Partisan unit in Croatia. The same year, the Ustaša police arrested her in Sisak, but as they transferred her to the prison in Zagreb, she swallowed poison in order to avoid interrogation. It did not kill her, but she was soon rescued by the Zagreb cell of the Party, and transferred to the Partisan-controlled areas of Kordun.

When she recovered from the poisoning, she went to Karlovac where she worked as an undercover agent for the Partisans. She was eventually caught by the Italians who surrendered her to the Ustaša police on 3 December 1941, who then tortured her. She refused to give them any information, and was sent to the Stara Gradiška concentration camp in February 1942. She was murdered there a month later, aged 18.

== Legacy ==
She was awarded the title of People's Hero of Yugoslavia, posthumously, after the war (on 7 July 1951). A (now defunct) textile factory in Zagreb was named after her.

== Sources ==
- Tétreault, Mary Ann (1994). Women and revolution in Africa, Asia, and the New World. Columbia, S.C.: University of South Carolina Press. ISBN 1-57003-016-2. OCLC 30818340.
