= Pajica Omčikus =

Pavle Omčikus
- Павле Омчикус
- Born: 1912; Srb, Kingdom of Croatia-Slavonia, Austria-Hungary
- Died: March 1942 (aged 29–30); Krbavica, Independent State of Croatia (modern-day Croatia)
- Military career
- Allegiance: Kingdom of Yugoslavia (1933–1934); Chetniks (1941–1942)
- Nickname: Pajo or Pajica
- Commands: Chetnik Regiment "King Peter II"
- Conflicts: Srb uprising

Pavle Omčikus (1912—1942), nicknamed Pajo or Pajica, was a leader of the Serbian rebels during the July 1941 Srb uprising in the Independent State of Croatia. He later commanded the royalist Chetnik Regiment "King Peter II" and collaborated with Italian occupiers. He was killed in Partisan custody in March 1942.

== Early life ==
Pavle Omčikus was born in 1912 in Srb in the Kingdom of Croatia-Slavonia, Austria-Hungary. His father was named Gajo, and his mother Marija. Omčikus' family was well known in the region, as Pavle's father and grandfather were presidents of a Serb municipality. Omčikus completed elementary school in Srb and a gymnasium in Gospić. He served in the Royal Yugoslav Army in Meljine in Kotor Bay from 1933 to 1934. He was a supporter of the social liberal Independent Democratic Party, but later joined the far-right Yugoslav Radical Union (Serbian: Jugoslovenska Radikalna Zajednica).

== World War II ==
=== Uprising ===
At the beginning of the Srb uprising, Omčikus—together with Pera Rajak, Miloš Torbica, and other rebels—attacked Srb and destroyed the Ustaše garrison. Omčikus organized the use of trucks to transport rebels to front-line positions.

In August 1941, the Chetnik Regiment "King Peter II" was established in Lika; and Omčikus was appointed as its commander. He publicly disagreed with communist leaders in Lika, accusing them of being responsible for political division among Serbs.

=== Italian assistance ===
Italy used the uprising as an excuse to attempt to expand the territory of the Independent State of Croatia (NDH) under Italian control deeper into western Bosnia. Chetnik leaders Omčikus, Radjenović, and Major Rašeta claimed that the Italians would save the Serbs from being terrorized by the Ustasha; and that the Italians should be welcomed as liberators. On 26 August 1941, the NDH and Italy agreed that the Second Italian Army would occupy and pacify rebels in the second and third zones. Italy supported Serb rebels in helping to establish Italian influence beyond the zones they occupied per formal agreements.

=== Death ===
Some post-war communist sources emphasized that Omčikus surrendered to the communist-led Partisans with the intention of joining them. Voivode Momčilo Đujić, who was commander of Yugoslav Chetnik forces in Lika, sent an ultimatum to communists to release Omčikus.

Some communist sources claimed that Omčikus committed suicide in a communist-held prison in Krbavica, while contemporary communist reports stated that Omčikus and a group of 30 Yugoslav Chetniks were captured and murdered by communists.

== Sources ==
- Plećaš, Neđeljko B (2004). Ratne godine. Institut za savremenu istoriju. ISBN 9788674030912.
- Đuretić, Veselin (1997). Nasilje nad srpskim ustankom: opsene naroda u ime "Rusije i komunizma". Srpska akademija nauka i umetnosti. ISBN 9788671790246.
- Dizdar, Zdravko (2002). Četnički zločini u Bosni i Hercegovini, 1941.-1945. Hrvatski institut za povijest. ISBN 978-953-6491-86-5.
- Redžić, Enver (2005). Bosnia and Herzegovina in the Second World War. Abingdon-on-Thames: Frank Cass. ISBN 978-0-7146-5625-0.

Sources published in Yugoslavia during communist rule

- Jovanić, Đoko (1988). Ratna sjećanja. Vojnoizdavački i novinski centar.
- Jovanović, Đoko; Rešetić, Ivan (1963). Lika u NOB, 1941[-194 ]: Zbornik. Pišu učesnici. Vojnoizdavački zavod JNA "Vojno delo".
- Majstorović, Milan (1961). Prve iskre: Doljani u NOB. Lykos.
- Damjanović, Danilo (1972). Ustanak naroda Hrvatske 1941 u Srbu i okolini. Progres.
- Antonić, Zdravko; Redžić, Enver (1973). 1941. [i.e. Hiljadu devetsto četrdeset i prva] u historijinaroda Bosne i Hercegovine: Naučni skup, održan u Drvaru od 7. do 9. oktobra 1971. godine. Veselin Masleša.
- Bokan, Branko (1972b). Podgrmeč u NOB: Jedinstvo fronta i pozadane [Podgrmeč in the National Liberation War: Unity at the Front and the Rear]. From the War History of our Nation (in Serbo-Croatian). Belgrade, Yugoslavia: Vojnoizdavački Zavod. OCLC 644787681.
- Dedijer, Vladimir (1951). Dnevnik. Jugoslovenska knjiga.
