= Sisak People's Liberation Partisan Detachment =

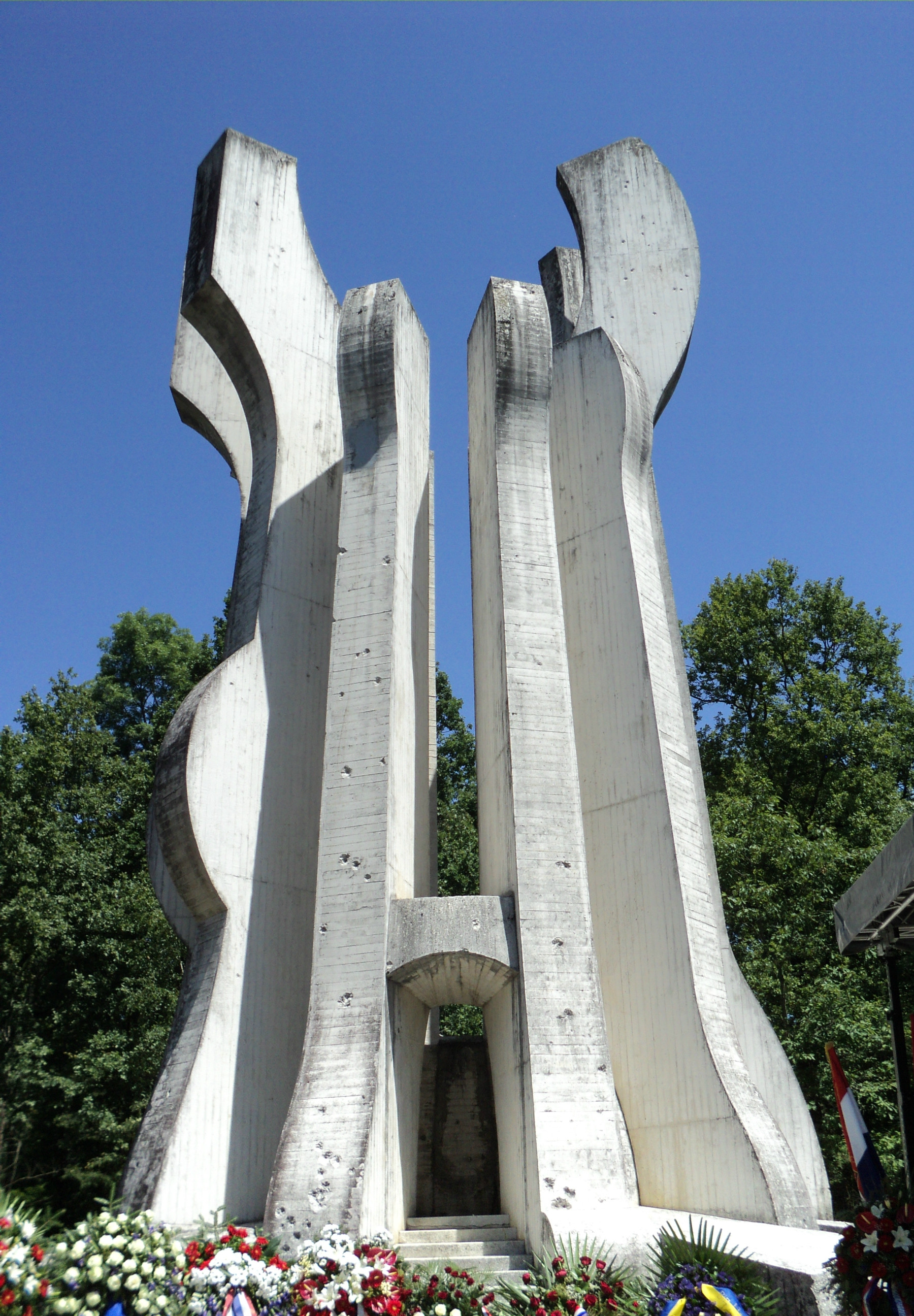
- Monument to the Detachment in Brezovica Forest
- Leader: Vladimir Janjić-Capo
- Dates active: 1941–1945
- Headquarters: Brezovica forest
- Part of: Yugoslav Partisans
- Wars: the Yugoslav People's Liberation War

The Sisak People's Liberation Partisan Detachment (Serbo-Croatian: Sisački narodnooslobodilački partizanski odred), also known as the 1st Sisak Partisan Detachment (1. Sisački partizanski odred), was the first Partisan armed anti-fascist resistance unit formed in occupied Yugoslavia following the invasion of Yugoslavia by the Axis powers in April 1941.

It was formed by the outlawed Croatian Communist Party in the Independent State of Croatia established on 10 April 1941, in the Brezovica Forest near Sisak (in today's Croatia) on 22 June 1941, the day Germany invaded the Soviet Union. It had 79 members, mainly Croats with the exception of one notable Serb woman, Nada Dimić, and was commanded by Vladimir Janjić-Capo.

This event marked the start of armed anti-fascist resistance in occupied Yugoslavia. In modern Croatia, 22 June is commemorated as a public holiday — the Anti-Fascist Struggle Day.

The detachment began resistance activities the day after its creation; launching sabotage and diversionary attacks on nearby railway lines, destroying telegraph poles, attacking municipal buildings in surrounding villages, seizing arms and ammunition and creating a Communist propaganda network in Sisak and nearby villages.

The uprising of the Sisak People's Liberation Partisan Detachment was largely ignored in official Yugoslav historiography that instead claimed that the first uprising in Yugoslavia was the one launched two weeks later in Serbia, led by Tito. In the post-war Socialist Republic of Croatia, the date of the Srb uprising (27 July) was declared a public holiday, known as the "Day of the Uprising of the People of Croatia", also sidelining the uprising of the Sisak People's Liberation Partisan Detachment.

Janko Bobetko, who 50 years later became one of the most prominent Croatian generals in the Croatian War of Independence, joined the unit in July 1941.

== See also ==
- Yugoslav Partisans
- Yugoslav People's Liberation War
- Resistance during World War II
