= Srb =

Srb Срб (Serbian)
- Village
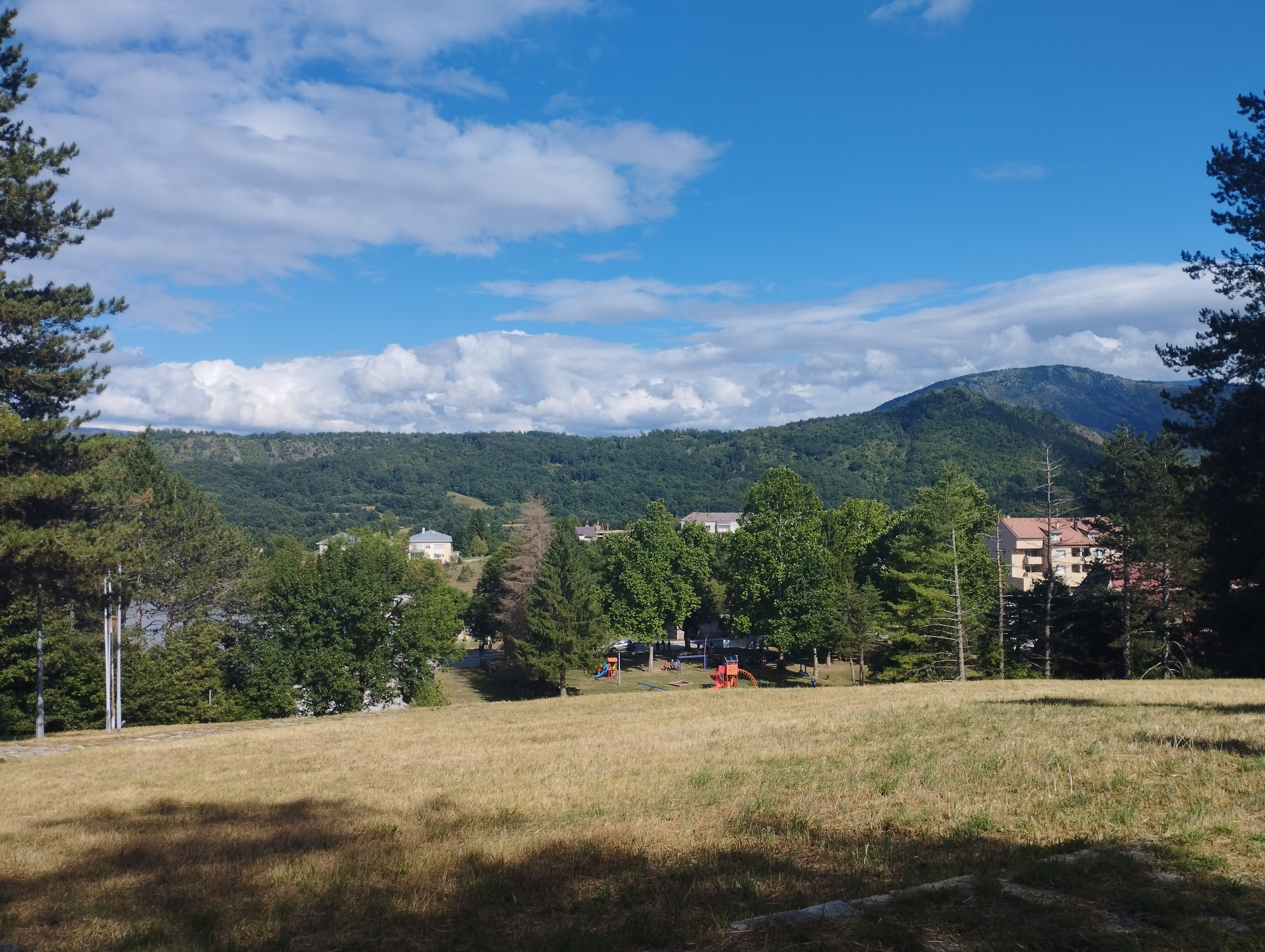
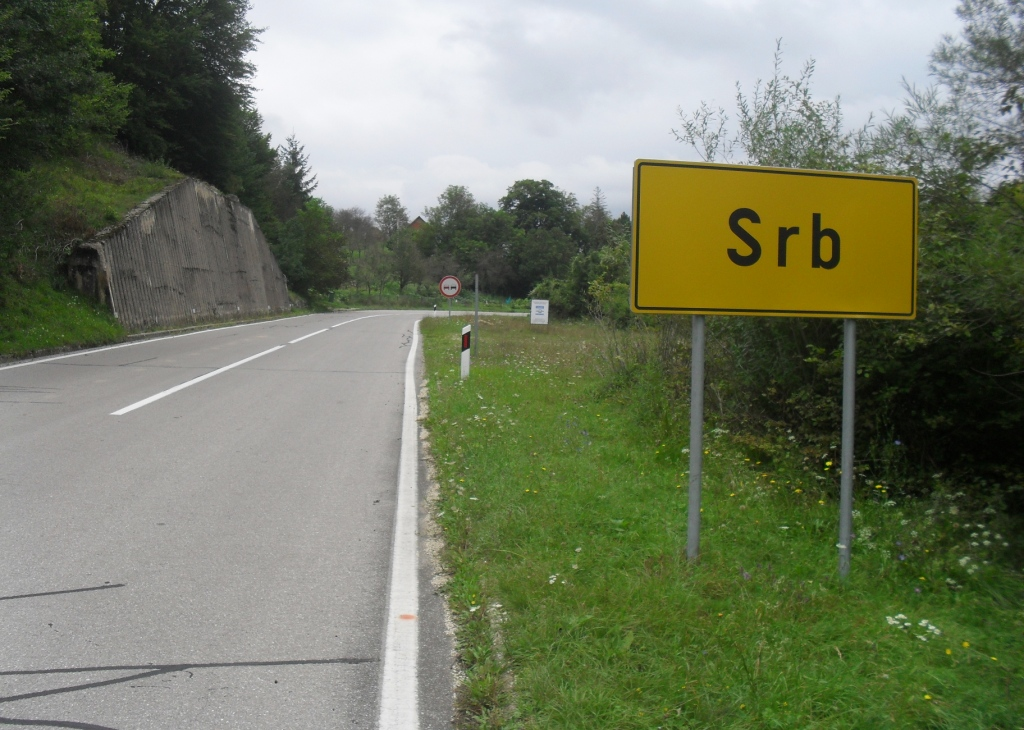
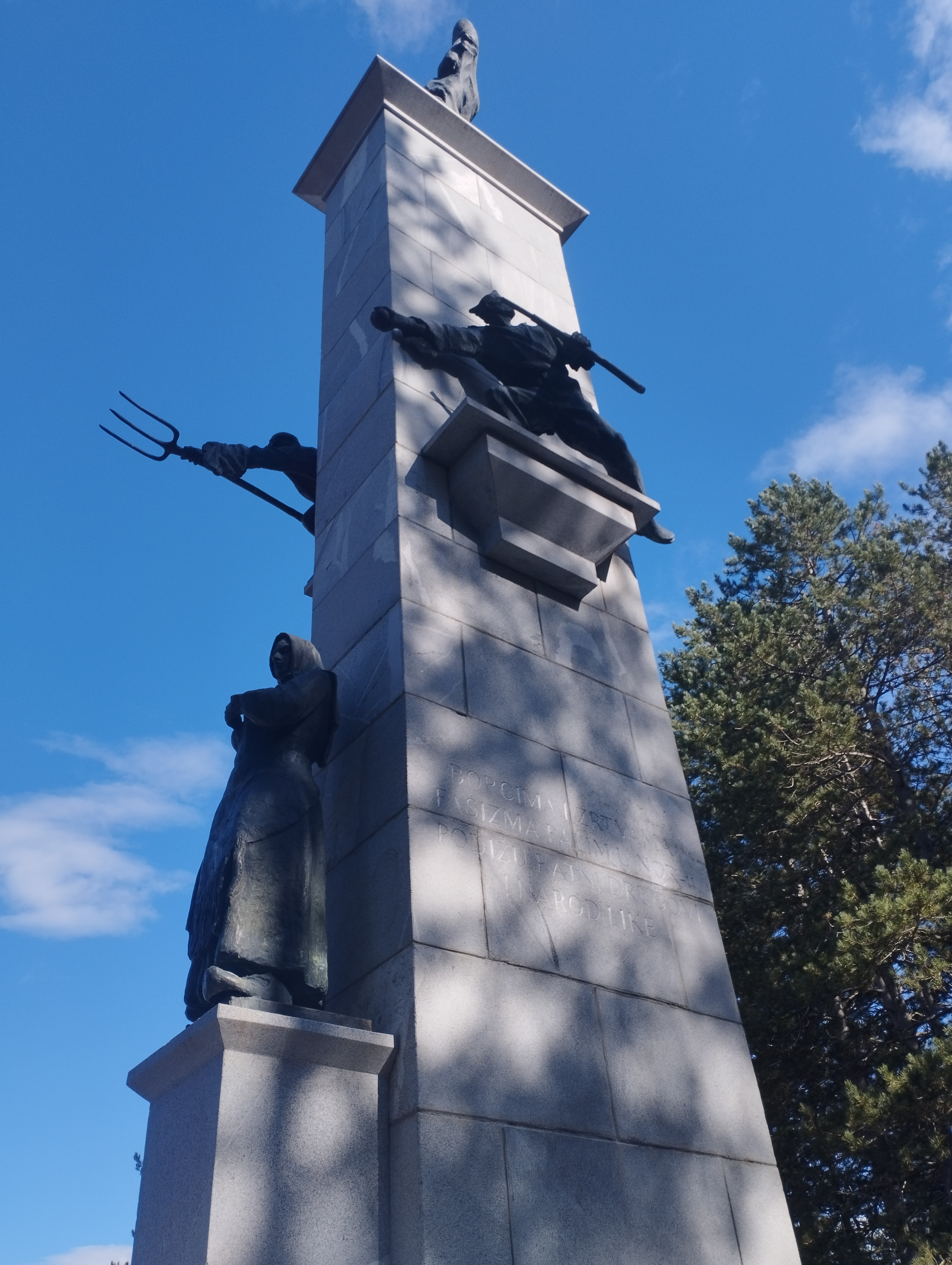
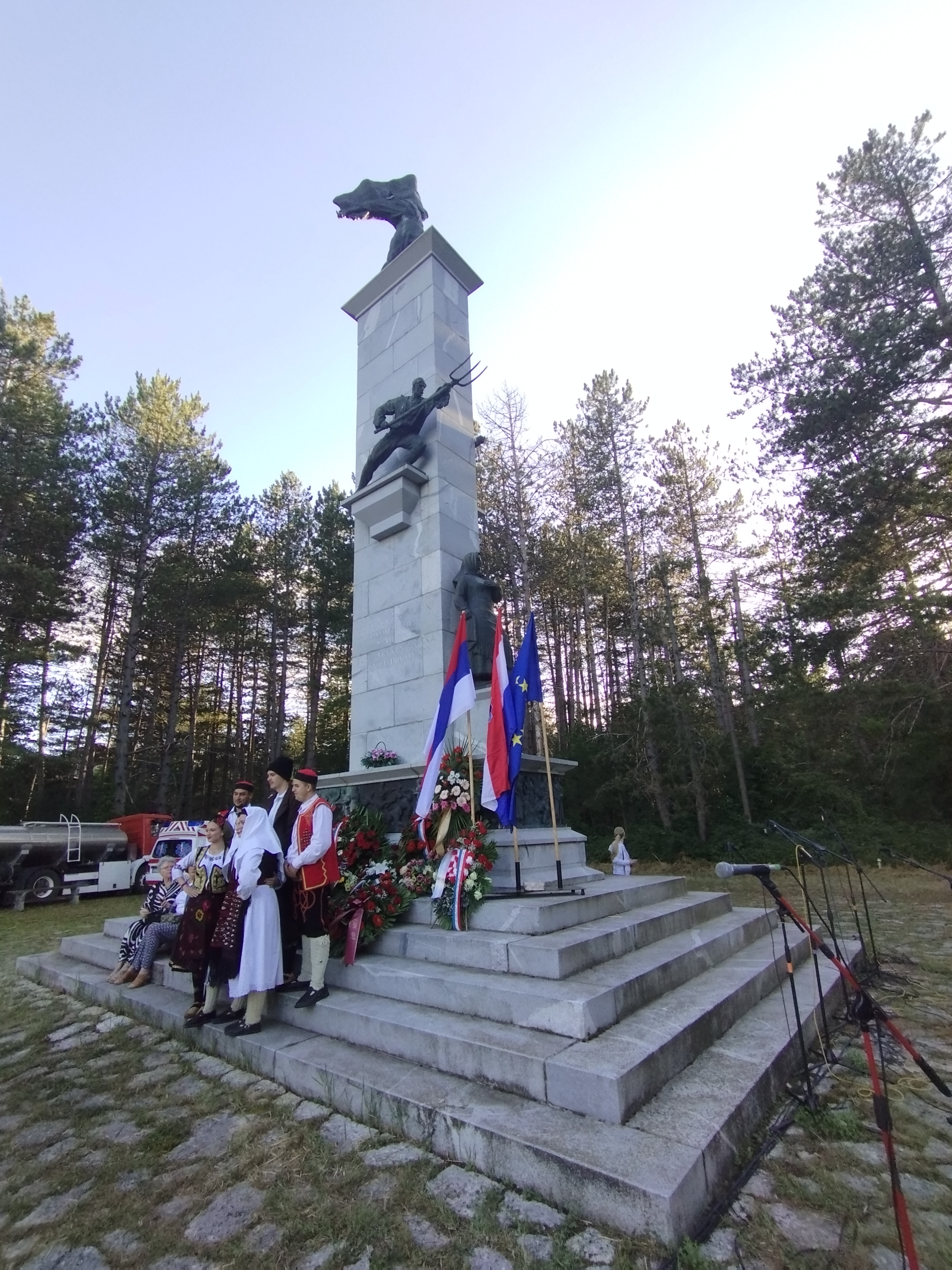
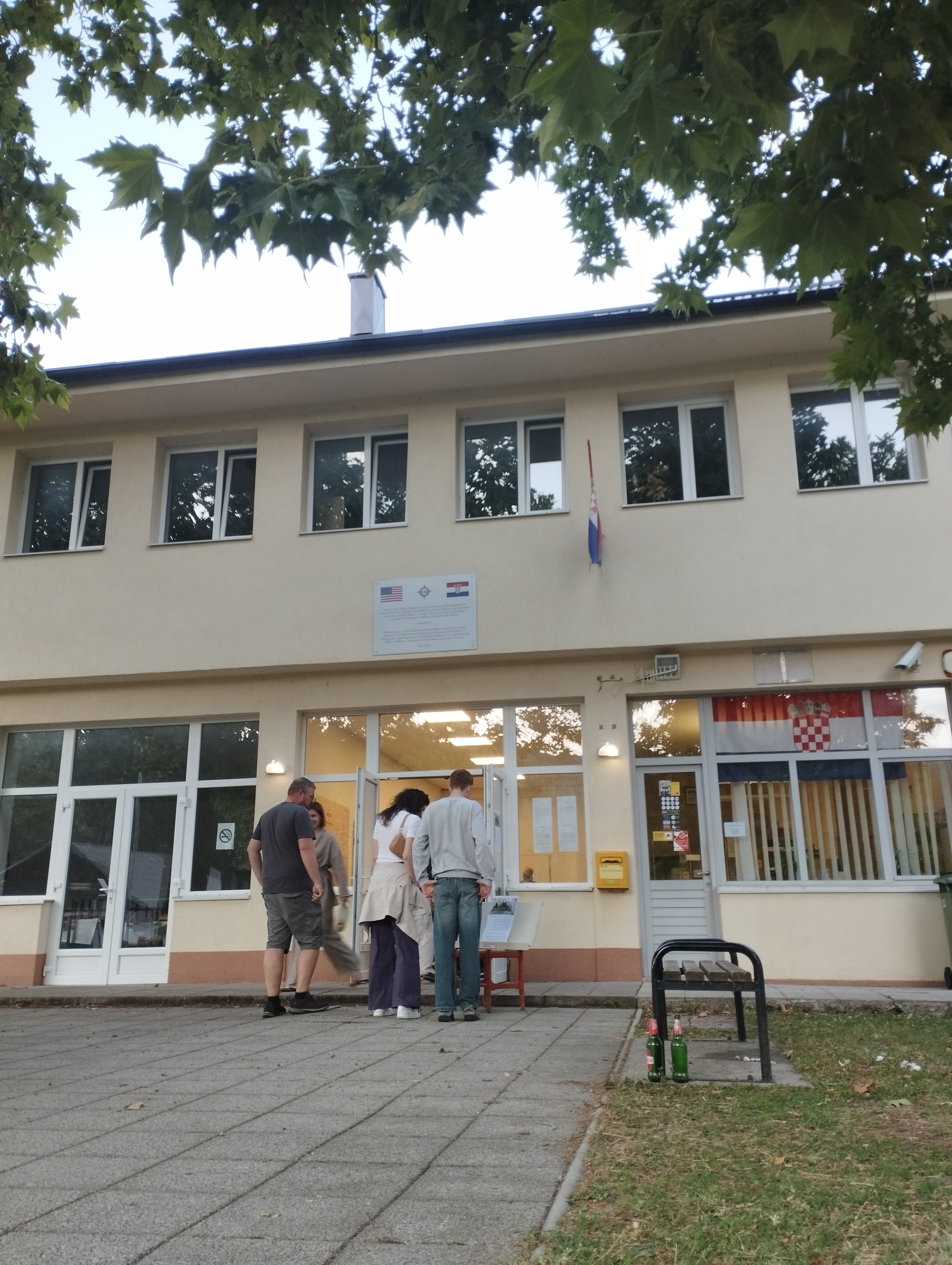
- Village from the hill Entrance traffic sign Srb uprising monument 2025 Srb uprising ceremony Community centre
- Interactive map of Srb
- Location within Croatia
- Coordinates: 44°22′11″N 16°07′30″E
- Country: Croatia
- County: Zadar County
- Municipality: Gračac

Area
  - Total: 17.7 km^{2} (6.8 sq mi)
- Elevation: 434 m (1,424 ft)

Population (2021)
  - Total: 301
  - Density: 17.0/km^{2} (44.0/sq mi)
- Time zone: UTC+1 (CET)
  - Summer (DST): UTC+2 (CEST)
- Postal code: 23445 Srb
- Area code: +385 (23)

Srb (Serbian Cyrillic: Срб) is a village located in the southeastern part of Lika, in Croatia, till 2011 administratively divided into Donji Srb (population 255, census 2001) and Gornji Srb (population 79, census 2001). Srb lies in the Una River valley, on the road from Donji Lapac to Knin, and is east of Gračac. It is currently part of the Gračac municipality and the Zadar County.

== Name ==
According to Croatian linguist and academic Petar Šimunović, etymologically it is a hydronym that derives from the old Croatian verb "serbati" denoting the "spring" of the river Una. Because Serbs (Sorabos) are mentioned in the Royal Frankish Annals in the context of Ljudevit Posavski fleeing to them, there is a theory that a Serbian tribe could have existed in the area of Srb at some point in the 9th century, and that Srb was named after them, but the scarcity of historical records made various historians differ in the interpretations of this mention. That account most probably refers to somewhere in central or eastern Bosnia.

== History ==
In the medieval period, the settlement was the centre of small župa of Srb which was part of a larger župa of Pset of the Duchy and Kingdom of Croatia. In the 13th and 14th century the župa was ruled by Paul I Šubić of Bribir and Nelipić family. In the 14th century is mentioned as a town because a document from the year 1345 mentions it belonging to the Hungary-Croatian king as a royal fortress-citadel, Latin: castra nostra regalia, videlicet Tininium ... castrum Szereb ... castrum Unach vocata cum Corum supatibus et pertinensiis. This town was built on a hill high above the stream Sredice, where its remains still stand today. The župa had a noble court table of at least three judges, and although župans possibly were from the old Croatian noble tribe of Gusić, the Croatian nobles (plemenitimi H'rvati) from the presumed tribe of Srbljani mentioned in 1451 were Marko and Martin Dijanišević, Juraj Henčić, Vojin Matijašević, Vlatko Anić and Jandrij Kovač.

Due to the Ottoman conquest in 1520, most of the old population fled to Northern Croatia and was replaced by pastoral Vlachs. Some of the descendants of the new population also emigrated to Žumberak, while others moved to Northern Dalmatia or converted to Islam. From the settlement's name derives surname of family Srbljanin. As in the 17th century it was on a crossroad between Lapac, Bihać and Udbina, in the fort was allocated a military unit, beneath which emerged a Muslim settlement with around 100 houses. After the Treaty of Sistova (1791), the area of Srb became part of Croatian Military Frontier which resulted in the emigration of the Muslim population over the Una river to Bosnia Eyalet and repopulation of the desolated land by Orthodox Serbs.

After the World War II invasion of Yugoslavia, Srb became part of the fascist puppet state, the Independent State of Croatia, established by Axis forces. On July 27, 1941, an uprising started in Srb organized by the local Serb population, the Srb uprising. The organizers, including the Lapac squad commander Stojan Matić, were not all communist Partisans, and their immediate reprisals against the Ustaše also ended with random Croat and Muslim victims, which Marko Orešković later regretted. The date was nevertheless commemorated in SR Croatia (1945–1990) as the Day of the Uprising of the Peoples of Croatia (Croatian: Dan ustanka naroda Hrvatske).

On July 25, 1990 an assembly of approximately 100,000 Croatian Serbs was held in Srb. A declaration was released which established a Serbian Assembly, with its seat in Srb, as the political representative of the Serbian nation in Croatia, and the Serbian National Council as the executive body of the Assembly. Croatian Serb politician Jovan Rašković announced that a referendum would be held within the Serb community on August 18. During the Croatian War for Independence it was occupied by forces of self-proclaimed Republic of Serbian Krajina until 1995, when most of the Serb population fled in the face of Operation Storm in 1995.

== Population ==
According to the 2011 census, Srb had 472 inhabitants. For detailed population data for the last Yugoslav 1991 census and last Austro-Hungarian 1910 census see former settlements of Donji Srb and Gornji Srb.

Historical population 1857-2021
v

population	861	1043	1058	1121	1240	1257	1302	1395	971	930	956	1156	1227	1454	334	472	301
	1857	1869	1880	1890	1900	1910	1921	1931	1948	1953	1961	1971	1981	1991	2001	2011	2021

Sources: Croatian Bureau of Statistics publications

== Literature ==
- Savezni zavod za statistiku i evidenciju FNRJ i SFRJ, popis stanovništva 1948, 1953, 1961, 1971, 1981. i 1991. godine.
- Knjiga: "Narodnosni i vjerski sastav stanovništva Hrvatske, 1880-1991: po naseljima, author: Jakov Gelo, izdavač: Državni zavod za statistiku Republike Hrvatske, 1998., ISBN 953-6667-07-X, ISBN 978-953-6667-07-9;
