= List of political parties in Yugoslavia =

This article lists political parties in Yugoslavia (1918–1991). The Kingdom of Yugoslavia was a multi-party state (1918–1929, 1931–1941) and a one-party state under a royal dictatorship (1929–1931). The Socialist Federal Republic of Yugoslavia was a Marxist–Leninist one-party state (1945–1948), a Titoist one-party state (1948-1990), and also a multi-party state for short period before the breakup of Yugoslavia (1990–1992).

== List ==
=== Kingdom of Yugoslavia ===
| Name | Ideology | Position | Activity |
|---|---|---|---|
| Agrarian Party; Земљорадничка странка Zemljoradnička stranka | Agrarianism; Parliamentarism | Centre-right | 1919–1945 |
| Bunjevac-Šokac Party; Буњевачко-шокачка странка Bunjevačko-šokačka stranka | Agrarianism; Conservatism | Centre-right | 1920–1926 |
| Communist Party of Yugoslavia; Komunistička partija Jugoslavije; Комунистичка партија Југославије | Communism; Marxism–Leninism | Left-wing to far-left | 1919–1921 |
| Croatian Party of Rights; Hrvatska stranka prava | Croatian ultranationalism Republicanism; National conservatism | Right-wing to far-right | 1918–1929 |
| Croatian Peasant Party; Hrvatska seljačka stranka | Agrarianism; Liberalism; Regionalism | Centre-right | 1918–1945 |
| Croatian Popular Party; Hrvatska pučka stranka | Political Catholicism; National conservatism Social conservatism | Right-wing | 1919–1929 |
| Democratic Party; Демократска странка Demokratska stranka | Liberalism; Yugoslavism | Centre | 1918–1945 |
| Džemijet; Џемијет | Islamism; Albanian nationalism Social conservatism | Right-wing to far-right | 1918–1924 |
| German Party; Немачка странка Nemačka stranka | German minority interests Parliamentarism | Centre-right | 1922–1929 |
| Independent Agrarian Party; Samostojna kmetijska stranka | Agrarianism; Regionalism; Liberalism | Centre-left | 1919–1926 |
| Independent Democratic Party; Самостална демократска странка Samostalna demokratska stranka | Liberalism; Decentralization | Centre | 1924–1946 |
| Montenegrin Federalist Party; Црногорска федералистичка странка | Montenegrin nationalism National conservatism Agrarianism | Right-wing to far-right | 1923–1945 |
| People's Radical Party; Народна радикална странка | Serbian nationalism Yugoslavism; Conservatism | Centre-right to right-wing | 1918–1945 |
| Yugoslav Social-Democratic Party; Jugoslovanska socialdemokratska stranka | Social democracy | Centre-left | 1918–1921 |
| Social Democratic Party of Yugoslavia; Socijaldemokratska stranka Jugoslavije | Social democracy | Centre-left | 1920–1921 |
| People's Socialist Party; Народно-социјалистичка странка Narodno-socijalistička stranka | Social democracy Social liberalism | Centre to centre-left | 1919–1945 |
| Slovene People's Party; Slovenska ljudska stranka | Conservatism; Christian democracy Regionalism | Centre-right | 1918–1945 |
| Slovene Peasant Party; Slovenska kmetska stranka | Agrarianism; Liberalism; Regionalism | Centre | 1926–1929 |
| Socialist Party of Yugoslavia; Социјалистичка партија Југославије; Socijalistička partija Jugoslavije | Socialism; Republicanism | Left-wing | 1921–1941 |
| Yugoslav Radical Union; Југословенска радикална заједница Jugoslovenska radikalna zajednica | Yugoslav fascism Anti-communism | Far-right | 1934–1941 |
| Yugoslav National Party; Jugoslavenska nacionalna partija Југословенска национална партија | Royalism; Anti-liberalism | Right-wing | 1929–1941 |
| Yugoslav Republican Party; Југословенска републиканска странка Jugoslovenska republikanska stranka | Republicanism; Liberalism | Centre | 1920–1929 |
| Yugoslav National Movement; Југословенски народни покрет | Fascism; Christian nationalism National conservatism | Far-right | 1935–1945 |
| Yugoslav Muslim Organization; Jugoslavenska muslimanska organizacija | Bosniak nationalism Islamism; Conservatism | Right-wing | 1919–1941 |

=== SFR Yugoslavia ===
| Name | Abbreviation | Ideology | Position |
|---|---|---|---|
Federal-level parties
| League of Communists; Савез комуниста Југославије; Savez komunista Jugoslavije | SKJ | Titoism; Yugoslav federalism | Left-wing to far-left |
| Union of Reform Forces; Savez reformskih snaga Савез реформских снага | SRSJ | Yugoslavism; Social democracy Social liberalism | Centre-left |
In SR Bosnia-Herzegovina only (1990)
| Party of Democratic Action; Stranka demokratske akcije | SDA | Bosniak nationalism Conservatism; Islamism | Right-wing |
| Serb Democratic Party; Српска демократска странка Srpska demokratska stranka | SDS | Ultranationalism; Serbian irredentism Right-wing populism | Far-right |
| Croatian Democratic Union of BiH; Hrvatska demokratska zajednica BiH | HDZ BiH | Croatian nationalism National conservatism Christian democracy | Right-wing |
| Social Democratic Party of BiH; Socijaldemokratska partija BiH | SKBiH - SDP BiH | Anti-nationalism; Democratic socialism Social democracy | Left-wing |
In SR Croatia only (1990)
| Croatian Democratic Union; Hrvatska demokratska zajednica | HDZ | Ultranationalism; Croatian irredentism Anti-liberalism | Right-wing |
| Party of Democratic Reform; Stranka demokratskih promjena | SKH- SDP | Democratic socialism Anti-nationalism; Social democracy | Left-wing |
| Coalition of People's Accord; Koalicija narodnog sporazuma | KNS | Civic nationalism Social liberalism Liberalism | Centre |
In SR Macedonia only (1990)
| VMRO-DPMNE; ВМРО–ДПМНЕ | VMRO- DPMNE | Macedonian nationalism National conservatism Anti-communism | Right-wing |
In SR Slovenia only (1990)
| Democratic Opposition of Slovenia; Demokratična opozicija Slovenije | DEMOS | Christian democracy Liberalism; Slovenian nationalism | Centre-right |
| United List of Social Democrats; Združena lista socialnih demokratov | ZLSD | Social democracy Slovenian statism Pro-Europeanism | Centre-left |
| Slovenian People's Party; Slovenska ljudska stranka | SLS | Conservatism; Christian democracy Agrarianism | Centre-right |
| Liberal Democracy of Slovenia; Liberalna demokracija Slovenije | LDS | Liberalism; Social liberalism Pro-Europeanism | Centre |
In SR Serbia only (1990)
| Socialist Party of Serbia; Социјалистичка партија Србије; Socijalistička partija Srbije | SPS | Populism; Serbian nationalism Communism | Left-wing |
| Serbian Renewal Movement; Српски покрет обнове Srpski pokret obnove | SPO | Serbian nationalism Serbian irredentism Monarchism | Right-wing |
| Democratic Party; Демократска странка Demokratska stranka | DS | Liberalism; Social liberalism Pro-Europeanism | Centre |

== See also ==
- List of political parties in Bosnia and Herzegovina
- List of political parties in Croatia
- List of political parties in Kosovo
- List of political parties in Montenegro
- List of political parties in North Macedonia
- List of political parties in Serbia
- List of political parties in Slovenia
