= 1927 Kingdom of Serbs, Croats and Slovenes parliamentary election =

- 11 September 1927
- All 315 seats in the National Assembly; 158 seats needed for a majority
Party	Leader	Vote %	Seats	+/–
NRS	Aca Stanojević	31.92	112	+1
DS	Ljubomir Davidović	16.42	59	+23
HSS	Stjepan Radić	15.81	61	−6
SDS	Svetozar Pribićević	8.56	22	+14
ZS	Jovan Jovanović Pižon	5.85	9	+5
SLS	Anton Korošec	4.57	20	0
DS–JMO	–	3.17	11	New
JMO	Mehmed Spaho	2.52	9	−6
NS	Ludwig Kremling	2.14	6	+1
HB	Ante Trumbić	1.95	2	New
HPS	Stjepan Barić	1.37	1	+1
SPJ	Vitomir Korać	1.03	1	+1
SKS	Ivan Pucelj	0.43	1	0
CFS	Sekula Drljević	0.22	1	−2
This lists parties that won seats. See the complete results below.
Prime Minister before	Prime Minister after
Velimir Vukićević; NRS	Velimir Vukićević; NRS

Parliamentary elections were held in the Kingdom of Serbs, Croats and Slovenes on 11 September 1927. The People's Radical Party remained the largest faction in Parliament, winning 112 of the 315 seats.

== Results ==
Party	Votes	%	Seats	+/–
People's Radical Party	742,111	31.92	112	+1
Democratic Party	381,784	16.42	59	+23
Croatian Peasant Party	367,570	15.81	61	–6
Independent Democratic Party	199,040	8.56	22	+14
Agrarian Party	136,076	5.85	9	+5
Slovene People's Party	106,247	4.57	20	0
Democratic Party–JMO	73,703	3.17	11	New
Yugoslav Muslim Organization	58,623	2.52	9	–6
German Party	49,849	2.14	6	+1
Croatian Bloc	45,218	1.95	2	New
Workers' Republican Union	43,114	1.85	0	0
Croatian Popular Party	31,746	1.37	1	+1
Socialist Party of Yugoslavia	24,035	1.03	1	+1
Independent Agrarian Party	9,900	0.43	1	0
Republican Party	6,122	0.26	0	0
Montenegrin Federalist Party	5,153	0.22	1	–2
Romanian Party	4,654	0.20	0	New
Serbian Party	2,142	0.09	0	0
Bunjevac-Šokac Party	1,618	0.07	0	0
Croatian Community	1,103	0.05	0	New
Others	34,862	1.50	0	–
Total	2,324,670	100.00	315	0
Registered voters/turnout	3,375,593	–		
Source: Nohlen et al., Rothschild

== Ethnic breakdown ==
The members of parliament had the following ethnic makeup:

Ethnic breakdown of parliament
Party	Serbs	Croats	Slovenes	Bunjevci	Undeclared	Germans	Hungarians	Albanians	Turks	Total
People's Radical Party	102	2	-	2	-	-	2	3	1	112
Croatian Peasant Party	2	59	2	-	-	-	-	-	-	63
Democratic Party	56	2	-	-	-	-	1	1	1	61
Independent Democratic Party	13	5	4	-	-	-	-	-	-	22
Yugoslav People's Party	-	1	20	-	-	-	-	-	-	21
Agrarian Union	9	-	-	-	-	-	-	-	-	9
Yugoslav Muslim Organization	1	11	-	-	6	-	-	-	-	18
German Party	-	-	-	-	-	6	-	-	-	6
Small groups	-	2	1	-	-	-	-	-	-	3
Total	183	82	27	2	6	6	3	4	2	313

== Elected representatives ==
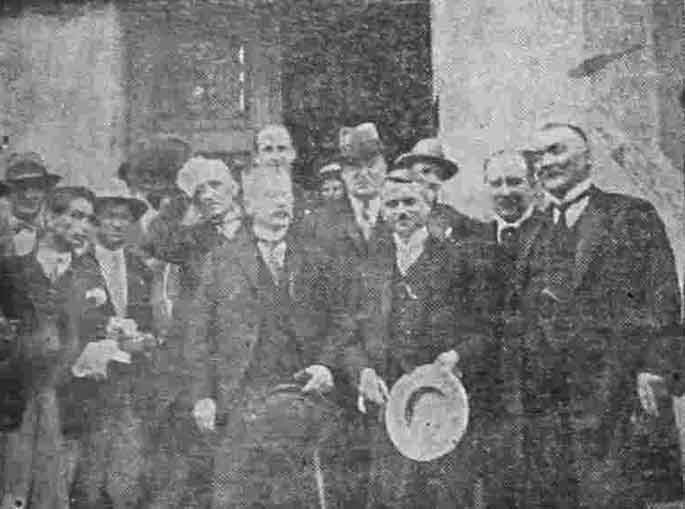
New members of parliament after swearing Oath.

- S. Barić - Croatian Popular Party
- Đuro Basariček - Croatian Peasant Party
- Sekula Drljević - Montenegrin Federalist Party
- Anton Korošec - Slovene People's Party
- Filip Markotić - Croatian Peasant Party
- Ante Pavelić - Croatian Bloc
- Ivan Pernar - Croatian Peasant Party
- Puniša Račić - People's Radical Party
- Stjepan Radić - Croatian Peasant Party
- Milan Stojadinović - People's Radical Party
- Ante Trumbić - Croatian Bloc
