= 1923 Kingdom of Serbs, Croats and Slovenes parliamentary election =

- 18 March 1923
- All 312 seats in the National Assembly; 157 seats needed for a majority
Party	Leader	Vote %	Seats	+/–
NRS	Nikola Pašić	25.82	108	+17
HSS	Stjepan Radić	21.76	70	+20
DS	Ljubomir Davidović	18.39	51	−41
ZS	Mihailo Avramović	7.05	10	−29
SLS–HPS	Anton Korošec; Stjepan Barić	5.81	21	
JMO	Mehmed Spaho	5.16	18	−6
Džemijet	Nexhip Draga	3.28	14	+6
SPJ	Vitomir Korać	2.22	2	−8
NS	Ludwig Kremling	1.99	8	New
JZAT	Ante Trumbić	0.74	2	+1
SS		0.7	1	New
BŠS	Blaško Rajić	0.59	3	
SKS	Ivan Pucelj	0.51	1	New
CFS	Sekula Drljević	0.39	2	New
RP		0.32	1	New
This lists parties that won seats. See the complete results below.
Prime Minister before	Prime Minister after
Nikola Pašić; NRS	Nikola Pašić; NRS

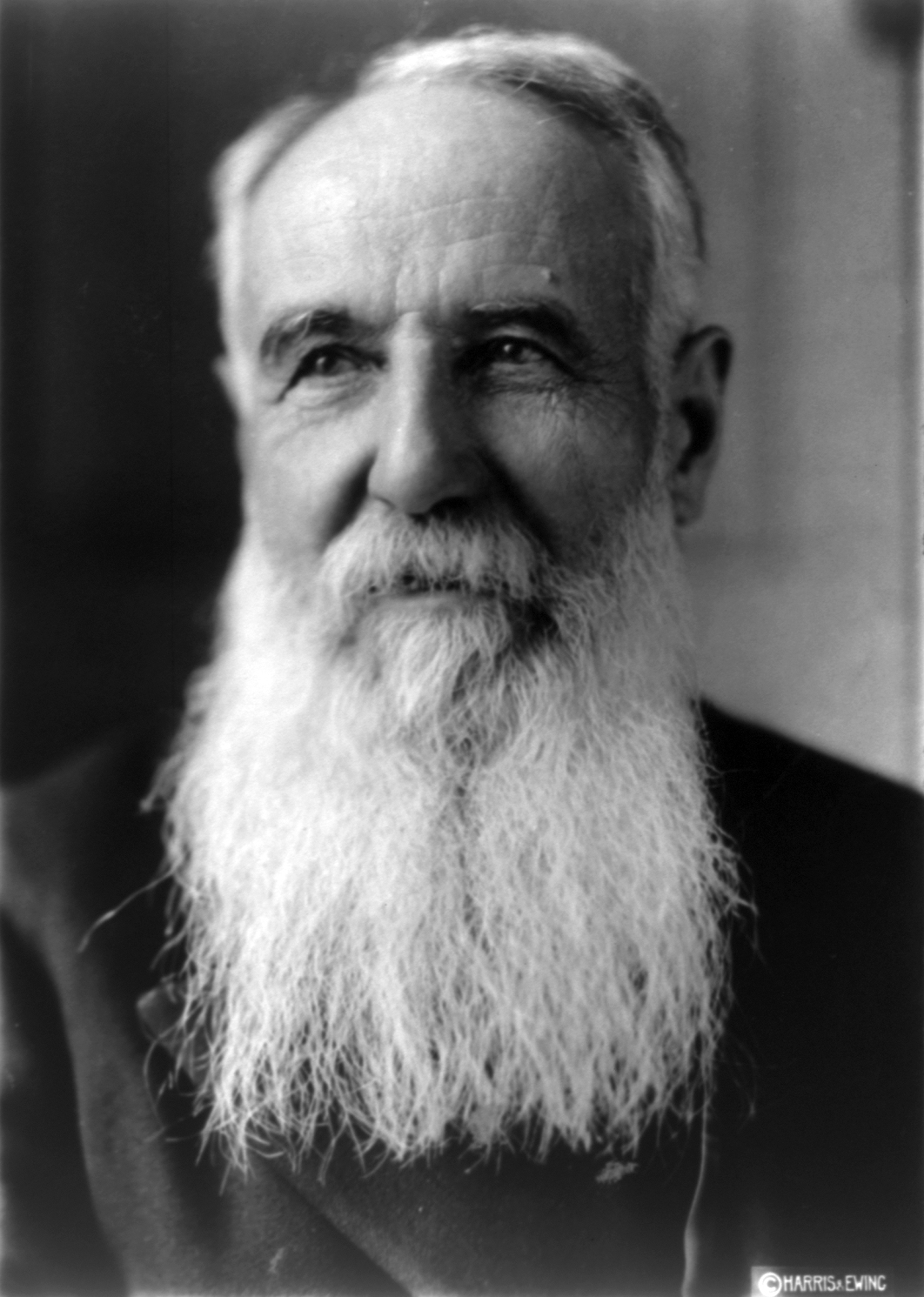
Nikola Pašić

Parliamentary elections were held in the Kingdom of Serbs, Croats and Slovenes on 18 March 1923. The seats were divided up by the political borders which existed before the Kingdom's formation and distributed using the population statistics of 1910.

According to a TIME Magazine article published in the week following the election, the poll was marred by voter intimidation by the military police, suppression of the opposition and the disenfranchisement of ethnic minorities like the Hungarians and the Turks.

After the elections, an opposition Federalist Bloc was formed from the Croatian Republican Peasant Party, Slovenian People's Party and Yugoslav Muslim Organization.

== Results ==
Party	Votes	%	Seats	+/–
People's Radical Party	562,213	25.82	108	+17
Croatian Peasant Party	473,733	21.76	70	+20
Democratic Party	400,342	18.39	51	–41
Agrarian Party	153,579	7.05	10	–29
Slovene People's Party–Croatian Popular Party	126,378	5.81	21	–
Yugoslav Muslim Organization	112,228	5.16	18	–6
Džemijet	71,453	3.28	14	+6
Socialist Party of Yugoslavia	48,337	2.22	2	–8
German Party	43,415	1.99	8	New
Independent Workers' Party	24,321	1.12	0	New
Republican Party	18,941	0.87	0	–3
Ante Trumbić List	16,209	0.74	2	+1
Serbian Party	15,236	0.70	1	New
Bunjevac-Šokac Party	12,793	0.59	3	–
Independent Agrarian Party	11,023	0.51	1	New
Montenegrin Federalist Party	8,561	0.39	2	New
Croatian Party of Rights	8,089	0.37	0	–2
Romanian Party	7,070	0.32	1	New
Croatian Husbandmen's Party	5,468	0.25	0	–7
People's Socialist Party	4,064	0.19	0	–2
Liberal Party	3,384	0.16	0	–1
Others	50,214	2.31	0	–
Total	2,177,051	100.00	312	–107
Registered voters/turnout	2,971,370	–		
Source: Sternberger et al., Rothschild

== Elected representatives ==
=== Serbia (73 seats including Belgrade) ===
==== Belgrade city (2 seats) ====
- Nikola Pašić (NRS, also elected in the Tuzla and Srem district)
- Ljubomir Davidović (DS, also elected in Belgrade district and Vranje district)

==== Belgrade district (4 seats) ====
- Aleksa Žujović (NRS, also elected in the Smederevo district)
- Sreten Petrović (NRS)
- Ljubomir Davidović (DS, also elected in Belgrade city and Vranje district)
- ? (DS)

==== Valjevo district (4 seats) ====
- M. Đuričić (NRS)
- Vićentija Matić (NRS)
- Pera Marković (DS)
- Voja Lazić (Agrarian party)

==== Vranje district (7 seats) ====
- Milutin Dragović (NRS)
- Stojan Kostić (NRS)
- Vlajko Kocić (NRS)
- Dimitrije Popović (NRS)
- Ljubomir Davidović (DS, also elected in Belgrade city and Belgrade district)
- Krsta Prokić (DS)
- Ž, Rafajlović (DS)

==== Kragujevac district (5 seats) ====
- dr Miloš Radosavljević (DS)
- dr Dragutin Kojić (NRS)
- Tadija Pantović (NRS)
- ? (NRS)
- ? (NRS)

==== Kruševac district (4 seats) ====
- Božidar Jeličić (NRS)
- ? (NRS)
- Ljuba Ristić (DS)
- ?

==== Krajina district (3 seats) ====
- Đoka Popović (DS)
- Velizar Janković (NRS, also elected in the Skopje district)
- ? (NRS)

==== Morava district (5 seats) ====
- Velja Popović (NRS)
- Nastas Petrović (NRS)
- ? (NRS)
- D. Pećić (DS)
- ? (DS)

==== Niš district (5 seats) ====
- Rad. Agatonović (DS)
- Nikola Uzunović (NRS)
- Vlada Miletić (NRS)
- Mihailo Srećković (NRS)
- Nikola Mitić (NRS)

==== Pirot district (3 seats) ====
- V. Vukićević (NRS)
- Mitar Ćirković (NRS)
- Đorđe Ćirić (NRS)

==== Požarevac district (6 seats) ====
- Lj. Stojadinović (NRS)
- ? (NRS)
- ? (NRS)
- ? (NRS)
- V. Marinković (DS)
- ? (DS)

==== Podrinje district (6 seats) ====
- Miloš Moskovljević (Agrarian)
- Voja Veljković (DS)
- Milorad Vujičić (NRS, also elected in the Užice district)
- Ninko Perić (NRS)
- Mihailo Ranković (NRS)
- Živojin Dimitrijević (NRS)

==== Rudnik district (2 seats) ====
- Rajko Ilić (NRS)
- Nikola Sretenović (DS)

==== Smederevo district (3 seats) ====
- Aleksa Žujović (NRS, also elected in the Belgrade district)
- K. Timotijević (DS)
- ? (DS)

==== Timok district (4 seats) ====
- Aleksandar Mijović (DS)
- Krsta MIletić (NRS, also elected in the Kosovo district)
- ? (NRS)
- ? (NRS)

==== Toplica district (3 seats) ====
- Dragan Bojović (NRS)
- ? (NRS)
- ? (NRS)

==== Užice district (4 seats) ====
- Miša Trifenović (NRS)
- Andra Stanić (NRS)
- Petar M. Bjelica (NRS)
- Milorad Vujičić (NRS, also elected in the Podrinje district)

==== Čačak district (3 seats) ====
- M. Sokić (DS)
- Petar Bogavac (NRS)
- Anta Radojević (NRS)

=== South Serbia (41 seats) ===
==== Bitola district (6 seats) ====
- Jovan Ćirković (NRS)
- Petar Robević (NRS)
- Kosta Kumanudi (DS)
- Dimitrije Čičević (DS)
- Ćenan Zija (Džemijet)
- Sadedin Rušid (Džemijet)

==== Bregalnica district (2 seats) ====
- Vlada Puzderlijević (NRS)
- ? (NRS)

==== Zvečan-Raška district (4 seats) ====
- Živko A. Šušić (NRS)
- ? (Džemijet)
- ? (Džemijet)
- ? (Džemijet)

==== Kosovo district (5 seats) ====
- Krsta Miletić (NRS, also elected in the Timok district)
- Jovan Magovčević (DS)
- Hadži Džemail Aluš (Džemijet)
- ? (Džemijet)
- ? (Džemijet)

==== Kumanovo district (3 seats) ====
- Mladen Nikolić (DS)
- Trajko Arsić (DS)
- Dimitrije Trajković (DS)

==== Metohija district (2 seats) ====
- Nedžib Beg Bašić (NRS)
- ? (NRS)

==== Ohrid district (2 seats) ====
- Ilija Šumenković (DS)
- Rista Nastasijević (DS)

==== Prizren district (3 seats) ====
- Rista Skakaljević (NRS)
- Andreja Kujundžić (NRS)
- ? (NRS)

==== Prijepolje district (3 seats) ====
- Sreten Vukosavljević (DS)
- ? (DS)
- ? (Džemijet)

==== Skopje district (4 seats) ====
- Mihailo Kujundžić (DS)
- dr Velizar Janković (NRS, also elected in the Krajina district)
- Ćemal Osman (Džemijet)
- ? (Džemijet)

==== Tetovo district (4 seats) ====
- ? (NRS)
- ? (NRS)
- Halil Beg Draga (Džemijet)
- ? (Džemijet)

Tikveš district (3 seats)

- Gligorije Anastasijević (DS)
- ? (NRS)
- ? (NRS)

=== Montenegro (7 seats) ===
- Ljubo Bakić (NRS)
- ? (NRS)
- ? (NRS)
- dr Božidar Vuković (DS)
- ? (DS)
- Mihailo Ivanović (Montenegrin Federalist Party)
- Risto Popović (Montenegrin Federalist Party)

=== Vojvodina (34 seats) ===
==== Subotica district (6 seats) ====
- dr Jovan Radonjić (NRS)
- Marko Jurić (NRS)
- Jova Vujić (NRS)
- Blaško Rajić (Bunjevac-Šokac Party)
- Franjo Sudarević (Bunjevac-Šokac Party)
- Milan Sekulić (Socialist Party)

==== Veliki Bečkerek district (7 seats) ====
- dr Momčilo Ninčić (NRS)
- dr Svetislav Mihajlović (NRS)
- Svetozar Stanković (NRS)
- dr Slavko Šećerov (DS)
- dr Vilhelm Najner (German Party)
- Nedeljko Divac (Socialist)
- Dimitrije Vujić (Agrarian)

==== Sombor district (7 seats including Baranja) ====
- Marko Trifković (NRS)
- Joca Lalošević (NRS)
- Pavle Tatić (Socialist)
- Ivan Evetović (Bunjevac-Šokac Party)
- Samuel Šumaher (German Party)
- dr Stevan Kraft (German Party)
- dr Simon Bartman (German Party)

==== Pančevo - Bela Crkva district (8 seats) ====
- dr Žarko Miladinović (NRS)
- dr Milan Stojadinović (NRS)
- Živa Vitolić (NRS)
- dr Dušan Grgin (NRS)
- dr Dušan Bošković (DS)
- Nikola Karać (DS)
- dr Ludvig Kremling (German Party)
- dr Jovan Žan (Romanian Party)

==== Novi Sad district (6 seats) ====
- dr Slavko Miletić (NRS)
- Mita Đorđević (NRS)
- Miloš Katić (NRS)
- dr Janko Šijačić (NRS)
- dr Mozer (German Party)
- dr Franja Trebl (German Party)

=== Croatia (66 seats) ===
==== Modruš-Rijeka electoral district with Krk and Kastav (6 seats) ====
- Croatian Peasant Party - 5 representatives
- Srđan Budisavljević - Democratic Party

==== Požega electoral district (7 seats) ====
- Dragutin Kovačević - Croatian Peasant Party
- Ante Adžija - Croatian Peasant Party
- Ilija Martinović - Croatian Peasant Party
- Ivo Čaldarević - Croatian Peasant Party
- Stjepan Klaić - Croatian Peasant Party
- Nikola Ovanin - Croatian Peasant Party
- Joco Trifunović - Democratic Party

==== Šibenik-Zadar electoral district ====
- Ljubo Jovanović - People's Radical Party
- Nikola Novaković - People's Radical Party
- Uroš Desnica - People's Radical Party
- Mate Goreta - Croatian Peasant Party
- Mate Drinković - Croatian Peasant Party

==== Syrmia electoral district (10 seats) ====
- Croatian Peasant Party - 5 representatives
- Bogdan Milašinović - People's Radical Party
- Dušan Marković - People's Radical Party
- Milan Nedeljković - People's Radical Party
- Vojislav Janjić - People's Radical Party
- Svetislav Popović - Democratic Party

==== Kotor-Dubrovnik-Split electoral district ====
- Croatian Peasant Party - 7 representatives
- People's Radical Party - 2 representatives
- Democratic Party - 1 representative

==== Varaždin electoral district with Međimurje (10 seats) ====
- Croatian Peasant Party - 9 representatives
- Hinko Krizman - Democratic Party

==== Virovitica electoral district (7 seats) ====
- Croatian Peasant Party - 6 representatives
- Jovan Kockar - People's Radical Party

==== Zagreb electoral district (13 seats) ====
- Croatian Peasant Party - 10 representatives
- Valerijana Pribićević - Democratic Party
- Edo Lukinić - Democratic Party
- Dušan Peleš - People's Radical Party

==== City of Zagreb electoral district (2 seats) ====
- Juraj Krnjević - Croatian Peasant Party
- Vinko Trnjar - Croatian Peasant Party
