= 1925 Kingdom of Serbs, Croats and Slovenes parliamentary election =

- 8 February 1925
- All 315 seats in the National Assembly; 158 seats needed for a majority
Party	Leader	Vote %	Seats	+/–
NRS	Nikola Pašić	28.82	123	+15
HSS	Stjepan Radić	22.38	67	−3
DS	Ljubomir Davidović	11.47	36	−15
NRS–SDS	–	8.65	31	
JMO	Mehmed Spaho	5.43	15	−3
SDS	Svetozar Pribićević	4.84	8	New
ZS	Jovan Jovanović Pižon	4.84	4	−6
SLS	Anton Korošec	4.32	20	
NS	Ludwig Kremling	1.85	5	−3
SKS	Ivan Pucelj	0.51	1	0
NB		0.38	1	New
CFS	Sekula Drljević	0.36	3	+1
DFU		0.25	1	New
This lists parties that won seats. See the complete results below.
Prime Minister before	Prime Minister after
Nikola Pašić; NRS	Nikola Pašić; NRS

Parliamentary elections were held in the Kingdom of Serbs, Croats and Slovenes on 8 February 1925. The People's Radical Party remained the largest faction in National Assembly, winning 123 of the 315 seats, with Nikola Pašić remaining prime minister.

== Results ==
Party	Votes	%	Seats	+/–
People's Radical Party	702,573	28.82	123	+15
Croatian Peasant Party	545,466	22.38	67	–3
Democratic Party	279,686	11.47	36	–15
National Bloc (NRS–SDS)	210,843	8.65	31	–
Yugoslav Muslim Organization	132,296	5.43	15	–3
Independent Democratic Party	117,953	4.84	8	New
Agrarian Party	117,922	4.84	4	–6
Slovene People's Party	105,304	4.32	20	–
German Party	45,172	1.85	5	–3
Socialist Party of Yugoslavia	23,457	0.96	0	–2
Republican Party	20,388	0.84	0	0
Independent Workers' Party	16,330	0.67	0	0
Croatian Popular Party	12,482	0.51	0	–
Džemijet	12,468	0.51	0	–14
Independent Agrarian Party	12,332	0.51	1	0
People's Bloc	9,247	0.38	1	New
Montenegrin Federalist Party	8,873	0.36	3	+1
Serbian Party	6,186	0.25	0	–1
Democratic Farmers' Union	6,055	0.25	1	New
Croatian Party of Rights	3,064	0.13	0	0
Bunjevac-Šokac Party	4,679	0.19	0	–
Others	44,821	1.84	0	–
Total	2,437,597	100.00	315	+3
Registered voters/turnout	3,167,659	–		
Source: Nohlen et al.

== Aftermath ==
In April 1926, faced with a series of corruption scandals, Prime Minister Nikola Pašić was forced to resign. A member of Pašić's party Nikola Uzunović became the new prime minister of Yugoslavia on 8 April 1926, however faced with internal conflict within the party, a succession of short term governments, came and went under his watch.

In April 1927 Uzunović resigned from the office of prime minister, after the Croatian Peasant Party decided to leave his government. He was replaced by Velimir Vukićević, who was also a member of People's Radical Party.
