= 1938 Yugoslavian parliamentary election =

← 1935	11 December 1938	1945 →

All 373 seats in the National Assembly 187 seats needed for a majority
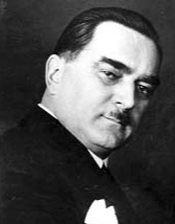

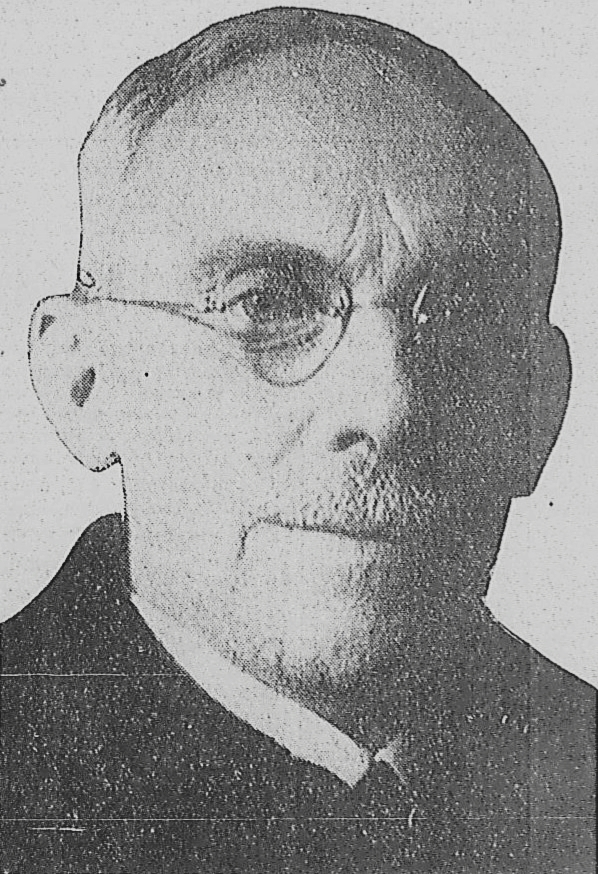
	First party	Second party
Leader	Milan Stojadinović	Vladko Maček
Party	JRZ	HSS
Alliance	JRZ coalition	United Opposition
Last election	60.64%, 303 seats	37.36%, 67 seats
Seats won	306	67
Seat change	▲3	Steady
Popular vote	1,643,783	1,364,524
Percentage	54.09%	44.90%
- Most voted-for list by banovina
Prime Minister before election
Milan Stojadinović
JRZ
Prime Minister after election
Milan Stojadinović
JRZ

Parliamentary elections were held in Yugoslavia on 11 December 1938. The result was a victory for the governing Yugoslav Radical Union, which won 306 of the 373 seats in National Assembly.

These would be the last elections held in Yugoslavia before World War II. By the time of the first postwar elections, in 1945, the Communist Party of Yugoslavia was rapidly consolidating power, and the non-Communist opposition boycotted the vote after claiming to have been targeted with severe intimidation. As a result, the 1938 elections would be the last multi-party elections held in Yugoslavia until the Communists gave up their monopoly of power in 1990.

== Coalitions ==
The Yugoslav Radical Union (JRZ, Jereza) led by PM Milan Stojadinović, formed a right-wing to far-right alliance with:

- Yugoslav National Party led by Bogoljub Jevtić,
- Yugoslav Muslim Organization led by Mehmed Spaho,
- Slovene People's Party led by Anton Korošec and
- People's Radical Party led by Aca Stanojević, which later leaves the alliance in favor of the United Opposition.

The United Opposition alliance consisted of:

- Croatian Peasant Party led by Vladko Maček
- Independent Democratic Party led by Srđan Budisavljević
- Democratic Party led by Ljubomir Davidović
- Agrarian Party led by Jovan Jovanović Pižon
- Montenegrin Federalist Party led by Sekula Drljević

== Results ==
Party	Votes	%	Seats	+/–
Yugoslav Radical Union	1,643,783	54.09	306	+3
United Opposition	1,364,524	44.90	67	0
Yugoslav National Movement	30,734	1.01	0	0
Total	3,039,041	100.00	373	+3
Registered voters/turnout	4,080,286	–		
Source: Nohlen et al.

== Aftermath ==
Although the United Opposition, de facto led by the Croatian Peasant Party leader Maček, had attracted 44.9% of the vote, due to the electoral rules by which the government parties received 40% of the seats in the National Assembly before votes were counted, the opposition vote only translated into 67 seats out of a total of 373. Milan Stojadinović second cabinet collapsed in February 1939, due to his pro-Axis policy. He was replaced by Dragiša Cvetković as Prime Minister and de jure JRZ leader. The Cvetković–Maček Cabinet was concluded in August 1939 establishing autonomous Banovina of Croatia. Maček became the Deputy Prime Minister of Yugoslavia and several members of the United Opposition were added to the new cabinet.

Following the Cvetković government sign Yugoslav accession to the Tripartite Pact in March 1941, there was a faction led by the commander of the Royal Yugoslav Air Force (VVKJ), General Dušan Simović, that successfully realized a pro-Allied coup.

== Sources ==
- Onslow, Sue (March 2005). "Britain and the Belgrade Coup of 27 March 1941 Revisited" (PDF). Electronic Journal of International History (8). University of London: 359–370. ISSN 1471-1443.
- Ramet, Sabrina P. (2006). The Three Yugoslavias: State-Building and Legitimation, 1918–2005. Bloomington, Indiana: Indiana University Press. ISBN 978-0-253-34656-8.
