= 1939 Yugoslavian Senate election =

Senate elections were held in Yugoslavia on 12 November 1939 to elect the 47 elected members of the Senate. The elections were boycotted by the Democratic Party.

== Elected members ==
Constituency	Elected members	Party
Belgrade	Jovan Radonić	Yugoslav Radical Union
Croatia Banovina	Antun Babić	Croatian Peasant Party
Croatia Banovina	Šime Belamarić	Croatian Peasant Party
Croatia Banovina	Islam Filipović	Croatian Peasant Party
Croatia Banovina	Sava Kosanović	Independent Democratic Party
Croatia Banovina	Franja Malčić	Croatian Peasant Party
Croatia Banovina	Antun Pavlović	Croatian Peasant Party
Croatia Banovina	Ivan Pernar	Croatian Peasant Party
Croatia Banovina	Vinko Sarnečić	Croatian Peasant Party
Croatia Banovina	Miho Škvrce	Croatian Peasant Party
Croatia Banovina	Nikola Srdović	Croatian Peasant Party
Croatia Banovina	Niko Subotić	Yugoslav Radical Union
Croatia Banovina	Josip Đido Vuković	Croatian Peasant Party
Croatia Banovina	Večeslav Wilder	Independent Democratic Party
Danube Banovina	Kamenko Božić	Yugoslav Radical Union
Danube Banovina	Joca Georgijević	Yugoslav Radical Union
Danube Banovina	Branko Ilić	Yugoslav Radical Union
Danube Banovina	Ivna Ivandekić	Yugoslav Radical Union
Danube Banovina	Dimitrije Jovanović	Yugoslav Radical Union
Danube Banovina	Milan Kostić	Independent Democratic Party
Danube Banovina	Živan Lukić	Yugoslav Radical Union
Danube Banovina	Milutin Petrović	Radical Group of Božidar Maksimović
Drava Banovina	Janez Brodar	Yugoslav Radical Union
Drava Banovina	Alojzije Miheldžić	Yugoslav Radical Union
Drava Banovina	Fran Schaubach	Yugoslav Radical Union
Drava Banovina	Fran Smoday	Yugoslav Radical Union
Drina Banovina	Bojko Čvrkić	Yugoslav Radical Union
Drina Banovina	Uzeiraga Hadžihasanović	Yugoslav Radical Union
Drina Banovina	Uroš Krulj	Yugoslav Radical Union
Drina Banovina	Miroslav Orešković	Croatian Peasant Party
Drina Banovina	Miloje Rajaković	Yugoslav Radical Union
Morava Banovina	Ljubomir Božinović	Yugoslav Radical Union
Morava Banovina	Sredoje Brkić	Agrarian Party
Morava Banovina	Milan Joksimović	Yugoslav Radical Union
Morava Banovina	Dimitrije Mladenović Grga	Yugoslav Radical Union
Morava Banovina	Dragić Šelmić	Yugoslav Radical Union
Vardar Banovina	Jovan Altiparmaković	Yugoslav Radical Union
Vardar Banovina	Mihailo Kalamatijević	Yugoslav Radical Union
Vardar Banovina	Đura Krdžalić	Radical Group of L. Marković
Vardar Banovina	Xhafer Sylejmani	Radical Group of Božidar Maksimović
Vardar Banovina	Gligorije Tašković	Agrarian Party
Vrbas Banovina	Dušan Milošević	Yugoslav Radical Union
Vrbas Banovina	Nurija Pozderac	Yugoslav Radical Union
Vrbas Banovina	Đorđe Vranasević	Agrarian Party
Zeta Banovina	Tihomir Šarković	Yugoslav Radical Union
Zeta Banovina	Marko Vujačić	Agrarian Party
Zeta Banovina	Đuro Vukotić	Yugoslav Radical Union
Source: Vreme
