= Jovan Jovanović Pižon =

Serbian diplomat and politician (1869–1939)

- Јован Јовановић Пижон
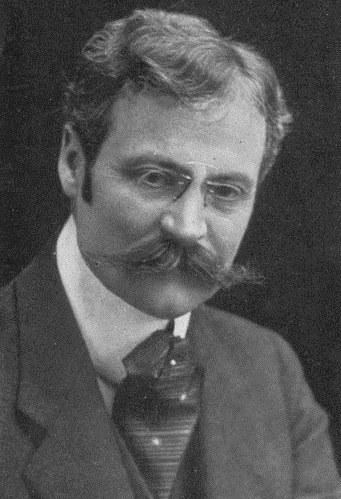

Minister of Foreign Affairs of Serbia
- In office 18 June 1912 – 27 August 1912
- Monarch: Peter I
- Prime Minister: Marko Trifković
- Preceded by: Milovan Milovanović
- Succeeded by: Nikola Pašić

Personal details
- Born: 3 September 1869 Belgrade, Serbia
- Died: 20 June 1939 (aged 69) Ohrid, Yugoslavia (now North Macedonia)
- Party: Agrarian Party
- Education: Great School; University of Paris
- Occupation: Diplomat, politician, writer

Jovan Jovanović Pižon (Serbian Cyrillic: Јован Јовановић Пижон; 3 September 1869 – 20 June 1939) was a Serbian diplomat, politician and writer who served as the Minister of Foreign Affairs of the Kingdom of Serbia from 18 June 1912 to 27 August 1912.

== Biography ==
He was born in Belgrade in 1869, where he finished elementary school and high school, as well as law at the Great School in 1891. He then continued his law studies at the University of Paris, where he acquired a degree. Upon his return in May 1892, he was appointed clerk in the Belgrade Town Court.

He behaved elegantly, with a high collar and in a suit tailored in Parisian fashion. Because of he got the nickname Pižon, which means pigeon in French.

Between 1899 and 1903 he was a clerk to the Embassy of the Kingdom of Serbia in Constantinople, a clerk of the Ministry of Finance (1901-1903) and secretary of the Ministry of Foreign Affairs. He was elected associate professor of the Great School in 1900. During 1903–1904, Jovanovic was in Sofia and served as the charge d'affaires and after a break, in 1906, a diplomat in Athens, where he briefly served as charge d'affaires in the embassy of the Kingdom of Serbia in Greece. In 1907 he worked in Cairo and later he took over the duty of consul in Cetinje in from 1907 to 1909.

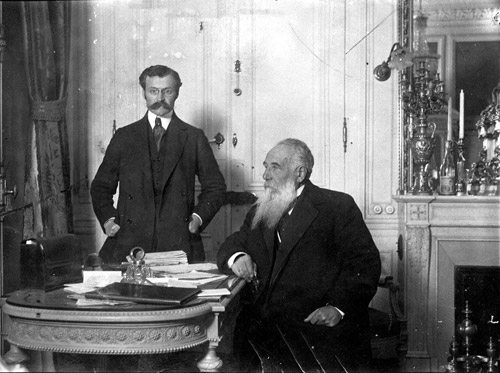
Pižon and Nikola Pašić during WW1.

Along with Svetislav Simić, he was one of the most deserving civil servants for helping and organizing the Serbian Chetnik Organization in Macedonia. He was on the administration of the Serbian consulate in Skopje from July 1909 to 1911. In 1911, he became the head of the department of the Ministry of Foreign Affairs, and a Minister of Foreign Affairs from 18 June 1912 to 27 August 1912. From 1912 to 1914 he was ambassador to Vienna and after that the assistant minister of foreign affairs from 1914 to 1915. He was constantly with Prime Minister Nikola Pašić, with whom he retreated from Niš, via Kraljevo, Raška, Priština, Prizren to Shkodër. After the consolidation of the state leadership in exile, he left the island of Corfu for a new diplomatic mission. He became the ambassador of the Kingdom of Serbia in London from 1915 to 1916 and the ambassador in Washington D.C from 1919 to 1920.

He retired in 1920 at his request as a diplomat in America and upon his return to the new state, the Kingdom of Serbs, Croats and Slovenes, he entered political life. When the Agrarian Party was founded, he joined it, and already in the first elections in 1920, he was elected selected as the ballot carrier of the electoral list in the Banja Luka district and was elected the Member of the National Assembly. In that district, he will be elected as MP in the future elections - 1923, 1925 and 1927. During the 6 January dictatorship, he abstained, and was one of the founders of the United Opposition. He actively returned to political life before the 1935 elections and gained a spot on the list of Vlatko Maček. He was last elected MP once again, also on Maček's opposition list at the 1938 elections in the Oplenac district.

All his life he was an active correspondent of Serbian reputable magazines and a writer. He wrote in the Serbian Literary Gazette under the pseudonym Inostrani (Foreign). He also collaborated with the magazines "Zora", "Delo", "Nova Evropa" and several dailies, "Politika" and others. He also wrote a significant work Southern Serbia, From the End of the 18th century Until the Liberation.

He died in Ohrid on 20 June 1939 when he fell ill during a political conference at the Serbian King Hotel.

His Diary (1896-1920) was published in 2015.
