= People's Socialist Party (Yugoslavia) =

Political organization in the Eastern European country

People's Socialist Party Narodno-socialistična stranka
- Abbreviation: NSS
- Leader: Anton Pesek; Rudolf Juvan
- Founded: 7 December 1919
- Dissolved: 26 February 1928
- Split from: Democratic Party
- Merged into: Independent Democratic Party
- Headquarters: Ljubljana
- Newspaper: Narodni socijalist Jugoslavija
- Youth wing: Jugoslovanska narodno-socialistična mladina
- Ideology: Popular socialism Yugoslav nationalism Slovene interests
- Political position: Centre-left

The People's Socialist Party (Serbian: Narodno-socijalistička stranka, Народно-социјалистичка странка; Slovene: Narodno-socialistična stranka) was a Slovenian political party in the Kingdom of Serbs, Croats, and Slovenes. It was formed through a split from the Yugoslav Democratic Party on 7 December 1919. It aimed towards a specific popular socialism as a third position between liberalism and social democracy. Its leader was Ljubljana's mayor Anton Pesek and they won two seats in the 1920 Kingdom of Serbs, Croats and Slovenes Constitutional Assembly election. The Party closely cooperated with the Czechoslovak National Socialist Party in Czechoslovakia, and during the 1927 elections with the Yugoslav Independent Democratic Party. It advocated Slovenian autonomy within a federalized Yugoslavia.
