= Hakija Hadžić =

Hakija Hadžić (1883–1953) was a Bosnian Muslim politician. He belonged to the group of Muslim politicians from Bosnia, who nationally identified as a Croat and approached the Ustasha movement. Hadžić belonged to a group of Muslim politicians who held pro-Croatian positions in the interwar period.

== Background ==
Hadžić was a Croat from Stolac. He attempted to set up a boarding school but could not gather even twenty prospective students to do so, in contrast to the Serbian Muslim society Gajret, which had over 300 students at the time.

== Interwar period ==
Hadžić was a politician who had the strongest influence on the Muslim population of Yugoslavia before the Second World War. Before the 1938 elections Hadžić established a new political party (Croatian Muslim Peasant Party) which had received very modest support at the elections.

== Second World War ==
As a personal friend of Ante Pavelić, he promoted Ustaša politics in regions of Herzegovina and Bosnia. Hadžić thanked Pavelić for the establishment of NDH, while Pavelić appointed Hadžić as his Commissioner for Bosnia. Hadžić was Muslim Ustaša with highest rank in Sarajevo. Alija Nametak described Hadžić as one of the extreme Croats, to distinguish them from people for whom their Croatian ethnic identity was less emphatic.

Group of Muslims around Hadžić were the strongest proponents of annexation of Sandžak into Independent State of Croatia(NDH). This was also supported by NDH government, as they thought that Sandžak is part of the same region as Bosnia and Herzegovina. In May of 1941, NDH forces occupied northern Sandžak, and new local administrations in the occupied area were appointed by Hadžić, and it consisted of either Bosnian Muslims or reliable local collaborators. In then municipality of Pljevlja the new government transferred 1,5 million dinars from the budget to Sarajevo for 'safe keeping'. The new authorities adopted Ustaše racial laws on Hadžić's orders and started to discriminate against the Serbian population, but because of the German occupiers they were unable to fully implement or act on their policies. This occupation was short-lived as after negotiations in July 1941 with Italy territory of Sandžak occupied by NDH forces was given to the Italian occupiers and the new Serbian collaborator state.

Hadžić claimed that he challenged Mehmed Spaho to a duel, while both of them were in Vienna, but Spaho refused to appear. Hadžić denounced Džafer Kulenović too, although he also had a prominent position in the NDH.

== Sources ==
- Greble, Emily (23 February 2011). Sarajevo 1941–1945: Muslims, Christians, and Jews in Hitler's Europe. Cornell University Press. p. 80. ISBN 978-0-8014-6121-7.
- Kamberović, Husnija (2009). Mehmed Spaho (1883-1939): Politička biografija (in Bosnian). Vijeće Kongresa bošnjačkih intelektualaca. ISBN 9789958471094.
- Živković, Milutin (2017). Санџак 1941-1943 [Sanžak 1941-1943] (in Serbo-Croatian). Belgrade: University of Belgrade.
