= Srđan Budisavljević =

Politician and lawyer in Croatia-Slavonia and Yugoslavia

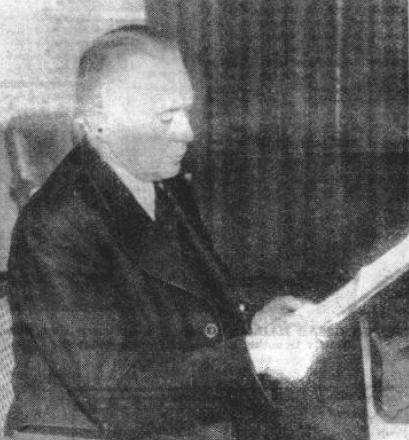
- Born: 8 December 1883; Požega, Croatia-Slavonia, Austria-Hungary (modern Croatia)
- Died: 20 February 1968 (aged 84); Zagreb, SR Croatia, SFR Yugoslavia
- Education: University of Zagreb; Humboldt University of Berlin
- Occupations: Politician, lawyer
- Political party: Croat-Serb Coalition (until 1920); Democratic Party (1920–1925); Independent Democratic Party (1925–1945)

Srđan Budisavljević (8 December 1883 – 20 February 1968) was a politician and lawyer.

== Biography ==
Born in Požega, Budisavljević studied law in Zagreb and Berlin before being elected to the Sabor of the Kingdom of Croatia-Slavonia in 1908 as a representative of the Croat-Serb Coalition led by Frano Supilo and Svetozar Pribičević. Budisavljević was appointed the interior minister of the new the government of Croatia-Slavonia. In 1918, Budisavljević was among founders and the secretary of the National Council of Slovenes, Croats and Serbs – a body composed of political representatives of the South Slavs living in Austria-Hungary tasked with achieving independence of South Slavic lands from the empire. In the same year he launched the Glas Slovenaca, Hrvata i Srba ("Voice of Slovenes, Croats and Serbs") journal. Budisavljević was elected to the Parliament of Yugoslavia on the Democratic Party ticket in 1920 and 1923 before switching his allegiance to Pribičević-led Independent Democratic Party (SDS) in 1925. He was a member of the parliament representing the SDS, and the president of the SDS in 1939–1945. In the same period he held several ministerial positions in Yugoslav governments including the government-in-exile during the World War II. Following the Tito–Šubašić Agreements, King Peter II of Yugoslavia appointed Budisavljević a member of three-person regency council to represent him in the Democratic Federal Yugoslavia. In 1945, Budisavljević returned to Yugoslavia and lived in Zagreb until his death. In 1958, he published Stvaranje države Srba, Hrvata i Slovenaca ("Creation of the state of Serbs, Croats and Slovenes").

Budisavljević's father Buda was an ethnic Serb politician from Lika. His brother Julije was a noted surgeon, married to Diana, a war-time humanitarian.
