= Yugoslav Muslim People's Organization =

Bosniak political party in the Kingdom of Serbs, Croats and Slovenes

Yugoslav Muslim People's Organization (Serbo-Croatian: Jugoslavenska muslimanska narodna organizacija) was a Bosniak political party in the Kingdom of Serbs, Croats and Slovenes with pro-Serbian tendencies. It was founded in 1922 by initiative of the Serbian governing parties, substituting the Yugoslav Muslim Organization as their Bosnian ally. JMNO did however fail to overtake the leading role amongst Bosnian Muslims from JMO.
