= Montenegrin Federalist Party =

Montenegrin Federalist Party Crnogorska federalistička stranka Црногорска федералистичка странка
- Leaders: Sekula Drljević; Mihailo Ivanović; Krsto Popović
- Founded: 1923
- Dissolved: 1945
- Preceded by: Montenegrin Greens
- Headquarters: Cetinje
- Ideology: Montenegrin nationalism Yugoslav federalism Agrarianism; National conservatism After 1939: Montenegrin separatism Italian fascism Collaborationism
- Political position: Right-wing to far-right
- Slogan: For the Right, Honour and Freedom of Montenegro

Party flag

The Montenegrin Federalist Party (Serbo-Croatian: Crnogorska federalistička stranka, Црногорска федералистичка странка, CFS), sometimes known simply as the Montenegrin Party, was a Montenegrin political party in the Kingdom of Yugoslavia which stood for preservation of Montenegrin autonomy and a decentralized federalised Yugoslavia. It pursued the ideology of the Greens who lost the Christmas Uprising, but in a peaceful and democratic manner. Its best known leader was Sekula Drljević.

== Ideology ==
The Montenegrin Federalist Party initially gathered Montenegrin nationalists, Greens, supporters of the dethroned Petrović-Njegoš dynasty and opponents of the loss of Montenegrin statehood. However, soon upon its formation, the party split in two factions. The first faction gathered royalists, mostly older conservative politicians who served for King Nicholas I and wanted the restoration of independence of the Montenegrin Monarchy.

The second faction, led by Mihailo Ivanović and Savo Vuletić, accepted the unification of South Slavs, but were opposed to the centralisation, and advocated federalism. This federalist faction included the group led by Sekula Drljević, which later split into third fraction and became gradually more extreme, which finally led to its cooperation with Ustashe.

The most important Montenegrin Federalist party stronghold was in Katunska nahija, a mountainous region of Old Montenegro including Cetinje, Njeguši, Ćeklići, Bjelice, Cuce, Ozrinići, Rudine, Grahovo, Pješivci, Zagarač and Komani. This region had the largest proportion of Montenegrin separatists and opponents of the annexation of Montenegro into Yugoslavia, and was subject to repression by the royal government. The party also had notable support in Crmnica and Riječka nahija.

== History ==
=== Early years (1923–1929) ===
After the abolition of divisional historical entities in 1922, when most of Montenegro became a part of the Zeta Oblast, Sekula Drljević and other prominent supporters of the dethroned Montenegrin king-in-exile Nicholas I gathered and organized a political party to pursue their goals of a distinct Montenegrin autonomy for its preservation within the Yugoslav monarchy, centering on federalization of the state. The party sought a peaceful way to resolve the Montenegrin national question, contrary to more radical Greens which used guerrilla tactics following the Christmas Uprising.

Montenegrin Federalist Party gradually voiced its support of the self-styled Montenegrin Army in Exile, and its members filled the party ranks after the Greens officially disbanded in 1926. Montenegrin Federalist Party ran in elections in 1923 with a campaign of promoting Montenegrin interests within the new state. Federalists came second in the election, with only 228 votes less than the People's Radical Party. In the next election held in 1925 Montenegrin Federalist Party came first. The party was officially established at the congress held on 4 October 1925, when the party programme was also adopted. During its early years, Montenegrin Federalists cooperated with the Communist Party of Yugoslavia, with common goals of federalisation and obtaining autonomy for Montenegro. The two parties ran in coalition in 1926 local elections. In 1927, Montenegrin Federalist Party agreed a coalition with the Croatian Peasant Party. Afterwards, the party joined the Croatian Peasant Party and the Independent Democratic Party in the Peasant-Democratic Coalition and became a minor coalition member.

=== Dictatorship and radicalisation (1929–1939) ===
In 1929, King Alexander established a dictatorship, officially changing the name of the country to Kingdom of Yugoslavia. All political parties were banned, and Montenegrin federalists cooperated with communists, and even plotted an armed insurgence against the regime.

However, after the king's assassination in Marseille in 1934, the new government wanted pacification, so they rehabilitated and released the imprisoned former Green rebel Novica Radović, who became the chief ideologue of the Montenegrin Federalist Party. The party pointed out that Montenegro unjustly lost its independence because of Serbia and the Allies, and claimed that Montenegro, rather than Serbia, was the leader among Yugoslavs and called upon the Montenegrin historical statehood. By 1938, the party joined the United Opposition, closely associated with Vladko Maček, which united entire Yugoslav opposition bent on establishing a more democratic society. Gradually Montenegrin Federalist Party became more radical and distanced from its original views, becoming a supporter of an independent Montenegro and a promoter of extreme Montenegrin nationalism. Afterwards it became much more radical in its pursuits and associated mostly with the Croatian Party of Rights, and much more rarely with the Serbian opposition. Montenegrin Party remained in opposition to every other Yugoslav force after the Cvetković-Maček Agreement in 1939, and anticipated World War II as a way to gain power.

=== World War II, collaboration and dissolution (1939–1945) ===
Following the April War and the occupation of Yugoslavia by the Axis forces, Montenegrin Federalist Party offered to collaborate with the Italian Fascists, demanding a "Greater Montenegro" from Neretva river in Herzegovina to Mata in Albania; it would also include Metohija and Sandžak. A much smaller "Kingdom of Montenegro" was proclaimed on Saint Peter's Day Assembly on 12 July 1941, with the territorial claims of the Ustaše and Albanians being relatively more favoured by the Nazis. Nicholas' grandson and successor as heir to the throne, Prince Michael of Montenegro, was invited to be its King and head of state, but he vigorously refused claiming that he would not cooperate with Nazis. The restored Montenegro lost Metohija and its eastern lands to a Greater Albania, but managed to gain the Serbian part of Sandžak. All other political parties were outlawed and a dictatorship under Sekula Drljević under Italian protection was proclaimed. A number of party members, headed by Novica Radović, opposed this decision, because the territorial claims were not accepted and it failed to reinstate the Petrović-Njegoš dynasty.

The party split in two factions, with a most extremist one opposing the new state borders of Montenegro, especially vis-à-vis Albania, and claiming the territory of the Bay of Kotor. This wing had links to an extent with the communist Partisans, in order to assist a rebellion against the Italians and Ustaše in the Bay of Kotor, as well as when assistance was needed to fend off the royalist collaborationist Chetniks, who managed to get more control in Montenegro, and with whom Partisans were in a civil war.

Only a day after the puppet state of Montenegro was proclaimed, Partisans staged the 13 July Uprising, and the Montenegrin Federalist Army went to exile. It reorganised in Zagreb, the Independent State of Croatia's capital, as the Montenegrin State Council aimed at eventually creating an independent and large national state of the Montenegrin people. It associated itself with the Ustaše and aided their regime.

In 1945, Montenegrin Federalist Party formed its own Montenegrin People's Army out of former Chetniks led by Pavle Đurišić who broke his allegiance to Draža Mihailović and wanted to retreat to Slovenia in return for nominal recognition of Drljević's movement. However, this alliance between Drljević and Đurišić was short-lived and ended with Battle of Lijevče Field between the Ustaše and Đurišić's troops. With the impending Allied victory in 1945, the party dispersed, retreating with other Axis collaborators in late 1945 after its own Montenegrin Army turned against it.

== Elections ==
Year	Popular vote	% of popular vote	Coalition	Overall seats won	Montenegrin seats won	Seat change	Government
1923	8,561	0.4%	—	2 / 315	2 / 8	▲2	opposition
1925	8,873	0.3%	—	3 / 315	3 / 8	▲1	opposition
1927	5,153	0.2%	—	1 / 315	1 / 8	▼2	opposition
1931	banned		—	0 / 370	—	▼1	no seats
1935	banned		—	0 / 370	—	—	no seats
1938	1,364,524	44.9%	United Opposition	2 / 373	—	▲2	opposition

== See also ==
- Italian governorate of Montenegro
