= Blaško Rajić =

Croatian Catholic priest, writer and politician

Blaško Stipan Rajić (January 7, 1878 – January 3, 1951) was a Catholic priest, writer and politician from the region of Bačka who was known for his involvement in the creation of Yugoslavia after the Croatian national revival. He wrote poetry and prose works.

== Biography ==
Rajić was born in Subotica and attended elementary school there, while his middle school education (gymnasium) and studium (theology) he had in Kalocsa.

After ending the study, he became priest on June 24, 1902. His area of service was the region of Bačka, which at the time was a southern part of Austria-Hungary, and he served in villages with numerous Croat inhabitants. First, he was the chaplain in Dusnok, where he stayed for few years. There he fought against Nasarenism.

In 1904 he's transferred to another village with numerous Croat inhabitants in southern Austria-Hungary, Hercegszántó. There he has remained for three years. After chaplainship in Hercegszántó, the service brought him back to his Subotica, where he was the chaplain until 1911.

After World War I, Bačka became part of newly created Kingdom of Serbs, Croats and Slovenes.

Later he became the vicar in Subotica, and on that service he remained until his death in 1951.

He's the author of the prayer book Duhovna mana.

=== Political work ===
He early joined Illyrian movement, (Croatian national revival) along with Bačka Croats and Ivan Antunović. After the death of priest Pajo Kujundžić in 1915, another Croat from Bačka, Rajić took the lead role among Croat priests in Bačka.

He has engaged himself intensely to pull Bačka into unified South Slavic country. Because of it, he travelled abroad and even participated at a Peace Conference in Paris. After seeing how things have developed after 1918, he was disappointed in his political views.

On September 22, 1919 he was a participant of the delegation of Bunjevci that went to Paris on conference to talk with foreign diplomats. Rajić said himself, that he went into politics because the circumstances forced him to, all to help his Croat people.

Later, he was a leader of Bunjevac-Šokac Party (Bunjevačko-šokačka stranka), and after disagreements with party leadership, he led People's party of Vojvodina (Vojvođanska pučka stranka), and later he turned to Croatian leader Stjepan Radić, whose party, HSS, Rajić resiliently supported.

During World War II, his activity was interrupted. He was arrested and imprisoned on April 12, 1941. Greater Hungarian circles couldn't forgive him his struggle for separating Bačka and merging it to unified South Slavic state. Hungarian extremists have imprisoned him into the caserne of cavalry in Subotica, where they've tortured him. He was pulled out of there thanks to intercession of Croatian episcopate and Dr. Alojzije Stepinac.

With the mediation of Vatican, he was interned on May 25, 1941 in Franciscan monastery in Budapest. He returned to his previous service in Subotica in April 1943, and that way remained until its death in 1951.

His contemporaries witnessed about him as deep thinker and as a person with firm beliefs and attitudes.

He was the editor of the Croatian-language magazine from Subotica, Naše novine, the organ of Land's Christian Socialist Party (Zemaljska kršćansko-socijalna stranka).

== Rajić and Croat national revival ==
He was known by his persisting on Croat national consciousness of Bunjevci.

When he was in Zagreb April 23, 1939, leading the 50 deputies of Bunjevci and Šokci from Bačka, he said (and next day it was in Hrvatski dnevnik newspaper): ”Bunjevci i Šokci u Bačkoj... priznaju se za česti i uda onoga naroda koji živi u Međimurju, u Zagorju, u Lici pod Velebitom, na Hrvatskom Primorju, koji s nama isti jezik govori, najvećim dijelom istu vjeru ispovijeda, odgojen na grudima iste kulture, iz koje je ustao Ante Starčević i Stjepan Radić. Priznajemo se za česti hrvatskoga naroda, s kojim želimo dijeliti sudbinu u borbi i pregaranju za sve, što je Bog svakom narodu namijenio za čestiti, sretan i pravedan narodni život...".

Same year, on November 10, 1939, on a celebration organized on a subject of secession of Subotica from the Kingdom of Hungary, he said (and next day it stated in Zagrebačke novosti: "Izrekli smo nebrojeno puta jasno i glasno i to su svi morali čuti, da smo mi Bunjevci članovi hrvatskoga naroda... Ne samo voljom, već i svim silama nastojat ćemo da... svi mi Bunjevci ostanemo, što smo od iskona bili, Hrvati Bunjevci u sklopu današnje države...".

He wrote *Bunjevčice: crtice iz života bunjevačkih Hrvata, Hrv. knjiž. društvo sv. Jeronima, Zagreb, 1937.

== Literature ==
- Geza Kikić: Antologija proze bunjevačkih Hrvata, Matica Hrvatska, Zagreb, 1971.
- Geza Kikić: Antologija poezije bunjevačkih Hrvata, Matica Hrvatska, Zagreb, 1971.
