= German Party (Yugoslavia) =

German Party Nemačka stranka
- German name: Partei der Deutschen
- Founded: 1922
- Banned: 1929
- Ideology: German minority interests

The German Party (German: Partei der Deutschen) was a political party of Germans in the Kingdom of Serbs, Croats and Slovenes. The party was formed in 1922 and participated in elections until it was banned following Yugoslav king Alexander I's dictatorship of 6 January 1929.

== History ==
The German Party was founded in Žombolj, then part of Serbia, Kingdom of Serbs, Croats, and Slovenes, in response to a proposed land reform that would have excluded ethnic Germans and to ensure that there would be German representation on the land reform commissions. They initially had representation in the National Assembly through a Dr Wanek who gained attention for alleging that the Minister of Finance was giving insider information to banks prior to official announcements of proposed changes to finance legislation. In the 1923 Kingdom of Serbs, Croats and Slovenes parliamentary election, the German Party won eight seats in the National Assembly. In the 1925 Kingdom of Serbs, Croats and Slovenes parliamentary election, the German Party lost three seats, returning five members of the National Assembly. The German Party had a close relationship with the Kulturbund but when the German Party started supporting the Croatian Peasant Party in parliament, the Serbian-majority government banned the Kulturbund on the grounds that it created "pan-German propaganda against the state" but this ban was lifted at the behest of King Alexander I of Yugoslavia in 1927. In the 1927 Kingdom of Serbs, Croats and Slovenes parliamentary election, they regained a seat and returned six parliamentarians.

When King Alexander declared the 6 January Dictatorship in 1929, he forced all political parties with a national referent to be dissolved, including the German Party. Following the dissolution of the German Party, the Yugoslav Parliament allocated reserved seats for the German minority.

== Performance by election ==
- 1923 – 43,415 votes, 8 of 312 seats
- 1925 – 45,117 votes, 5 of 315 seats
- 1927 – 49,849 votes, 6 of 315 seats

== See also ==
- Germany–Yugoslavia relations
