= Croatian Popular Party (1919) =

Croatian Popular Party Hrvatska pučka stranka
- Founded: 1919
- Dissolved: 1929
- Headquarters: Zagreb
- Ideology: Political Catholicism Yugoslavism

Croatian Popular Party (Croatian: Hrvatska pučka stranka, pronounced [xř̩ʋaːtskaː pûːt͡ʃka strâŋka]) was a minor political party that acted as a political branch of the Croatian Catholic Movement and it existed between 1919 and 1929 in the Kingdom of Serbs, Croats and Slovenes. Until Stjepan Radić's assassination in National Assembly in Belgrade in 1928, the Croatian Catholic Movement was pro-Yugoslav, and after the assassination pro-Croatian within Yugoslavia. However, after the failure of the Yugoslav government to implement the concordate with the Holy See, the Croatian Catholic Movement became strictly pro-Croatian.

The HPS was established by the main organ of the Croatian Catholic Movement, the Croatian Catholic Seniorate (HKS). The HPS was active in all parts of Yugoslavia where Croatian Catholics were present, excluding Vojvodina, where a political party with an identical programme, the Bunjevac-Šokac Party (BŠS) was active. The programme of the HPS was based on Christian principles. For this reason, its political opponents, including the Croatian Republican Peasant Party (HRSS), viewed it as clericalist, though the party saw itself as populist.

At the 1920 elections for the Constitutional Assembly, the party achieved relative success, winning 46,599 votes and nine seats. Together with the Slovene People's Party (SLS) and the BŠS, the HPS formed the Yugoslav bloc in the Constitutional Assembly. The mandate of the Constitutional Assembly ended with the enactment of the new constitution on 21 June 1921, however, by the decree of Alexander I of Yugoslavia, it was transformed to a legislative parliament.

The ruling coalition of Nikola Pašić, made of the Radicals (NRS) and the Democrats, was in crisis. Pašić gave a resignation of the coalition government and on 16 December 1921 formed a new government made entirely of the Radicals. The King dismissed the National Assembly and announced the elections for 13 March 1923.

The parties of the Yugoslav bloc, awaiting the new election, issued a joint declaration on 22 December 1922, attacking the Croatian bloc led by the HRSS of Stjepan Radić and his "tactic of parliamentary abstinence" considering it to be counter-productive. The HPS decided to enter the election campaign under the slogan "Parliamentary struggle", contrasting the HRSS and insisting to continue the political struggle within the National Assembly. The main goal was to win the Croatian votes and reduce Radić's success among the Croatian voters.

The HPS was open to and supported the joint Croatian election list, viewing that in cooperation with other Croatian political parties, they can enact an electoral law that would suit the Croatian voters. However, they claimed that after the election, each party can act independently. In the terms of the parliamentary activity, the HPS viewed that it should be part of the Yugoslav bloc, and only from there to form wider political coalitions. On 3 January 1923, the main Croatian political parties, the HRSS, the HPS and the HZ, agreed to compete jointly in the election. The elections for the HPS ended in catastrophe, with the HPS winning only 18,402 votes and no seats. The HRSS won 473,733 votes and 70 seats.
