= Independent Agrarian Party =

Political party in the Kingdom of Yugoslavia

The Independent Agrarian Party (Slovene: Samostojna kmetijska stranka, SKS) was a Slovenian political party in the Kingdom of Serbs, Croats and Slovenes. It was active between 1919 and 1926, when it merged with the Slovenian Agrarian Labour Republican Party into the Slovenian Peasant's Party. In the early 1920s, it was the second largest party in Slovenia, after the Slovene People's Party.

The party was founded in 1919. It was initially meant as the rural branch of the largely urban Yugoslav Democratic Party. However, it soon became fully independent. The party was mostly supported by wealthy farmers and the rural middle class. In the elections for the Yugoslav constitutional assembly of 1920, it gained 21% of the votes in Slovenia, thus becoming the second largest Slovenian party, after the Slovene People's Party, and it gained eight of the 38 Slovenian seats in the Yugoslav Parliament. In the municipal elections of 1921, the Independent Agrarian Party maintained approximately the same percentage of votes, and managed to defeat the Slovene People's Party in several districts of southern Slovenia (Lower Carniola and White Carniola) and in the Celje region.

In the discussions on the Yugoslav constitution in 1921, the party adopted a rigidly centralist attitude. As the majority of the Slovenian population at the time supported some sort of territorial autonomy for Slovenia, this decision proved very damaging for the party's future success. In the parliamentary elections of 1923, the party suffered a severe defeat, losing more than half of its votes, gaining around 9% of the Slovenian votes, and only one MP in the Yugoslav Parliament. In the 1925 elections, the party did not manage to improve its result.

After the defeat of 1925, the party gradually shifted its program. It formed an alliance with the left wing Slovenian Agrarian Labour Republican Party of Albin Prepeluh, and adopted a program which was more favourable to Slovenian autonomy within Yugoslavia. In 1926, the two parties merged in the Slovene Peasant Party, which inherited the organization structure of the Independent Agrarian Party, but whose program and ideology was much closer to the left wing agrarianism advocated by Prepeluh's Agrarian Labour Republican Party.

== Prominent members ==
- Ivan Pucelj
- Drago Marušič
- Bogumil Vošnjak

== See also ==
- History of Slovenia
- Liberalism in Slovenia
