= Yugoslav Republican Party =

Political party in Yugoslavia (1920–1929)

Yugoslav Republican Party Jugoslovenska republikanska stranka Југословенска републиканска странка
- Leader: Ljubomir Stojanović
- Founded: 1920
- Dissolved: 1929
- Headquarters: Belgrade, Yugoslavia
- Ideology: Republicanism; Federalism; Liberalism

The Yugoslav Republican Party (Serbian: Југословенска републиканска странка), was a party in the Kingdom of Serbs, Croats and Slovenes active between 1920 and 1929. Founded by a group of liberal intellectuals as the Republican Democratic Party (Републиканска демократска странка) on 21 January 1920, it changed name on the congress held on 27 January 1921. It supported federalization of the state. The leader was Ljubomir Stojanović. In the 1920 Constitutional Assembly elections it received 18,136 votes (1.1%) and 3 seats; in the 1923 parliamentary election it received 18,941 (0.9%) and lost its seats, never managing to win seats in the 1925 and 1927 elections. It was dissolved after the 6 January Dictatorship (1929).

== Election results ==
Year	Votes	%	Seats
1920	18,136	1.1%	3
1923	18,941	0.9%	0
1925	20,388	0.8%	0
1927	6,122	0.3%	0

== Sources ==
- Dragan Subotić (1998). Srpske političke stranke i pokreti u 19. i 20. veku: Političke stranke i pokreti u političkom životu međuratne Srbije (i Jugoslavije) (1918.-1941.). Primeri iz političke istorije, kulture i sociologije političkih partija. In-t za političke studije. ISBN 9788674190289.
