= Mehmed Spaho =

Bosnian politician (1883–1939)

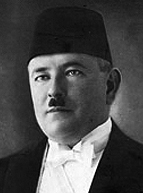

Minister of Trade and Industry of the Kingdom of Yugoslavia
- In office 26 March 1921 – 1 June 1921

Minister of Forestry and Mining of the Kingdom of Yugoslavia
- In office 22 December 1918 – 23 February 1919

Personal details
- Born: 13 March 1883 Sarajevo, Bosnia and Herzegovina, Austria-Hungary (now Bosnia and Herzegovina)
- Died: 29 June 1939 (aged 56) Belgrade, Yugoslavia (now Serbia)
- Citizenship: Yugoslavia
- Spouse: Habiba
- Education: University of Vienna
- Awards: Order of Franz Joseph (Knight Cross)

Mehmed Spaho (Serbian Cyrillic: Мехмед Спахо; 13 March 1883 – 29 June 1939) was a Bosnian Muslim politician and leader of the Yugoslav Muslim Organization.

== Early life ==
Spaho was born in Sarajevo, at the time part of Austria-Hungary, into a family of coppersmiths. His father, Hasan, was an expert in Sharia law, and before the Austrian-Hungarian occupation, he served as a judge in the Ottoman cities of Jajce, Sofia, Damascus and Cairo. His mother was Fatima (née Bičakčić). Spaho had three sisters, Behija, Aiša and Habiba, and two brothers, Fehim, a prominent imam, and Mustafa.

Spaho attended elementary school in Sarajevo, where he was a good student. In 1906, I graduated from the Faculty of Law at the University of Vienna. At the end of 1907, he passed the doctoral exam, and on 7 February 1908, he was officially named Dr. iur. In Vienna, Spaho was a member of an organisation called "Zvijezda" (the Star), which gathered Muslim students. This organisation promoted a closer cooperation between Serbs and Bosnian Muslims. Pro-Croat oriented Hakija Hadžić claimed that he challenged Spaho to a duel while both were in Vienna, but Spaho refused to appear.

When he returned from Vienna in 1906, Spaho worked as a court clerk until 1908. In 1910, he became a lawyer clerk for Josef Fischer. When the Commercial Chamber was established in Sarajevo in 1910, at its session held on 11 November 1910, Spaho was elected its secretary with an annual salary of 6,000 kronas; he began work on 1 January 1911. During that time, he had an ambition to enter the Diet of Bosnia, along with another group of Muslims educated outside Bosnia and Herzegovina. His group eventually failed to gain entry to the Diet. In 1914, Spaho was elected to the Sarajevo City Council, after his political associate and friend, Esad Kulović, stepped down. By this, Spaho dealt with both economics and politics.

== World War I ==
Bosnian Muslim leadership was divided at the outbreak of World War I in August 1914. One part supported the autonomy of Bosnia and Herzegovina within Austria-Hungary, another part saw Bosnia and Herzegovina as part of Hungary. In contrast, others saw it united with Croatia. The idea about Yugoslavism was not yet present, for the Bosnian Muslim political elite had not even entertained such thoughts until the final months of World War I. Spaho first articulated the pan-Yugoslavist sentiment in the Bosnian Muslim community. Spaho was not a significant politician at this point. On 15 February 1918, he stated in the Novosti magazine that the salvation of Bosnian Muslims was only within the "unity of all Serbs, Croats and Slovenes".

During the war, Spaho entered a mission of the Council of Nutrition of Bosnia and Herzegovina, led by Governor Stjepan Sarkotić. As a member of the mission, Spaho travelled on 4 March 1918 to meet the Prime Minister of Hungary, Sándor Wekerle, to whom Spaho explained the hard food situation in Bosnia and Herzegovina. This mission was also received by the Minister of War, Rudolf Stöger-Steiner von Steinstätten, to whom Spaho explained the Memorandum of Peoples of Bosnia and Herzegovina in which it was explained that the requests made on requisition of cattle, hay, straw, wool etc. were undue. The next day, the mission was received by Ernst Seidler von Feuchtenegg, the Prime Minister of Austria. Spaho asked von Feuchtenegg to approve more potatoes for planting to be sent in Bosnia and Herzegovina. On 10 March, the mission was received by the Emperor, Charles I, whom Spaho asked to help to the people of Bosnia and Herzegovina with the food problem. He ended his request by praising the soldiers from Bosnia and Herzegovina who fought "heroically, on all fronts".

Because of his loyalty towards the monarchy, Spaho was decorated with the Order of Franz Joseph with a Knight Cross on 2 May 1918 in Sarajevo. During the time, Spaho still did not support Yugoslavism, but only in Sarkotić's telegram to the Emperor from 23 September 1918, Spaho was marked as a supporter of Yugoslavism. Sarkotić's motive to make such telegram occurred after István Tisza, Hungarian Prime Minister visited Sarajevo. While in Sarajevo, Tisza spoke with the President of Diet of Bosnia, Safvet-beg Bašagić, and Spaho, as with Secretary of the Commercial Chamber, and a lawyer, Dr. Halid Hrasnica. In that conversation, Bašagić claimed that it would be the best for Bosnia and Herzegovina to unite with other Croatian lands, or if that would not be possible, at least to gain autonomy; Spaho and Hrasnica both disagreed and claimed it would be the best if Bosnia and Herzegovina would become a part of Yugoslavia. Spaho complained to Tisza about Austrian-Hungarian treatment of Bosnian Muslims during the war, as they recruited, he claimed, elderly and the children and he complained about the procedure conducted in the requisition. He also stated that the differences between the religious groups in Bosnia and Herzegovina had faded during the war, and claimed that the majority of population supports the unification within Yugoslavia. After Tisza ended the meeting with the Bosnian Muslim delegation, he met with the representatives of Serbs who gave him the Memorandum in which it was stated that Croats, Serbs and Slovenes demand a united Yugoslav state. Three years later, Spaho complained to the Parliament in Belgrade that he was bypassed when this Memorandum was signed, even though he supported the same idea.

== State of Slovenes, Croats and Serbs ==
In the October 1918, Spaho, nevertheless, supported the Memorandum which was given to Tisza by Croat and Serb representatives. On 13 October 1918, Spaho called the session of Bosnian Muslim intellectuals to discuss their support for the Yugoslav state, but instead of a session, a group of Muslim intellectuals, among which was Spaho also, stated that they will not make any announcements without the approval of the National Assembly of Slovenes, Croats and Serbs. This statement made Spaho to enter the Plenum of the National Council of Slovenes, Croats and Serbs. Spaho was one of the two Bosnian Muslims to be a member. Even though other Bosnian Muslims later supported the Yugoslav state, Spaho was the one to be prioritized.

On 3 November 1918, when the first National Government of Bosnia and Herzegovina was formed, Spaho was named Commissioner for Trade, Post and Telegraph. As a Commissioner, Spaho was very active, especially with helping Bosnian Muslim families that were victims of violence before the State of Slovenes, Croats and Serbs united with the Kingdom of Serbia. Some ministers in the National Government demanded that the help must be offered to all victims, however, Spaho insisted that the victims that were victims of violence after 1 November 1918 must be prioritized, mainly Bosnian Muslims in East Bosnia.

== Kingdom of Serbs, Croats and Slovenes ==
When the first government of the Kingdom of Yugoslavia was formed on 22 December 1918, whose president was Stojan Protić, Spaho was named Minister of Forestry and Mining. Spaho entered the Government as a representative of the Muslim religious group, and stayed in it until 23 February 1919, when he resigned.

Political gathering of Bosnian Muslims was mostly around the political newspapers that were published after the war. There were two major newspapers, the Vrijeme (the Time) and the Jednakost (the Equality). The political group that gathered around the Vrijeme was called the "Muslim Organization", to which Spaho belonged. They emphasized their programme on 8 January 1919, advocating democracy, constitutionality, justice and harmony, and moreover, they announced their readiness to cooperate with everyone with the construction of the "unique state of Serbs, Croats and Slovenes", on the concept of equality of all three nationalities. The Yugoslav Muslim Organization (JMO), as it will be named, demanded protection of Islamic religious rights and protection of Muslims by the Constitution. The JMO was more of a religious group, then a political party. They also demanded that all land must be given to each in order to secure one's existence and to protect large landowners, as that is, according to them, the interest of the state. Not just they demanded the protection of large landowners, who were the Bosnian Muslim beys, but they also requested retention of the serfs. The JMO also favoured decentralization of the state. As opposed to the JMO, the political group that gathered around the Jednakost newspaper, the Yugoslav Muslim Democracy (JMD), did not deal with either religious or agrarian questions, but only demanded that the power must be transferred more to the local level; nevertheless, they also supported the Karađorđević dynasty and Belgrade centralism. The Yugoslav Muslim Organization was officially established on 16 February 1919. All Bosnian Muslim organizations were united within it, except the Jednakost group, which joined Svetozar Pribićević's Yugoslav Democratic Party. At its foundation, Spaho was not a member of the JMO, but he was a member of the Vrijeme political group, although not among its key persons. As a minister in the first government, Spaho could not influence the founding of the JMO. The JMO's first president was a mufti from Tuzla, Ibrahim Maglajlić. Spaho became a member of the JMO in May 1919.

In the same year, Spaho entered the Provisional National Office (PNO) in Belgrade. He was among 10 Bosnian Muslim representatives. Before the first session of the PNO, Spaho resigned from Ministry of Forestry and Mining due to his disagreement with the decisions of the Government, as the Government only took away the land of the Muslim landowners. As a member of the PNO, Spaho spoke about the injustice made towards the Bosnian Muslims. In the PNO, Spaho also cooperated with the Croat representatives, and was supported by his party, the JMO, with that. Spaho was very active in the PMO and spoke out about the inequality when it comes to Bosnian Muslims.

In 1920, Spaho was involved in a political campaign before the election of the Constituent Assembly. The election was held on 28 November 1920, and Spaho entered the Assembly. This time, Spaho joined the opposition. Again he was very active, especially around the questions which involved the Bosnian Muslim equality and their representation within the Government. Most of the time, Spaho and the JMO were in the opposition in the Constituent Assembly, however, as the time passed, they eventually deferred to the Government. The Government of Nikola Pašić wanted to get the JMO on their side for the vote of the new Constitution. In order to gain their reliance, he promised them the territorial compactness of Bosnia and Herzegovina, instead of its regional self-government, which was advocated by the JMO.

Pašić's proposal was accepted by some members of the JMO. In the letter which was sent by the JMO to Pašić which included the requests for their support to the new constitution, the proposal about the territorial compactness was not even mentioned, but only improvements around the treatment of Bosnian Muslims. The JMO club in the Assembly was divided, one part supported the negotiations with the government, while other was against the negotiations. Eventually, Spaho became a member of the JMO's delegation to negotiate with the Government, along with Hamdija Karamehmedović and Osman Vilović. On 15 March 1921, they made an agreement with Pašić. In this agreement, Pašić promised to secure the Muslim religious autonomy, make certain changes with the lands of beys, secure the payment of damages to the Bosnian Muslim landowners of some 255 million Yugoslav dinars and to secure the territorial compactness of Bosnia and Herzegovina based on its territorial boundaries. The JMO club accepted the agreement and chose Spaho and Karamehmedović to be their ministers in the Government; Spaho would take certain economic ministry while Karamehmedović would take the Ministry of Health.

On 26 March 1921, Spaho entered the Pašić's Government as Minister of Trade and Industry. However, his second ministerial position did not lasted for long. The JMO representatives often clashed with the Radicals of Nikola Pašić, accusing them for trying to trick the JMO by not respecting the agreement they made. The speech made by the member of the Radical Party, Milan Srškić, in which he stated that Bosnian Muslim landowners should not get the payments for damage, but the social help, and that only the ones who were really poor, made the JMO leave the Government. Spaho and Karamehmedović resigned on 1 June 1921. Both of them accused the Pašić's Government of not respecting the agreement. However, the Government had a meeting the next day and decided that they would pay for the damage and that the JMO ministers should return to their posts, which they did the very next day. Eventually, the whole JMO club decided to support the new Constitution, while Spaho himself stated that he would only oppose the 135th Article of the Constitution, in which was stated that municipalities of the banovinas will be able to defect to other banovinas if a majority agreed to do so, as this could damage the territorial commpactnes of Bosnia and Herzegovina. Soon, the whole JMO was again divided into factions, one that supported the 135th Article, the other that opposed it; among those who opposed it was Džafer-beg Kulenović. Those who supported the 135th Article were marked as a pro-Serb faction, while those who opposed were marked as the pro-Croat faction, even though the party's official newspaper denied the existence of any faction. Because of the problem with the 135th Article, on 26 June 1921, Spaho made an irrevocable resignation, while Karamehmedović resigned four days later. The new Vidovdan Constitution was accepted on 28 June, while both, Spaho and Karamehmedović, nevertheless, remained on their ministerial posts. On 3 September, while Spaho was on his way to Ljubljana to open a fair, a communist activist tried to assassinate him by planting a 14 kilogram naval mine, as he thought Spaho would travel by sea; however, Spaho took the train and avoided the assassination. The perpetrator was arrested and admitted his guilt.

=== Leader of the Yugoslav Muslim Organization ===
After voting the Vidovdan Constitution, part of the JMO thought that the party should break up the relations with Nikola Pašić; this part, led by Spaho, left Ibrahim Maglajlić, the President of the JMO. On 8 October 1921, the party elected the new Central Committee, electing Maglajlić as an honorary president and Spaho as its president. Spaho's election was seen as the party's turn towards left and basing on the autonomist policy. The Radicals and the Democrats argued for the ministerial posts, while the JMO, in this struggle, tried to secure better position of Bosnian Muslims. In JMO itself, the turmoil escalated between the leftists, led by Spaho, and rightists, led by Maglajlić; it is also thought that this turmoil was caused by the Radical Party in order to weaken the political strength of the JMO.

== Death ==
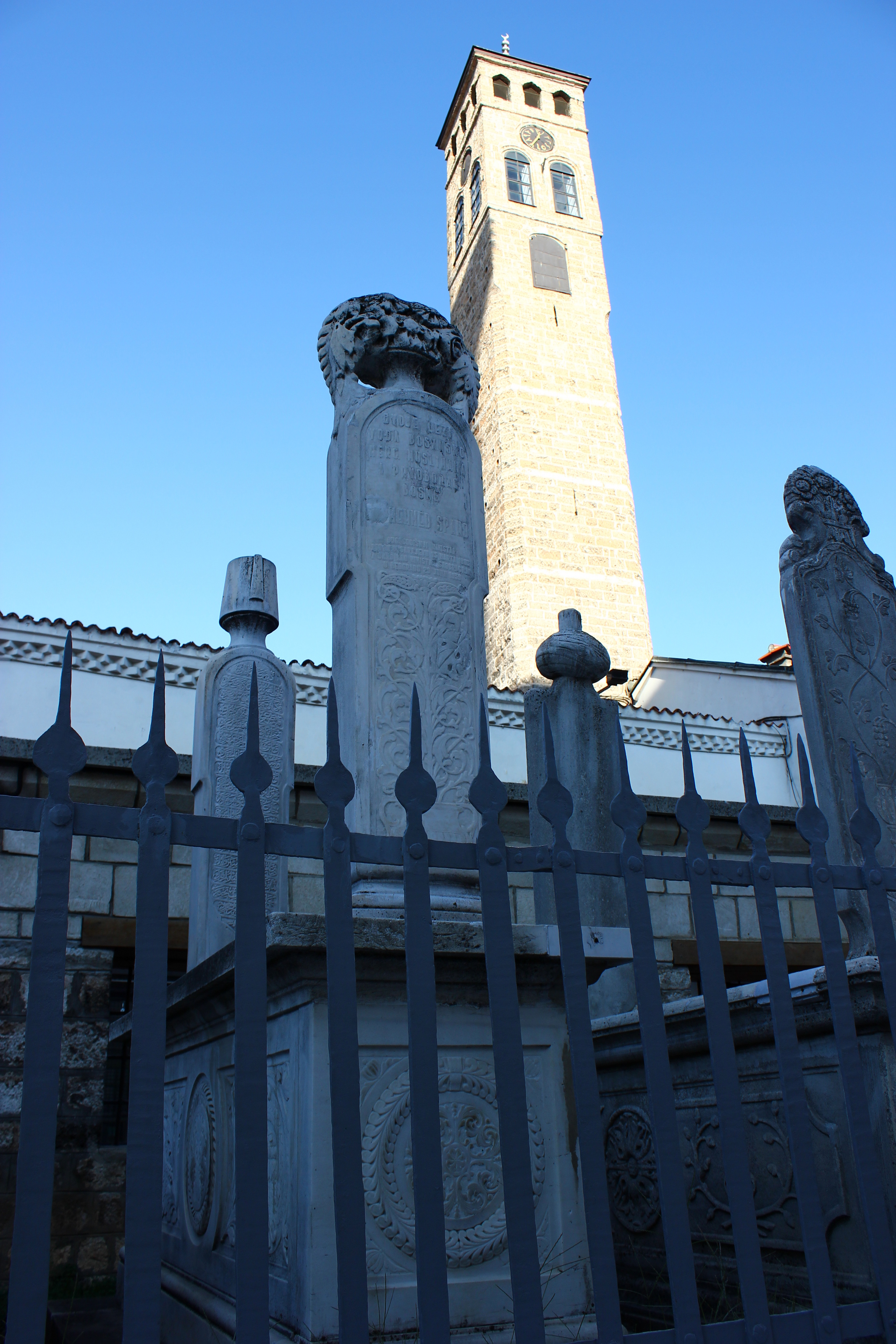
Gravestone in Sarajevo

On the evening of 28 June 1939, Spaho departed Sarajevo for Belgrade by train, after receiving an invite from Prince Paul of Yugoslavia. With him was his personal secretary Mehmed Hadžihasanović, son of prominent Sarajevo dealer and then-senator Uzeir-aga Hadžihasanović. They arrived early the next morning at a train station, greeted by Džafer Kulenović, among others. Spaho arrived by car to the "Srpski kralj" (The Serbian King) hotel, where he stayed when in Belgrade, and sat down at a desk to inspect some letters which had built up in his absence. Around that time, the hotel room received a phone call, an invite to take part in a "police celebration". Spaho declined to attend, saying he was overloaded with work. He took something to write and, at that moment suddenly grabbed his chest and fell off his chair. Hadžihasanović rushed over to his side, but it was too late, Spaho was deceased. His funeral on 30 June 1939 was attended by an estimated crowd of 30,000 mourners.

Several versions of his death have circulated since that morning in 1939. One says that, while preparing an outfit for Spaho, Hadžihasanović heard a shout coming from the bathroom, rushing over, only to find him dead by the faucet. Another claims that he fell onto a bed on his way to the bathroom, others state that he died in the bathroom. Spaho's daughter Emina specified in March 2013 that he was served poisoned coffee upon leaving the bathroom, dropping almost immediately after his first sip. On 5 July 1939, Mehmed Sulejmanpašić, a reporter for the Turkish newspaper Cumhuriyet published a story claiming that Spaho had been poisoned and that his death was not a natural one, arguing that the attitude of Belgrade police chief Dragi Jovanović, who "spent the entire time in the room with the Spaho's body, chasing out anyone who lingered for more than half a minute," was suspicious.

On the occasion of the 130th anniversary of his birth in 2013, his 91-year-old daughter Emina Kadić spoke to the newspaper Oslobođenje about her belief that her father had been poisoned when she was 17. She reiterated her theory in 2014, on the occasion of the 75th anniversary of her father's death, stating that Prince Paul was the one who ordered her father's assassination.

Kadić added that the Prince saw her father as a nuisance due to his fight for Muslim rights in the Kingdom of Yugoslavia, and for being against the Cvetković–Maček Agreement, believing it to be an attempt by Serbs and Croats to divide Bosnia, and having it become part of Serbia and Croatia, disappearing from existence. She claims her father's disapproval of the Cvetković–Maček Agreement and the division of Bosnia amongst the Serbs and Croats as the main motive behind the assassination on the Serb holiday Vidovdan. Kadić said that her brother Zijah went back to Belgrade years later and spoke to the waiter who served their father the coffee that morning. She said that the waiter, named Dragan Vujić, admitted that he personally poured the poison into the cup of coffee. She said "Why this was never investigated is another story." Kadić described her father as a kind man, who, although spending a lot of time working in Belgrade, would relax in his garden upon returning to Sarajevo.
