= Ivan Pernar (politician, born 1889) =

Croatian politician (1889–1967)

Personal details
- Born: 3 November 1889 Marija Gorica, Kingdom of Croatia-Slavonia, Austria-Hungary (now Marija Gorica, Croatia)
- Died: 2 April 1967 (aged 77) New York City, New York, United States
- Party: Croatian Peasant Party

Ivan Pernar (3 November 1889 – 2 April 1967) was a Croatian politician of the Croatian Peasant Party. He was a member of the National Assembly of the Kingdom of Serbs, Croats and Slovenes.

On 20 June 1928, Pernar was one of several Croatian Peasant Party representatives shot at by People's Radical Party representative Puniša Račić. While Pernar recovered from the gunshot, party leader Stjepan Radić died from the wounds suffered in the attack. During the subsequent January 6th Dictatorship, Pernar was jailed in Sremska Mitrovica for 3 years.

Pernar was later selected as a senator for the Banovina of Croatia. In 1945, he emigrated to the United States where he remained until his death in 1967.

The Croatian politician, Ivan Pernar (born 1985), is his grandnephew.
