= Bunjevac-Šokac Party =

Bunjevac-Šokac Party Буњевачко-шокачка странка Bunjevačko-šokačka stranka
- Leader: Blaško Rajić (1920–24); Josip Vuković-Đido (1924–26)
- Founded: 1920
- Dissolved: 1926
- Merged into: HSS
- Ideology: Conservatism; Agrarianism
- Political position: Center-right

Bunjevac-Šokac Party (Croatian: Bunjevačko-šokačka stranka) was a political party of Croats in the Kingdom of Serbs, Croats and Slovenes, part of province of Bačka (today Serbia).

The party was founded on 15 September 1920 in order to continue the organized political activity of Croats from Bačka (Bunjevci and Šokci), which had its tradition even before World War I. The party made good results on the parliamentary elections in 1920 and 1923. Its leader was Blaško Rajić.

After 28 November 1924 a crisis in the party arose because of disagreements among the membership about the visions of organized political life of Croats in Bačka in future. Part of membership was for "separated" way, while the other part was politically inclining towards Croatian Republican Peasant Party (HRSS) of Stjepan Radić. At that time, the leader of Party was Josip Vuković-Đido. After disagreements with the party leadership in 1924, Blaško Rajić abandoned the party.

The elections in 1925 proved that a majority of Croats from Bačka stood by the Bunjevac-Šokac Party. In the short time while these two parties coexisted, these parties spent that time in mutual accusations. Over the time BŠS more and more inclined towards Stjepan Radić and HSS. In 1926 almost all membership of this party joined the Croatian Peasant Party (HSS) of Stjepan Radić. Finally, Rajić himself turned to leader of Croats Stjepan Radić and became a resilient supporter of him and his party, HSS.

== Notable actions ==
On 19 September 1925 BŠS and Pučka kasina organized in Subotica the celebration and of establishment of Kingdom of Croatia. As a part of that celebration, a memorial plaque was unveiled. The memorial plaque was set in Subotica, on the King Tomislav Square. The inscription on the plaque was "The memorial plaque of millennium of Croatian Kingdom 925-1925. Set by Bunjevci Croats" ("Spomen-ploča tisućugodišnjice hrvatskog kraljevstva 925.-1925. godine. Postaviše bunjevački Hrvati").

== Sources ==
- Skenderović, Robert (4 January 2007). "Bunjevačko-šokačka stranka 1920. - 1926". Časopis za suvremenu povijest (in Croatian). 38 (3). ISSN 0590-9597.
