= Svetozar Pribićević =

Croatian Serb politician

Svetozar Pribićević Светозар Прибићевић
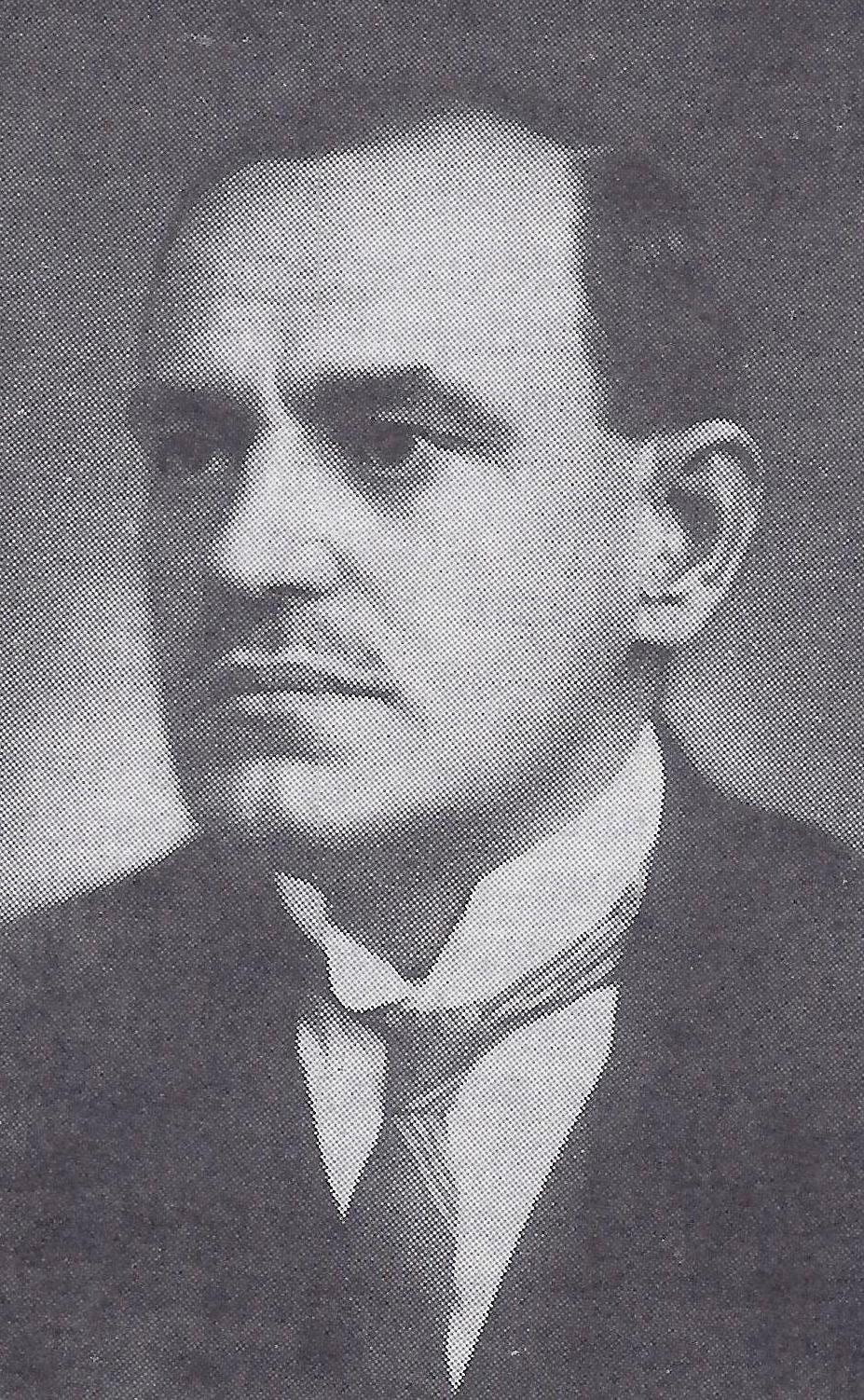
- Born: 26 October 1875; Hrvatska Kostajnica, Croatia-Slavonia, Austria-Hungary (now Hrvatska Kostajnica, Croatia)
- Died: 15 September 1936 (aged 60); Prague, First Czechoslovak Republic (now Prague, Czech Republic)
- Resting place: Olšany Cemetery, Prague
- Occupation: politician

Svetozar Pribićević (Serbian Cyrillic: Светозар Прибићевић, pronounced [sʋêtozaːr pribǐːt͡ɕeʋit͡ɕ]; 26 October 1875 – 15 September 1936) was a Croatian Serb politician in Austria-Hungary and later the Kingdom of Yugoslavia. He was one of the main proponents of Yugoslavism and a federalized South Slavic state which would later turn out to be Yugoslavia. However, he later became a bitter opponent of the same policy that was promoted by King Alexander I.

== Early life ==
Pribićević was born into an ethnic Serb family in Kostajnica (Castanowitz) in 1875, in the final years of the Croatian Military Frontier, a military-administered territory of Austria-Hungary on the border with Ottoman Bosnia with a sizeable ethnic Serb population which was integrated into the Austro-Hungarian Kingdom of Croatia-Slavonia in 1881.

In his youth he studied mathematics and physics at the University of Zagreb. In Zagreb he joined other young politically active groups of Croats and Serbs and produced the periodical Narodna misao ("National thought") in 1897 which argued that ethnic Croats and Serbs were one people, and that they should work together in Croatian politics.

He took over leadership of the Serb People's Independent Party (Srpska narodna samostalna stranka) in 1903. In 1905, he and his party sponsored the Zadar Resolution, by which the Independents proposed to work with willing Croatian political parties (and signatories of the Rijeka Resolution) for a new, more assertive Croatian policy known as the New Course Policy vis-à-vis the Hungarian and Austrian governments.

Between 1906 and 1918, he led the Croat-Serb Coalition, which was the political child of the two earlier resolutions. The Coalition dominated Croatian politics during that period. The power of the Coalition, and its Yugoslav state creation incentive, made it the target of attempts by Austrian and Hungarian authorities to destroy it. The treason trial of 1909 (in which a court in Zagreb tried 53 Serbs, including his brothers Valerijan and Adam, for treason) and the Friedjung trial (in which Pribićević and other members of the Coalition sued the Austrian historian Heinrich Friedjung for libel on the basis of several articles he wrote in the Reichspost) of the same year were the most obvious evidence of these campaigns.

Until 1910, Pribićević shared leadership of the Coalition with Frano Supilo. Supilo left the Coalition that year, and Pribićević led it alone from that point.

== Kingdom of Serbs, Croats, and Slovenes ==
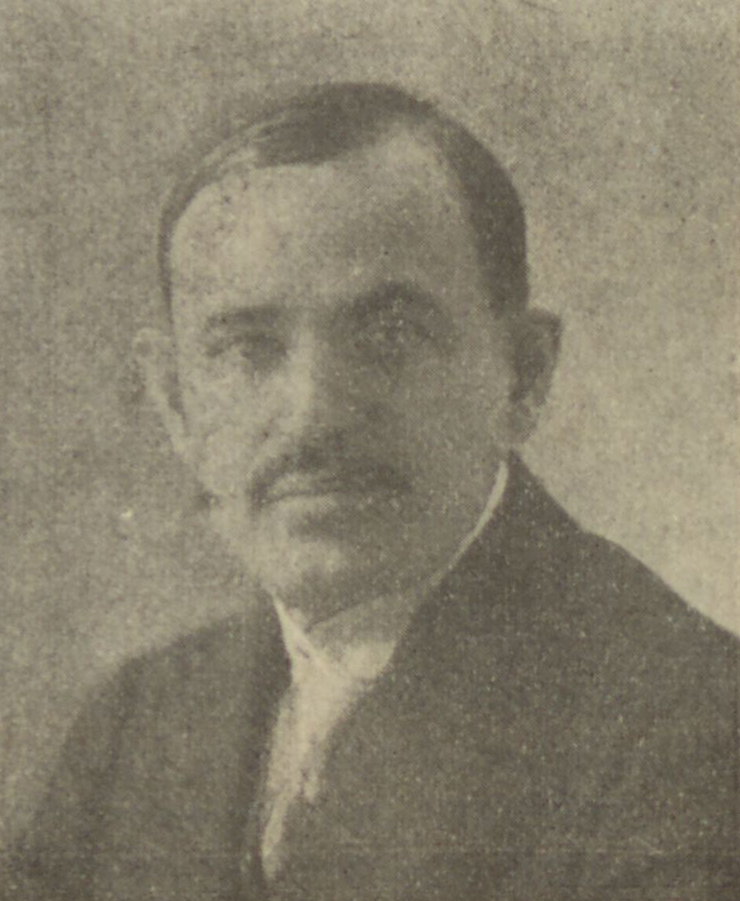
Svetozar Pribićević (pictured in 1914)

In 1918, he was leader of the Croato-Serbian Coalition which was then the dominant party in the Croatian Sabor. When the Croatian Sabor voted to join the State of Slovenes, Croats and Serbs, the state formed by the South Slav regions of the Austro-Hungarian Empire when that state collapsed as a result of its defeat in the First World War, Pribićević became one of the vice presidents of the new states ruling body, the National Council of Slovenes, Croats and Serbs. As Italy overran parts of the new state's territory in Istria and along the coast of Dalmatia he urged the council to seek unification with Serbia without delay. In this he received especially strong support from Dalmatian delegates and on the morning of the November 27 a delegation from the National Council set off for Belgrade which was to formally create a new state, the Kingdom of Serbs, Croats and Slovenes, a few days later.

Svetozar Pribićević then became the Minister of Internal Affairs. In this role, he implemented authoritarian policies, believing that a strict centralized system was necessary in order to preserve the union.

Pribićević's Croat-Serb coalition dissolved. Its members quickly fused with political groupings from other parts of the former Austria-Hungary. This began negotiations with the Pašić's radicals, but the negotiations quickly fell through. Instead, they joined with the Serbian opposition (including the party of Ljubomir Davidović) to form a bloc that was to dominate the Provisional Representation, which served as a Parliament until the election of the Constituent Assembly. This bloc itself formed into a party which in 1920 adopted the name the Democratic Party. Even though Ljubomir Davidović was the leader, Pribićević had as much, if not more, influence on the policy of the party. In the elections for the Constituent Assembly, the Democratic Party did significantly worse in the former Austria-Hungarian regions which weakened Pribićević's influence in the Party. However, in alliance with the Radicals, the Democratic party managed to ensure that the new constitution would have the centralized form that, at the time, Pribićević supported.

In January 1920, Pribićević had a secret meeting with Đuro Basariček of the Croatian Republican Peasant Party. Basariček told Pribićević that should there be held elections for the provisional representation not only would the Peasant Party participate in the elections but they would also join in the preparations for the Constituent Assembly. However, King Alexander refused to sign the decree. Though Pribićević remained on good terms with Alexander, it was at this point he lost his faith in Alexander's judgment.

In December 1921, the Radicals provoked a government crisis, demanding the portfolio of Minister of Internal Affairs. The Democratic Party refused this, but at a meeting of their deputies club they voted, by secret ballot, that Pribićević should step down as Minister of Internal Affairs. Pribićević became, instead, the Minister of Education.

The elections in this period were marred by police harassment of voters and confiscation of pamphlets and this kind of election rigging also impacted the Democratic Party's success. In addition, some opposition leaders such as Stjepan Radić were imprisoned on charges of treason, but this in turn had mobilized their own electoral base.

== Independent Democrats, prison, and exile ==
In 1924, Pribićević's faction made their break with the Democratic Party final by founding a new party, the Independent Democratic Party.

When Nikola Pašić and Stjepan Radić came to an agreement in 1925 which would temporarily pacify the Croatian Peasant Party, Pribićević switched to the opposition, and started thinking that his prior support for the Radicals had only helped fortify the Serbian domination. After the election of 1927, the Independent Democrats and Croatian Peasant Party both became the opposition, and then decided to form the Peasant-Democrat coalition (Serbo-Croatian: Seljačko-demokratska koalicija, SDK).

In the coalition with Radić, Pribićević converted from an advocate of centralism to its adversary, and in the spring of 1928, Pribićević and Radić waged a bitter parliamentary battle against the ratification of the Treaty of Nettuno with Italy, having actually secured a majority in the parliament, but not being able to lead the government. This in turn mobilized nationalist opposition in Serbia but provoked a violent reaction from the governing majority including death threats. In the summer of 1928, Radić was assassinated in Parliament, and the opposition started a boycott of the parliament, insisting on new elections.

In 1929, the January 6th Dictatorship was instituted by the King and Pribićević was interned by the authorities in Brus, Serbia for a period of two years, when finally in 1931, his health problems allowed him to be released and emigrate.

While in Paris, in 1933 he published the "King Alexander's Dictatorship" (French: La dictature du roi Alexandre), a book in which he criticized Alexander and blamed him for Yugoslavia's political turmoil since 1918. He advocated for a federal and republican structure for Yugoslavia. He also wrote a "Letter to the Serbs" the same year, in which he advocated an understanding between the Serbs and the Croats based on equality of the two nations, stating that "any other way and solution would mean eternal friction, mutual conflicts and wars, which would eventually end disastrously for both" (svaki drugi put i rješenje značilo bi vječite trzavice, međusobne sukobe i ratove, koji bi se na kraju katastrofalno završili za oboje). In May 1933, Pribićević held talks with Branimir Jelić and Stjepan Radić's eldest son Vlatko.

He died in exile in Prague in 1936.

== Sources ==
- Miller, Nicholas J. (1997). Between Nation and State: Serbian Politics in Croatia Before the First World War. Pittsburgh: University of Pittsburgh Press. ISBN 9780822977223.
- Nielsen, Christian Axboe (2014). Making Yugoslavs: Identity in King Aleksandar's Yugoslavia. University of Toronto Press. ISBN 978-1-44262-750-5.

Political offices
Preceded by Marko Trifković	Minister of Internal Affairs; 1918–1920	Succeeded by Marko Trifković
Preceded by Milorad Drašković	Minister of Internal Affairs; 1924	Succeeded by Vojislav Marinković
