= Yugoslav Muslim Organization =

Yugoslav Muslim Organization Jugoslavenska Muslimanska Organizacija, JMO
- Chairman: Mehmed Spaho; Džafer Kulenović
- Founder: Ibrahim Maglajlić; Mehmed Spaho
- Founded: 1919
- Dissolved: 1941
- Headquarters: Sarajevo
- Ideology: Bosniak nationalism National conservatism Islamism
- Political position: Right-wing
- Ethnic group: Bosniaks, other Slavic Muslims

The Yugoslav Muslim Organization (Serbo-Croatian: Jugoslavenska muslimanska organizacija / Југославенска муслиманска организација, JMO) was an Ethnic Muslim (today Bosniak) political party in the Kingdom of Serbs, Croats and Slovenes, later in the Kingdom of Yugoslavia. It was founded in Sarajevo on the 16 February 1919 and was led by Mehmed Spaho. The party was a successor of Muslimanska Narodna Organizacija (Muslim National Organization), a conservative Bosniak party founded in 1906, during the Austro-Hungarian era. The Muslim National Organization was itself a successor of the conservative Bosniak "Movement for waqf and educational autonomy" (Pokret za vakufsko-mearifsku autonomiju) that goes back to 1887. In election campaigns the JMO did mobilize on religious slogans rather than Bosniak nationality, calling failure of Muslims to vote for the party as a sin. The party had considerable influence in Islamic religious institutions, and JMO came to dominate the political life in Bosnia and Herzegovina. The party appealed to Muslims throughout Yugoslavia, urging them not to migrate to Turkey.

In 1921, JMO aligned itself with the governing Serbian parties. JMO wanted to achieve territorial integrity of Bosnia and Herzegovina and demanded religious autonomy as well as right for the Sharia law. Their demands were given to the Constitutional Assembly and as a compromise those demands were accepted and incorporated in the Vidovdan Constitution under the so-called "Turkish Paragraph". The support of JMO was important to pass the new constitution. This alliance became short-lived though. In 1922 a new Muslim party, Yugoslav Muslim People's Organization (JMNO), was formed and overtook the role as the Muslim ally of the Serbian parties. JMNO did however fail to attract any major section of the JMO vote-bank. In 1923, the party founded the cultural organization Narodna Uzdanica.

JMO entered into a short-lived alliance with the Slovenian People's Party and the Croatian Republican Peasant Party. After the alliance broke down in 1925, JMO found itself politically isolated and came under attack from Serbian paramilitaries. At one time the paramilitaries attempted to kill Spaho.

In 1927, the party suffered some setback in the election. After the election JMO joined a Serbian-led government. At this time the profile of JMO shifted, as it began to stress that it was a Bosnian party, rather than Muslim or Yugoslav.

JMO was banned by Alexander I, along with other parties. Mehmed Spaho later rebuilt the JMO and joined Milan Stojadinović’s Serbian-dominated government in 1937. He resigned in 1939 to protest the creation of the banovina of Croatia: he died a few months later and was succeeded as party chairman by Džafer Kulenović. The JMO dominated Bosnian politics until 1941. After the invasion of Yugoslavia by Axis powers, Ante Pavelić's quisling Croatian regime received support from several JMO leaders, among whom Džafer Kulenović who served as vice-president. Other JMO members supported the Partisans instead; one JMO senator participated to the first AVNOJ session in 1942.

== Election results ==
Elections results in Yugoslavia, 1920–1927

Year	%	Seats
1920	6.9	24
1923	5.2	18
1925	5.4	15
1927	2.5	18
