= Independent Democratic Party (Yugoslavia) =

Independent Democratic Party Самостална демократска странка Samostalna demokratska stranka
- Leader: Svetozar Pribićević; Srđan Budisavljević
- Founded: 1924
- Dissolved: 1946
- Split from: Democratic Party
- Headquarters: Belgrade
- Ideology: Liberalism; Social liberalism Decentralization

The Independent Democratic Party (Serbo-Croatian: Samostalna demokratska stranka, Самостална демократска странка; Slovene: Samostojna demokratska stranka, SDS) was a social liberal political party in the Kingdom of Serbs, Croats and Slovenes, and later the Kingdom of Yugoslavia. It was established by Svetozar Pribićević as a breakaway faction of the Democratic Party in 1924. It was formed by three different groups: by far the largest group were the Serbs from the areas of the former Austro-Hungarian Empire, that is Croatian, Bosnian and Vojvodina Serbs, with the prevalence of the first. The second most influential group were Slovene centralist liberals. The third group was composed by Croat liberals, mostly from Dalmatia and Zagreb.

In the first three years of its existence, the party supported a strong central Yugoslav government, fiercely opposing the federalism of the Croatian Peasant Party, the Croatian nationalism and the Croatian Party of Rights, ethnic Serbian hegemonism of the People's Radical Party, and Slovenian and Bosnian quests for territorial autonomy, supported respectively by the Slovene People's Party and the Yugoslav Muslim Organization. In 1927, however, they reached an agreement with Stjepan Radić's Croatian Peasant Party, forming the Peasant-Democratic Opposition, which demanded a decentralization of Yugoslavia. After the establishment of the royal dictatorship of King Alexander I of Yugoslavia in January 1929, the party was officially dissolved, but continued to function underground, while its president Svetozar Pribićević went into exile. Many of its members joined the officially sponsored Yugoslav Radical Peasants' Democracy (renamed to Yugoslav National Party in 1933), including the great majority of its Slovenian members.

After Pribićević's death in exile in 1936, the leader of the party became Srđan Budisavljević. After the reinstatement of political parties ahead of the 1935 election, the Independent Democratic Party was allowed to function legally again. It joined the United Opposition led by Vladko Maček.

In the mid-1920s, before the "anti-centralist turn" of the party in 1927, the Independent Democratic Party drew support from the militant Yugoslav nationalist organization ORJUNA.

== Electoral performances ==
- 1925: 4.8% (8 MPs)
- 1927: 8.6% (27 MPs)

(banned; from 1929 to 1935)

- 1935 and 1938; in alliance with HSS

== See also ==
- Serb Independent Party
- Independent Democratic Serb Party
