= Stjepan Radić =

Croatian politician (1871–1928)

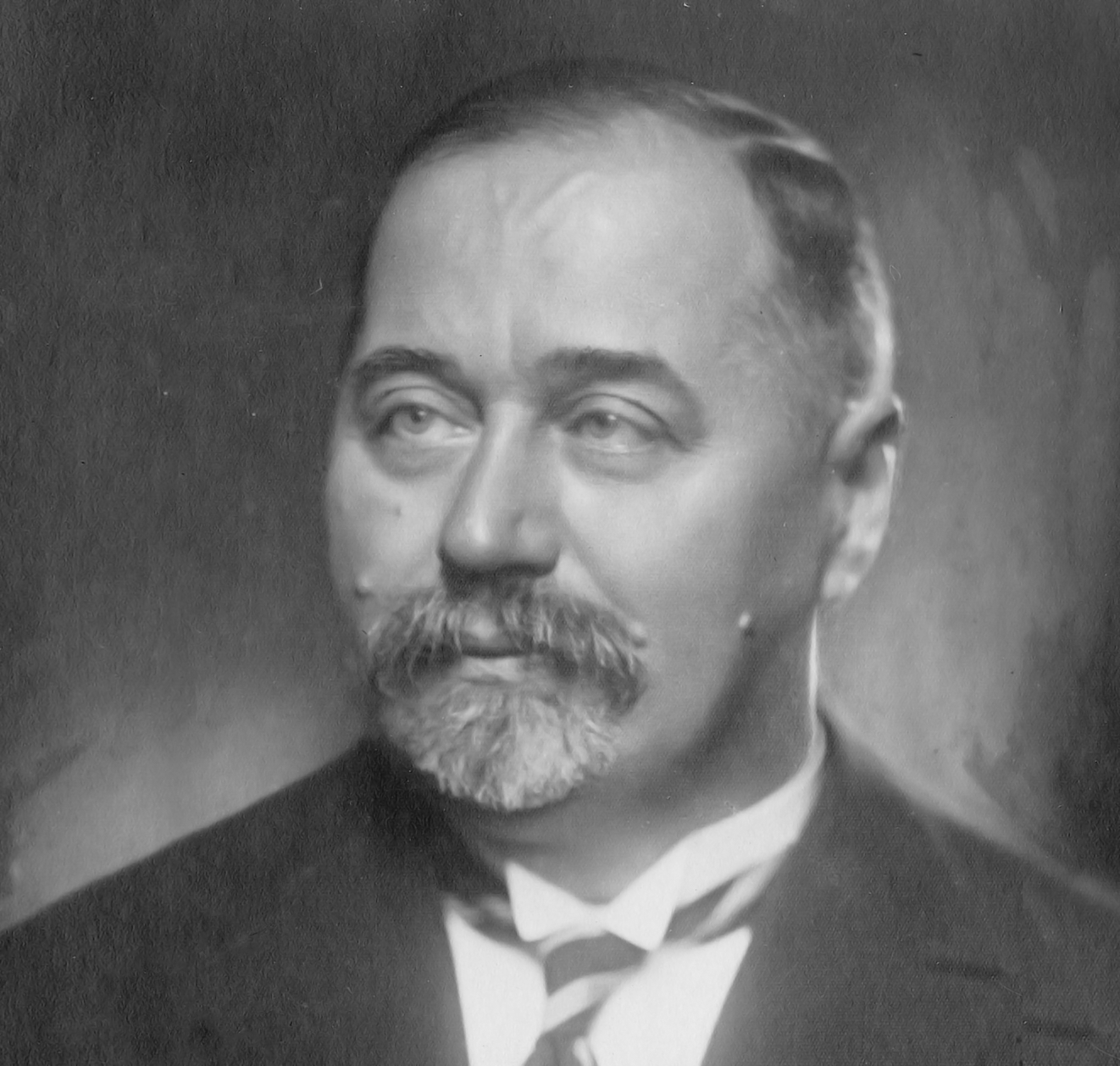
- Radić in the 1920s

President of the Croatian People's Peasant Party
- In office 28 December 1904 – 8 August 1928
- Preceded by: Office established
- Succeeded by: Vladko Maček

Leader of the Opposition
- In office February 1927 – 8 August 1928
- Prime Minister: Nikola Uzunović; Velimir Vukićević; Anton Korošec
- In office 1 January 1921 – November 1925
- Prime Minister: Nikola Pašić; Ljubomir Davidović; Nikola Pašić

Minister of Education
- In office November 1925 – February 1927
- Prime Minister: Nikola Pašić; Nikola Uzunović

Personal details
- Born: July 11, 1871 Desno Trebarjevo, Croatia-Slavonia, Austria-Hungary (modern Croatia)
- Died: 8 August 1928 (aged 57) Zagreb, Kingdom of Serbs, Croats and Slovenes (modern Croatia)
- Resting place: Mirogoj Cemetery, Zagreb, Croatia
- Citizenship: Hungarian-Croatian (1871–1918); Yugoslav (1918–1928)
- Party: Croatian Peasant Party
- Spouse: Marija Dvořák (m. 1898)
- Children: 4
- Relatives: Antun Radić (brother)
- Education: Sciences Po

Stjepan Radić (11 June 1871 – 8 August 1928) was a Croat politician and the co-founder of the Croatian People's Peasant Party (HPSS), active in Austria-Hungary and the Kingdom of Serbs, Croats and Slovenes.

He is credited with galvanizing Croatian peasantry into a viable political force. Throughout his career, Radić was opposed to the union and later Serb hegemony in Yugoslavia and became an important political figure in that country. He was shot in parliament by the Serbian People's Radical Party politician Puniša Račić. Radić died several weeks later from the serious stomach wound at the age of 57. This assassination further alienated the Croats and the Serbs and initiated the breakdown of the parliamentary system, culminating in the 6 January Dictatorship of 1929.

== Biography ==
=== Early life ===
Stjepan Radić was born in Desno Trebarjevo, Martinska Ves near Sisak in the Kingdom of Croatia-Slavonia within Austria-Hungary as the ninth of eleven children. After being expelled from his gymnasium in Zagreb, he finished at the Higher Real Gymnasium in Karlovac. In 1888, Radić travelled to Đakovo where he met with bishop Josip Juraj Strossmayer to request help for a trip to the Russian Empire. Strossmayer recommended Radić to Metropolitan Mihailo of Belgrade who referred him to a Russian teacher in Kiev. Radić travelled to Kiev and was allowed to stay at the city's Monastery of the Caves where he remained for six weeks before returning to Croatia.

In September 1891, he enrolled in law at the University of Zagreb. He was selected as a representative of the student body at the celebration of the 300th anniversary of the Battle of Sisak in 1893. After criticizing the Ban of Croatia Károly Khuen-Héderváry during the ceremony and referring to him as a "Magyar hussar", Radić was sentenced to four months in prison which he served in Petrinja. He was among a group of students who set fire to the Hungarian tricolour on 16 October 1895, during the visit of Emperor Franz Joseph to Zagreb. For this, Radić received a prison sentence and was expelled from the University of Zagreb, as well as barred from all universities in the Monarchy. After spending some time in Russia and, later, Prague where he briefly led the Progressive Youth, Radić continued his studies at the École libre des sciences politiques in Paris, where he graduated in 1899.

=== Lead up to the first Yugoslavia ===
After World War I he had opposed the merging of Croatia with the Kingdom of Serbia without guarantees of Croatian autonomy. Radić was selected as a member of the National Council of Slovenes, Croats and Serbs. On 24 November 1918 he famously urged delegates attending a session that would decide the country's political future not to "rush like geese into fog". He was the lone member of the National Council's central committee to vote against sending a delegation to Belgrade to negotiate with the Kingdom of Serbia. On 26 November, he was removed from the central committee.

After the Kingdom of Serbs, Croats and Slovenes was established, two representatives of Radić's party (by then named the Croatian Common-people Peasant Party) were appointed to the Provisional Representation which served as a parliament until elections for the Constituent could be held. Radić refused participation which he saw as legitimizing the unification.

=== Arrest ===
On 8 March 1919, the central committee passed a resolution penned by Radić that declared "Croatian citizens do not recognize the so called Kingdom of Serbs, Croats and Slovenes under the Karađorđević dynasty because this kingdom was proclaimed other than by the Croatian Sabor and without any mandate of the Croatian People." The full statement was included in a Memorandum which was translated into French and sent abroad to be addressed to the Paris Peace Conference. This act provoked a decision by the government to arrest Radić along with several other party members.

He was to be held some 11 months until February 1920, just before the first parliamentary elections of the Kingdom of SHS to a Constitutional Assembly which were held on 28 November when he was amnestied. The result of the November election was 230,590 votes, which equaled to 50 seats in the parliament out of 419. On 8 December, before the first sitting of parliament, Radić held a massive rally in front of 100,000 people in Zagreb. Stjepan Radić and the CCPP held a meeting in which a motion was put forward and voted on that the party will not be part of parliamentary discussions before matters are first resolved with Serbia on the matters of governance, the most sticking issues being the minorisation of the Croatian people and the overt powers of the King with the central government in Belgrade. The party was subsequently renamed to the Croatian Republican Peasant Party, highlighting the party's official stance. In December, ban of Croatia Matko Laginja was dismissed by the cabinet of Milenko Radomar Vesnić for allowing the rally to take place.

=== The new Constitution ===
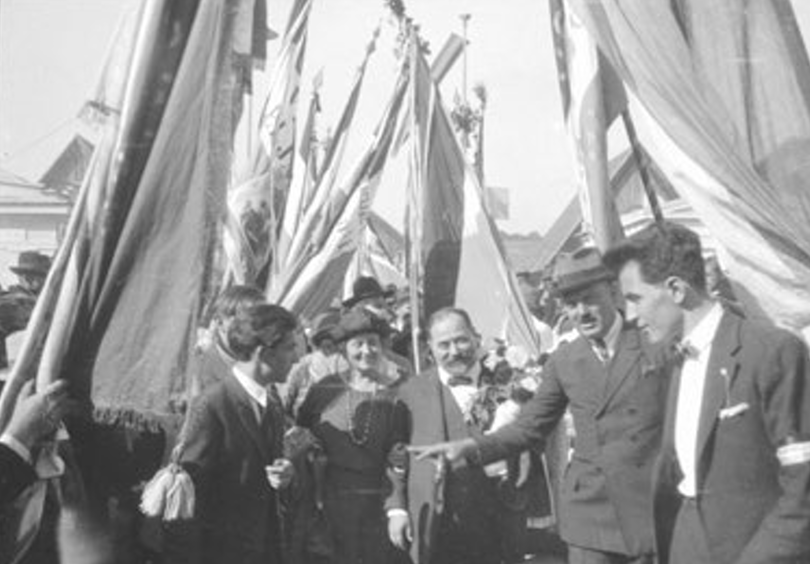
Radić at the party assembly in Zagreb, 1924

On 12 December 1920, the Parliament of SHS had their first sitting, without the representatives of CPP (50 representatives) and the Croatian Party of Rights (2 representatives). A total of 342 representatives presented their credentials out of a total of 419. On 28 June 1921, the Constitution of the Kingdom of Serbs, Croats and Slovenes was made law after a vote of 223 representatives out of the present 285, the total number of representatives in the parliament being 419; 35 voted against and 161 abstained or had walked out. The constitution was commonly known as the Vidovdan (St. Vitus Day) Constitution after the anniversary of the Serbian Battle of Kosovo, also the anniversary of the assassination of Archduke Franz Ferdinand in 1914.

In the next parliamentary elections, which were held in March 1923, the stance of Stjepan Radić and the CPP against the central government managed to turn into extra votes. The results of the election were, 70 seats or 473.733 votes, which represented the majority of the Croatian vote in Northern and Southern parts of Croatia, as well as the Croatian votes in Bosnia, as well as Herzegovina.

=== Second imprisonment ===
Radić still held on to the idea of an independent Croatia, and kept the party out of parliament in protest. This in effect afforded Serbian prime minister Nikola Pašić the opportunity to consolidate power and strengthen his Serb-dominated government. Radić embarked on an unsanctioned overseas trip in 1923 in which he visited England, France, Austria, and the Soviet Union. During this trip he briefly stayed at the home of the writer Richard Hughes, who had been Radić's spokesperson during Hughes's trip to Zagreb in 1922. On 1 July 1924, he proclaimed that his party would join the Krestintern as long as it was without Yugoslav representation and the Communist International denounced Yugoslav Unitarianism. The party congress approved his party's ascension into the Krestintern on 24 August and thereafter, the centralists and monarchists accused him of communism and anti-state activities. On 23 December, the central government declared that the political party CRPP was in contravention of the Internal security law of 1921 in the infamous Obznana declaration, and this was confirmed by King Alexander on 1 January 1924. Stjepan Radić was arrested on 5 January, along with several prominent members of his party.

After the parliamentary elections in February 1925, the CRPP even with its whole executive team behind bars, and with only Stjepan Radić at its helm, CRPP managed to win 67 parliamentary seats with a total of 532,872 votes. Even though the vote count was higher than at the previous election, the gerrymandering by the central government ensured that CRPP received fewer parliamentary seats. In order to increase his negotiating power the CRPP entered into a coalition with the Independent Democratic party (Samostalna demokratska stranka), Slovenian People's Party (Slovenska ljudska stranka) and the Yugoslav Muslim Organization (Jugoslavenska muslimanska organizacija).

=== Return to Parliament ===
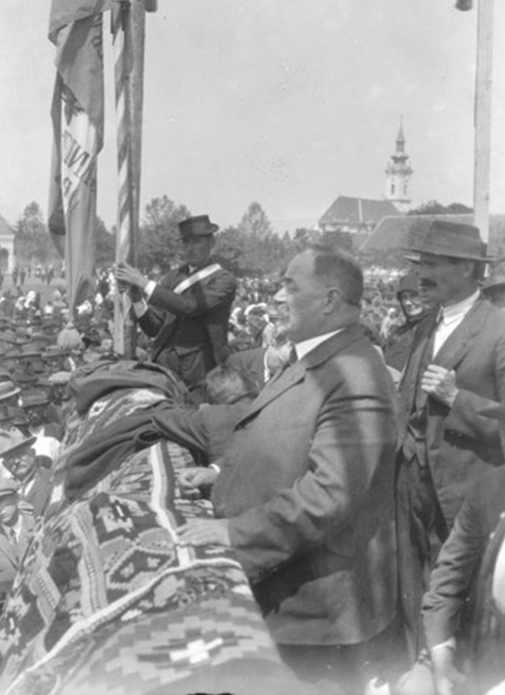
Radić speaking at a rally in Nova Gradiška in 1926

Immediately after the parliamentary elections in March 1925, the CRPP changed the party name to Croatian Peasant Party (Hrvatska seljačka stranka). With the backing of the coalition partners, the CPP made an agreement with the major conservative Serbian party - the People's Radical Party (Narodna radikalna stranka), in which a power-sharing arrangement was struck, as well as a deal to release the CPP executive from jail. The CPP recognized the central government and the rule of the monarch, as well as the Vidovdan constitution in front of the full parliament on 27 March 1925. Stjepan Radić was made the Minister for Education, whereas other CPP party members obtained ministerial posts: Pavle Radić, Nikola Nikić, Benjamin Šuperina, and Ivan Krajač. This powersharing arrangement was cut short after the death of the president of the Peoples Radical Party, Nikola Pašić, on 10 December 1926.

Radić soon resigned his ministerial post in 1926 and returned to the opposition, and in 1927 entered into a coalition with Svetozar Pribićević, president of the Independent Democratic Party, a leading party of the Serbs in Croatia. The Peasant-Democrat coalition had a real chance to end the Radicals' long-time stranglehold control of the Parliament. Previously they had long been opponents, but the Democrats became disillusioned with the Belgrade bureaucracy and restored good relations with the Peasant Party with which they were allies in the time of the Austro-Hungarian Empire. With this arrangement, Stjepan Radić managed to obtain a parliamentary majority in 1928. However, he was not able to form a government. The Peasant-Democrat coalition was opposed by some of the Croatian elite, like Ivo Andrić, who even regarded the followers of the CPP as "...fools following a blind dog..." (the blind dog being Stjepan Radić). As he reached his mid to late 50s, Radić was nearly blind.

=== Assassination in Parliament ===
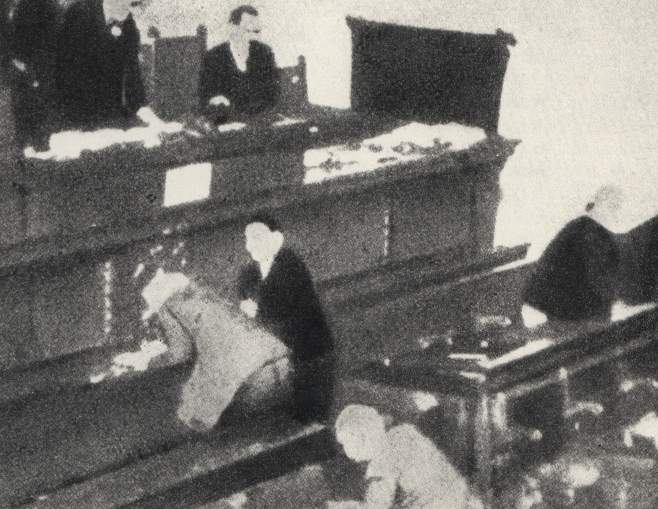
Radić's assassination in the National Assembly in Belgrade, 20 June 1928

Death threats and threats of violent beatings were made against Stjepan Radić in parliament, without any intervention by the president of the Assembly (Parliamentary speaker). On the morning of 20 June 1928, Radić was warned of the danger of an assassination attempt against him and was begged to stay away from the Assembly for that day. He replied that he was like a soldier in war, in the trenches and as such it was his duty to go but he nevertheless promised not to utter a single word.

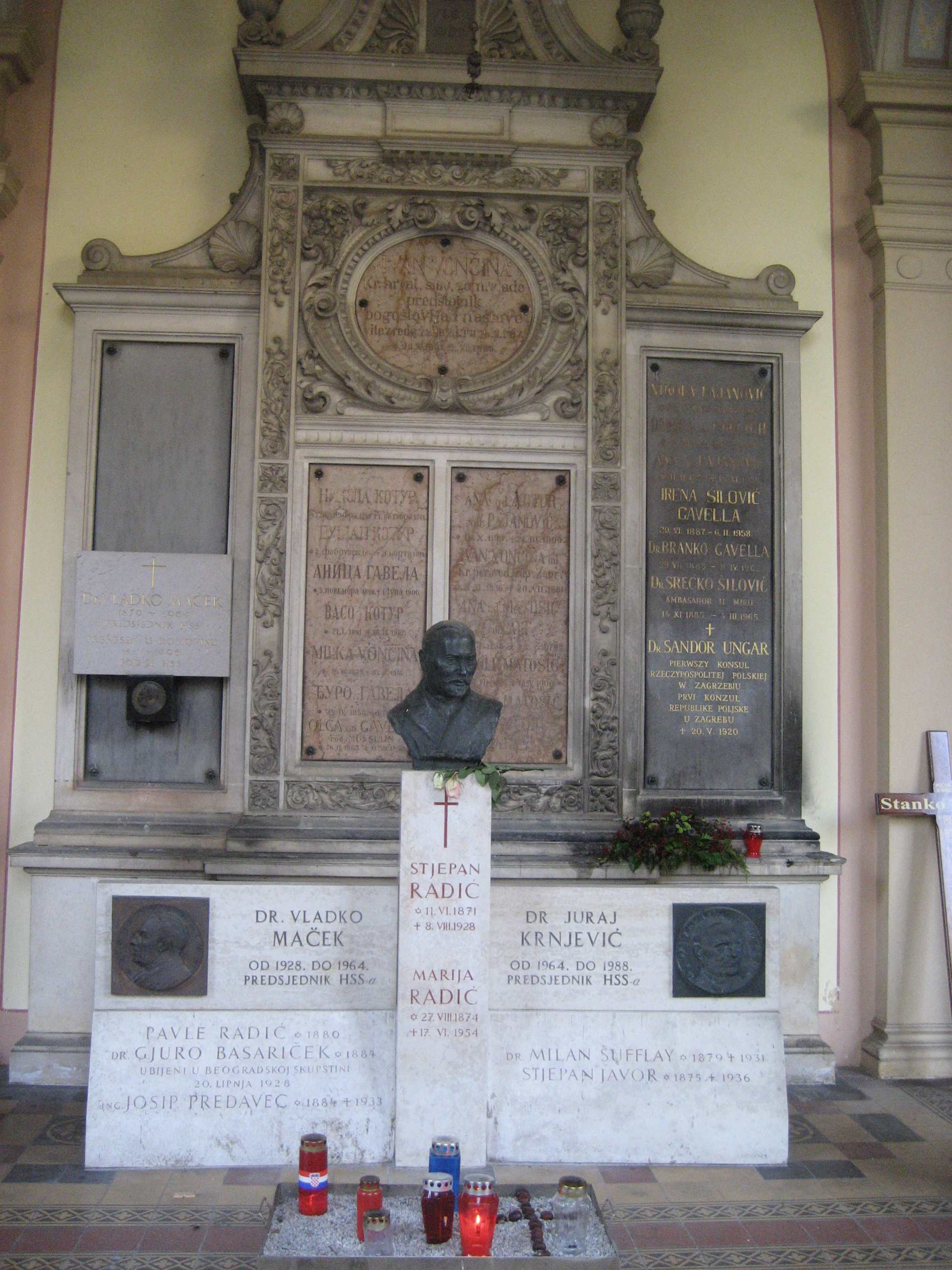
Stjepan Radić's grave in Mirogoj Cemetery

In the Assembly, Puniša Račić, a member of People's Radical Party from Montenegro, got up and made a provocative speech which produced a stormy reaction from the opposition but Radić himself stayed completely silent. Finally, Ivan Pernar shouted in response, "thou plundered beys" (referring to accusations of corruption related to him). In an earlier speech Radić accused Račić of stealing from civilian population and later refused to apologize when Račić asked him to. Puniša Račić made his way to the speaker podium facing the Croats. He put his hand in his pocket, where he held the pistol, and faced the president Ninko Perić and told him: "I ask of you, Mr. President, to sanction Pernar. If you fail to stop me, I shall punish him myself!" After that threat shouting started in the room. But Račić continued his threats: "Whoever tries to stand between me and Pernar will be killed!" At that moment Puniša Račić took out his Luger pistol. Minister Vujičić, sitting at the bench behind Račić, grabbed his hand in order to stop him. At the same time, minister Kujundžić came to his aid, but Račić, however, being very strong, broke himself free. At exactly 11:25 AM shots were fired - Pernar was hit 1 cm above the heart. When he collapsed, Račić took aim at Stjepan Radić. Đuro Basariček noticed this and leaped to help him. Račić, however, turned his way and shot him, bullet entering his loins and exiting around his scapula. Basariček fainted immediately. Ivan Granđa ran in front of Stjepan Radić and Račić shot him in the arm. As soon as he was down, Račić aimed at Stjepan Radić, and shot him in the chest. At that point Pavle Radić jumped towards Račić, who didn't get confused, but remarked: "Ha! I've been looking for you!" and shot him 1 cm below the heart. It was believed Račić would shoot Svetozar Pribičević, sitting next to Stjepan Radić, but Račić instead left the room through the ministers' chambers. The whole assassination was over in less than a minute. It was one of the first assassinations in a government building in history. Radić was left for dead and indeed had such a serious stomach wound (he was also a diabetic) that he died several weeks later at the age of 57. His funeral was officiated by archbishop Antun Bauer of Zagreb. There was a massive turnout for his burial, and his death was seen as causing a permanent rift in Croat–Serb relations in the old Yugoslavia.

Puniša Račić was convicted of the murders and sentenced to 60 years in prison, which was immediately reduced to 20 years. Račić spent most of his sentence under house arrest in a comfortable villa, where he was attended by three servants and was free to enter and leave at will. The leniency of his sentence likely came as a result of his connection with the Chetniks. He was released from house arrest on 27 March 1941. Račić was shot by the Yugoslav Partisans on 16 October 1944 during the liberation of Belgrade from the Axis powers.

Following the political crisis triggered by the shooting, in January 1929, King Aleksandar Karađorđević abolished the constitution, dissolved the parliament, banned all ethnic, regional and religious political parties, and declared a royal dictatorship.

Radić is buried in the Mirogoj Cemetery in Zagreb.

== Legacy ==
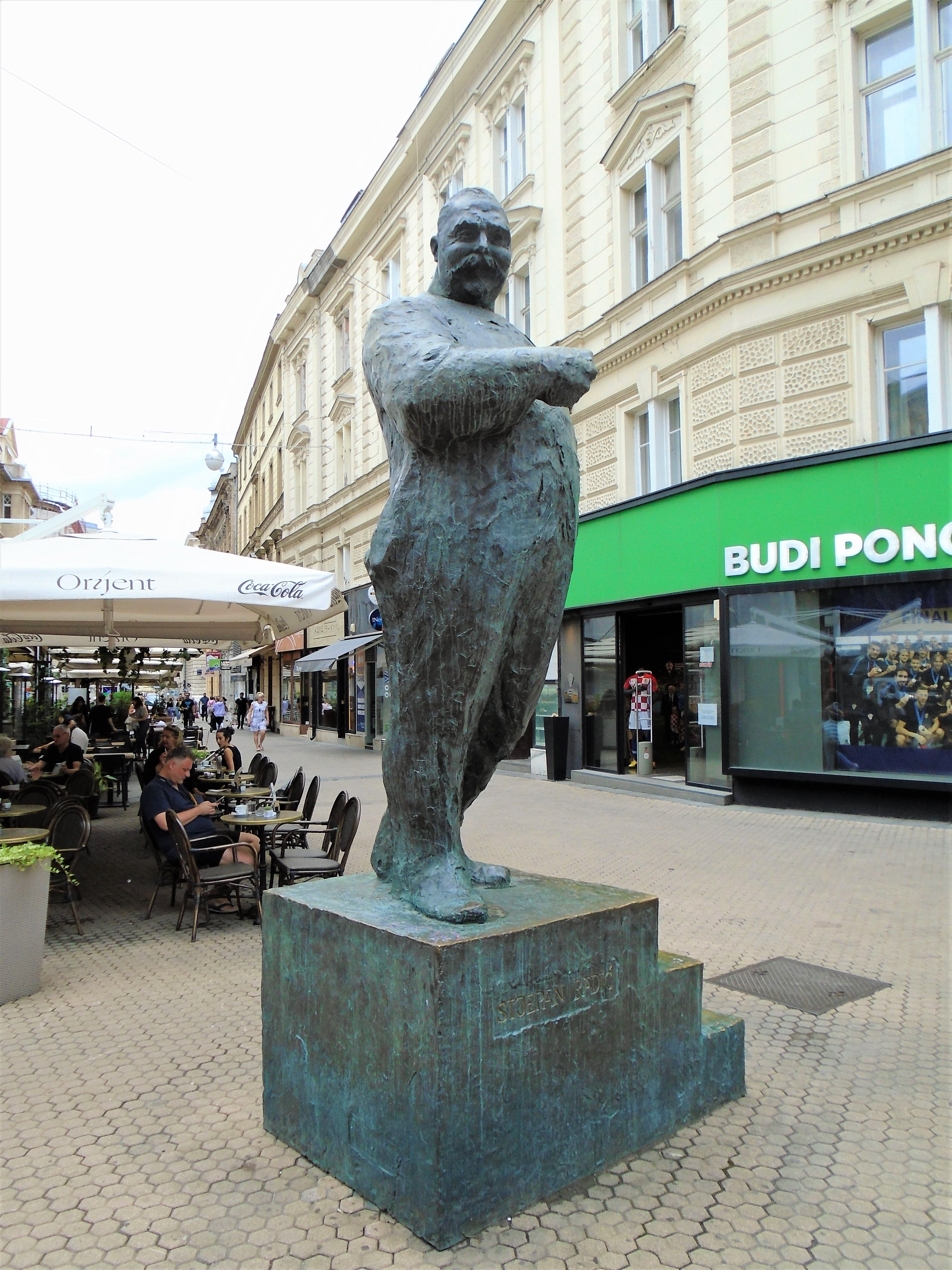
Monument to Radić in Zagreb

Stjepan Radić bust in Prelog

Radić's violent death turned him into a martyr and an icon of political struggle for the peasantry and the working class, as well as an icon of Croatian patriots. The iconography of Stjepan Radić was later used not only by his successor Vladko Maček, but also by other political options in Croatia: right wing or left wing.

The Ustaše used the death of Stjepan Radić as proof of Serbian hegemony, and as an excuse for their treatment of Serbs. However, a number of leading CPP figures who became political opponents of the Ustashe were imprisoned or killed by the regime. The Partisans on the other hand used this as a recruiting point with CPP members who were disillusioned with the Independent State of Croatia, and the latter had one brigade named after Antun and Stjepan Radić in 1943.

The image of Stjepan Radić was used extensively during the Croatian Spring movement in the early 1970s. There are many folk groups, clubs, primary and secondary schools which bear the name of Stjepan Radić. Many Croatian cities have streets and squares in his name. In 2008, a total of 265 streets in Croatia were named after him, making Radić the third most common person eponym of streets in the country. Statues of Stjepan Radić are also common. His portrait was depicted on the obverse of the Croatian 200 kuna banknote, issued in 1993 and 2002. Since 1995 the Republic of Croatia has awarded the Order of Stjepan Radić. In 2015 the Croatian Parliament declared 20 June to be the Memorial Day for Stjepan Radić and the June Victims.

In 1997, a poll in Croatian weekly Nacional named Stjepan Radić as the most admired Croatian historic personality.

A prominent street in central Sarajevo bears Radić's name.

=== Anti-clericalism ===
Stjepan Radić was a Roman Catholic, but at the same time extremely anti-clerical. In a 1924 rally in Krašić, birthplace of the late Cardinal Aloysius Stepinac, he stated: "Priests or bishops are teachers of the faith and as such we are listening to them in church, and even outside the church. But when they mistake religion with politics, with such gentile politics of revenge, blood, arrogance and gluttony, they are not teachers, but destroyers of faith and church. (...) When our bishops write a political letter, and when they want to be political leaders to the Croatian people, then it is my and our duty to decipher it and if necessary, condemn it." In an interview for Nova revija in 1926 he stated that "clericalism means abuse of the most sacred feelings of religion in order to destroy the family, to demolish people in order to gain political power." He would often repeat the slogan: Believe in God, but not in the priest. He supported the establishment of the Indigenous Croatian Catholic Church, and its separation from the Vatican. The secularist association "Voice of Reason – The Movement for a Secular Croatia" uses his portrait as its logo.

Assembly seats
Preceded by	Member of Croatian Parliament for Ludbreg; 1908–1918	Succeeded by Parliament abandoned
Party political offices
Preceded by Post established	President of the Croatian People's Peasant Party; 1904–1928	Succeeded by Vladko Maček
