= Agrarian Party (Yugoslavia) =

Agrarian Party Земљорадничка странка Zemljoradnička stranka
- Leader: Mihailo Avramović (1919–23); Jovan Jovanović Pižon (1923–39); Branko Čubrilović (1939–41)
- Founded: 12 October 1919
- Dissolved: 1945
- Ideology: Agrarianism; Parliamentarism
- Political position: Center-right

The Agrarian Party (Serbo-Croatian: Земљорадничка странка, Zemljoradnička stranka) was an agrarian political party within the Kingdom of Serbs, Croats and Slovenes and later the Kingdom of Yugoslavia.

The party was founded in 1919, as the Alliance of Agrarians. It initially operated throughout the state, before merging in Croatian majority areas with the Croatian Peasant Party. A splinter party called the National Peasant Party of Dragoljub Jovanović later emerged. The Agrarians officially dissolved in 1945 after the proclamation of the Socialist Federal Republic of Yugoslavia.
