= Democratic Party (Yugoslavia) =

Democratic Party Демократска странка Demokratska stranka
- Chairman: Milan Grol (last)
- Founder: Ljubomir Davidović
- Founded: 15 February 1919
- Banned: 1946
- Merger of: Serbian Progressive Party; People's Party; National Progressive Party; Croat-Serb Coalition
- Succeeded by: Democratic Party (Serbia) (1990, self-proclaimed)
- Headquarters: Belgrade
- Ideology: Liberalism; Yugoslavism; Protectionism
- Political position: Centre

The Yugoslav Democratic Party, the State Party of Serbian, Croatian and Slovene Democrats, and the Democratic Party, also known as the Democratic Union were the names of liberal political parties that existed in a series in succession in the State of Slovenes, Croats and Serbs and the Kingdom of Serbs, Croats and Slovenes (later the Kingdom of Yugoslavia).

== History ==
=== Yugoslav Democratic Party ===
The Yugoslav Democratic Party (Slovene: Jugoslovenska demokratska stranka) was a Slovenian liberal political party, founded in June 1918 from the merge of all three Slovene national liberal parties that had been formed since the 1890s in the Slovene-speaking parts of Austria-Hungary: the National Progressive Party in Carniola, the National Party in Styria, and the National Progressive Party in Gorizia and Gradisca. Prominent members included Ivan Tavčar, Ivan Hribar, Albert Kramar, Gregor Žerjav, and Milko Brezigar.

=== State Party of Serbian, Croatian and Slovene Democrats ===
In the Spring of 1919, in Sarajevo, the State Party of Serbian, Croatian and Slovene Democrats (Serbian: Државотворна странка демократа Срба, Хрвата и Словенаца, Državnotvorna stranka demokrata Srba, Hrvata i Slovenaca) is created by a merger of the Yugoslav Democratic Party with Serbian and Croatian liberal parties, namely the Independent Radical Party led by Ljubomir Davidović, the fractions of Serbian Progressive Party, the People's Party of Croatia and the Svetozar Pribićević's Croat-Serb Coalition, as well as fractions of Montenegrin People's Party led by Andrija Radović.

The elected president of the party was Ljubomir Davidović, also a president of the Assembly and a mayor of Belgrade.

The party won the largest number of deputies in the first elections held in 1920: they could occupy 92 of the 419 seats in the constituent assembly. From 1 January 1922 on, they participated in the government of Prime Minister Nikola Pašić of the People's Radical Party. Together with the People's Radical Party, the Democrats were the main supporters of the constitution passed on 28 June 1921. Members of the Democratic Party were significantly involved in the foundation of the Organization of Yugoslav Nationalists (ORJUNA) in 1921. In the 1923 elections, the party's number of deputies in the National Assembly dropped to 51. In May 1924, the Democrats joined the Oppositional Bloc against the Pašić government, appealing for a democratic Yugoslavia and calling for a fair share in the government for Croatians and Slovenes.

=== Democratic Party ===
In early 1924, Prime Minister Pašić succeeded in winning the support of some Democratic deputies around Svetozar Pribićević, to reject especially the Croatian demands for more influence. Therefore, the conflict between Pribićević and party leader Ljubomir Davidović heated. While Pribićević intransigently persisted on the principle of the unitary Yugoslavia, Davidović favoured moderation and concessions considering the Croatian demands. Hence, Pribićević and fourteen fellow lawmakers left the Democratic Party and founded the Independent Democratic Party, which readily joined a "National Bloc" coalition with the Radical Party of Prime Minister Pašić.

The Slovenian, Croatian, Croatian Serb and Bosnian sections, led by Svetozar Pribićević, moved to the latter. The Democratic Party thus shrunk mostly to Serbia, Macedonia, and Montenegro, while in the former Austro-Hungarian areas of the state, the Independent Democratic Party prevailed.

The Democratic Party was in and out of government, either independently or as part of a coalition, until 1929 when King Alexander abolished the Vidovdan Constitution and created a personal dictatorship, changing the name of the country to Kingdom of Yugoslavia. The Democratic Party remained in opposition until World War II.

After Davidović's death in 1940, Milan Grol took over the presidency of the party.

During the invasion of Yugoslavia by Nazi Germany in 1941, Grol and most of the party leadership fled to the United Kingdom. After the war, the Democratic Party called for a boycott of communist-organized elections in 1945. The Communist Party (KPJ) led by Josip Broz Tito banned the Democratic Party in 1946.

== Electoral performances ==
Year	Leader	Popular vote	% of popular vote	Position	# of seats	Seat change	Position	Coalition
1920	Ljubomir Davidović	319,448	19.9%	▲1st	92 / 419	▲92	▲1st	–
1923	Ljubomir Davidović	400,342	18.4%	▼3rd	51 / 312	▼41	▼3rd	–
1925	Ljubomir Davidović	279,686	11.8%	3rd	36 / 315	▼15	3rd	–
1927	Ljubomir Davidović	381,784	16.4%	▲2nd	59 / 315	▲23	▲2nd	–
1931	Ljubomir Davidović	Banned			0 / 370	▼59	—N/a	–
1935	Ljubomir Davidović	1,076,345	37.4%	2nd	67 / 370	▲67	▲2nd	United Opposition
1938	Ljubomir Davidović	1,364,524	44.9%	2nd	67 / 370	0	2nd	United Opposition
1945	Milan Grol	Election boycott			0 / 354	▼67	—N/a	-

== See also ==
- Democratic Party (Serbia)
