= Vidovdan Constitution =

Fundamental law of the Kingdom of Yugoslavia from 1921 to 1929

The Vidovdan Constitution was the first constitution of the Kingdom of Serbs, Croats and Slovenes. It was approved by the Constitutional Assembly on 28 June 1921 despite the opposition boycotting the vote. The Constitution is named after the feast of St. Vitus (Vidovdan), a Serbian Orthodox holiday. The Constitution required a simple majority to pass. Out of 419 representatives, 223 voted for, 35 voted against and 161 abstained.

The Constitution was in effect until King Alexander proclaimed his 6 January Dictatorship on that date in 1929.

== Background ==
The Constitutional Assembly was formed after the November 1920 Kingdom of Serbs, Croats and Slovenes Constitutional Assembly election.

== Adoption ==
The process of adopting the Vidovdan Constitution revealed major political conflicts in the new state. Although there were earlier plans to adopt a Constitution (see the Guidelines, the Corfu Declaration, the Geneva Declaration), the Constitution was eventually adopted by a narrow majority and overriding on a national basis.

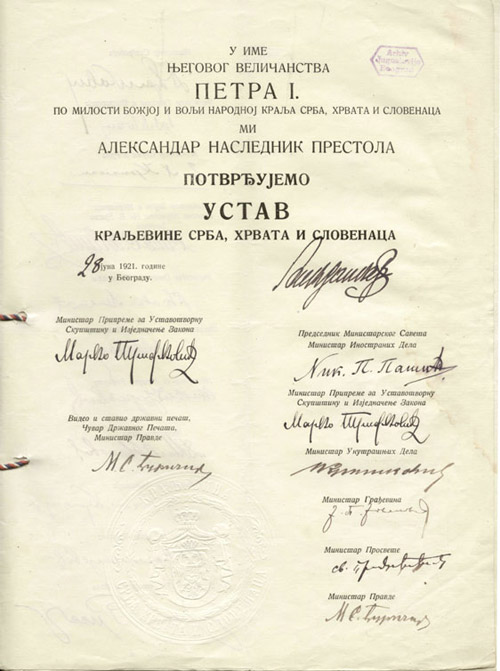
Last page of the original copy of the Constitution

=== For ===
- Democratic Party
- People's Radical Party
- Yugoslav Muslim Organization
- Alliance of Agrarians
- Džemijet

=== Against ===
- Yugoslav Social-Democratic Party
- Yugoslav Republican Party
- Foreign Minister Ante Trumbić

=== Boycotted ===
- Communist Party of Yugoslavia – left assembly in June
- Croatian Republican Peasant Party – boycotted assembly since 1920 elections
- Slovenian People's Party – left assembly in June
- Croatian People's Party – left assembly in June
- Croatian Union – left assembly in May

== Provisions ==
The SCS Kingdom is designated as a constitutional, parliamentary and hereditary monarchy, whose language is Serbo-Croatian-Slovenian. A unitary system was established (the theory of the tribe people). The proclaimed principles of separation of powers were deformed by later provisions, but in principle parliamentarianism existed.

Legislative power was shared by the King and the National Assembly. The king had a wide range of powers - legislative initiative, sanction, promulgation of laws as well as initiative and consent to change the Constitution. He also had the right to declare war and conclude peace. He also possessed extensive powers regarding the appointment of judges and the dissolution of the assembly. In addition, he had the classic powers of the head of state.

The National Assembly was a unicameral representative body. According to the Vidovdan Constitution, citizens had political rights - voting rights, association rights, assembly and collusion. Voting rights were limited by the relatively high age bracket and were not enjoyed by women. For women, the Constitution provided for the passage of legislation that would address the issue of their suffrage, but it was not enacted throughout the life of the kingdom. Each member of the assembly had the right of legislative initiative, parliamentary question, interpellation. In the event of a change of Constitution, the Assembly dissolved and elected a new one, which had the meaning of a hidden constitutional referendum.

The Council of Ministers was accountable to both the King and the National Assembly (Orleans parliamentarism) and the ministers did not have to be MPs. There was also the criminal and civil liability of the ministers, with a special State Court. The Council of Ministers had the right to legislate, to issue regulations for the implementation of the law and those with legal force in special cases.

The courts were independent and organized as first instance, appellate and cassation courts (based in Zagreb). Special administrative courts (State Council and Main Control) were also envisaged.

A large number of socio-economic rights were prescribed, as well as a special Economic Council.

The units of territorial-administrative division were districts, districts, districts and municipalities.

== Alternative proposals ==
=== Croatian Republican Peasant Party ===
The Croatian Republican Peasant Party adopted its Constitution of the neutral peasant republic of Croatia in Zagreb on 1 April 1921.

=== Croatian Union ===
The Croatian Union had proposed a confederation of the kingdom into six entities:

1. Serbia
2. Croatia
3. Montenegro
4. Bosnia and Herzegovina
5. Vojvodina
6. Slovenia

== Aftermath ==
On 30 June, an editorial in the People's Radical Party's journal Samouprava stated, "This year's Vidovdan restored an empire to us".

Communists, already persecuted since the December 1920 Obznana, responded with violence shortly thereafter. A member of the "Pelagićevci" faction tried to assassinate the King on 29 June. On 21 July, the Minister of the Interior and member of the People's Radical Party Milorad Drašković was assassinated by Alija Alijagić, member of the communist group Red Justice. This led to the imposition of the Law on the Protection of the State in August 1921.

The viability of the constitution dominated the 1923 parliamentary elections.

The Croatian Peasant Party did not accept the legitimacy of the constitution. After the 1925 elections, entry into the government was offered to the party by Nikola Pašić. The Croatian Peasant Party accepted and recognized the constitution. Leader Stjepan Radić was released from prison, along with other party officials.
