= Alois Seyfried =

Austrian executioner

Alois Seyfried (1856–1938) was an executioner active in Austria-Hungary and the Kingdom of Serbs, Croats and Slovenes. He was born in Brunn am Gebirge on 27 May 1856 to Franz and Caroline Seyfried (née Herger). On 1 August 1886, he was appointed temporary executioner (provisorischer Scharfrichter) for Bosnia, which was then under Austro-Hungarian occupation in accordance with the 1878 Treaty of Berlin. On 1 February 1897, Seyfried became the permanent State Executioner for Bosnia.

After World War I, Bosnia became a part of the newly created Kingdom of the Serbs, Croats and Slovenes (later renamed Yugoslavia). Seyfried remained in the service of the new government until his retirement in 1922. Upon his retirement, he stayed in Sarajevo until 1930, when he left for his hometown in Austria, where he died on 9 October 1938.

Seyfried’s two brothers – Jozef (b. 1854) and Rudi (1852–1892) – also worked as executioners in Austria-Hungary. All three had inherited their trade from the Viennese hangman Heinrich Willenbacher, who was either their uncle or Rudolf’s father-in-law. Alois once claimed to have been apprenticed to the Viennese executioner Joseph Lang before leaving for Bosnia. Seyfried was married and had at least one son. According to a news report, his wife was a snake charmer. His son was an amateur painter. Alois himself played the zither and composed musical pieces. His favourite composers were Franz Schubert and Frédéric Chopin.

In his 36-year-long career, Seyfried may have executed more than 50 people, many of them during World War I. The last person whom he executed was Alija Alijagić, who was hanged in Zagreb on 8 March 1922 for the assassination of Interior Minister Milorad Drašković the previous year.
