= Law on the Protection of the State =

1921 law of Yugoslavia

First page of the Law published in a booklet form

The Law on the Protection of the State (Note: Full formal name of the Law: Law on the Protection of Public Security and Order in the State (Serbo-Croatian: Закон о заштити јавне безбедности и поретка у држави, Zakon o zaštiti javne bezbednosti i poretka u državi)) (Serbo-Croatian: Закон о заштити државе, Zakon o zaštiti države) was a piece of legislation enacted in the Kingdom of Serbs, Croats and Slovenes (Yugoslavia) in August 1921. The law was proposed by the government, then adopted in the Parliament on 1 August, and came into force on 2 August. This law banned the Communist Party of Yugoslavia (CPY), stripped all communist MPs of their seats, and defined any kind of "communist propaganda" as a crime against the state punishable with the death sentence. All the communist MPs were immediately indicted by the court and some of them arrested and sentenced to prison sentences. All communist mayors and city councilors were deposed and most of them arrested too.

At the time of the adoption of the law, the CPY was the third largest parliamentary group with 58 seats, and had won municipal elections in many municipalities, including the two largest cities of Belgrade and Zagreb. The state's attitude towards the communists was already negative since the communists have organized several large-scale strikes and protests in the previous 2½ years. In December 1920, the government enacted the Obznana, a semi-official decree that outlawed communist propaganda and communist-affiliated trade unions, but did not outright ban the CPY. This only led to increase in violence as some communists organized several political assassinations. The government accused the leadership of the CPY for the violence, although the latter denied participation and vowed to respect legal forms of action. The government, which was dominated by the Radical and Democratic parties, declared the CPY a subversive and terrorist organization that needs to be banned in order to protect the state from violent overthrow.

The law was quite effective and led to the almost total destruction of the CPY and the League of Communist Youth of Yugoslavia (SKOJ), which both became illegal and went underground. In 1924, the provisions of the Law were also applied to the Croatian Republican Peasant Party after they joined the Bolshevik-organized Peasant International. The Law was amended and expanded in 1929 and again in 1939.

== Background ==
At the 1920 Constitutional Assembly election, the CPY won 58 out of 419 seats, and became the third strongest group in the Parliament. At the 1920 local elections, CPY won majority in many municipal councils in large cities, including Belgrade, Zagreb, Skopje and Podgorica. During the 1918-1920 period, the CPY organized several large-scale worker strikes and protests, culminating with the December 1920 miners strike in Bosnia and Herzegovina that turned into the Husino rebellion in which 7 miners were killed, and hundreds of participants were arrested. The regime saw the CPY as a branch office of Bolsheviks who destroyed the Russian Empire, and regarded them as the main threat to the state's existence. This led the government to enact Obznana on 29 December 1920. Obznana was a semi-official decree that banned communist propaganda and communist-affiliated newspapers and trade unions. This led to large-scale arrests of communists and closure of communist-affiliated organizations and confiscation of their belongings. Only the communist members of the Constituent Assembly, Communist Mayors and city councilors were spared from arrest.

The Constitutional Assembly of the kingdom voted on the Vidovdan Constitution on 28 June 1921, despite a boycott from the communists and other opposition parties.

Factions of the CPY responded by violence. First, on 29 June 1921, bricklayer Spasoje Stejić attempted to assassinate crown prince Alexander in Belgrade using a bomb, but failed. Stejić was a member of secret communist group called "Pelagićevci". Then, on 21 July 1921 in Delnice, carpenter Alija Alijagić assassinated then already former interior minister Milorad Drašković, the main author of the Obznana. Alijagić was a member of the secret youth communist group Red Justice from Zagreb. Although the CPY leadership condemned those terrorist acts, the government accused the CPY leadership (which was made up of communist MPs) for inciting violence. The government claimed that Stejić was given the order to assassinate Alexander from the communist parliamentary group, in the parliament building. This gave pretext to the government for even harsher persecution of the CPY.

== Content ==
The text of the Law on the Protection of the State was short. It banned the CPY and stripped all communists of their seats in the Parliament and in the local councils. The Law defined several "crimes against the state" that are to be punished with either death sentence or up to 20 years in prison:

- Printing or disseminating books, newspapers or posters that present "communist, anarchist or terrorist" propaganda,
- Being a member of any group that promotes communisms, anarchism or terrorism,
- Renting buildings to people who organize communist, anarchist or terrorist activities,
- Inciting mutiny or disobedience in the army,
- Receiving help from abroad or helping someone abroad in order to disturb the public safety,
- Amassing weapons for aforementioned aims,
- Organizing murders of politicians or state officials.

Basically, the law was an upgraded version of the Obznana, which was acknowledged by Pribićević in the Parliament.

== Enactment ==
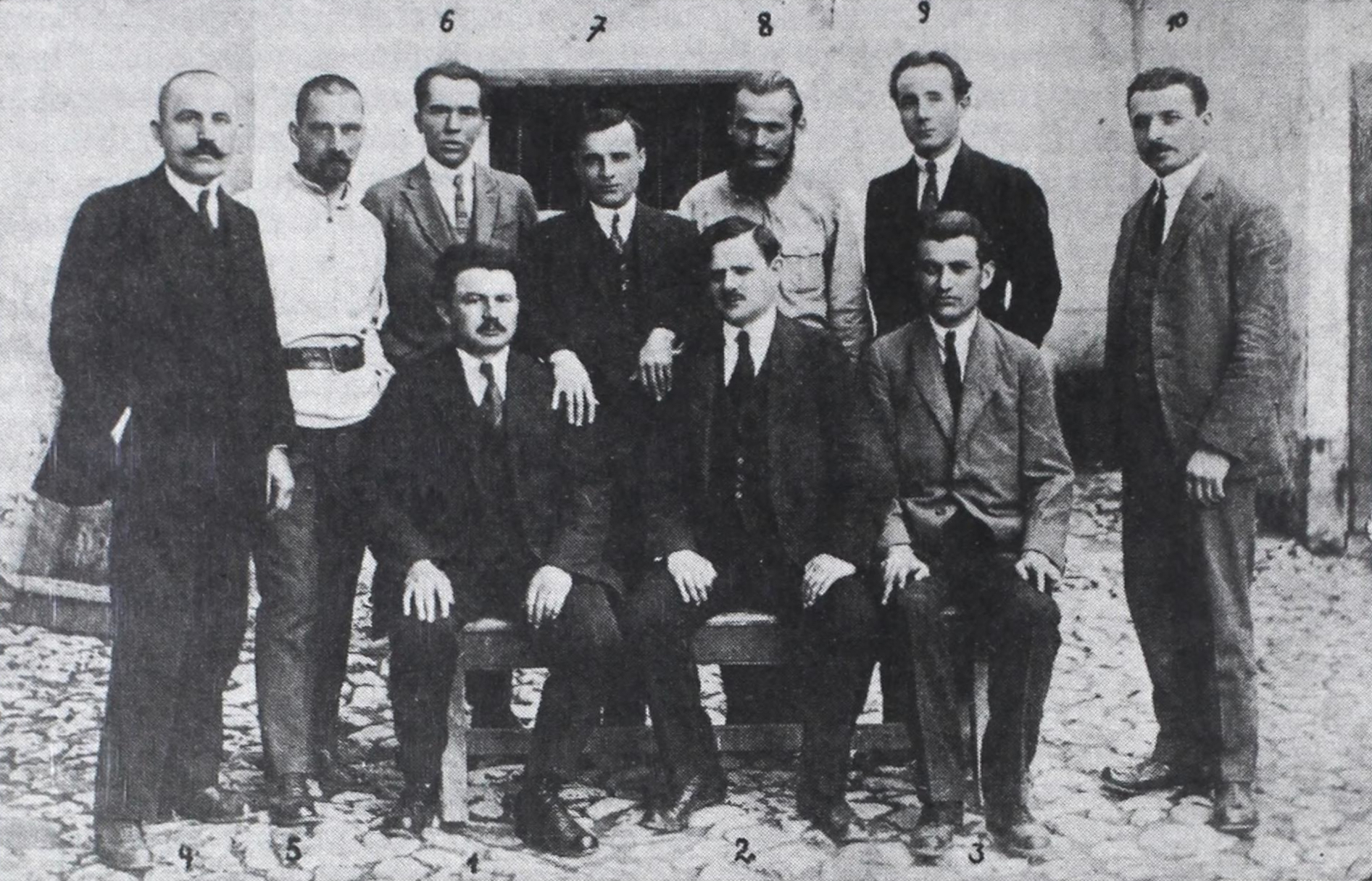
Former communist MPs in prison, 1922. Standing, from left to right: Vladimir Mirić, Vladimir Ćopić, Života Milojković, Lazar Stefanović, Nikola Kovačević, Miloš Trebinjac and Dragomir Marjanović. Seated, from left to right, are Ivan Čolović, Filip Filipović and Đuro Salaj.

The draft of the Law on the Protection of the State was adopted by Government on 27 July 1921. The main aim of the Law was to ban the CPY and to stripped all communists of their seats in the Parliament and in the local councils, and also to ban "writing against state and national unity". The government claimed the law to be based on the similar laws in the US and Switzerland.

The government, then led by the Radical and Democratic parties, proposed the draft of the Law on the Protection of the State to the Parliament on 30 July 1921. In the Parliament, the draft was introduced by Minister of the Interior Svetozar Pribićević and explained by justice minister Marko Đuričić. This was followed by a debate in which communists again tried to deny that they were all terrorists and anarchists. The draft was approved with 190 votes in favor and 54 votes against. Among those voting against were the communists, social-democrats, republicans, Slovene People's Party, Croatian Popular Party, and one member of the Radical Party (Momčilo Ivanić). Beside the democrats and the radicals, the draft was supported by the Agrarian Party, Yugoslav Muslim Organization, Džemijet and People's Socialist Party. The Croatian Republican Peasant Party MPs did not participate in voting as they were boycotting the Parliament. The Law came into force the on 2 August.

=== Reaction ===
Famed jurist Slobodan Jovanović criticized the Law saying that it was "based on the [...] unproven participation of communists in the assassination". Jovanović observed that "the request to rescind the immunity was not explained individually for any communist MP – and this was such a major formal deficiency that it was necessary to refuse the extradition of the request because of it alone." Jaša Prodanović accused the radical-democratic government of "ruthlessness unparalleled in the history of parliamentarism" because, in his oppinion, they violated the inviolability of the parliamentary mandate.

== Consequences ==
The same day the Law was adopted (30 July), the public prosecutor for Belgrade indicted all communist MPs and asked the Parliament to rescind their parliamentary immunity, so that they can be tried according to the newly adopted Law in connection to the Stejić's failed assassination of crown prince. On 1 August, the Parliament voted to rescind the immunity from all communist MPs, except three who left the CPY earlier. This proposal was adopted with the same majority as the Law itself. Nine communist MPs were arrested the same day, while leaving the parliament building. Two more were arrested in September, and two more in October. Others were internally exiled to the place of birth. This was a major blow to both the CPY and its youth wing (SKOJ), which both almost disintegrated and needed decades to recover. Remaining members went underground. The number of CPY members fell from some 60,000 legal members in 1920 to 3,500 underground members in 1929.

The trial of Stejić for the attempted assassination of crown prince started on 25 January 1922. 31 other communists were accused as his accomplices, including 9 (former) communist MPs. Stejić was sentenced to death and others to prison sentences. Former MPs were sentenced to 2 years each, among them Filip Filipović, Đuro Salaj, Vladimir Ćopić, and Nikola Kovačević.

In the ensuing years, many other legal processes were held against communists accused for violating the Law on the Protection of the State. Among those was the Bombers' trial against Josip Broz Tito. Other prominent communists who were imprisoned for violating the Law during the 1920s were Sima Marković (former MP), Đuro Cvijić, Ivan Milutinović, Moša Pijade, Đuro Đaković, Rodoljub Čolaković, and Otokar Keršovani.

After the CPY was banned, the Croatian Republican Peasant Party (HRSS) became the main opposition in the Kingdom. In the 1923 parliamentary election, they won the second largest number of seats, after the Radical Party. In the summer of 1924, HRSS joined the Peasant International, an organization based in Moscow with close ties to the Communist International. Because of this, in December 1924, the government adopted a decree that applied the Law on the Protection of the State on the HRSS. HRSS was banned as a "communist organization". On 2 January 1925, HRSS leaders Vladko Maček, August Košutić, Juraj Krnjević, Josip Predavec and several others were arrested. HRSS president Stjepan Radić was arrested on 5 January. They were all released from prison in July 1925, after HRSS decided to distance itself from the communists, accept the monarchist constitution and rename itself to the Croatian Peasant Party (HSS). Immediately after their release, HSS members joined the Government and S. Radić became the minister of education in November 1925.

== Later amendments ==
On 6 January 1929, when King Alexander of Yugoslavia proclaimed the 6th January Dictatorship, the Vidovdan Constitution and the Parliament were abolished and King overtook direct government of the state. The same day, the Law on the Protection of the State was amended and the Tribunal for Protection of the State was also established. This brought even harsher persecution of communists, many of whom were killed by the police or died in prison (Đaković, Nikola Hećimović, Seven Secretaries of the SKOJ). The amended Law had additional paragraphs prohibiting, beside communist and anarchist, all political parties that were deemed "religious" or "tribal" (meaning exclusively Serbian, exclusively Muslim, etc).

The Law was further amended in 1939, which led to the establishment of concentration camps for communists in Bileća and Lepoglava. The Law on the Protection of the State was formally abolished in 1943 by the Yugoslav government-in-exile.

== See also ==
- 1922 Law for the Protection of the Republic in the Weimar Republic
- 1924 State Protection Act, in Bulgaria
- 1931 Law for the Defense of the Republic, in Spain
