= Bombers' trial =

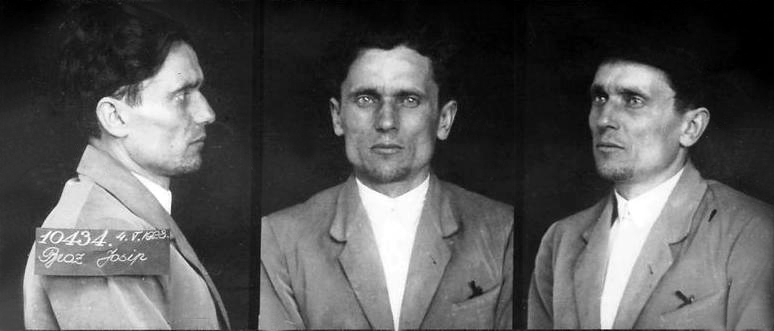
Tito's 1928 mugshot

Bombers' trial (Serbo-Croatian: Бомбашки процес, romanized: Bombaški proces) was a trial of Josip Broz Tito and five other defendants before the Royal Court in Zagreb, held in November 1928. The six defendants were accused of spreading communist propaganda (which was made illegal in the Kingdom of Serbs, Croats and Slovenes by Obznana in 1920), and for unauthorized possession of weapons and ammunition. The name "Bombers' trial" was given by the media because the police found four bombs, among other firearms, in the house where Tito and his associates were arrested. During the trial, Tito admitted being member of the illegal Communist Party of Yugoslavia (CPY), but claimed the bombs were planted by the police. He also said that he does not recognize the authority of the bourgeoise court and would only recognize the authority of his party to try him. Tito was sentenced to five years, while two of his accomplices were sentenced to three and two years. The other three defendants were acquitted.
