= Red Justice =

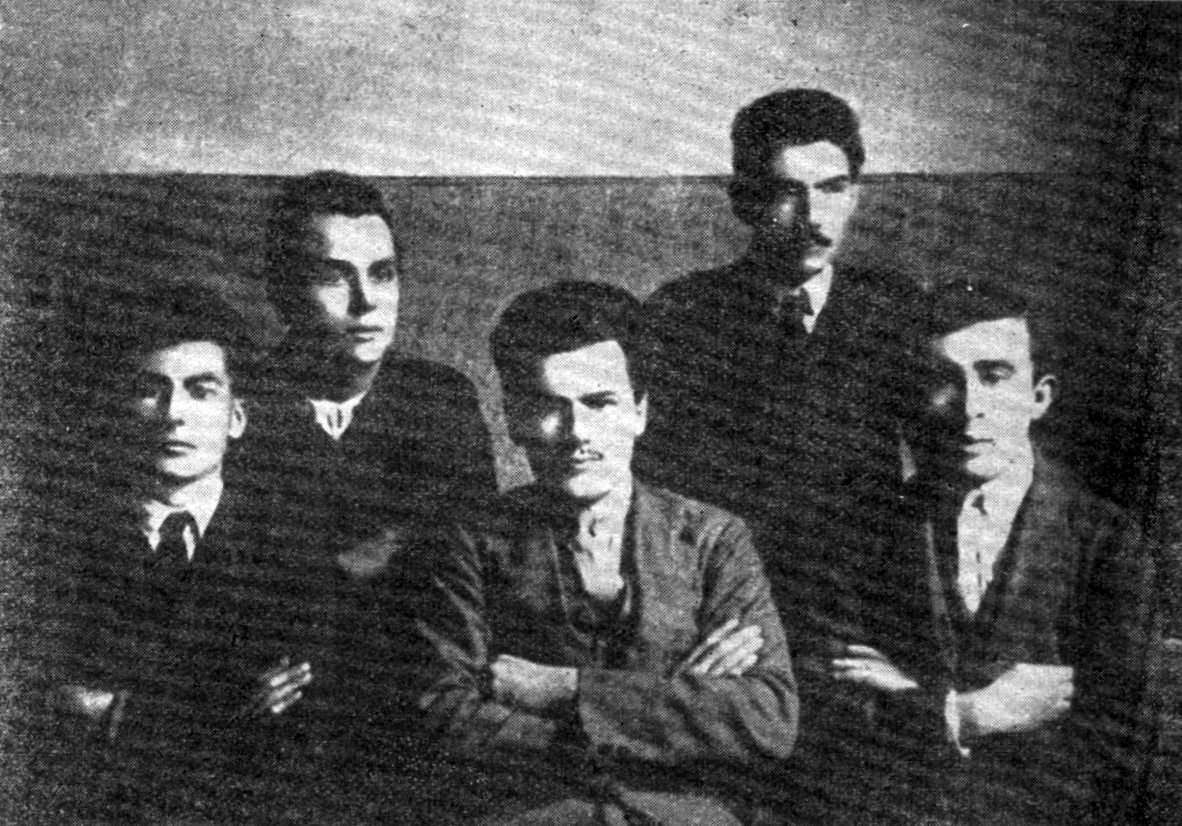
Members of the Crvena pravda included, from right to left: Alija Alijagić, Nikola Petrović, Rodoljub Čolaković, Stevo Ivanović and Dinko Lopandić

Red Justice (Serbo-Croatian: Crvena pravda) was a faction of the Communist Party of Yugoslavia (KPJ) that was known for terrorist acts against the government of the Kingdom of Yugoslavia.

On 30 December 1920, the government issued Obznana, a decree outlawing the KPJ. Another communist faction, the "Pelagićevci", attempted to assassinate the Regent Alexander on 28 June 1921. On 21 July, a member of Red Justice Alija Alijagić killed former Interior Minister Milorad Drašković. This led to the authorities proclaiming the Law on the Protection of the Realm, turning the KPJ ban into legislation on 2 August. It caused the annulment of the KPJ seats in the national assembly two days later, and numerous covert police agents infiltrating the KPJ.

== Sources ==
- Tomasevich, Jozo (2001). War and Revolution in Yugoslavia, 1941–1945: Occupation and Collaboration. Stanford, California: Stanford University Press. ISBN 978-0-8047-0857-9.
- Banac, Ivo (1988). With Stalin against Tito: Cominformist Splits in Yugoslav Communism. Ithaca, New York: Cornell University Press. ISBN 0-8014-2186-1.
