= Milorad Drašković =

Serbian politician (1873–1921)

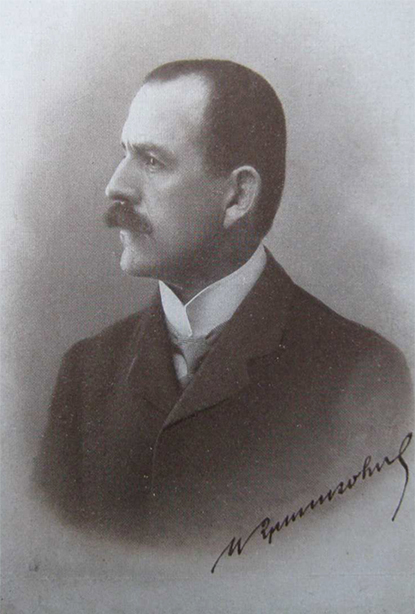
- Drašković in 1920

Minister of Internal Affairs of the Kingdom of Serbs, Croats and Slovenes
- In office 1 January 1921 – 21 July 1921
- Preceded by: Ljubomir Davidović
- Succeeded by: Svetozar Pribićević

Minister of Finance of the Kingdom of Serbs, Croats and Slovenes
- In office 3 January 1921 – 31 March 1921
- Preceded by: Kosta Stojanović
- Succeeded by: Kosta Kumanudi

Minister of Defence of the Kingdom of Serbs, Croats and Slovenes
- In office 26 March 1921 – 24 May 1921
- Preceded by: Branko Jovanović
- Succeeded by: Stevan Hadžić

Personal details
- Born: 10 April 1873 Polom, Principality of Serbia (now Serbia)
- Died: 21 July 1921 (aged 48) Delnice, Kingdom of Serbs, Croats and Slovenes (now Croatia)
- Cause of death: Assassination
- Resting place: Belgrade New Cemetery
- Party: Democratic Party
- Relations: Rasha Drachkovitch (grandson)
- Children: Radoje, Bojana, Slobodan and Milorad
- Education: University of Belgrade Faculty of Law

Milorad Drašković (Serbian Cyrillic: Милорад Драшковић; 10 April 1873 – 21 July 1921) was a Serbian politician who was the Minister of Internal Affairs of the Kingdom of Serbs, Croats and Slovenes.

== Death ==
Drašković was a staunch anti-communist and enacted several pieces of anti-communist legislation, notably the Obznana. On 21 July 1921, Drašković was gunned down by Alija Alijagić, a member of the communist organization Crvena Pravda. The Communist Party of Yugoslavia condemned the act. Nevertheless, this inspired King Alexander to enact a law concerning protection of the state that made the communist party illegal.

== Personal life ==
He had four children: Radoje, Bojana, Slobodan, and Milorad.

His son Slobodan was sent to a Nazi concentration camp in the Second World War and later emigrated to the United States. There he became a member of the Serbian National Defense Council as well as the John Birch Society but later left due to being disillusioned with its pacifism.

== Notes ==
1. Acting Minister of Finance as Kosta Stojanović died while in office.
2. Acting Minister of Defense as General Branko Jovanović died while in office.
