= Obznana =

Government decree of the Socialist Federal Republic of Yugoslavia

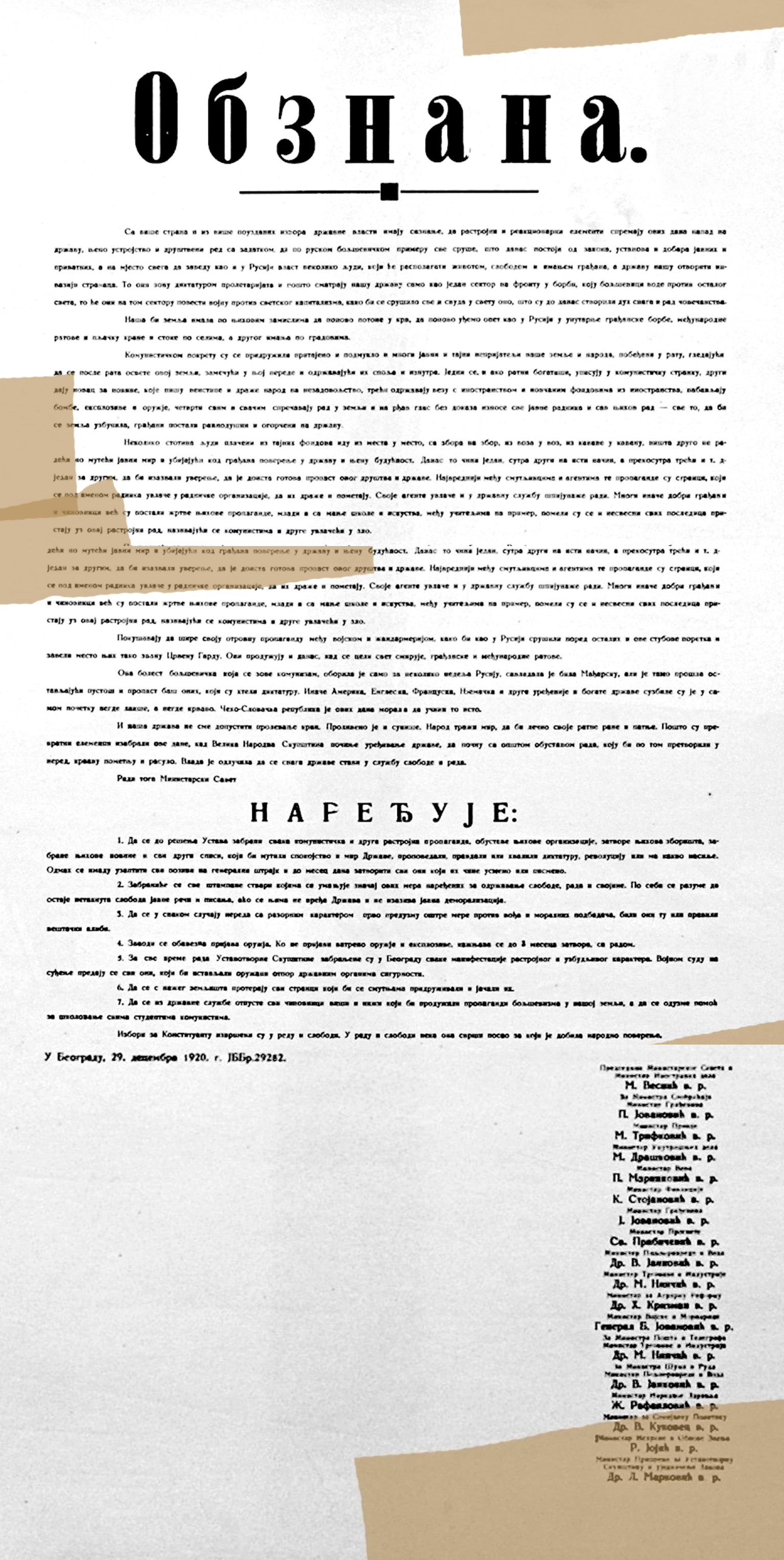
Copy of the Obznana

The Obznana (Cyrillic: Обзнана; Serbo-Croatian for "Proclamation") was a government decree that was issued on 29 December 1920 in the Kingdom of Serbs, Croats and Slovenes (Yugoslavia), which mandated closure of all organizations, trade unions and newspapers associated with the Communist Party of Yugoslavia (CPY). It also banned any kind of communist propaganda, stipulating that any person accused of "bolshevik propaganda" should be fired from a public job.

The decree came after the Communist Party's relatively strong showing in the 1920 Constitutional Assembly election, after which the regime viewed them as the main threat to the system of government. The Obznana was not adopted by the parliament, nor signed by the King, as was usual; instead, it was authored by the Minister of the Interior Milorad Drašković and signed by government ministers including the prime minister Milenko Vesnić. Although the Obznana was not an official document and was never published in the official gazette, the proclamation was printed as a poster and pasted on the streets, marking the beginning of a widespread persecution of communists in Yugoslavia.

A series of political murders followed, of both communists and regime officials alike, including Drašković's assassination in July 1921. The crisis culminated with the August 1921 adoption of the Law on the Protection of the State. The Law prescribed heavy prison sentences for any kind of communist propaganda, and led to a complete crackdown on communists in the kingdom.

== Background ==
After the formation of the Kingdom of Serbs, Croats and Slovenes (December 1918), the new state was nominally ruled by the democratic institutions, with the Temporary National Parliament as a legislature. In realty, the executive (Council of Ministers), dominated by the People's Radical Party, ruled by decree with little input from the Parliament. The most notable example was the Interim Decree on the Preparation of the Agrarian Reform (February 1919).

Socialist movement was already existing on the territory of the new kingdom from the pre-World War I period. In what was then Austria-Hungary, the Social Democratic Party of Croatia and Slavonia (SDPCS) came into existence in 1894, two years before the Yugoslav Social-Democratic Party (Jugoslovanska socialdemokratska stranka, JSDS) was set up in Slovene lands. The Serbian Social Democratic Party (SSDP) was founded in 1903. In Bosnia and Herzegovina, the Social Democratic Party of Bosnia and Herzegovina (SDPBH) was established in 1909. The Unification congress of the Socialist Labor Party of Yugoslavia (Communists) was held in Belgrade on 20–23 April 1919 as consolidation on the left of the political spectrum. Clashes continued within the party between leftists and centrists—the latter favoring pursuit of reforms through a parliamentary system. The leftist faction prevailed at the second congress held in Vukovar on 20–24 June 1920 and adopted a new statute. That aligned the party entirely with the Communist International (Comintern), implementing all instructions received from the Comintern. Furthermore, the party was renamed the Communist Party of Yugoslavia (CPY). Filip Filipović and Sima Marković, both former SSDP activists, were elected to lead the CPY. By May 1920, the CPY had about 50,000 members, and numerous sympathizers largely drawn from among 300,000 members of trade unions and youth organizations.

In the 1920 Constitutional Assembly election, the CPY won 58 out of 419 seats. The electoral performance was, in part, a result of dissatisfaction of industrial workers in Serbia, especially Belgrade, with unpaid wages—a consequence of wartime damage to infrastructure. A further circumstance contributing to the CPY's electoral results were protest votes against the regime in electoral districts where few other protest vote options existed such as Montenegro and Macedonia. The CPY received a significant number of protest votes in Dalmatia as well. The best results were achieved in large cities, in Montenegro and Macedonia. In light of difficult economic and social circumstances, the regime viewed the CPY as the main threat to the system of government. In response to the CPY's electoral success at the local and regional level including Belgrade and Zagreb earlier that year in March–August, and at the national level in November, the Democratic Party and the People's Radical Party advocated prohibition of communist activity.

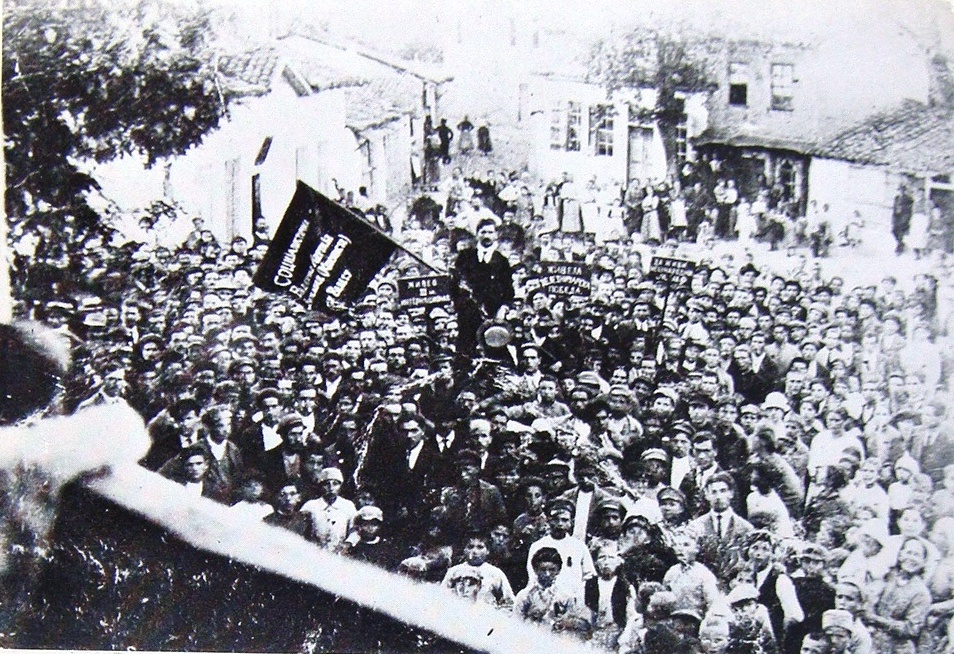
Communist-led rail workers' strike in Veles, April 1920

The CPY organized several large-scale protests and worker strikes. The most notable of these were the protest against international intervention in Russia and Hungary (21-22 July 1919) and the railroad workers' strike (April 1920) in which 50,000 strikers participated and to which the regime responded by militarizing the railroads. On 24 April 1920, during the railroad workers' strike, police opened fire on strikers in Ljubljana, killing 13 people. Trade union members and leaders were routinely persecuted by the police for "bolshevik activity". The regime saw the CPY as a branch office of Bolsheviks who destroyed the Russian Empire, the historical ally of the Serbs.

== Proclamation ==
The culmination of the series of communist-led strikes came in December 1920 when the union of miners of Bosnia and Herzegovina called for general strike. On 24 December, the Council of ministers proclaimed a decree that called for militarization of any district where miner strike occurs. The strikes soon spread to Slovenia. In a few days, the miners strike turned into the Husino rebellion in which 7 miners were killed, and hundreds of participants were arrested. In solidarity with the Bosnian miners, the communist-led Central Trade Union Council of Yugoslavia called for a general strike of all workers to be held on 30 December. This was a signal to the government for an all-out attack on the communists. The announced general strike was held only in Zagreb where police tried, but failed to prevent it, although several dozen strikers were wounded in the clash with the police.

The Obznana was written by the Interior minister Milorad Drašković and signed by the Council of Ministers on 29 December 1920, then printed as posters and pasted on the streets of Belgrade during the night between 29 and 30 December (later also in other cities). Prime minister Milenko Vesnić already resigned few days earlier, so the whole Council of ministers that signed the document was in lame duck. Already on 30 December, the police closed all communist-affiliated workers unions and confiscated their property and archives. Communist organizations were banned and all their property confiscated. All communist-affiliated newspapers were closed down too. Although communists and their sympathizers have been already persecuted by the police for two years, the Obznana came as a surprise to the leadership of the CPY. They were not prepared, and gave little resistance to this development.

=== Content ===
Obznana did not outlaw the CPY as such, but it did prohibit "communist propaganda".

In the introduction, Obznana explained how the government has strong evidence that the communists plan to overthrow the Kingdom and form a Soviet-style government instead. Then it explains that the communists are planning a bloody civil war and that they are being financed by the enemies of the state. It claims that the communist propaganda has infected many naive citizens and trade unions, and that the communists actively work to demoralize the army and the police. After that, the citizens are warned not to allow communist revolution as it happened in Russia and in Hungary. After this introduction, the decree orders:

1. Any kind of communist propaganda to be banned until the adoption of the constitution. Also, all communist-associated organizations, newspapers and meeting houses are to be closed. Any person who calls for a general strike should be arrested and imprisoned for a month.
2. Any printed publication that "reduces the importance of this decree" is to be banned.
3. In case of "disorder with a destructive character", leaders and moral supporters are to be punished.
4. Every citizen possessing firearms has to register it with the police. If unregistered firearm or explosive is found, owner is to be punished with three months' imprisoned .
5. During the convocation of the Constituent Assembly, all "manifestations of disruptive or exciting character" in Belgrade are to be banned. Whoever tries armed resistance against the state is to be taken to the military court.
6. Any foreign citizen involved in "disturbances" is to be banished from the state.
7. Any civil servant who engages in "bolshevik propaganda" is to be fired. Communist students are to be denied of state scholarships.

== Reactions ==
Famed jurist Slobodan Jovanović criticized Obznana because of its antidemocratic character. He pointed out that it was actually a quasi-decree because it was not adopted by the Parliament, was not signed by the King, and especially because it was not promulgated in the official government gazette, as was obligatory for any decree to take effect. Thus, in his opinion, the decree had no real power and was only intended to be used as a mean of political pressure.

The Obznana was also criticized by many liberal-leaning politicians and public intellectuals. Stojan Protić called it "unique in political theory and practice". Although he did not dispute the right of the state to protect it from the violent overthrow, he criticized the way Obznana was issued. Protić said that Obznana is contrary to all the laws of the state and that it denies basic citizens rights. The Republican Party organized a protest rally against the Obznana on 2 January 1921. The main speaker at the rally was Jaša Prodanović. The police dispersed the rally. Ljubomir Stojanović and Mihailo Ilić, leaders of the Republican Party, called Obznana a "coup d'état that puts the citizen outside of the law".

In the Constituent Assembly (Parliament), Communist deputies argued that their party never abandoned legal forms of action and that accusations against them about anti-state activities are false. In January 1921, communists proposed two acts on the revocation of Obznana. Both were introduced only in March. On 8 April 1921, Parliament debated the Obznana. Drašković defended it as necessary to protect the state from violent communist revolution. He said that CPY abused trade unions and strikes as a means of fight against the state, that CPY was financed from abroad and that it was actively demoralizing the Army. He called communists "bloodthirsty and eager for bloody civil war". He agreed that the Obznana was illegal, but called it the only way to prevent the communist violence. Communist deputies Sima Marković and Pavle Pavlović vehemently denied those accusations. Only deputies from the CPY, Social-Democratic Party and one Republican Party deputy criticized the contents of the Obznana. Others either fully supported it (Democratic Party and Radical Party), or criticized only the way it was issued (Croatian Husbandmen's Party, Agrarian Party). In the end, majority supported the Government and Obznana, and communist proposals were defeated. Deputies of the Communist, Agrarian, Social-Democratic, Republican, and Croatian Husbandmen's Parties, and one member of the Radical Party (Momčilo Ivanić) voted against.

== Aftermath ==
During the first three weeks after the proclamation of Obznana, thousands of communists and their sympathizers were arrested, beaten or even killed by the police. Just in Belgrade, more than a thousand people were arrested, many of whom were then sentenced to prison and internally exiled to the place of birth. On 1 January 1921, police killed communist activist Stjepan Supanc in Vukovar. Many teachers, professors and other public workers who were accused of communist activity were fired. Only the communist members of the Constituent Assembly, Communist Mayors and city councilors were spared from arrest, at least until July 1921.

On 29 June 1921, bricklayer Spasoje Stejić attempted to assassinate regent Alexander in Belgrade using a bomb, but failed. Stejić was a member of secret communist group called "Pelagićevci". On 21 July 1921 in Delnice, carpenter Alija Alijagić assassinated then already former Interior Minister Drašković, the main author of the Obznana. Alijagić was member of secret youth communist group Red Justice from Zagreb. Although the CPY leadership condemned those terrorist acts, this gave pretext to the government for even harsher persecution of the CPY.

CPY was totally banned in August 1921 with the adoption of the Law on the Protection of the State. The subsequent events caused a gradual disintegration of the CPY, which needed decades to recover.
