= Alija Alijagić =

Bosnian communist (1895–1922)

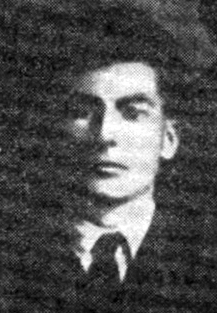
- Alijagić in 1921
- Born: 20 November 1896; Bijeljina, Bosnia and Herzegovina, Austria-Hungary
- Died: 8 March 1922 (aged 25); Zagreb, Kingdom of Serbs, Croats and Slovenes
- Cause of death: Execution by hanging

Alija Alijagić (20 November 1896 – 8 March 1922) was a Bosnian communist who is best known for assassinating Milorad Drašković, the Minister of the Interior of the Kingdom of Serbs, Croats and Slovenes.

The Communist Party of Yugoslavia condemned the act by Red Justice. Nevertheless, this inspired King Alexander to make a law concerning protection of the state that made the communist party illegal.

For the assassination, Alijagić was found guilty of murder and sentenced to death. He was hanged in Zagreb in 1922. The execution was carried out by Alois Seyfried. Several other conspirators in the assassination received prison sentences.

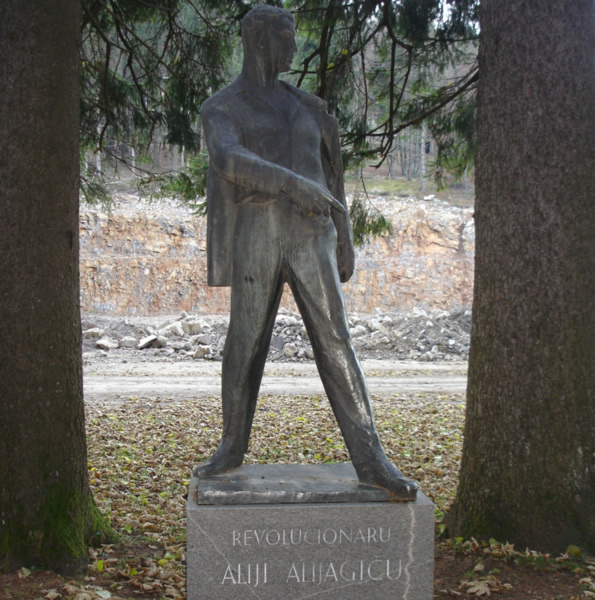
A monument to Alijagić was later erected in Delnice, near the site of the assassination, in today's King Tomislav Park.
