= Kingdom of Yugoslavia =

Yugoslavia from 1918 to 1941

Kingdom of Serbs, Croats and Slovenes (1918–1929) Kraljevina Srba, Hrvata i Slovenaca Краљевина Срба, Хрвата и Словенаца (Serbo-Croatian) Kraljevina Srbov, Hrvatov in Slovencev (Slovene) Kingdom of Yugoslavia (1929–1941) Kraljevina Jugoslavija (Serbo-Croatian Latin and Slovene) Краљевина Југославија (Serbo-Croatian Cyrillic)
- 1918–1941
- Flag Greater coat of arms
- Motto: Jedan narod, jedan kralj, jedna država Један народ, један краљ, једна држава "One People, One King, One State"
- Anthem: Himna Kraljevine Jugoslavije; Химна Краљевине Југославије "Anthem of the Kingdom of Yugoslavia"
- Location of Kingdom of Yugoslavia in 1930 (green) in Europe (dark grey)
- Capital and largest city: Belgrade; 44°48′35″N 20°27′47″E
- Official languages: Serbo-Croato-Slovene^{[a]}
- Common languages: German, Hungarian, Albanian, Bulgarian, Macedonian dialects, Romanian, Aromanian, Megleno-Romanian, Romani, Ladino, Italian
- Demonym: Yugoslav
- Government: Unitary parliamentary constitutional monarchy (1918–1929, 1931–1939): under a one-party royal dictatorship (1929–1931); under federalism (1939–1941)
- King
  - 1918–1921: Peter I
  - 1921–1934: Alexander I
  - 1934–1941: Peter II^{[b]}
- Prince Regent
  - 1918–1921: Prince Alexander
  - 1934–1941: Prince Paul
- Prime Minister
  - 1918–1919 (first): Stojan Protić
  - 1941 (last): Dušan Simović
- Legislature: Provisional Representation (1919–1920); National Assembly^{[c]} (1920–1941)
  - Upper house: Senate (since 1931)
  - Lower house: Chamber of Deputies (since 1931)
- Historical era: Interwar period • World War II
  - Established: 1 December 1918
  - Vidovdan Constitution: 28 June 1921
  - 6 Jan. Dictatorship: 6 January 1929
  - Octroic Constitution: 3 September 1931
  - King assassinated: 9 October 1934
  - Sporazum in Croatia: 25 August 1939
  - Joined the Axis: 25 March 1941
  - Coup d'état: 27 March 1941
  - Axis invasion: 6 April 1941
  - Government-in-exile: April 1941
  - Provisional government: 7 March 1945
  - Monarchy abolished: 29 November 1945

Area
- 1941: 247,542 km^{2} (95,577 sq mi)

Population
  - 1918: 12,017,323
  - 1931: 13,934,000
  - 1941: 15,839,364
- Currency: Yugoslav krone (1918–1920); Yugoslav dinar (1920–1941)
Preceded by
Kingdom of Serbia
State of Slovenes, Croats and Serbs
Kingdom of Hungary (Vojvodina)
Tsardom of Bulgaria (Western Outlands)
Succeeded by
German-occupied Serbia
Italian governorate of Montenegro
Independent State of Croatia
Kingdom of Italy
Tsardom of Bulgaria
Kingdom of Hungary
Italian protectorate of Albania
Nazi Germany
Yugoslav govt.-in-exile
- 1. Serbian and Croatian, highly mutually intelligible standard languages, were officially considered eastern and western varieties of a common language, contemporarily known as Serbo-Croatian. Slovene was considered a dialect of the common language despite low mutual intelligibility with Serbo-Croatian. 'Serbo-Croato-Slovene' was declared the single official language (srbsko-hrvatsko-slovenački or srbsko-hrvatsko-slovenski; also translated "Serbocroatoslovenian"). In practice it functioned as Serbo-Croatian.; 2. Peter II, still underage, was declared an adult by a military coup. Shortly after his assumption of royal authority, Yugoslavia was occupied by the Axis and the young King went into exile. In 1944, he accepted the formation of Democratic Federal Yugoslavia. He was deposed by the Yugoslav parliament in 1945.; 3. Unicameral until 1931.

The Kingdom of Yugoslavia was a country in Southeast and Central Europe that existed from 1918 until 1941. From 1918 to 1929, it was officially called the Kingdom of Serbs, Croats, and Slovenes and was colloquially known as Yugoslavia (lit. 'Land of the South Slavs') due to its origins.

The preliminary kingdom was formed in late 1918 by the unification of the Kingdom of Serbia, which was previously independent, with the Kingdom of Montenegro, and the territories of the former Austro-Hungarian Empire, mainly the provisional State of Slovenes, Croats and Serbs (encompassing what is now Bosnia and Herzegovina and most of what are now the states of Croatia and Slovenia) as well as Banat, Bačka and Baranja. The regions of Kosovo and what is today North Macedonia had become parts of Serbia prior to the unification.

The state was ruled by the Serbian dynasty of Karađorđević, which previously ruled the Kingdom of Serbia under Peter I, who became the first king of Yugoslavia, reigning until his death in 1921. He was succeeded by his son Alexander I, who had been regent for his father. In 1929, he established the 6 January Dictatorship, and soon renamed the kingdom Yugoslavia. In 1934, the king was assassinated in Marseille by Vlado Chernozemski, a member of the Internal Macedonian Revolutionary Organization (IMRO), during his visit to France. The crown passed to his 11-year-old son, Peter. Alexander's cousin Paul ruled as Prince regent until 1941, when Peter II came of age following a coup d'etat that reversed Yugoslavia's accession to the Tripartite Pact. The royal family flew to London the same year, prior to the country being invaded by the Axis powers.

In April 1941, the country was occupied and partitioned by the Axis powers. A royal government-in-exile, recognized by the United Kingdom and, later, by all the Allies, was established in London. In 1944, after pressure from the British Prime Minister Winston Churchill, the King recognized the government of Democratic Federal Yugoslavia as the legitimate government. This was established on 2 November following the signing of the Treaty of Vis by Ivan Šubašić (on behalf of the Kingdom) and Josip Broz Tito (on behalf of the Yugoslav Partisans).

== Formation ==
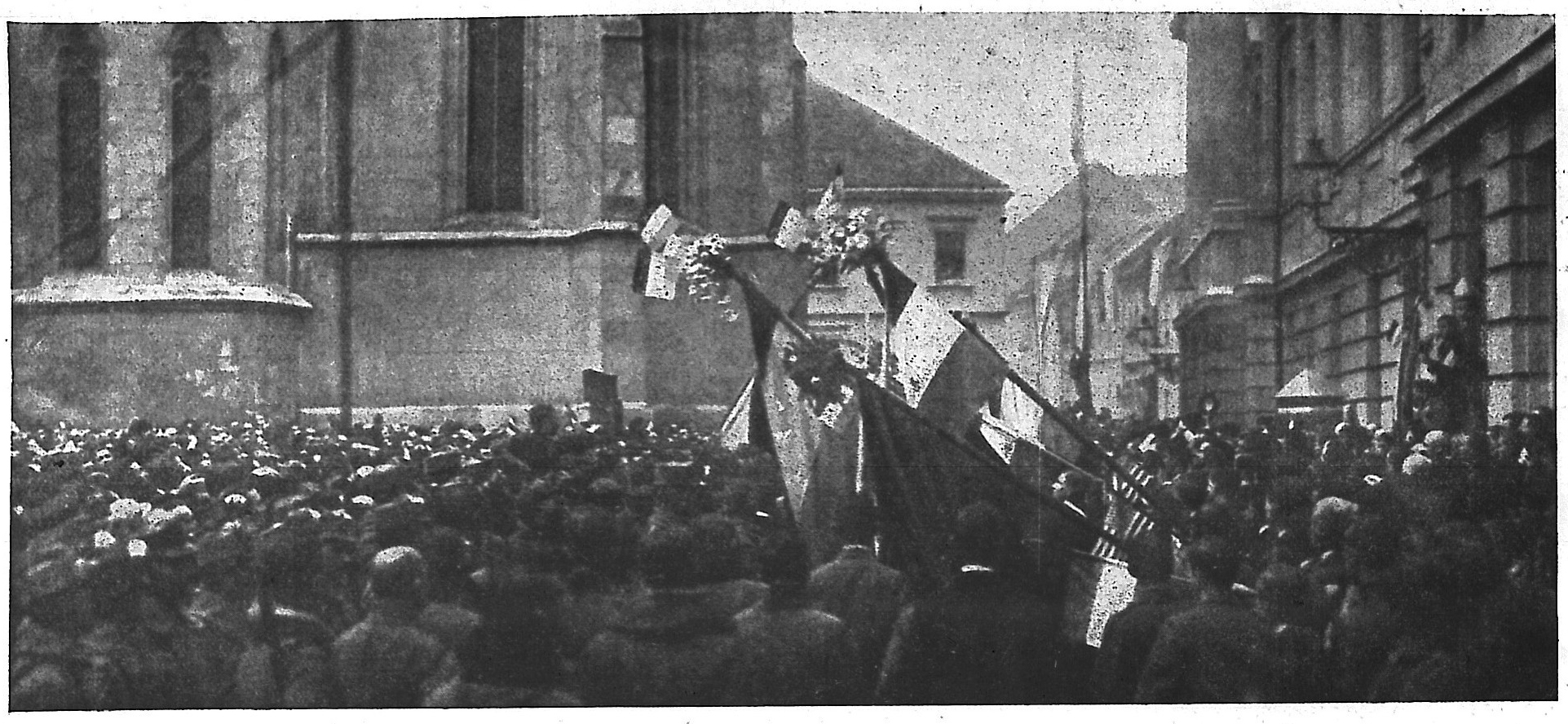
Celebrations in Zagreb during the formation of the National Council of the State of Slovenes, Croats and Serbs, October 1918

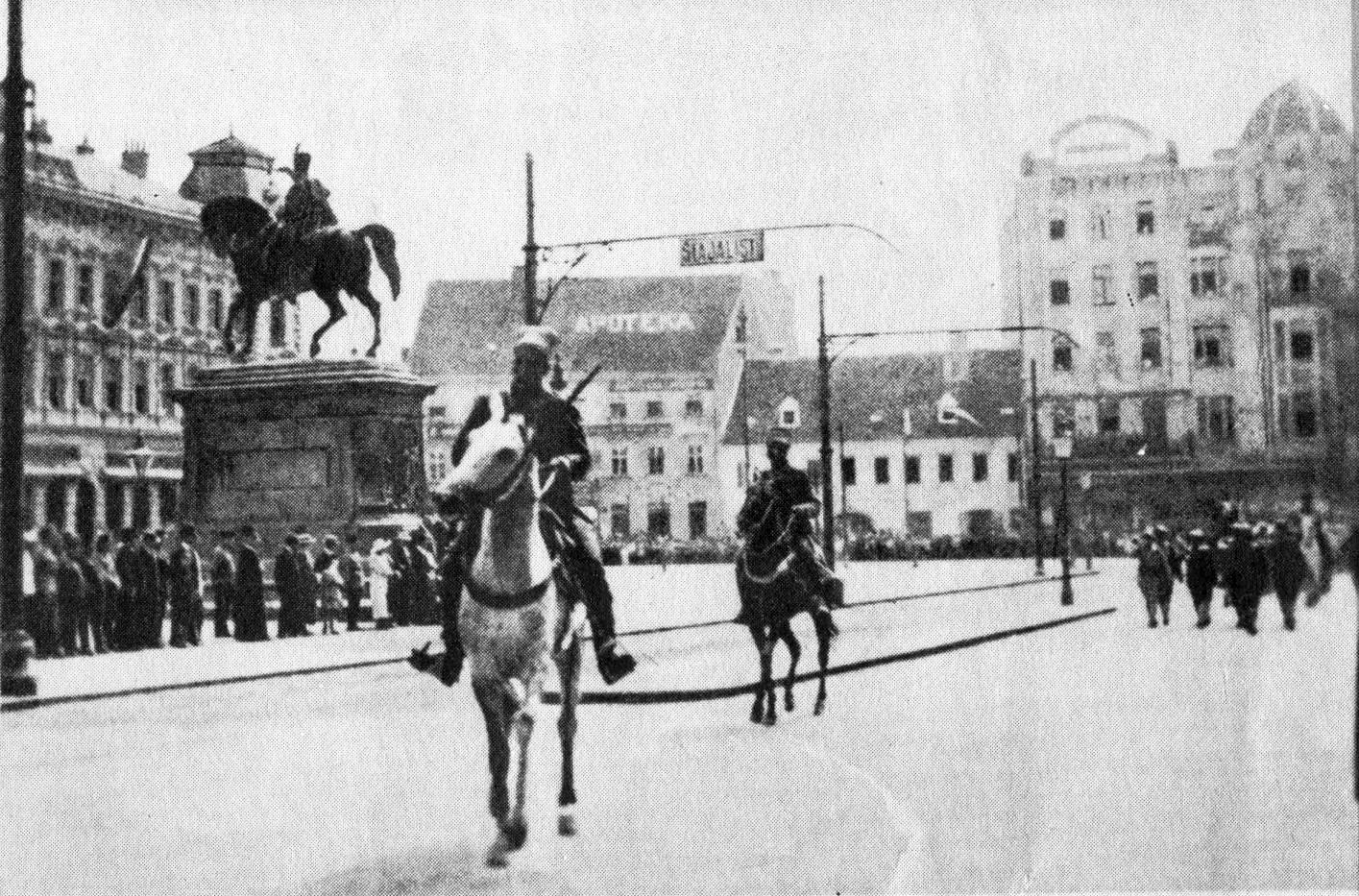
Serbian Army in Zagreb's Ban Jelačić Square in 1918

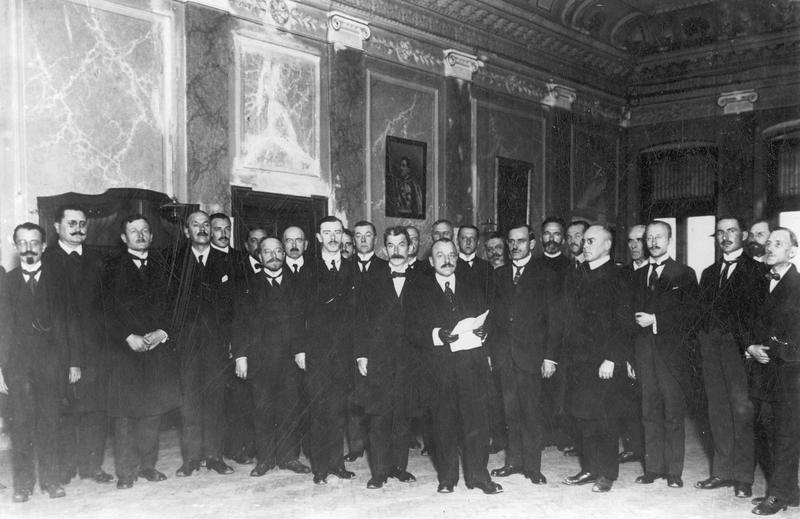
Delegation of the National Council of the State of Slovenes, Croats and Serbs led by Ante Pavelić reading the address in front of regent Alexander, 1 December 1918

Following the assassination of Archduke Franz Ferdinand of Austria by the Bosnian Serb Gavrilo Princip and the outbreak of World War I, Serbia was invaded and occupied by a combined Bulgarian, Austrian and German force on 6 October 1915. This saw the escalation of South Slavic nationalism and calls by Slavic nationalists for the independence and unification of the South Slavic nationalities of Austria-Hungary along with Serbia and Montenegro into a single State of Slovenes, Croats and Serbs.

The Dalmatian Croat politician Ante Trumbić became a prominent South Slavic leader during the war and led the Yugoslav Committee that lobbied the Allies to support the creation of an independent Yugoslavia. Trumbić faced initial hostility from Serbian Prime Minister Nikola Pašić, who preferred an enlarged Serbia over a unified Yugoslav state. However, both Pašić and Trumbić agreed to a compromise, which was delivered at the Corfu Declaration on 20 July 1917 that advocated the creation of a united state of Serbs, Croats, and Slovenes to be led by the Serbian House of Karađorđević.

In 1916, the Yugoslav Committee started negotiations with the Serbian Government in exile, on which they decided on the creation of the Kingdom of Yugoslavia, declaring the joint Corfu Declaration in 1917, the meetings were held at the Municipal Theatre of Corfu.

In November 1918, the National Council of the State of Slovenes, Croats and Serbs appointed 28 members to start negotiation with the representatives of the government of the Kingdom of Serbia and Montenegro on creation of a new Yugoslav state, the delegation negotiated directly with regent Alexander Karađorđević. The negotiations would end, with the delegation of the National Council of the State of Slovenes, Croats and Serbs led by Ante Pavelić reading the address in front of regent Alexander, who represented his father, King Peter I of Serbia (the king of Serbia since the May Coup of 1903), by which acceptance the kingdom was established.

Austria-Hungary collapsed after World War I, and the subsequent Treaty of Trianon in 1920 established the borders of Kingdom of Hungary, and Vojvodina was ceded to Kingdom of Serbs, Croats and Slovenes.

The name of the new Yugoslav state was Kingdom of Serbs, Croats and Slovenes (Serbo-Croatian: Kraljevina Srba, Hrvata i Slovenaca / Краљевина Срба, Хрвата и Словенаца; Slovene: Kraljevina Srbov, Hrvatov in Slovencev) or its abbreviated form Kingdom of SCS (Kraljevina SHS / Краљевина СХС).

The new kingdom was made up of the formerly independent kingdoms of Serbia and Montenegro (Montenegro having been absorbed into Serbia the previous month), and of a substantial amount of territory that was formerly part of Austria-Hungary, the State of Slovenes, Croats and Serbs. The main states which formed the new Kingdom were the State of Slovenes, Croats and Serbs; Vojvodina; and the Kingdom of Serbia with the Kingdom of Montenegro.

The creation of the state was supported by pan-Slavists and Yugoslav nationalists. For the pan-Slavic movement, all of the South Slav (Yugoslav) people had united into a single state. The creation was also supported by the Allies, who sought to break up the Austro-Hungarian Empire.

The newly established Kingdom of Serbs, Croats and Slovenes participated in the Paris Peace Conference with Trumbić as the country's representative. Since the Allies had lured the Italians into the war with a promise of substantial territorial gains in exchange, which cut off a quarter of Slovene ethnic territory from the remaining three-quarters of Slovenes living in the Kingdom of SCS, Trumbić successfully vouched for the inclusion of most Slavs living in the former Austria-Hungary to be included within the borders of the new Kingdom of Serbs, Croats and Slovenes. Nevertheless, with the Treaty of Rapallo a population of half a million South Slavs, mostly Slovenes, were subjected to forced Italianization until the fall of Fascism in Italy. At the time when Benito Mussolini was willing to modify the Rapallo borders in order to annex the independent state of Rijeka to Italy, Pašić's attempts to correct the borders at Postojna and Idrija were effectively undermined by the regent Alexander who preferred "good relations" with Italy.

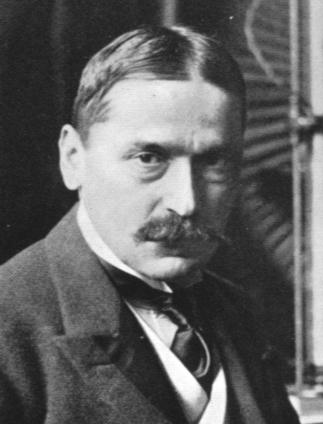
Mihajlo Pupin, Serbian physicist and physical chemist. He influenced the final decisions of the Paris Peace Conference when the borders of the Kingdom were drawn.

The Yugoslav kingdom bordered Italy and Austria to the northwest at the Rapallo border, Hungary and Romania to the north, Bulgaria to the east, Greece and Albania to the south, and the Adriatic Sea to the west. Almost immediately, it ran into disputes with most of its neighbours. Slovenia was difficult to determine, since it had been an integral part of Austria for 400 years. The Vojvodina region was disputed with Hungary, Macedonia with Bulgaria, Rijeka with Italy.

A plebiscite was also held in the Province of Carinthia, which opted to remain in Austria. Austrians had formed a majority in this region although numbers reflected that some Slovenes did vote for Carinthia to become part of Austria. The Dalmatian port city of Zadar and a few of the Dalmatian islands were given to Italy. The city of Rijeka was declared to be the Free State of Fiume, but it was soon occupied, and in 1924 annexed, by Italy, which had also been promised the Dalmatian coast during World War I, and Yugoslavia claiming Istria, a part of the former Austrian Littoral which had been annexed to Italy, but which contained a considerable population of Croats and Slovenes.

The formation of the Vidovdan Constitution in 1921 sparked tensions between the different Yugoslav ethnic groups. Trumbić opposed the 1921 constitution and over time grew increasingly hostile towards the Yugoslav government that he saw as being centralized in the favor of Serb hegemony over Yugoslavia.

== Economy ==
=== Farming ===
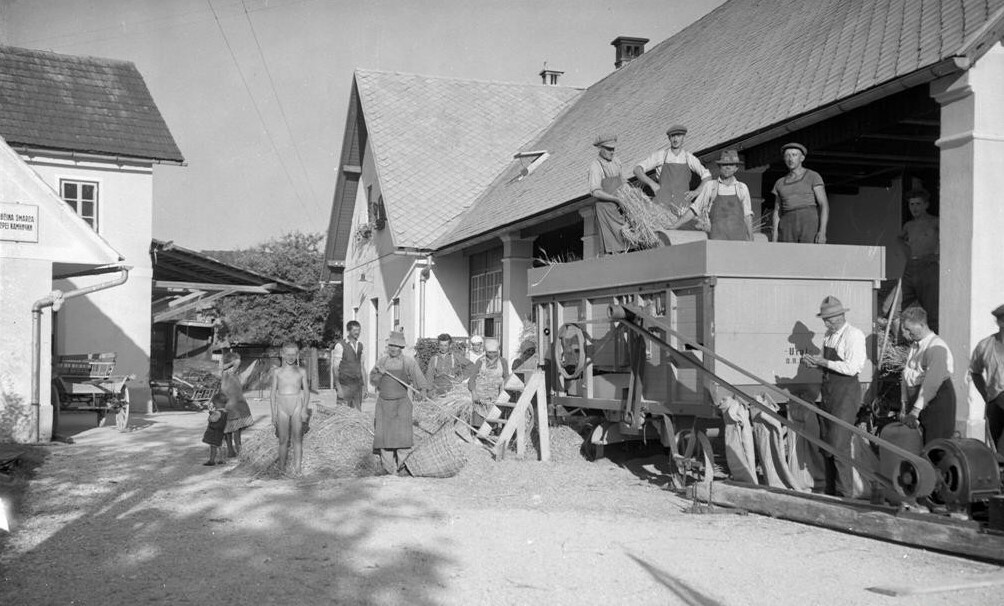
Slovene farmers threshing wheat (1930s)

Three-quarters of the Yugoslav workforce was engaged in agriculture. A few commercial farmers existed, but most were subsistence peasants. Those in the south were especially poor, living in a hilly, infertile region. No large estates existed except in the north, and most of those were owned by non-Slavs. Indeed, one of the first actions undertaken by the new Yugoslav state in 1919 was to break up the estates and dispose of non-Slavic, and in particular Hungarian landowners. Nearly 40% of the rural population was surplus (i.e., excess people not needed to maintain current production levels), and despite a warm climate, Yugoslavia was also relatively dry. Internal communications were poor, damage from World War I had been extensive, and with few exceptions agriculture was devoid of machinery or other modern farming technologies.

The 1931 census revealed that 34% of Yugoslav peasants owned less than five acres of land; another 34% owned between five-twelve acres of land; 29% owned fifty acres; and 3% owned more than fifty acres. The interwar era saw the emergence of a class known as the worker-peasants who engaged in seasonal work, working part of the year on the farm and another part in industry, usually mining. About 90% of Yugoslav farmers owned their own land, which explained why so many were unwilling to break with their rural lifestyle completely. More than half of industrial workers belonged to the worker-peasant category. In 1931, the Social Ministry reported: that in Yugoslavia there is a constant stream of laborers coming and going from agriculture to industry and vice versa. What has developed is a new class of workers-we call them industrialized peasants-who are regularly employed industry without having broken their ties to agriculture". The Great Depression hurt Yugoslavia very badly with most people living a lower standard of living in 1940 than they had in 1920. Between 1925-1933, the income of peasants fell by two-thirds.

=== Manufacturing ===
Manufacturing was limited to Belgrade and the other major population centers, and consisted mainly of small, comparatively primitive facilities that produced strictly for the domestic market. The commercial potential of Yugoslavia's Adriatic ports went to waste because the nation lacked the capital or technical knowledge to operate a shipping industry. On the other hand, the mining industry was well developed due to the nation's abundance of mineral resources, but since it was primarily owned and operated by foreigners, most production was exported. Yugoslavia was the third least industrialized nation in Eastern Europe after Bulgaria and Albania.

Yugoslavia was rich in deposits of coal, iron, copper, gold, silver, lead, zinc, chrome, manganese and bauxite, and mining was one of the most important industries in the kingdom. The backwardness of Yugoslavia prevented the mining industry from becoming the basis of an industrial society. The lack of electricity was a major problem. In 1934, the estimated per capita electricity consumption was approximately 90 kilowatt-hours per year in Belgrade, compared to 253 kWh/year in Budapest and 367 kWh/year in Paris. The lack of a manufacturing basis led to the situation where raw materials were exported from Yugoslavia to more developed nations, usually Britain, France or Germany, and Yugoslavs had to buy the products from those nations made with their raw materials. Despite these limitations, industry did begin to grow in Yugoslavia with 2,193 factories being opened between 1919-1938. The majority of the factories were opened in Slovenia, which had 47% of the factories, followed by Croatia at 37% and Serbia at 24%. The least industrialized regions were Kosovo and Macedonia, which 14% of the factories that were opened.

=== Debt ===
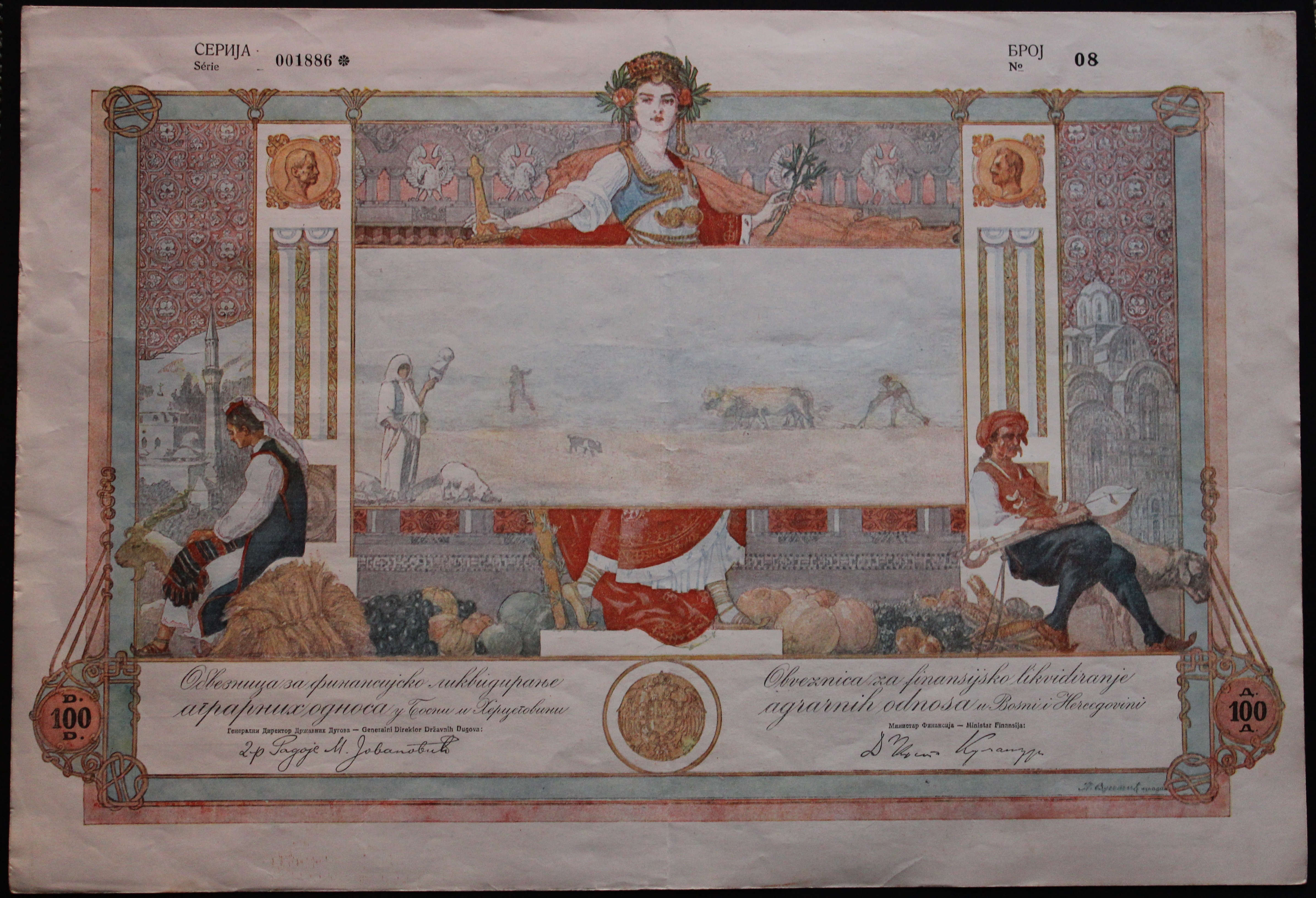
Bond of the Kingdom of Serbs, Croats and Slovenes for the liquidation of the agro-debts from Bosnia and Herzegovina, issued 18 June 1921

Yugoslavia was typical of Eastern European nations in that it borrowed large sums of money from the West during the 1920s. When the Great Depression began in 1929, the Western lenders called in their debts, which could not be paid back. Some of the money was lost to graft, although most was used by farmers to improve production and export potential. Agricultural exports, however, were always an unstable prospect as their export earnings were heavily reliant on volatile world market prices. The Great Depression caused the market for them to collapse as global demand contracted heavily and the situation for export-oriented farmers further deteriorated when nations everywhere started to erect trade barriers. Italy was a major trading partner of Yugoslavia in the initial years after World War I, but ties fell off after Benito Mussolini came to power in 1922. In the grim economic situation of the 1930s, Yugoslavia followed the lead of its neighbors in allowing itself to become a dependent of Nazi Germany.

=== Education ===
Although Yugoslavia had enacted a compulsory public education policy, it was inaccessible to many peasants in the countryside. Official literacy figures for the population stood at 50%, but it varied widely throughout the country. Less than 10% of Slovenes were illiterate, whereas over 80% of Macedonians and Bosnians could not read or write. Approximately 10% of initial elementary school students went on to attend higher forms of education, at one of the country's three universities in Belgrade, Ljubljana, and Zagreb.

== Political history ==
=== Early politics ===
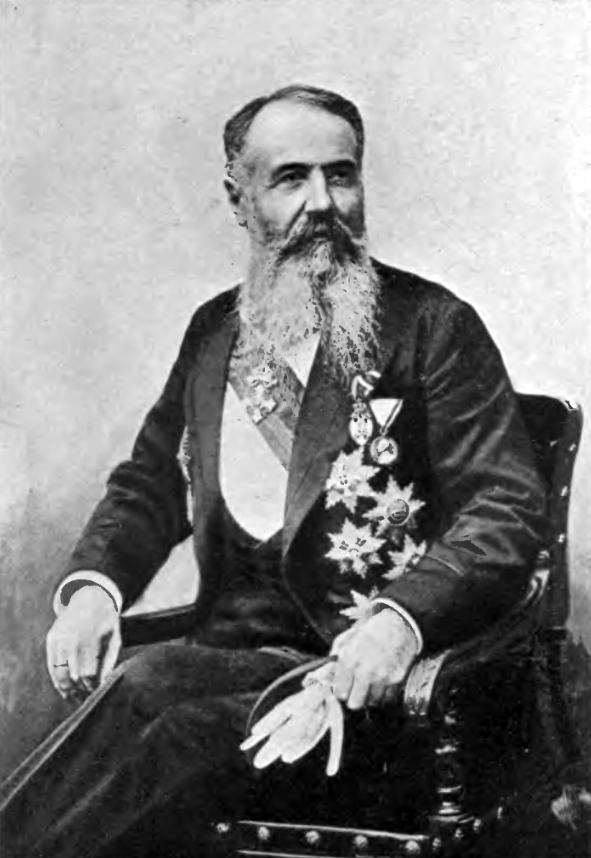
Between 1918 and 1926, Nikola Pašić held the position of Prime Minister of Yugoslavia three times.

Immediately after 1 December proclamation, negotiations between the National Council of Slovenes, Croats and Serbs and the Serbian government resulted in agreement over the new government which was to be headed by Nikola Pašić. However, when this agreement was submitted to the approval of the regent, Alexander Karađorđević, it was rejected, producing the new state's first governmental crisis. Many regarded this rejection as a violation of parliamentary principles, but the matter was resolved when the regent suggested replacing Pašić with Stojan Protić, a leading member of Pašić's People's Radical Party.The National Council and the Serbian government agreed and the new government came into existence on 20 December 1918.

In this period before the election of the Constituent Assembly, a Provisional Representation served as a parliament which was formed by delegates from the various elected bodies that had existed before the creation of the state. A realignment of parties combining several members of the Serbian opposition with political parties from the former Austria-Hungary led to the creation of a new party, The Democratic Party, that dominated the Provisional Representation and the government.

Because the Democratic Party led by Ljubomir Davidović pushed a highly centralized agenda a number of Croatian delegates moved into opposition. However, the radicals themselves were not happy that they had only three ministers to the Democratic Party's 11 and, on 16 August 1919, Protić handed in his resignation. Davidović then formed a coalition with the Social Democrats. This government had a majority, but the quorum of the Provisional Representation was half plus one vote. The opposition then began to boycott the parliament. As the government could never guarantee that all of its supporters would turn up, it became impossible to hold a quorate meeting of the parliament. Davidović soon resigned, but as no one else could form a government he again became prime minister. As the opposition continued their boycott, the government decided it had no alternative but to rule by decree. This was denounced by the opposition who began to style themselves as the Parliamentary Community. Davidović realized that the situation was untenable and asked the King to hold immediate elections for the Constituent Assembly. When the King refused, he felt he had no alternative but to resign.

The Parliamentary Community now formed a government led by Stojan Protić committed to the restoration of parliamentary norms and mitigating the centralization of the previous government. Their opposition to the former governments program of radical land reform also united them. As several small groups and individuals switched sides, Protić now even had a small majority. However, the Democratic Party and the Social Democrats now boycotted parliament and Protić was unable to muster a quorum. Hence the Parliamentary Community, now in government, resorted to rule by decree.

For the Parliamentary Community to thus violate the basic principle around which they had formed put them in an extremely difficult position. In April 1920, widespread worker unrest and a railway strike broke out. According to Gligorijević, this put pressure on the two main parties to settle their differences. After successful negotiations, Protić resigned to make way for a new government led by the neutral figure of Milenko Vesnić. The Social Democrats did not follow the Democratic Party, their former allies, into government because they were opposed to the anti-communist measures to which the new government was committed.

The controversies that had divided the parties earlier were still very much live issues. The Democratic Party continued to push its agenda of centralization and still insisted on the need for radical land reform. A disagreement over electoral law finally led the Democratic Party to vote against the government in Parliament and the government was defeated. Though this meeting had not been quorate, Vesnić used this as a pretext to resign. His resignation had the intended effect: the Radical Party agreed to accept the need for centralization, and the Democratic Party agreed to drop its insistence on land reform. Vesnić again headed the new government. The Croatian Union and the Slovene People's Party were however not happy with the Radicals' acceptance of centralization. Neither was Stojan Protić, and he withdrew from the government on this issue.

In September 1920 a peasant revolt broke out in Croatia, the immediate cause of which was the branding of the peasants' cattle. The Croatian Union blamed the centralizing policies of the government and of minister Svetozar Pribićević in particular.

=== Constituent assembly to dictatorship ===
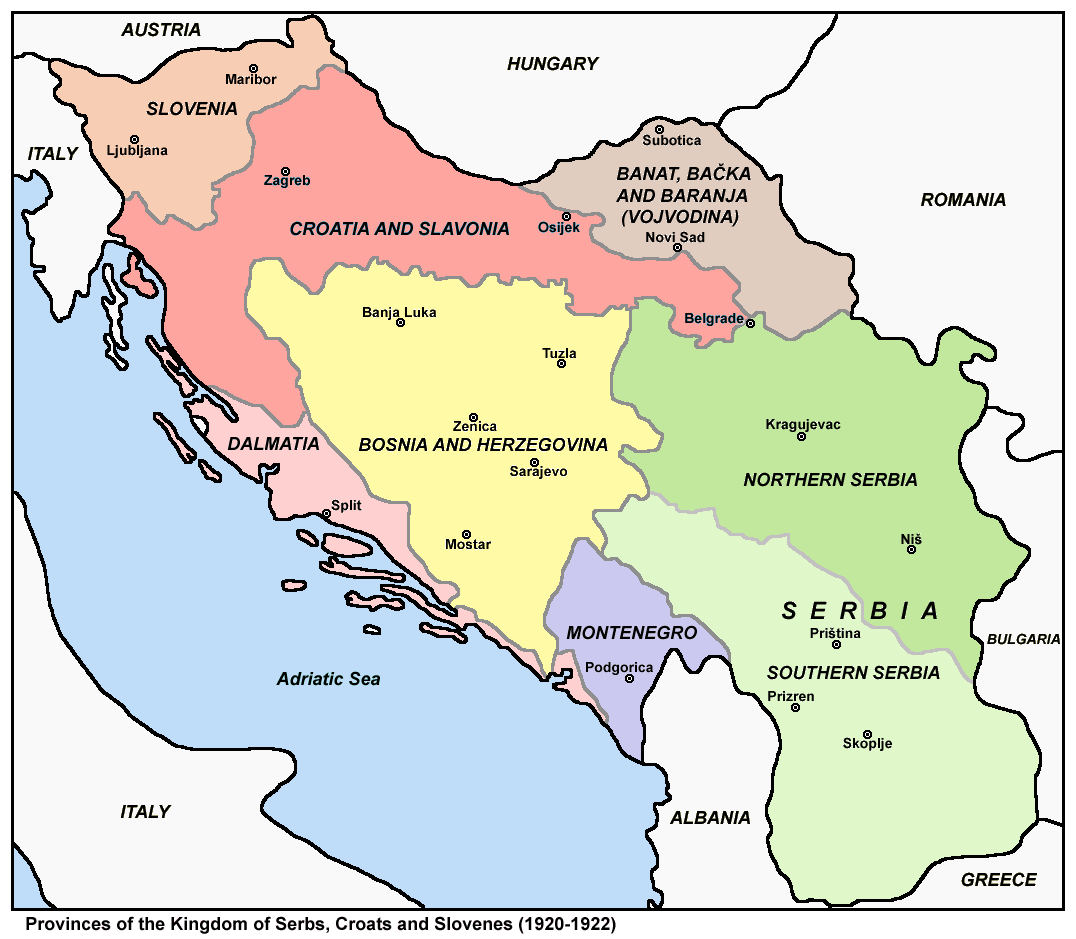
Provinces of the Kingdom in 1920–1922

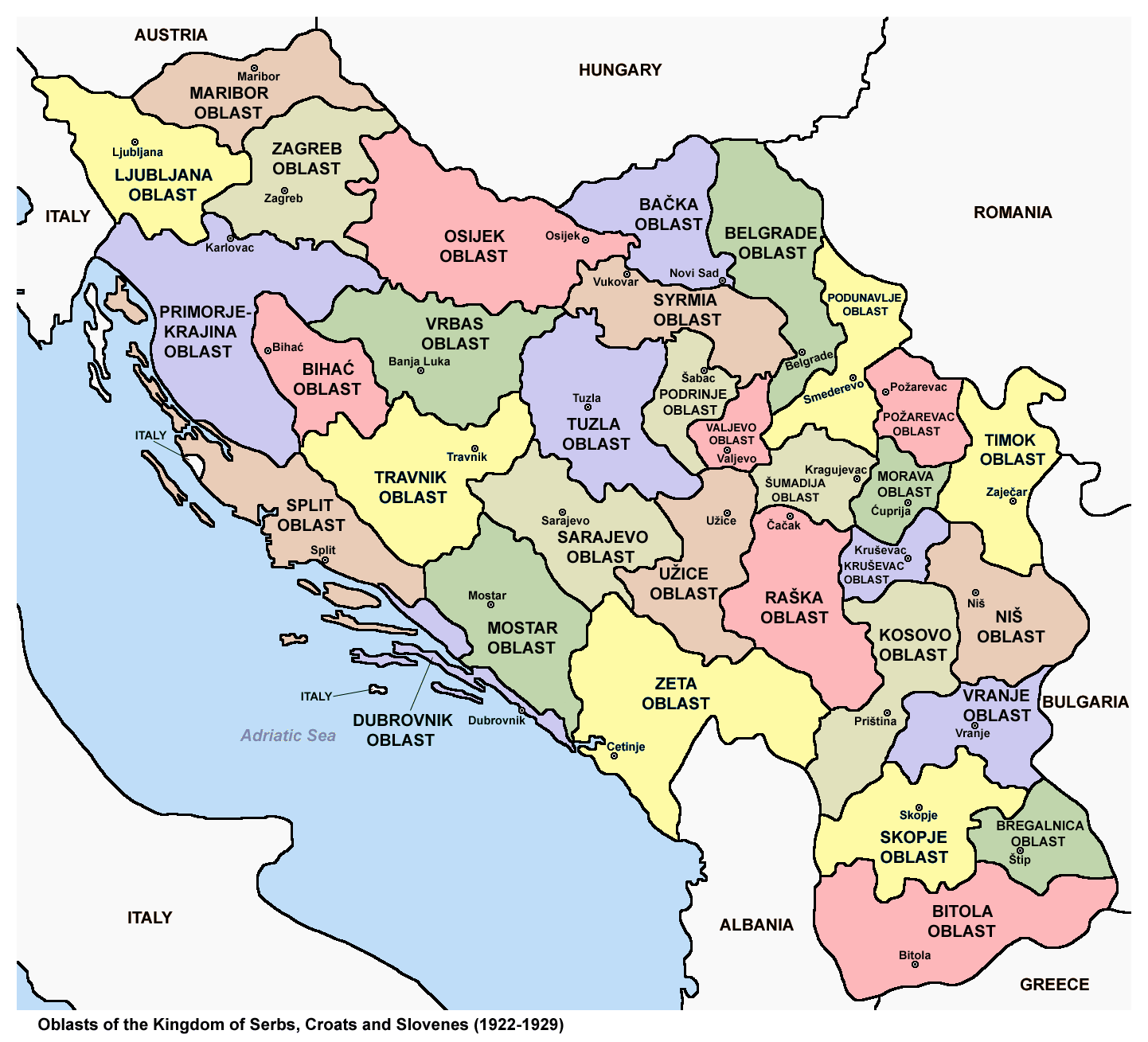
Oblasts of the Kingdom of Serbs, Croats and Slovenes

One of the few laws successfully passed by the Provisional Representation was the electoral law for the constituent assembly. During the negotiations that preceded the foundation of the new state, it had been agreed that voting would be secret and based on universal suffrage. It had not occurred to them that universal might include women until the beginning of a movement for women's suffrage appeared with the creation of the new state. The Social Democrats and the Slovenian People's Party supported women's suffrage but the Radicals opposed it. The Democratic Party was open to the idea but not committed enough to make an issue of it so the proposal fell. Proportional Representation was accepted in principle but the system chosen (d'Hondt with very small constituencies) favored large parties and parties with strong regional support.

The election was held on 28 November 1920. When the votes were counted the Democratic Party had won the most seats, more than the Radicals – but only just. For a party that had been so dominant in the Provisional Representation, that amounted to a defeat. Further it had done rather badly in all former Austria-Hungarian areas. That undercut the party's belief that its centralization policy represented the will of the Yugoslav people as a whole. The Radicals had done no better in that region but this presented them far less of a problem because they had campaigned openly as a Serbian party.

The most dramatic gains had been made by the two anti-system parties: the Croatian Republican Peasant Party (HRSS) and the Communist Party of Yugoslavia (KPJ). The leadership of the HRSS had been released from prison only as the election campaign began to get underway. According to Gligorijević, this had helped them more than active campaigning. The other gainers were the communists, who had done especially well in the wider Macedonia region, Montenegro, and in the larger cities elsewhere.

The Croatian Union party, that had in a timid way tried to express the discontent that the Croatian Republican Peasant Party mobilized, had been too tainted by their participation in government, and was all but eliminated. The remainder of the seats were taken up by smaller parties that were at best skeptical of the centralizing platform of the Democratic Party.

The results left Nikola Pašić in a very strong position as the Democrats had no choice but to ally with the Radicals if they wanted to get their concept of a centralized Yugoslavia through. Pašić was always careful to keep open the option of a deal with the Croatian opposition.

The Croatian Republican Peasant Party refused to swear allegiance to the King on the grounds that this presumed that Yugoslavia would be a monarchy, something that it contended only the Constituent Assembly could decide. The party was unable to take its seats. Most of the opposition, though initially taking their seats, declared boycotts as time passed. With the boycotts, there were few formal votes against.

The electoral success of the communists and the large-scale worker strikes and protests they had instigated led to the government to enact the Obznana on 29 December 1920, a decree which all but banned them.

The Constitutional Assembly decided to override the 1918 agreement between the State of Slovenes, Croats and Serbs and the Kingdom of Serbia, which had stated that a 66% majority that 50% plus one vote would be needed to pass, irrespective of how many voted against.

The Democrats and the Radicals were still not quite strong enough to get the constitution through on their own, and they made an alliance with the Yugoslav Muslim Organization (JMO). This Muslim party sought and got concessions over the preservation of Bosnia in its borders and how the land reform would affect Muslim landowners in Bosnia. Even with the JMO votes, last minute concessions to Džemijet, another group of Muslims from Macedonia and Kosovo, were necessary to get the vote to pass.

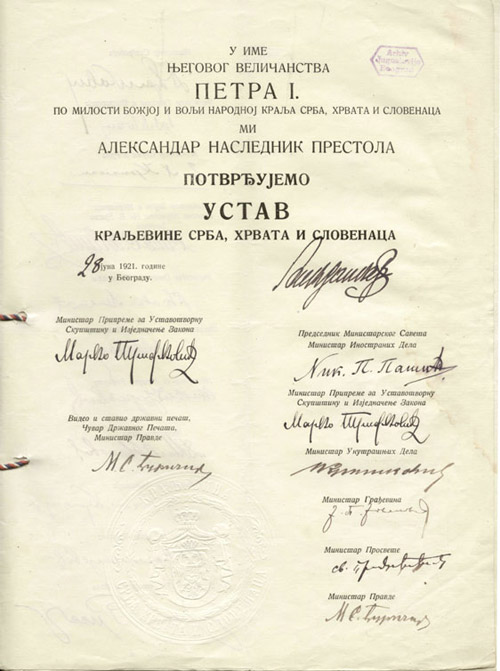
The Vidovdan Constitution

On 28 June 1921, the Vidovdan Constitution was passed, establishing a unitary monarchy. The pre–World War I traditional regions were abolished and 33 new administrative oblasts (provinces) ruled from the center were instituted.

In the immediate aftermath, two radical factions of the communists attempted assassinations of government officials. The authorities responded with the early August Law on the Protection of the State, which banned the CPY completely. The same law would later be used to ban the HRSS.

King Peter I died on 16 August 1921, and the prince-regent succeeded to the throne as King Alexander I. He was later known as "Alexander the Unifier".

Ljubomir Davidović of the Democrats began to have doubts about the wisdom of his party's commitment to centralization and opened up negotiations with the opposition. This threatened to provoke a split in his party as his action was opposed by Svetozar Pribićević. It also gave Pašić a pretext to end the coalition. At first the King gave Pašić a mandate to form a coalition with Pribićević's Democrats. However, Pašić offered Pribićević too little for there to be much chance that Pribićević would agree. A purely Radical government was formed with a mandate to hold elections. The Radicals made gains at the expense of the Democrats but elsewhere there were gains by Radić's Peasant's Party.

Serb politicians around Radic regarded Serbia as the standard bearer of Yugoslav unity, as the state of Piedmont had been for Italy, or Prussia for the German Empire; a kind of "Greater Serbia". Over the following years, Croatian resistance against a Serbo-centric policy increased.

In the early 1920s, the Yugoslav government of prime minister Nikola Pašić used police pressure over voters and ethnic minorities, confiscation of opposition pamphlets and other measure to rig elections. This was ineffective against the Croatian Peasant Party (formerly the Croatian Republican Peasant Party), whose members continued to win election to the Yugoslav parliament in large numbers, but did harm the Radicals' main Serbian rivals, the Democrats.

Stjepan Radić, the head of the Croatian Peasant Party, was imprisoned many times for political reasons. He was released in 1925 and returned to parliament.

In the spring of 1928, Radić and Svetozar Pribićević waged a bitter parliamentary battle against the ratification of the Nettuno Convention with Italy. In this they mobilised nationalist opposition in Serbia but provoked a violent reaction from the governing majority including death threats. On 20 June 1928, a member of the government majority, the Serb deputy Puniša Račić, shot five members of the Croatian Peasant Party, including their leader Stjepan Radić, after Radić refused to apologize for earlier offense in which he accused Račić of stealing from civilian population. Two died on the floor of the Assembly while the life of Radić hung in the balance.

The opposition now completely withdrew from parliament, declaring that they would not return to a parliament in which several of their representatives had been killed, and insisting on new elections. On 1 August, at a meeting in Zagreb, they renounced 1 December Declaration of 1920. They demanded that the negotiations for unification should begin from scratch. On 8 August Stjepan Radić died.

=== 6 January dictatorship ===
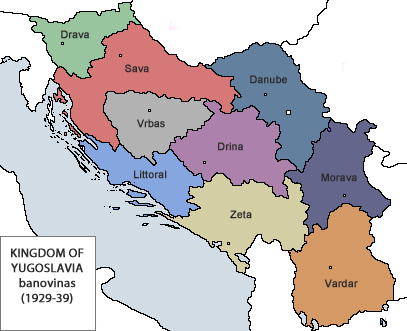
In 1929, the Kingdom of Yugoslavia was subdivided into nine banovinas. This became eight in 1939, when two were merged to form the Banovina of Croatia.

On 6 January 1929, using as a pretext the political crisis triggered by the shooting, King Alexander abolished the Constitution, prorogued the Parliament and introduced a personal dictatorship (known as the "January 6 Dictatorship", Šestosiječanjska diktatura, Šestojanuarska diktatura) with the aim of establishing the Yugoslav ideology and single Yugoslav nation.

He changed the official name of the country to "Kingdom of Yugoslavia" on 3 October 1929. He also changed the internal divisions from the 33 oblasts to nine new banovinas on 3 October. This decision was made following a proposal by the British ambassador to better decentralize the country, modeled on Czechoslovakia. A Court for the Protection of the State was soon established to act as the new regime's tool for putting down any dissent. Opposition politicians Vladko Maček and Svetozar Pribićević were arrested under charges by the court. Pribićević later went into exile, whereas over the course of the 1930s Maček would become the leader of the entire opposition bloc.

Immediately after the dictatorship was proclaimed, Croatian deputy Ante Pavelić left for exile from the country. The following years Pavelić worked to establish a revolutionary organization, the Ustaše, allied with the Internal Macedonian Revolutionary Organization (IMRO) against the state.

In 1931, Alexander decreed a new Constitution which made executive power the gift of the King. Elections were to be by universal male suffrage. The provision for a secret ballot was dropped, and pressure on public employees to vote for the governing party was to be a feature of all elections held under Alexander's constitution. Further, half the upper house was directly appointed by the King, and legislation could become law with the approval of one of the houses alone if also approved by the King.

That same year, Croatian historian and anti-Yugoslavist intellectual Milan Šufflay was assassinated in Zagreb. As a response, Albert Einstein and Heinrich Mann sent an appeal to the International League of Human Rights in Paris condemning the murder, accusing the Yugoslav government. The letter states of a "horrible brutality which is being practiced upon the Croatian People". The appeal was addressed to the Paris-based Ligue des droits de l'homme (Human Rights League). In their letter Einstein and Mann held the Yugoslav King Alexander explicitly responsible for these circumstances.

Croat opposition to the new régime was strong and, in late 1932, the Croatian Peasant Party issued the Zagreb Manifesto which sought an end to Serb hegemony and dictatorship. The government reacted by imprisoning many political opponents including the new Croatian Peasant Party leader Vladko Maček. Despite these measures, opposition to the dictatorship continued, with Croats calling for a solution to what was called the "Croatian question".

On 9 October 1934, the king was assassinated in Marseille, France, by Bulgarian Veličko Kerin (also known by his revolutionary pseudonym Vlado Chernozemski), an activist of IMRO, in a conspiracy with Yugoslav exiles and radical members of banned political parties in cooperation with the Croatian extreme nationalist Ustaše organisation.

=== Yugoslav regency ===
In 1939, the Banovina of Croatia was founded, aimed at solving the "Croatian question". It was formed from the Sava Banovina and Littoral Banovina, with small parts ceded from the Drina, Zeta, and Danube banovinas.

Because Alexander's eldest son, Peter II, was a minor, a regency council of three, specified in Alexander's will, took over the new king's royal powers and duties. The council was dominated by the 11-year-old king's first cousin once removed Prince Paul.

Prince Paul decided to appoint well-known economist Milan Stojadinović as prime minister in 1935. His solution to solving the economic problems left over from the Great Depression was to make trade deals and get closer to Fascist Italy and Nazi Germany. The JRZ had majority support from Slovenes, Bosniaks, and Serbs. The only part missing was the support from Croats. This is why Milan Stojadinović called the JRZ regime a "Three-Legged Chair", Stojadinović wrote in his memoirs: "I called our party the three-legged chair, on which it was possible to sit when necessary, although a chair with four legs is far more stable" - the fourth leg being the Croats, whose support was mostly behind the HSS. Prince Paul did not like this at first, but let him continue as long as it fixed the economy. Paul was concerned with rising tensions in Europe, especially with the Anschluss and the Munich Agreement Therefore, Paul ousted Milan Stojadinović replacing him with Dragiša Cvetković for being a Germanophile.

In the late 1930s, internal tensions continued to increase with Serbs and Croats seeking to establish ethnic federal subdivisions. Serbs wanted Vardar Banovina (later known within Yugoslavia as Vardar Macedonia), Vojvodina, Montenegro united with the Serb lands, and Croatia wanted Dalmatia and some of Vojvodina. Both sides claimed territory in present-day Bosnia and Herzegovina populated also by Bosnian Muslims. The expansion of Nazi Germany in 1938 gave new momentum to efforts to solve these problems and, in 1939, Prince Paul appointed Dragiša Cvetković as prime minister, with the goal of reaching an agreement with the Croatian opposition. Accordingly, on 26 August 1939, Vladko Maček became vice premier of Yugoslavia and an autonomous Banovina of Croatia was established with its own parliament.

These changes satisfied neither Serbs, who were concerned with the status of the Serb minority in the new Banovina of Croatia and who wanted more of Bosnia and Herzegovina as Serbian territory, nor the Croatian nationalist Ustaše, who were also angered by any settlement short of full independence for a Greater Croatia including all of Bosnia and Herzegovina.

=== Downfall ===
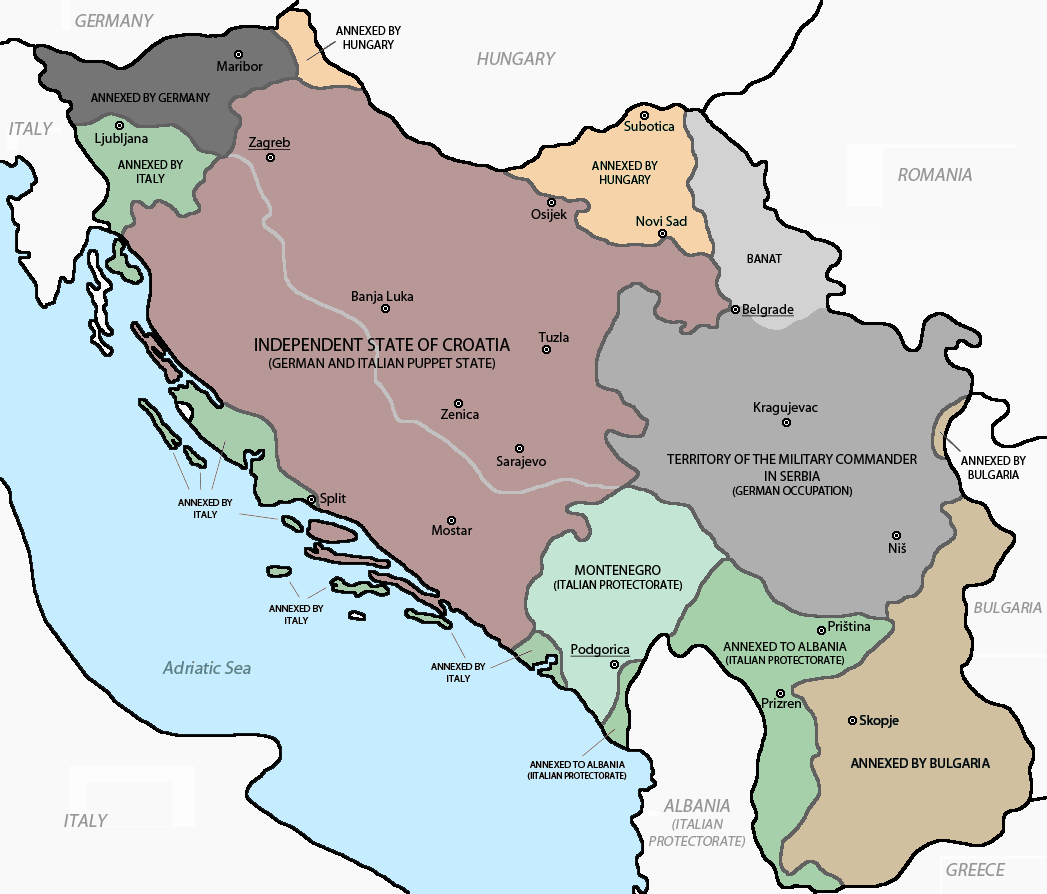
Occupation and partition of Yugoslavia, 1941–1943

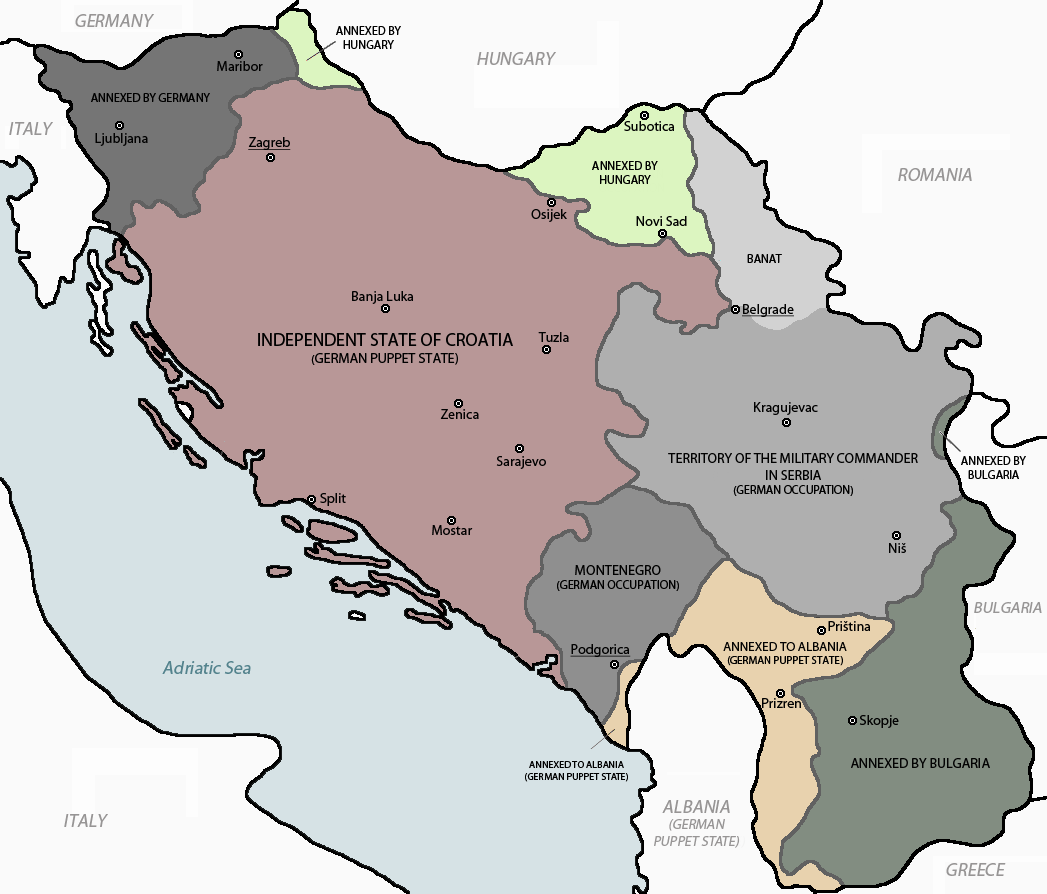
Occupation and partition of Yugoslavia, 1943–1944

Fearing an invasion by the Axis powers, Yugoslavia signed the Tripartite Pact on 25 March 1941, pledging cooperation with the Axis. Massive anti-Axis demonstrations followed in Belgrade.

On 27 March, the regime of Prince Paul was overthrown by a military coup d'état with British support. The 17-year-old Peter II was declared to be of age and placed in power. General Dušan Simović became his Prime Minister. Yugoslavia withdrew its support for the Axis de facto without formally renouncing the Tripartite Pact. Although the new rulers opposed Nazi Germany, they also feared that if Germany attacked Yugoslavia, the United Kingdom was not in any real position to help. Regardless of this, on 6 April 1941, the Axis powers launched the invasion of Yugoslavia and quickly conquered it. The royal family, including Prince Paul, escaped abroad and were kept under house arrest in British Kenya.

Yugoslavia was soon divided by the Axis into several entities. Germany, Italy, Hungary, and Bulgaria annexed some border areas outright. A Greater Germany was expanded to include most of Slovenia. Italy added the Governorship of Dalmatia, part of Macedonia and Kosovo, Montenegro, southerly part of Croatia, and more than a third of western Slovenia to the Italian Empire. An expanded Croatia was recognized by the Axis as the Independent State of Croatia (Nezavisna Država Hrvatska, NDH). On paper, the NDH was a kingdom and the 4th Duke of Aosta was crowned as King Tomislav II of Croatia, but in reality the King was merely a figurehead and the real power was held by Poglavnik Ante Pavelić. The rump territory became a military administration of Germany run by military governors and a Serb civil government led by Milan Nedić. Nedić attempted to gain German recognition of Territory of Serbia as a successor state to Yugoslavia and claimed King Peter II as Serbia's monarch. Hungary occupied several northern regions.

Following the July 1943 fall of the Fascist regime in Italy, Tomislav II abdicated from his Croatian throne and Pavelić assumed direct control over the NDH, annexing the Italian Governorate of Dalmatia in the process. After the invasion of Italy by the Axis powers in September 1943, the Italian governorates in Montenegro, Kosovo, Macedonia and Slovenia were occupied by the Germans and placed under direct German control.

=== Exile of the king ===
King Peter II, who had escaped into exile, was still recognized as King of the whole state of Yugoslavia by the Allies. From 13 May 1941, the largely Serb guerilla force, Chetniks ("Yugoslav Army of the Fatherland", Jugoslovenska vojska u otadžbini, or JVUO) resisted the Axis occupation of Yugoslavia and supported Peter II. This resistance movement, which was both anti-German and anti-communist, was commanded by Royalist General Draža Mihailović. For a long time, the Chetniks were supported by the British, the United States, and the Yugoslav royal government in exile of King Peter II.

However, over the course of the war, effective power changed to the hands of Josip Broz Tito's Communist Partisans. In 1943, Tito proclaimed the creation of the Democratic Federative Yugoslavia (Demokratska federativna Jugoslavija). The Allies gradually recognized Tito's forces as the stronger opposition forces to the German occupation. They began to send most of their aid to Tito's Partisans, rather than to the Royalist Chetniks. On 16 June 1944, the Tito–Šubašić agreement was signed which merged the de facto and the de jure government of Yugoslavia.

In early 1945, after the Germans had been driven out, the Kingdom of Yugoslavia was formally restored, however real political power was held by Tito's Communist Partisans. On 29 November, King Peter II was deposed (and the monarchy abolished) by Yugoslavia's Communist Constituent Assembly while he was still in exile. On 2 December, the Communist authorities claimed the entire territory as part of the Federal People's Republic of Yugoslavia. The new Yugoslavia covered roughly the same territory as the Kingdom had, now a federal republic ruled by the Communist Party rather than a unitary monarchy.

== Foreign policy ==
=== Pro-Allied government ===
The Kingdom nourished a close relationship with the Allies of World War I. This was especially the case between 1920 and 1934 with Yugoslavia's traditional supporters of Britain and France.

==== Little Entente ====
From 1920, the Kingdom of Yugoslavia had formed the Little Entente with Czechoslovakia and Romania, with the support of France. The primary aim of the alliance was to prevent Hungary from regaining the territories it had lost after the First World War. The alliance lost its significance in 1937 when Yugoslavia and Romania refused to support Czechoslovakia, then threatened by Germany, in the event of military aggression.

==== Balkan alliances ====
In 1934, the Kingdom of Yugoslavia formed a Balkan Bloc with Greece, Romania, and Turkey that was intent on keeping balance on the Balkan peninsula. The alliance was formalized and entrenched on 9 February 1934 when it became the "Balkan Entente". In 1934, with the assassination of King Alexander I by Vlado Chernozemski in Marseille and the shifting of Yugoslav foreign policy, the alliance crumbled.

==== Tensions with Italy ====
The Kingdom of Italy had territorial ambitions against the Kingdom of Yugoslavia. Relations between Italy and the kingdom's predecessors, the Kingdom of Serbia and the State of Slovenes, Croats and Serbs became sour and hostile during World War I, as Italian and Yugoslav politicians were in dispute over the region of Dalmatia which Italy demanded as part of Italy. These hostile relations were demonstrated on 1 November 1918, when Italian forces sunk the recently captured Austro-Hungarian battleship SMS Viribus Unitis being used by the State of Slovenes, Croats and Serbs.

Italian Fascist dictator Benito Mussolini accepted the extreme Croatian nationalist Ustase movement of Ante Pavelić to reside in Italy and use training grounds in Italy to prepare for war with Yugoslavia. Hungary also permitted such Ustase training camps as well. Mussolini allowed Pavelić to reside in Rome.

===== Friendship agreement =====
In 1927, in response to the growing Italian expansionism, the royal government of Yugoslavia signed an agreement of friendship and cooperation with the United Kingdom and France.

=== 1935–1941 ===
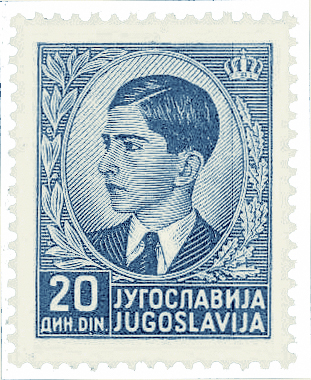
1939 Yugoslav postage stamp featuring King Peter II

Officially, the last words of King Alexander had been "Save Yugoslavia, and the friendship with France". His successors were well aware of the need to try and do the first, but the second, maintaining close ties with France, was increasingly difficult. There were several reasons for this. By the mid-1930s, France, internally divided, was increasingly unable to play an important role in Eastern Europe and support its allies, many of whom had suffered badly from the economic crisis of that period. By contrast, Germany was increasingly willing to get into barter agreements with the countries of south east Europe. In the process those countries felt it was against their interests to closely follow France. An additional motive to improve relations with Italy and Germany was Italy's support of the Ustase movement. As Maček intimated Italy would support Croatian secession from Yugoslavia, First Regent Prince Paul judged closer relations with Italy were inevitable. In an effort to rob the HSS from potential Italian support, a treaty of friendship was signed between the two countries in 1937. This diminished the Ustasa threat somewhat since Mussolini imprisoned some of their leaders and temporarily withdrew financial support. In 1938, Germany, annexing Austria, became a neighbour of Yugoslavia. The feeble reaction of France and Britain, later that year, during the Sudeten Crisis convinced Belgrade that a European war was inevitable and that it would be unwise to support France and Britain. Instead, Yugoslavia tried to stay aloof, this in spite of Paul's personal sympathies for Britain and Serbia's establishment's predilections for France. In the meantime, Germany and Italy tried to exploit Yugoslavia's domestic problems, and so did Maček. In the end, the regency agreed to the formation of the Banovina of Croatia in August 1939. This did not put an end to the pressures from Germany and Italy, and Yugoslavia's strategic position deteriorated by the day. It was increasingly dependent on the German market, about 90% of its exports went to Germany, and in April 1939 Italy invaded and annexed Albania. In October 1940 it attacked Greece, by when France had already been eliminated from the scene, leaving Britain as Yugoslavia's only potential ally – given that Belgrade had not recognized the Soviet Union. London however wanted to involve Yugoslavia in the war, which it rejected.

From late 1940, Adolf Hitler wanted Belgrade to unequivocally choose sides. Pressure intensified, culminating in the signing of the Tripartite Pact on 25 March 1941. Two days later, Prince Paul was deposed in a coup d'état and his nephew Peter II was proclaimed of age, but the new government, headed by General Simović, assured Germany it would adhere to the Pact. Hitler nonetheless ordered the invasion of Yugoslavia. On 6 April 1941, Belgrade was bombed; on 10 April, the Independent State of Croatia was proclaimed; and on 17 April, the weak Yugoslav Army capitulated.

=== 1941–1945 ===
After the invasion, the Yugoslav royal government went into exile and local Yugoslav forces rose up in resistance to the occupying Axis powers. Initially the monarchy preferred Draža Mihailović and his Serb-dominated Četnik resistance. However, in 1944, the Tito–Šubašić agreement recognised the Democratic Federal Yugoslavia as a provisional government, with the status of the monarchy to be decided at a later date. Three regents – Srđan Budisavljević, a Serb; Ante Mandić, a Croat; and Dušan Sernec, a Slovene – were sworn in at Belgrade on 3 March 1945. They appointed the new government, to be headed by Tito as prime minister and minister of war, with Šubašić as foreign minister, on 7 March.

On 29 November 1945, while still in exile, King Peter II was deposed by the constituent assembly. The Federal People's Republic of Yugoslavia was internationally recognized as Yugoslavia and Peter II became a pretender.

== Demographics ==
=== Ethnic groups ===
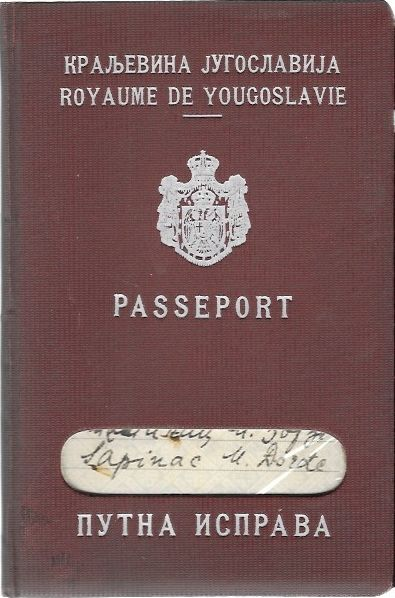
Passport of the Kingdom of Yugoslavia

The small middle class occupied the major population centers and almost everyone else were peasants engaged in subsistence agriculture. The largest ethnic group were Serbs followed by Croats and Slovenes, as three constitutive peoples of the Kingdom, while Montenegrins, Bosnian Muslims and Macedonians were not recognized as distinctive ethnic groups; further historical minority groups included Germans, Italians, Hungarians, Slovaks, Jews and Rusyns. Religion followed the same pattern with half the population following Orthodox Christianity, around 40% Roman Catholicism and most of the rest Sunni Islam. Beside "Serbo-Croato-Slovene" (which includes Macedonian, then recognized as a southern dialect of Serbian), the most widely spoken languages by number of speakers were Albanian, Italian, Hungarian, German, Slovak and Rusyn.

In a multiethnic, multireligious and multilinguistic society, ethnic tensions and regional interests commonly surfaced in both politics and daily life, especially between the two largest and most influential groups who monopolized all political power in the country, the Serbs and Croats. Other quarrels were those between Serbs and Macedonians, as the Yugoslav government had as its official position that the latter were ethnic Serbs from "Old Serbia" (Serbo-Croatian: Stara Srbija). In the early 20th century the international community viewed the Macedonians predominantly as regional variety of Bulgarians on linguistic basis and cultural similarities, but during the Paris Peace Conference of 1919, the Allies sanctioned the Serbian control of Vardar Macedonia and its view, that Macedonian Slavs were in fact Southern Serbs. Bulgarian politicians later interpreted the decision as punishment for it being a Central Power during World War I and as sanctioned Serbian irredentism.

Rights of the Muslim minority were never enshrined in law but concessions were made to accommodate for religious relativism. Some regions of the country were allowed to exist as enclaves of Islamic law.

Aside from Vlachs, the Yugoslav government awarded no special treatment to non-Slavic ethnic minorities in terms of respect for their language, culture, or political autonomy.

Until 1929, Serbs, Croats and Slovenes were the constitutional nations, when they were merged into a single "Yugoslav" nationality. With the language of the country being institutionalized and mandatory, ethnic minorities were expected to gradually assimilate into the Yugoslav panethnic identity.

=== Persecution of Albanians ===
From the end of World War I to the beginning of World War II in Yugoslavia, ethnic Albanians in Yugoslavia were subject to persecution. The discrimination faced by the Albanians existed in the forms of deportations, mass killings, executions, imprisonment, etc. The Yugoslav authorities attempted to colonize Kosovo to change its ethnic character. There were a number of massacres that took place in Kosovo and Montenegro, some of which were reported by Sherman Miles to the United States Department of State in May 1919. During the interwar period, between 90,000 and 300,000 Albanians were deported from Yugoslavia.

== Lists of rulers ==
=== Kings ===
- Peter I (1 December 1918 – 16 August 1921; Prince regent Alexander ruled in the name of the King)
- Alexander I (16 August 1921 – 9 October 1934)
- Peter II (9 October 1934 – 29 November 1945; in exile from 13/14 April 1941)
  - Regency headed by Prince Paul (9 October 1934 – 27 March 1941)

=== Prime Ministers 1918–1941 ===
- Stojan Protić: 1918–1919
- Ljubomir Davidović: 1919–1920
- Stojan Protić: 1920
- Milenko Vesnić: 1920–1921
- Nikola Pašić: 1921–1924
- Ljubomir Davidović: 1924
- Nikola Pašić: 1924–1926
- Nikola Uzunović: 1926–1927
- Velimir Vukićević: 1927–1928
- Anton Korošec: 1928–1929
- Petar Živković: 1929–1932
- Vojislav Marinković: 1932
- Milan Srškić: 1932–1934
- Nikola Uzunović: 1934
- Bogoljub Jevtić: 1934–1935
- Milan Stojadinović: 1935–1939
- Dragiša Cvetković: 1939–1941
- Dušan Simović: 1941

=== Prime Ministers-in-exile 1941–1945 ===
- Dušan Simović: 1941–1942
- Slobodan Jovanović: 1942–1943
- Miloš Trifunović: 1943
- Božidar Purić: 1943–1944
- Ivan Šubašić: 1944–1945
- Josip Broz Tito: 1945

== Subdivisions ==
The subdivisions of the Kingdom of Yugoslavia existed successively in three different forms. From 1918 to 1922, the kingdom maintained the pre–World War I subdivisions of Yugoslavia's predecessor states. In 1922, the state was divided into thirty-three oblasts (provinces). In 1929, after the establishment of the January 6 Dictatorship, a new system of nine banovinas (regions) was implemented by royal decree. In 1939, as an accommodation to Yugoslav Croats in the Cvetković-Maček Agreement, a single Banovina of Croatia was formed from two of these banovinas (and from sections of others).

== Sport ==
The most popular sport in the Kingdom was association football. The Yugoslav Football Association was founded in Zagreb in 1919. It was based in Zagreb until the 6 January Dictatorship, when the association was moved to Belgrade. From 1923, a national championship was held annually. The national team played its first match at the 1920 Summer Olympics. It also participated in the inaugural FIFA World Cup, finishing fourth.

Other popular sports included water polo, which was dominated nationally by the Croatian side VK Jug.

The Kingdom participated at the Olympic Games from 1920 until 1936. During this time, the country won eight medals, all in gymnastics and six of these were won by Leon Štukelj, a Slovene who was the most nominated gymnast of that time.

== See also ==
- List of Finance Ministers of the Kingdom of Yugoslavia
- 1923 Kingdom of Serbs, Croats and Slovenes parliamentary election
- Republic of Prekmurje
- Slovene March (Kingdom of Hungary)

Region	until 1918	1918– 1929	1929– 1945	1941– 1945	1945– 1946	1946– 1963	1963– 1992	1992– 2003	2003– 2006	2006– 2008	since 2008
Slovenia	Part of Austria-Hungary including the Bay of Kotor See also: Kingdom of Croatia-Slavonia (1868–1918) Kingdom of Dalmatia (1815–1918) Condominium of Bosnia and Herzegovina (1878–1918)	State of Slovenes, Croats and Serbs (1918) Kingdom of Serbs, Croats and Slovenes (1918–1929) Kingdom of Yugoslavia (1929–1943) See also: Republic of Prekmurje (1919) Banat, Bačka and Baranja (1918–1919) Free State of Fiume (1920–1924) (1924–1945) Italian province of Zadar (1920–1947)		Annexed by Italy, Germany, and Hungary^{a}	Democratic Federal Yugoslavia (1943–1945) Federal People's Republic of Yugoslavia (1945–1963) Socialist Federal Republic of Yugoslavia (1963–1992) Consisted of the Socialist Republics of: Slovenia (1945–1991); Croatia (1945–1991); Bosnia and Herzegovina (1945–1992) Serbia (1945–1992) (included the autonomous provinces of Vojvodina and Kosovo) Montenegro (1945–1992); Macedonia (1945–1991) See also: Free Territory of Trieste (1947–1954)^{h}			Republic of Slovenia; Ten-Day War			
Dalmatia	Part of Austria-Hungary including the Bay of Kotor See also: Kingdom of Croatia-Slavonia (1868–1918) Kingdom of Dalmatia (1815–1918) Condominium of Bosnia and Herzegovina (1878–1918)	State of Slovenes, Croats and Serbs (1918) Kingdom of Serbs, Croats and Slovenes (1918–1929) Kingdom of Yugoslavia (1929–1943) See also: Republic of Prekmurje (1919) Banat, Bačka and Baranja (1918–1919) Free State of Fiume (1920–1924) (1924–1945) Italian province of Zadar (1920–1947)		Independent State of Croatia (1941–1945) Puppet state of Germany. Parts annexed by Italy. Međimurje and Baranja annexed by Hungary.	Democratic Federal Yugoslavia (1943–1945) Federal People's Republic of Yugoslavia (1945–1963) Socialist Federal Republic of Yugoslavia (1963–1992) Consisted of the Socialist Republics of: Slovenia (1945–1991); Croatia (1945–1991); Bosnia and Herzegovina (1945–1992) Serbia (1945–1992) (included the autonomous provinces of Vojvodina and Kosovo) Montenegro (1945–1992); Macedonia (1945–1991) See also: Free Territory of Trieste (1947–1954)^{h}			Republic of Croatia^{b} Croatian War of Independence			
Slavonia	Part of Austria-Hungary including the Bay of Kotor See also: Kingdom of Croatia-Slavonia (1868–1918) Kingdom of Dalmatia (1815–1918) Condominium of Bosnia and Herzegovina (1878–1918)	State of Slovenes, Croats and Serbs (1918) Kingdom of Serbs, Croats and Slovenes (1918–1929) Kingdom of Yugoslavia (1929–1943) See also: Republic of Prekmurje (1919) Banat, Bačka and Baranja (1918–1919) Free State of Fiume (1920–1924) (1924–1945) Italian province of Zadar (1920–1947)		Independent State of Croatia (1941–1945) Puppet state of Germany. Parts annexed by Italy. Međimurje and Baranja annexed by Hungary.	Democratic Federal Yugoslavia (1943–1945) Federal People's Republic of Yugoslavia (1945–1963) Socialist Federal Republic of Yugoslavia (1963–1992) Consisted of the Socialist Republics of: Slovenia (1945–1991); Croatia (1945–1991); Bosnia and Herzegovina (1945–1992) Serbia (1945–1992) (included the autonomous provinces of Vojvodina and Kosovo) Montenegro (1945–1992); Macedonia (1945–1991) See also: Free Territory of Trieste (1947–1954)^{h}			Republic of Croatia^{b} Croatian War of Independence			
Croatia	Part of Austria-Hungary including the Bay of Kotor See also: Kingdom of Croatia-Slavonia (1868–1918) Kingdom of Dalmatia (1815–1918) Condominium of Bosnia and Herzegovina (1878–1918)	State of Slovenes, Croats and Serbs (1918) Kingdom of Serbs, Croats and Slovenes (1918–1929) Kingdom of Yugoslavia (1929–1943) See also: Republic of Prekmurje (1919) Banat, Bačka and Baranja (1918–1919) Free State of Fiume (1920–1924) (1924–1945) Italian province of Zadar (1920–1947)		Independent State of Croatia (1941–1945) Puppet state of Germany. Parts annexed by Italy. Međimurje and Baranja annexed by Hungary.	Democratic Federal Yugoslavia (1943–1945) Federal People's Republic of Yugoslavia (1945–1963) Socialist Federal Republic of Yugoslavia (1963–1992) Consisted of the Socialist Republics of: Slovenia (1945–1991); Croatia (1945–1991); Bosnia and Herzegovina (1945–1992) Serbia (1945–1992) (included the autonomous provinces of Vojvodina and Kosovo) Montenegro (1945–1992); Macedonia (1945–1991) See also: Free Territory of Trieste (1947–1954)^{h}			Republic of Croatia^{b} Croatian War of Independence			
Bosnia	Part of Austria-Hungary including the Bay of Kotor See also: Kingdom of Croatia-Slavonia (1868–1918) Kingdom of Dalmatia (1815–1918) Condominium of Bosnia and Herzegovina (1878–1918)	State of Slovenes, Croats and Serbs (1918) Kingdom of Serbs, Croats and Slovenes (1918–1929) Kingdom of Yugoslavia (1929–1943) See also: Republic of Prekmurje (1919) Banat, Bačka and Baranja (1918–1919) Free State of Fiume (1920–1924) (1924–1945) Italian province of Zadar (1920–1947)		Independent State of Croatia (1941–1945) Puppet state of Germany. Parts annexed by Italy. Međimurje and Baranja annexed by Hungary.	Democratic Federal Yugoslavia (1943–1945) Federal People's Republic of Yugoslavia (1945–1963) Socialist Federal Republic of Yugoslavia (1963–1992) Consisted of the Socialist Republics of: Slovenia (1945–1991); Croatia (1945–1991); Bosnia and Herzegovina (1945–1992) Serbia (1945–1992) (included the autonomous provinces of Vojvodina and Kosovo) Montenegro (1945–1992); Macedonia (1945–1991) See also: Free Territory of Trieste (1947–1954)^{h}			Bosnia and Herzegovina^{c} Bosnian War Consists of the Federation of Bosnia and Herzegovina (since 1995), Republika Srpska (since 1995), and Brčko District (since 2000).			
Herzegovina	Part of Austria-Hungary including the Bay of Kotor See also: Kingdom of Croatia-Slavonia (1868–1918) Kingdom of Dalmatia (1815–1918) Condominium of Bosnia and Herzegovina (1878–1918)	State of Slovenes, Croats and Serbs (1918) Kingdom of Serbs, Croats and Slovenes (1918–1929) Kingdom of Yugoslavia (1929–1943) See also: Republic of Prekmurje (1919) Banat, Bačka and Baranja (1918–1919) Free State of Fiume (1920–1924) (1924–1945) Italian province of Zadar (1920–1947)		Independent State of Croatia (1941–1945) Puppet state of Germany. Parts annexed by Italy. Međimurje and Baranja annexed by Hungary.	Democratic Federal Yugoslavia (1943–1945) Federal People's Republic of Yugoslavia (1945–1963) Socialist Federal Republic of Yugoslavia (1963–1992) Consisted of the Socialist Republics of: Slovenia (1945–1991); Croatia (1945–1991); Bosnia and Herzegovina (1945–1992) Serbia (1945–1992) (included the autonomous provinces of Vojvodina and Kosovo) Montenegro (1945–1992); Macedonia (1945–1991) See also: Free Territory of Trieste (1947–1954)^{h}			Bosnia and Herzegovina^{c} Bosnian War Consists of the Federation of Bosnia and Herzegovina (since 1995), Republika Srpska (since 1995), and Brčko District (since 2000).			
Vojvodina	Part of the Délvidék region of Hungary	State of Slovenes, Croats and Serbs (1918) Kingdom of Serbs, Croats and Slovenes (1918–1929) Kingdom of Yugoslavia (1929–1943) See also: Republic of Prekmurje (1919) Banat, Bačka and Baranja (1918–1919) Free State of Fiume (1920–1924) (1924–1945) Italian province of Zadar (1920–1947)		Autonomous Banat^{d} (part of the German; Territory of the Military Commander in Serbia)	Democratic Federal Yugoslavia (1943–1945) Federal People's Republic of Yugoslavia (1945–1963) Socialist Federal Republic of Yugoslavia (1963–1992) Consisted of the Socialist Republics of: Slovenia (1945–1991); Croatia (1945–1991); Bosnia and Herzegovina (1945–1992) Serbia (1945–1992) (included the autonomous provinces of Vojvodina and Kosovo) Montenegro (1945–1992); Macedonia (1945–1991) See also: Free Territory of Trieste (1947–1954)^{h}			Federal Republic of Yugoslavia Consisted of the Republic of Serbia (1992–2006) and Republic of Montenegro (1992–2006) Included Kosovo and Metohija, under UN administration, without control since 1999	State Union of Serbia and Montenegro Included Kosovo, under UN administration	Republic of Serbia Included the autonomous provinces of Vojvodina and Kosovo and Metohija under UN administration	Republic of Serbia Includes the autonomous province of Vojvodina; Kosovo claim
Central Serbia	Kingdom of Serbia (1882–1918)	State of Slovenes, Croats and Serbs (1918) Kingdom of Serbs, Croats and Slovenes (1918–1929) Kingdom of Yugoslavia (1929–1943) See also: Republic of Prekmurje (1919) Banat, Bačka and Baranja (1918–1919) Free State of Fiume (1920–1924) (1924–1945) Italian province of Zadar (1920–1947)		Territory of the Military Commander in Serbia (1941–1944) ^{e}	Democratic Federal Yugoslavia (1943–1945) Federal People's Republic of Yugoslavia (1945–1963) Socialist Federal Republic of Yugoslavia (1963–1992) Consisted of the Socialist Republics of: Slovenia (1945–1991); Croatia (1945–1991); Bosnia and Herzegovina (1945–1992) Serbia (1945–1992) (included the autonomous provinces of Vojvodina and Kosovo) Montenegro (1945–1992); Macedonia (1945–1991) See also: Free Territory of Trieste (1947–1954)^{h}			Federal Republic of Yugoslavia Consisted of the Republic of Serbia (1992–2006) and Republic of Montenegro (1992–2006) Included Kosovo and Metohija, under UN administration, without control since 1999	State Union of Serbia and Montenegro Included Kosovo, under UN administration	Republic of Serbia Included the autonomous provinces of Vojvodina and Kosovo and Metohija under UN administration	Republic of Serbia Includes the autonomous province of Vojvodina; Kosovo claim
Kosovo	Part of the Kingdom of Serbia (1912–1918)	State of Slovenes, Croats and Serbs (1918) Kingdom of Serbs, Croats and Slovenes (1918–1929) Kingdom of Yugoslavia (1929–1943) See also: Republic of Prekmurje (1919) Banat, Bačka and Baranja (1918–1919) Free State of Fiume (1920–1924) (1924–1945) Italian province of Zadar (1920–1947)		Mostly annexed by Italian Albania (1941–1944) along with western Macedonia and south-eastern Montenegro	Democratic Federal Yugoslavia (1943–1945) Federal People's Republic of Yugoslavia (1945–1963) Socialist Federal Republic of Yugoslavia (1963–1992) Consisted of the Socialist Republics of: Slovenia (1945–1991); Croatia (1945–1991); Bosnia and Herzegovina (1945–1992) Serbia (1945–1992) (included the autonomous provinces of Vojvodina and Kosovo) Montenegro (1945–1992); Macedonia (1945–1991) See also: Free Territory of Trieste (1947–1954)^{h}			Federal Republic of Yugoslavia Consisted of the Republic of Serbia (1992–2006) and Republic of Montenegro (1992–2006) Included Kosovo and Metohija, under UN administration, without control since 1999	State Union of Serbia and Montenegro Included Kosovo, under UN administration	Republic of Serbia Included the autonomous provinces of Vojvodina and Kosovo and Metohija under UN administration	Republic of Kosovo
Metohija	Kingdom of Montenegro (1910–1918) Metohija controlled by Austria-Hungary 1915–1918	State of Slovenes, Croats and Serbs (1918) Kingdom of Serbs, Croats and Slovenes (1918–1929) Kingdom of Yugoslavia (1929–1943) See also: Republic of Prekmurje (1919) Banat, Bačka and Baranja (1918–1919) Free State of Fiume (1920–1924) (1924–1945) Italian province of Zadar (1920–1947)		Mostly annexed by Italian Albania (1941–1944) along with western Macedonia and south-eastern Montenegro	Democratic Federal Yugoslavia (1943–1945) Federal People's Republic of Yugoslavia (1945–1963) Socialist Federal Republic of Yugoslavia (1963–1992) Consisted of the Socialist Republics of: Slovenia (1945–1991); Croatia (1945–1991); Bosnia and Herzegovina (1945–1992) Serbia (1945–1992) (included the autonomous provinces of Vojvodina and Kosovo) Montenegro (1945–1992); Macedonia (1945–1991) See also: Free Territory of Trieste (1947–1954)^{h}			Federal Republic of Yugoslavia Consisted of the Republic of Serbia (1992–2006) and Republic of Montenegro (1992–2006) Included Kosovo and Metohija, under UN administration, without control since 1999	State Union of Serbia and Montenegro Included Kosovo, under UN administration	Republic of Serbia Included the autonomous provinces of Vojvodina and Kosovo and Metohija under UN administration	Republic of Kosovo
Montenegro and Brda	Kingdom of Montenegro (1910–1918) Metohija controlled by Austria-Hungary 1915–1918	State of Slovenes, Croats and Serbs (1918) Kingdom of Serbs, Croats and Slovenes (1918–1929) Kingdom of Yugoslavia (1929–1943) See also: Republic of Prekmurje (1919) Banat, Bačka and Baranja (1918–1919) Free State of Fiume (1920–1924) (1924–1945) Italian province of Zadar (1920–1947)		Protectorate of Montenegro^{f} (1941–1944)	Democratic Federal Yugoslavia (1943–1945) Federal People's Republic of Yugoslavia (1945–1963) Socialist Federal Republic of Yugoslavia (1963–1992) Consisted of the Socialist Republics of: Slovenia (1945–1991); Croatia (1945–1991); Bosnia and Herzegovina (1945–1992) Serbia (1945–1992) (included the autonomous provinces of Vojvodina and Kosovo) Montenegro (1945–1992); Macedonia (1945–1991) See also: Free Territory of Trieste (1947–1954)^{h}			Federal Republic of Yugoslavia Consisted of the Republic of Serbia (1992–2006) and Republic of Montenegro (1992–2006) Included Kosovo and Metohija, under UN administration, without control since 1999	State Union of Serbia and Montenegro Included Kosovo, under UN administration	Montenegro	
Vardar Macedonia	Part of the Kingdom of Serbia (1912–1918)	State of Slovenes, Croats and Serbs (1918) Kingdom of Serbs, Croats and Slovenes (1918–1929) Kingdom of Yugoslavia (1929–1943) See also: Republic of Prekmurje (1919) Banat, Bačka and Baranja (1918–1919) Free State of Fiume (1920–1924) (1924–1945) Italian province of Zadar (1920–1947)		Annexed by the Kingdom of Bulgaria (1941–1944)	Democratic Federal Yugoslavia (1943–1945) Federal People's Republic of Yugoslavia (1945–1963) Socialist Federal Republic of Yugoslavia (1963–1992) Consisted of the Socialist Republics of: Slovenia (1945–1991); Croatia (1945–1991); Bosnia and Herzegovina (1945–1992) Serbia (1945–1992) (included the autonomous provinces of Vojvodina and Kosovo) Montenegro (1945–1992); Macedonia (1945–1991) See also: Free Territory of Trieste (1947–1954)^{h}			Republic of North Macedonia^{g}			
^{a} Prekmurje annexed by Hungary.; ^{b} See also: SAO Kninska Krajina (1990) → SAO Krajina (1990–1991); and SAO Eastern Slavonia, Baranja and Western Syrmia (1990–1991), SAO Western Slavonia (1990–1991) and the Republic of Serbian Krajina (1990–1995), all replaced by the UN Transitional Administration for Eastern Slavonia, Baranja and Western Sirmium (1996–1998).; ^{c} See also: Republic of Bosnia and Herzegovina; Croatian Republic of Herzeg-Bosnia; and the Serbian Autonomous Oblasts (SAOs) of Bosanska Krajina, North-East Bosnia, Romanija and Herzegovina (1991–1992), which all combined to form the Serbian Republic of Bosnia and Herzegovina (1992–1995).; ^{d} Bačka was reannexed by Hungary (1941–1944), while Syrmia was annexed by the Independent State of Croatia (1941–1944).; ^{e} Including North Kosovo. See also: Republic of Užice.; ^{f} Annexed by Italy (1941–1943) and Germany (1943–1944). Smaller part annexed by the Independent State of Croatia (1941–1944).; ^{g} North Macedonia's official and constitutional name was the Republic of Macedonia until 2019. It was known in the United Nations as the former Yugoslav Republic of Macedonia because of a naming dispute with Greece.; ^{h} Free Territory was established in 1947. Its administration was divided into two areas (Zone A) and (Zone B). Free Territory was de facto taken over by Italy and SFRY in 1954.
