= Jakšić =

Jakšić (Serbian Cyrillic: Јакшић, pronounced [jǎkʃitɕ]) is a South Slavic patronymic surname derived from the given name Jakša. Notable people with the surnamre include:

- Jakšić noble family
- a family of the Drobnjaci clan
- Ana Jakšić (c. 1473–c. 1553), Serbian and Russian noblewoman
- Đura Jakšić (1832–1878), Serbian artist
- Đurađ Jakšić (born 1977), Serbian politician
- Emilija Jakšić (1924–1949), Serbian communist
- Jakov Jakšić (1774–1848), Serbian postmaster
- Jelena Jakšić (c. 1475–after 1536), despotissa of Serbia
- Jovana Jakšić (born 1993), Serbian tennis player
- Marko Jakšić (footballer, born 1983), Serbian association football player
- Marko Jakšić (footballer, born 1987), Serbian association football player
- Mileta Jakšić (1863–1935), Serbian poet
- Milovan Jakšić (1909–1953), Serbian footballer
- Nemanja Jakšić (born 1995), Serbian footballer
- Nenad Jakšić (born 1965), Serbian footballer
- Nikola Jakšić (born 1997), Serbian water polo player
- Petar Jakšić (born 2001), Serbian water polo player
- Svetolik Jaksic (1868–1928), Serbian diplomat and journalist
- Vladimir Jakšić (1824–1899), Serbian translator, economist, statistician and meteorologist

== See also ==
- Jakšići (disambiguation)
