= Jakšići =

Jakšići may refer to:

- Jakšić family (pl. Jakšići), Serbian nobility from the 15th and 16th century
- Jakšići, Primorje-Gorski Kotar County, a village near Vrbovsko, Croatia
- Jakšići, a former name of Jakšić, Požega-Slavonia County, a village near Požega, Croatia
- Jakšići, Blatuša, a hamlet of Blatuša, Croatia
- Jakšići, Cerova, a hamlet of Cerova (Krupanj), a village in Serbia
- Jakšići, Donji Velemerić, a hamlet of Donji Velemerić
- Jakšići, Glogovo, a hamlet of Glogovo, a village near Gračac, Zadar County, Croatia
- Jakšići, Gornja Trstenica, a hamlet of Gornja Trstenica, Croatia
- Jakšići, Panjak, a hamlet of Panjak, Užice, a village near Užice, Serbia
- Jakšići, Pecka, a hamlet of Pecka, Sisak-Moslavina County, Croatia
- Jakšići, Slani Potok, a hamlet of Slani Potok, Croatia
- Jakšići, Slunjski Moravci, a hamlet of Slunjski Moravci
- Donji Jakšići, Sokolac, hamlet of Sokolac, Šipovo near Šipovo, Bosnia and Herzegovina
- Donji Jakšići, Jezero, a hamlet of Jezero, Karlovac County
- Gornji Jakšići, Sokolac, hamlet of Sokolac, Šipovo near Šipovo, Bosnia and Herzegovina
- Gornji Jakšići, Jezero, a hamlet of Jezero, Karlovac County

== See also ==
- Jakšić (surname)
- Jakšiči
