= Marko Nikezić =

Serbian politician

- Марко Никезић
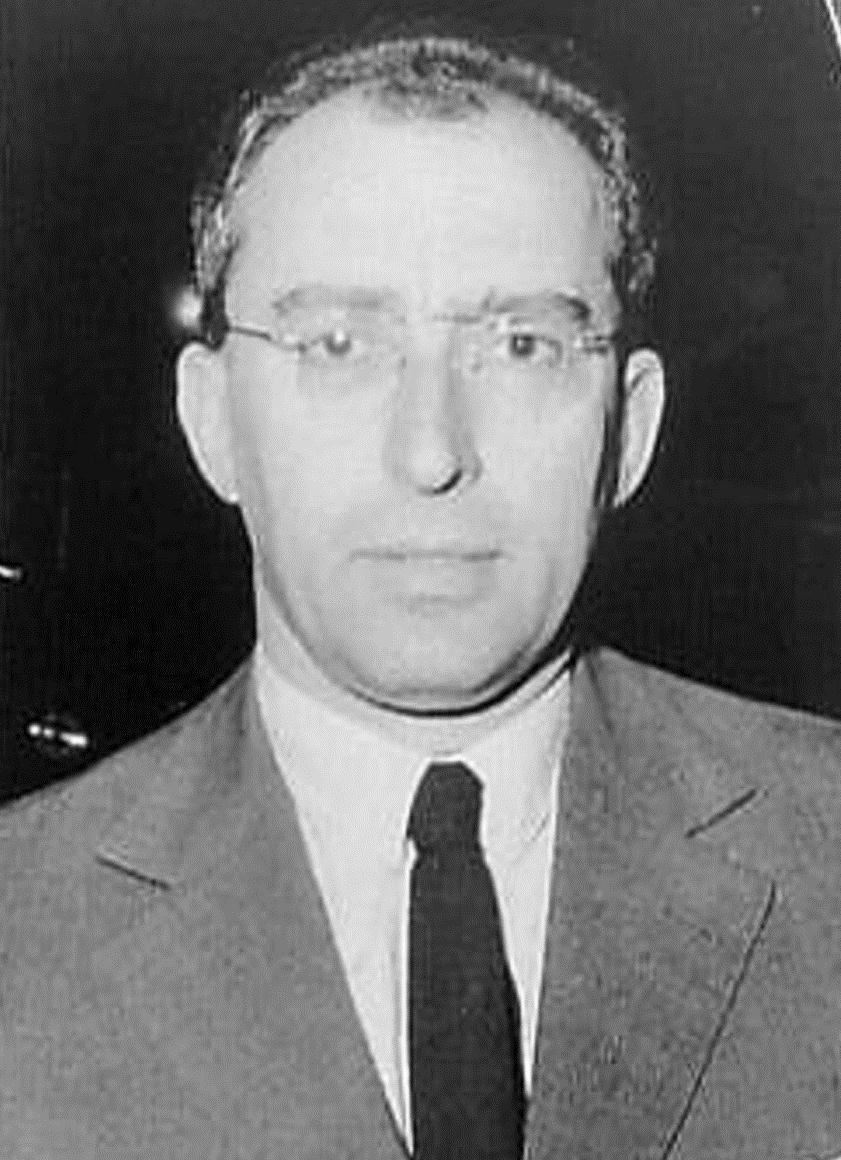

Federal Secretary of Foreign Affairs
- In office 23 April 1965 – 25 December 1968
- President: Josip Broz Tito
- Preceded by: Koča Popović
- Succeeded by: Mišo Pavićević (acting)

President of the Presidency of the League of Communists of Serbia
- In office 23 November 1968 – 25 October 1972
- Secretary: Latinka Perović
- Preceded by: Petar Stambolić
- Succeeded by: Tihomir Vlaškalić

Personal details
- Born: Marko Nikezić; 13 June 1921 Belgrade, Kingdom of Serbs, Croats and Slovenes
- Died: 6 January 1991 (aged 69) Belgrade, SR Serbia, Yugoslavia
- Party: League of Communists of Yugoslavia
- Spouse(s): Zora Bogićević; Emilija Jakšić (1924-1949; her death)
- Children: 2

Marko Nikezić (Serbian: Марко Никезић; 13 June 1921 – 6 January 1991) was a Yugoslav politician. He was a Minister of Foreign Affairs of Yugoslavia and Chairman of the League of Communists of Serbia. He was dismissed in 1972 under the charge of being "anarcho-liberal".

== Biography ==
Nikezić was born in Belgrade to a Montenegin father, Petar, and a French mother, Suzanne. He studied at the Technical Faculty at the University of Belgrade. During World War II he was a member of the Yugoslav Partisan army from 1941.

After the war, he served as Yugoslav ambassador to Egypt, Czechoslovakia and the United States of America. From 1965-68, he was a Minister of Foreign Affairs of Yugoslavia. In 1968, he became the Chairman of the League of Communists of Serbia. In 1972, he was dismissed from the office under the charge of being too "liberal" and "anarcho-liberal", alongside Latinka Perović and other Serbian high-officials. This event is known in Serbian history as the 'Purge of liberals'. He died in Belgrade in 1991.
