= Latinka Perović =

Yugoslav communist leader, historian and politician (1933–2022)

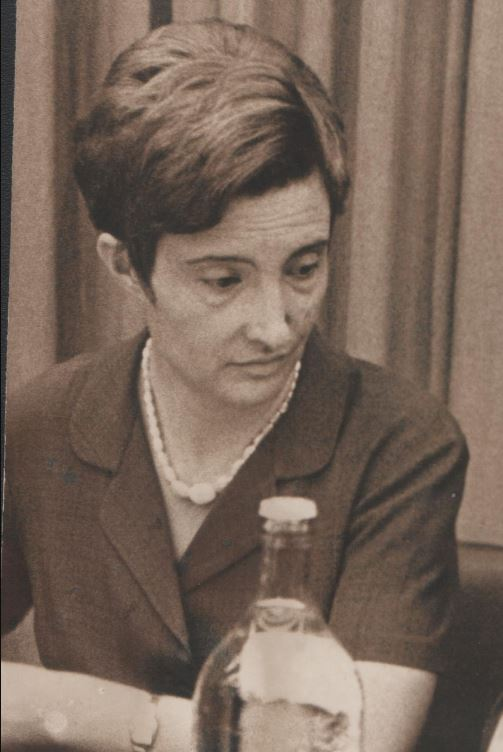

Secretary of the Executive Bureau of the League of Communists of Serbia
- In office 23 November 1968 – 25 October 1972
- President: Marko Nikezić
- Preceded by: Stevan Doronjski
- Succeeded by: Nikola Petronić

Personal details
- Born: 4 October 1933 Beloševac, Kingdom of Yugoslavia (now Kragujevac, Serbia)
- Died: 12 December 2022 (aged 89) Belgrade, Serbia
- Party: Civic Democratic Forum (2021–2022); League of Communists (until 1972)
- Education: Faculty of Philosophy (undergraduate and master) and Faculty of Political Sciences (doctoral) (University of Belgrade)
- Occupation: Politician, Historian

Latinka Perović (Serbian Cyrillic: Латинка Перовић; 4 October 1933 – 12 December 2022) was a Yugoslav communist leader, historian and politician. During the existence of the Socialist Federal Republic of Yugoslavia, Perović was a secretary general of the League of Communists of Serbia (SKS) in the period between 1968 and 1972. On 21 October 1972, Perović resigned from all her political positions together with Marko Nikezić under the accusation that they were excessively liberal. The resignations were accepted by the SKS Central Committee on 25 October. The dismissal of the Serbian communist reformers in 1972 was preceded by the removal of Croatian nationalists during the Croatian Spring.

Following her removal from active politics, Perović focused on scientific work at the Institute for the History of the Labor Movement of Serbia (modern-day Institute for Recent History of Serbia). During the 1990s breakup of Yugoslavia and the Yugoslav Wars, Perović was one of the sharpest critics of Serbian nationalism, especially Slobodan Milošević and his regime.

== Biography ==
Perović was born in Beloševac, Kragujevac, Kingdom of Yugoslavia (present Serbia) on 4 October 1933. Perović completed local female gymnasium in Kragujevac in 1952. She graduated in history at the University of Belgrade and earned a PhD degree in political science 1975 at the same university. Earlier, she also earned her master's degree at the Faculty of Political Science in Belgrade in 1965.

At the age of 27, she was already president of the Conference for the Women's Social Activity of Yugoslavia (1960–1964). Perović was Secretary of the Central Committee of the League of Communists of Serbia from 1968 to 1972. She was considered the most influential woman in Serbia then.

In 1972, Marko Nikezić (the president of the CC of the LCS) and Perović were removed from their positions because Josip Broz Tito considered their views too liberal. She never returned to politics after that. Perović devoted herself to historical research and became known as one of the most prominent experts on Serbian history from the 19th century onwards.

From 1976 to 1998 Perović worked at the Institute for Recent History of Serbia. In her writings and studies on modern Serbia, she often emphasizes that Serbia needs a politician who would publicly claim responsibility for the destruction wrought in the former Yugoslavia in order to help the reconciliation with the neighboring states and prevent the recurrence of this kind of tragedy. She was opposed to the regime of Slobodan Milošević, calling his political system a "culture of murder". After the war, she was the first person in Serbia to call the Srebrenica massacre a genocide and call for Serbia's accountability.

From 1993 Perović was an editor in chief of Currents of History magazine.

== Death ==
Perović died in Belgrade on 12 December 2022, at the age of 89. She was cremated at the Belgrade's Novo Groblje cemetery on 21 December 2022, in the presence of her family and friends.

== Selected works ==
2010 book "Facts and Interpretations. Two Conversations with Latinka Perovic" included a detailed bibliography of Latinka Perović with a list of 8 monographs, 10 historical source books with introductory studies on the 19th century, nine historical source-books with introductory studies on the 20th and 21st century, 18 forewords and postscripts, 78 studies, discussions and articles and 13 noticed reviews. Bibliography did not include articles, interviews, and speeches on book promotions, which have been published in various newspapers and magazines as well as obituaries. Perović continued writing in the following years. Her 2015 book "Dominantna i neželjena elita" (English: Dominant and Unwanted Elite) initiated critical response from Croatian Sociologist Mira Bogdanović who in her 2016 book "Elitistički pasijans: Povijesni revizionizam Latinke Perović" (English: Elitist Passians: Historical Revisionism of Latinka Perović) criticized Perović for inventing concepts of dominant and unwanted elites which do not exist in Sociological science.

=== Monographs ===
- Pera Todorović (English: Pera Todorovic). Rad. Belgrade (1983)
- Od centralizma do federalizma: KPJ o nacionalnom pitanju (English: From Centralism to Federalism: the Communist Party of Yugoslavia and the National Question). Globus. Zagreb (1984)
- Srpski socijalisti 19. veka: Prilog istoriji socijalističke misli: (English: Serbian Socialists in the Nineteenth Century: Contribution to the History of Socialist Thought) (1985-1995)
  - Knj. 1: Prvi poznavaoci i pristalice socijalističkih učenja u Srbiji (English: Book One: First Connoisseurs and Supporters of Socialist Ideas in Serbia). Rad. Belgrade (1985)
  - Knj. 2: Ideje i pokret Svetozara Markovića (English: Book Two: the Ideas and the Movement of Svetozar Markovic). Rad. Belgrade (1985)
  - Knj. 3. Doktrina narodnjaštva teorijski okvir srpskog socijalizma (English: Book Three: The Doctrine of Narodniks is a Theoretical Framework of Serbian Socialism). Službeni list SRJ. Belgrade (1995)
- Planirana revolucija. Ruski blankizam i jakobinizam (English: The Planned Revolution. Russian Blanquism). BIGZ-Globus. Belgrade-Zagreb. (1988)
- Zatvaranje kruga. Ishod rascepa 1971-1972 (English: The Closure of the Circle. Consequences of 1971-1972 Schism). Svjetlost. Sarajevo (1991)
- Srpsko-ruske revolucionarne veze. Prilozi za istoriju narodnjaštva u Srbiji (English: Serbo-Russian Revolutionary Connections. Contributions for the History of Narodnik Ideas in Serbia). Službeni list SRJ. Belgrade (1994)
- Ljudi, događaji, knjige, Helsinški odbor za ljudska prava u Srbiji (English: People, Events Books, Helsinki Committee for Human Rights in Serbia). Belgrade. (two editions). (2000)
- Između anarhije i autokratije. Srpsko društvo na prelazima vekova (XIX-XXI) (English: Between Anarchy and Autocracy. Serbian Society at the Turn of centuries (XIX-XXI)). Helsinški odbor za ljudska prava u Srbiji. Belgrade (2006)
