= Secretary of the Presidency of the League of Communists of Serbia =

Administrative leadership position

- Serbian: Секретар Председништва Савеза комуниста Србије
- Emblems of the LCY
- Type: Executive Secretary
- Member of: SKS Presidency
- Appointer: SKS Presidency
- Term length: Two years, renewable once (1972–1990)
- Constituting instrument: LCY Charter & SKS Charter
- Formation: 4 November 1966
- First holder: Stevan Doronjski
- Final holder: Milomir Minić
- Abolished: 17 July 1990

The secretary was the highest administrative leader of the Presidency of the Central Committee of the League of Communists of Serbia (SKS), the ruling party of the Socialist Republic of Serbia (SR Serbia) in the Socialist Federal Republic of Yugoslavia and a branch of the League of Communists of Yugoslavia (LCY). The officeholder was elected by and answerable to the SKS Presidency.

== Office history ==
Title	Established	Abolished	Established by
Secretary of the Executive Bureau of the Central Committee of the League of Communists of Serbia; Serbian: Секретар Извршног комитета Централног комитета Савеза комуниста Србије	4 November 1966	25 April 1974	? Plenary Session of the Central Committee of the SKS 5th Congress
Secretary of the Executive Committee of the Central Committee of the League of Communists of Serbia; Serbian: Секретар Извршног комитета Централног комитета Савеза комуниста Србије	25 April 1974	31 May 1978	7th Congress of the League of Communists of Serbia
Secretary of the Presidency of the Central Committee of the League of Communists of Serbia; Serbian: Секретар Председништва Централног комитета Савеза комуниста Србије	31 May 1978	17 July 1990	8th Congress of the League of Communists of Serbia

== Officeholders ==
Secretaries of the Presidency of the Central Committee of the League of Communists of Serbia
No.	Name	Took office	Left office	Tenure	Term of office	Birth	PM	Death	Ref.
1	Stevan Doronjski	4 November 1966	23 November 1968	2 years, 19 days	5th (1965–1968)	1919	1939	1981	
2	Latinka Perović	23 November 1968	25 October 1972	3 years, 337 days	6th (1968–1974)	1933	1951	2022	
3	Nikola Petronić	26 October 1972	15 January 1974	1 year, 81 days	6th (1968–1974)	1936	1957	2009	
4	Đorđe Lazić	15 January 1974	13 December 1975	1 year, 332 days	7th (1974–1978)	1927	1945	2018	
5	Ivan Stambolić	13 December 1975	31 May 1978	2 years, 169 days	7th (1974–1978)	1936	1954	2000	
6	Spiro Galović	31 May 1978	30 May 1982	3 years, 364 days	8th (1978–1982)	1938	1956	2014	
7	Radiša Gačić	30 May 1982	31 May 1986	4 years, 1 day	9th (1982–1986)	1938	1957	Alive	
8	Zoran Sokolović	31 May 1986	24 May 1989	3 years, 200 days	10th (1986–1990)	1938	1960	2001	
9	Milomir Minić	24 May 1989	17 July 1990	212 days	10th (1986–1990)	1950	1968	Alive	
