= Emilija Jakšić =

Serbian nationalist (1924–1949)

- Born: 29 April 1923; Belgrade, Kingdom of Yugoslavia
- Died: 29 November 1949 (aged 25); Belgrade, PR Serbia, SFR Yugoslavia
- Occupation: Activist
- Years active: 1941–1949
- Known for: National Liberation Struggle
- Spouse: Marko Nikezić
- Father: Mileta Jakšić

Emilija Jakšić-Nikezić (29 April 1924 – 29 November 1949) was a Serbian communist. She participated in the partisan resistance to Axis occupation during World War II and was a political activist for the People's Republic of Serbia.

== Biography ==
Emilija Jakšić was born in Belgrade on 29 April 1924. Her father was the poet Mileta Jakšić. She was a member of the youth revolutionary movement—the Union of Communist Youth of Yugoslavia (SKOJ)—where she carried out acts of sabotage and diversion.

In January 1942, at age 17, Jakšić became a member of the Communist Party of Yugoslavia (KPJ). She served as acting Secretary of the SKOJ District Committee and a member of the KPJ District Committee in Zemun. During her work in Zemun, she was arrested several times, and tortured badly enough to end up in the hospital; a small operation led by her future husband Marko Nikezić eventually freed her.

In October 1943, the KPJ Provincial Committee for Serbia sent her to work in Šumadija to act as an instructor for the SKOJ Provincial Committee. She eventually became a member of the SKOJ Provincial Committee in 1944. She led the creation of the newspaper Kosmajski omladinac (Kosmaj Youth) in 1944, although only two issues were printed.

Following the liberation of Belgrade and the end of World War II, Jakšić married Nikezić and began studying economics. She also held various roles in the Communist Party organization in the city, including on the City Committee of SKOJ and as a district secretary for the Communist Party of Serbia for Belgrade. In 1948, she began working for the Agitprop department of Belgrade's City Committee.

For her work, Jakšić was awarded the Commemorative Medal of the Partisans of 1941.

== Death & legacy ==
She died in a car accident near Obrenovac on 29 November 1949, aged 25.

A street, Ulica Emilije Jaksic, was named in her honor in Zemun.
