= Mileta Jakšić =

Serbian poet (1863–1935)

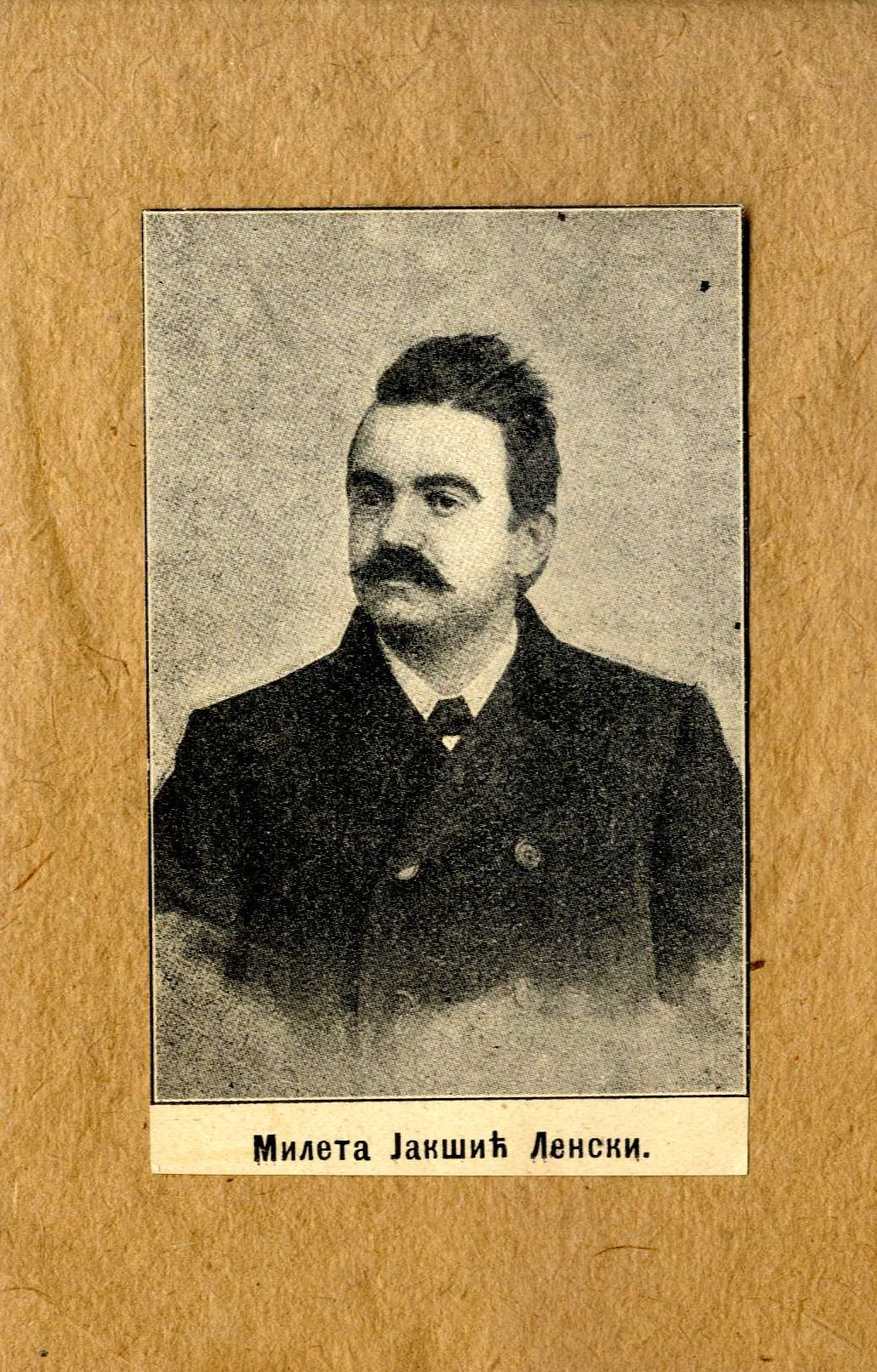
- Mileta Jakšić, c. 1899
- Born: 29 March 1863; Srpska Crnja, Austrian Empire
- Died: 8 November 1935 (aged 72); Belgrade, Kingdom of Yugoslavia
- Resting place: Belgrade New Cemetery
- Occupation: Poet
- Children: Emilija Jakšić

Mileta Jakšić (Serbian Cyrillic: Милета Јакшић; 29 March 1863 – 8 November 1935) was a Serbian poet. He had a great love of nature which is reflected in all his works.

== Biography ==
Mileta Jakšić was born on 29 March 1863 in Srpska Crnja in Banat. He was the nephew of one of the best-known Serbian poets of the 19th century, Djura Jakšić (1832-1878). He was the son of Jovan and Emilija Jakšić; his grandfather Dionisije and his father Jovan were parish priests of Srpska Crnja. At the age of seven Mileta's mother died. In 1879 Jakšić went to Novi Sad, where he was enabled to attend gymnasium. After an interval of private study in Osijek he went in 1889 to the Theological College in Sremski Karlovci and in 1893 he went to Vienna, where he fell under the influence of Vatroslav Jagić and Jakob Minor and others. On the completion of his university course in philology he returned home, was for three years rector of the Serbian Orthodox Seminary of Hopovo where he taught Serbian language, history and homiletics. From 1891 to 1899 he worked in Temisvar before returning to Srpska Crnja where he took over his father's parish until 1920.

At the age of fifty he renounced the priesthood and married Zorka Andrejević, a teacher from a nearby village of Klarija. They had a daughter, Emilija, a political activist who died in a car accident in 1949.

During World War I he collected funds for the Red Cross societies of Serbia and Montenegro. When the Axis occupied Serbia, Jakšić was imprisoned for 15 days. After leaving Srpska Crnja and priesthood, he became chief librarian of Matica Srpska in Belgrade. Jakšić died there on 8 November 1935, and was buried in Novo groblje.

== Poetry ==
Jakšić's first poems appeared in the literary review called Javor in 1891. In them, there is a strong influence of Vojislav Ilić with whom he shared a mutual friendship and literary sympathies with Pushkin and Vasily Zhukovsky. His relationship to the Vojislavist movement, which is itself continuously recruiting new founding fathers (or grandfathers as in Vojislav Ilić's tracing of the movement to Pushkin) and claiming an almost meaninglessly wide circle of progeny. The most fundamental question raised by these poets is, to be sure, nature itself.

He followed — Vojislavism — of the time, though not the only one. Among the best known Serbian poets who looked up to Vojislav Ilić's genius, during that period were Milorad Mitrović (poet), Aleksa Šantić, Danica Marković, and for a short while even Jovan Dučić who soon went on to abandon "Vojislavism" and start his own movement with Milan Rakić. Jakšić has written a large number of poems, some of which have appeared in volume form. He was the first to part company with Vojislavism and his Pesme (Poems), published in Velika Kikinda in 1899 (in volume form), demonstrates an original poet in the making. He started as a follower of Vojislav Ilić, but soon freed himself from all the "influences", to find his own original tone.

Jakšić also wrote prose, his best work is "Mysteries". When poet Veljko Petrović started writing stories Jakšić withdrew, though his prose work was considered of high literary value. Both Veljko Petrović and Mileta Jakŝić are considered the best poets of old Vojvodina in their day.

According to critic Jovan Skerlić, Mileta Jakšić was able to acknowledge the romantic poets and the nature poets. "For he follows a path that was plowed before him by Jovan Subotić and Jovan Grčić-Milenko."

== Works ==
- Pesme, Beograd 1922.
- Dečija zbirka pesama i proze, Novi Sad 1929.
- Sunčanica, Beograd 1929.
- Legende i priče za decu i odrasle, Beograd 1931.
- Mirna vremena, Beograd 1935.
- Deoba vrlika, Novi Sad
- Sveti apostol Pavle, život mu i rad, Novi Sad
- Velika tišina
- Nečista kuća
- Roman usamljenog mladića
- Urok

As editor

- Dečija zbirka, J. J. Zmaja (Novi Sad 1929)
- Dečija zbirka pesama, Vojislava Ilića (Novi Sad 1929)

Magazines and Periodicals

- Neven (1884-1887)
- Javor (1891-1893)
- Stražilovo (1892-1894)
- Otadžbina (1892)
- Bosanska vila (1892-1895, 1910-1911, 1914)
- Delo (1894)
- Ženski svet (1894)
- Brankovo kolo (1895-1899, 1903, 1906-1909, 1914)

== Sources ==
- Skerlić, Jovan (1921). Istorija srpske književnosti. Beograd.
