= Jakov Jakšić =

Serbian postmaster

- Born: Jakov Popović; November 3, 1774; Ugrinovci, Habsburg monarchy
- Died: January 29, 1848 (aged 73); Belgrade

Jakov Jakšić (Ugrinovci, 3 November 1774 - Belgrade, 29 January 1848) was an executor-master in the Belgrade military school, adjutant, and later the first postmaster in Serbia.

== Biography ==
His real name was Jakov Popović. He was born in a priestly family in Ugrinovci. He was a merchant in Pest for a time. During the First Serbian Uprising, he came to Serbia and was an executor-master, adjutant of Captain M. Đurković. Several Austrian and Russian officers trained the army, non-commissioned officers and officers in Karađorđe's Serbia. He initiated the repair of the Jakšić tower at the Belgrade fortress and was thus nicknamed Jakšić. He is one of the famous people of the First and Second uprisings; he was an adjutant in the city of Belgrade.

He was the chief treasurer (treasurer) of Prince Miloš Obrenović and carried out the first financial reform in Serbia: he separated the prince's money from the state's treasury. When he moved from the capital of Kragujevac to Belgrade, he built a house on Senjak. At that place, today's 8 Kralja Vukašina Street, his son Vladimir Jakšić made meteorological observations from 1848 to 1899. In the yard of the house, there is a chestnut tree planted in 1838.

He was the first supervisor of all post offices in Serbia. It became a decree of Prince Miloš in 1835. Jakšić's task was to organize and edit the post offices and to manage them. Among other things, the decree read ... "Wanting the post office in our country to be well organized, I appoint my court adviser Jakov Jakšić as the supervisor of the entire post office in Serbia ..." The post office belonged to the Guardianship of Internal Affairs and Prince Miloš Obrenović only withdrew this move. since he received approval from the Turkish Hatisheriff in 1830 to establish a postal service.

In addition to his house on Senjak, he inherited a shop in the family house at today's Karađorđeva 37 in Belgrade. He was the tutor of Dimitrije Crnobarac (1818-1872).
