= Svetolik Jakšić =

Svetolik Jakšić (22 March 1868 – 26 March 1928) was a diplomat, journalist and publicist.

== Biography ==
He was born in Čačak, Principality of Serbia, to mother Anka born Milijanović from Čačak and father Marko Jakšić, born in a village called Jezera na Durmitor, a lawyer. The family moved to Valjevo in the mid-1870s. He finished elementary school in Čačak, high school in Užice, Belgrade and Valjevo. He graduated from the Velika škola in Belgrade in 1892.

After school, he began working in the diplomatic service, where he progressed from clerk to consul general. In 1892, he began working as a clerk in the Serbian embassy in Berlin, where he remained for the next three years. Thanks to Ivo Pavlović, at that time the charge d'affaires in Berlin managed to enter the highest Berlin society.

He then returned to Belgrade, where he became the deputy head of propaganda at the Ministry of Foreign Affairs and the head of the Consular Department of that ministry. After that, he was the Consul General in Skopje and the Vice Consul in Bitola. At the end, he was the secretary of the embassy in Constantinople, where he remained for a full three years and during that time edited the "Constantinople Herald", at that time the only Serbian newspaper in the Ottoman Empire.

For political reasons, in 1902 he was transferred from Constantinople to the Ministry of the Interior and appointed chief of Pozarevac. Shortly afterwards, he resigned from the civil service and devoted himself to journalism.

== Works ==
His first published literary work was the short story Srećna Darinka ("Happy Darinka") in the newspaper "Srpče". As a student, he was a regular contributor to Videl, under the leadership of Milutin Garašanin, where he published a large number of political, literary articles and translations, under the pseudonym "Harry". While working as the secretary of the embassy in Constantinople, he edited the "Constantinople Herald". His travelogues, literary criticisms, works on the history of theater and art, were also published in "Valjevski novine", "Domovina", "Kola", "Dositija", "Dubrovnik", "Zora", "Politika", "Greater Serbia", "Srpski list", "Srpski književni glasnik". He also published translations from Russian. The Serbian Literary Association elected him to the committee for publishing selected translations (1897).

In 1902, after leaving the civil service, he started the daily newspaper "Štampa", which he published and edited until August 1914. This newspaper was subsidized by Austria-Hungary until the Customs War of 1907. The paper was confiscated several times, because it did not spare either the Government or the regime of the last Obrenović. He led sharp and bitter polemics with everyone, and at the same time he wrote literary reviews, which he did before the launch of this paper. He wrote a lot about Mostar's "Zora". Thanks to his abilities as a journalist, critic and polemicist, he has long been ranked among the strongest Serbian journalists, but at the same time he had many enemies.

In 1913, he was the owner and editor-in-chief of the Illustrated War Chronicle. He was a sharp polemicist and political critic of the radical government, led by Nikola Pašić.

Svetolik Jakšić lived in Switzerland from 1916 to 1917. After the Serbian government withdrew to Corfu, he took part in a political action aimed at removing Nikola Pašić and his government. The action was led by Slobodan Jovanović, surrounded by acquaintances and friends, among whom were Deputy Foreign Minister Jovan Jovanović Pižon, Regent's Secretary Dragomir Janković, diplomat Boško Čolak-Antić and others. In mid-1916, he drafted a pamphlet entitled "Letter to the Serbs in Thessaloniki" issued by the Memorandum of the Crowd called "Deputies" [6], in which he proposed a new extra-parliamentary government. the decision to investigate him and other participants in the action and bring them to court for attempted coups and actions against the state, together with other participants in the action.

He wrote several texts against the Thessaloniki process and a brochure intended for the army in Corfu, agitating against the idea of union with the Croats and advocating only Serbian interests and reconciliation with Austria-Hungary. He is suspected of cooperating with Apis in a conspiratorial action against Regent Aleksandar Karađorđević, that he was an agent of the German service during the war and that he was the writer of the constitution for the future government with Slobodan Jovanović. He was accused of treason and sentenced to ten years in prison, for which he remained living in exile, in Switzerland, Vienna and Berlin. He was amnestied in 1927.

At the end of 1927, he fell ill and went to Berlin for treatment, where, after four months in the Augusta hospital, he died in vain from a heart attack. He was temporarily buried in the Russian cemetery in Berlin.

== Sources ==
- Jovanović, Nikola B., ed. (22 April 1928). Браћа Јакшићи [The Jaksić Brothers]. Илустровани лист (in Serbian). 16. Beograd: Издавачко предузеће „Илустрација“: 30.
- Petrović, Dragoš (2009). Popov, Čedomir (ed.). Српски биографски речник, књига 4, И-Ка [Serbian biographical dictionary, book 4, I-Ka] (in Serbian). Novi Sad: Matica srpska. ISBN 978-86-7946-037-0.
- Popović, Radomir J. (2009). Popov, Čedomir (ed.). Српски биографски речник, књига 4, И-Ка [Serbian biographical dictionary, volume 4, I-Ka] (in Serbian). Novi Sad: Matica srpska. ISBN 978-86-7946-037-0.
- Popović, Dušan (1927). Stanojević, Станојевић (ed.). Народна енциклопедија српско-хрватско-словеначка, број 2, И—М [Serbian-Croatian-Slovenian national encyclopedia, number 2, I—M] (in Serbian). Zagreb: Биоблиографски завод д.д.
- Popović, Nebojša (4 September 2001). Jovović, Slavica (ed.). Мудри српски политичари (9) Беч је пратио сваки Пашићев корак [Astute Serbian politicians (9) Vienna followed Pašić's every move]. Глас јавности (in Serbian). Beograd: НИП Глас а.д. ISSN 1450-7218. Archived from the original on 11 January 2024.
