= Jezero, Karlovac County =

Jezero
- Village
- Location within Croatia
- Coordinates: 45.056°N 15.419°E
- Country: Croatia
- County: Karlovac
- Municipality: Plaški

Area
  - Total: 31.8 km^{2} (12.3 sq mi)

Population (2021)
  - Total: 61
  - Density: 1.9/km^{2} (5.0/sq mi)
- Time zone: UTC+1 (CET)
  - Summer (DST): UTC+2 (CEST)

Jezero is a village in the municipality of Plaški, in the Lika region of Croatia.

== History ==
On 10 April 1941 when the Wehrmacht entered Zagreb, a Royal Yugoslav Army column was retreating through Jezero from Plaški on their way to Bihać. The Yugoslav Army had to leave a truck full of ammunition, which the local villagers then took for their own defense. Among those was Nikola Dokmanović, who was later killed by the Ustaše because of that truck.

== Demographics ==
Village of Jezero: Population trends 1857–2011
v

| population | 558 | 583 | 683 | 644 | 701 | 609 | 610 | 674 | 680 | 549 | 516 | 432 | 384 | 322 | 57 | 77 |
| | 1857 | 1869 | 1880 | 1890 | 1900 | 1910 | 1921 | 1931 | 1948 | 1953 | 1961 | 1971 | 1981 | 1991 | 2001 | 2011 |

Note:Until 1953 simply written "Jezero", then from 1961 as "Jezero I". From 1857 to 1880 and in 1948 it included some of Gornja Močila. Sources: Croatian Bureau of Statistics publications

== Bibliography ==
=== History ===
- Lopašić, Radoslav (1894). "Urbar Modruški od g. 1486" [The Modruš Urbarium of the Year 1486]. Hrvatski urbari. Monumenta historico-iuridica Slavorum meridionalium (in Croatian). Vol. 5, 1. pp. 20–81.
  - Republished: Lopašić, Radoslav (1997). Abramović, Ignacije (ed.). Urbar modruški [The Modruš Urbarium] (in Croatian). Ogulin: Ogranak Matice hrvatske. ISBN 953-96393-4-4. Tirage: 500.
