= Vladimir Jakšić =

Serbian translator, economist, statistician and meteorologist

- Born: April 23, 1824
- Died: August 16, 1899 (aged 75)
- Father: Jakov Jakšić

Vladimir Jakšić (Serbian: Владимир Јакшић; Kragujevac, 23 April 1824 - Belgrade, 16 August 1899) was a Serbian translator, economist, statistician and meteorologist. He founded the first meteorological station network and the first weather statistics department in Serbia. He co-translated Kotzebue's La Peyrouse into Serbian with brothers Arsenije and Aksentije Tucaković in 1839.

== Biography ==
He was the son of treasurer Jakov Jakšić who worked in the State Office of Prince Miloš Obrenović. Vladimir Jakšić was educated at the Gymnasium of Belgrade, and then enrolled at the Faculty of Economics and Finance at the University of Vienna, before studying state-legal sciences at Eberhard Karls University of Tubingen and the Ruprecht Karl University of Heidelberg.

Since 1847 he worked at the Ministry of Finance, where he collected statistical weather data on his own initiative. Jakšić made his first instrumental meteorological measurements in 1848 at his estate in Topčidersko Brdo (Senjak). He never stopped working for the next half-century (1848-1999). As early as 1850 he submitted a proposal to the Državni savet (State Council) for the creation of a state statistical service, but nothing came off it yet. In 1852 he was appointed professor of National Economy and Finance at the Belgrade Lyceum (now the University of Belgrade), replacing Kosta Cukić. Then in 1862, he returned to the Ministry of Finance as Chief Economist, and in the same year, he became the head of the newly-established Statistical Office of the Republic of Serbia. This new centre for environmental information, with current and historical weather data, is the longest continuous observation that reaches back to 1768, thanks to Vladimir Jakšić's research in the archives of Vienna and his data compilation over the five decades. He headed the department but also established reliable statistical data in the archives of Serbia, with the support of Minister Kosta Cukić. Jakšić himself did most of the work of the statistical department.

He published the Državopis Srbije, the State Gazette of Serbia, as a periodical unofficially since 1855 and officially from 1863. He also published twenty scientific books of great historical importance. Jakšić first began meteorological measurements in Belgrade and Serbia in 1848 and was the first to write about meteorology in Serbia, arguably making him the founder of Serbian meteorology and climatology. Already after three years of meteorological measurements, in 1851 he made the first study of the climate of Belgrade, based on the results of his own measurements and observations for the period 1848-1850. He was also the founder of the meteorological network of stations across Serbia, with 27 meteorological stations, one of the densest meteorological networks within a country. He retired in 1888, and his job in statistics was continued by Bogoljub Jovanović. On 8 January 1850, Jakšić was elected a full member of the Društva srpske slovesnosti (Society Of Serbian Letters) in Belgrade.

He received many awards, including the Austro-Hungarian Order of Franz Joseph, the Romanian Order of the Crown, the Greek Order of the Redeemer, the Russian Order of Saint Anne, the Russian Order of Saint Stanislaus, the Serbian Order of the White Eagle and the Serbian Order of the Cross of Takovo.

== See also ==
- Konstantin Popović-Komoraš
- Arkadije Belan
- Lazar Zuban
- Nikola Djurkovic
