= League of Communists of Yugoslavia =

Ruling party of Yugoslavia (1919–1990)

- Leader: Josip Broz Tito (longest serving)
- Founder: Filip Filipović
- Founded: 20 April 1919
- Dissolved: 22 January 1991
- Merger of: SSDP (in Kingdom of Serbia); SDS HiS (in Croatia-Slavonia); SDP BiH (in Bosnia and Herzegovina); JSDS (in Carniola and Istria)
- Succeeded by: SK-PJ (from Army branch); SRSJ (centre-left faction); SPS (in Serbia); SDP (in Croatia); SDP BiH (in Bosnia and Herzegovina); SD (in Slovenia); SDSM (in North Macedonia); DPS (in Montenegro)
- Headquarters: Marx and Engels Square, Belgrade (1945–1964); Palace of Socio-Political Organisations, Belgrade (1964–1991)
- Newspaper: Borba
- Youth wing: League of Socialist Youth of Yugoslavia
- Women's wing: League of Women's Associations of Yugoslavia
- Pioneer wing: Union of Pioneers of Yugoslavia
- Military wing: National Liberation Army (1941–1945); Yugoslav People's Army (1945–1991)
- Membership: ▲2,117,083 (1981 est.)
- Ideology: Communism; Marxism–Leninism; Titoism; Socialist patriotism
- Political position: Left-wing to far-left
- National affiliation: Unitary National Liberation Front (1934–1945); Socialist Alliance of Working People (1945–1990)
- Regional affiliation: PSOM (historical)
- International affiliation: Communist International (1920–1943); Cominform (1947–1948)
- Colours: Red
- Slogan: "Proleteri svih zemalja, ujedinite se!" (transl. Workers of the world, unite!)
- Anthem: "The Internationale"
- Branches: See list: LC of Serbia; LC of Vojvodina; LC of Kosovo; LC of Croatia; LC of Bosnia and Herzegovina; LC of Macedonia; LC of Slovenia; LC of Montenegro; Army branch of the LCY

Party flag
- Other flag: Flag of the League of Communists of Yugoslavia (in Cyrillic)

The League of Communists of Yugoslavia (Note: Serbo-Croatian: Савез комуниста Југославије (CKJ), Savez komunista Jugoslavije (SKJ) Slovene: Zveza komunistov Jugoslavije Macedonian: Сојуз на комунистите на Југославија, romanized: Sojuz na komunistite na Jugoslavija) (LCY), known from 1920 to 1952 as the Communist Party of Yugoslavia (Note: Serbo-Croatian: Комунистичка партија Југославије (КПЈ), Komunistička partija Jugoslavije (KPJ) Slovene: Komunistična partija Jugoslavije Macedonian: Комунистичка партија на Југославија, romanized: Komunistička partija na Jugoslavija) (CPY), was the founding and ruling party of the Socialist Federal Republic of Yugoslavia. It was formed in 1919 as the main communist opposition party in the Kingdom of Serbs, Croats and Slovenes and after its initial successes in the elections, it was proscribed by the royal government and was at times harshly and violently suppressed. It remained an illegal underground group until World War II when, after the invasion of Yugoslavia in 1941, the military arm of the party, the Yugoslav Partisans, became involved in a bloody civil war and defeated the Axis powers and their local auxiliaries. After the liberation from foreign occupation in 1945, the party consolidated its power and established a one-party state, which existed in that form of government until 1990, a year prior to the start of the Yugoslav Wars and breakup of Yugoslavia.

Led by Josip Broz Tito from 1937 to 1980, it was the first communist party in power to defy the Soviet hegemony in the Eastern Bloc and thus was expelled from the Cominform in 1948 in what is known as the Tito–Stalin split. After internal purges of pro-Soviet members, the party renamed itself the League of Communists in 1952 and adopted the politics of workers' self-management and an independent path to achieving socialism, known as Titoism.

== Opposition party ==
=== Establishment ===
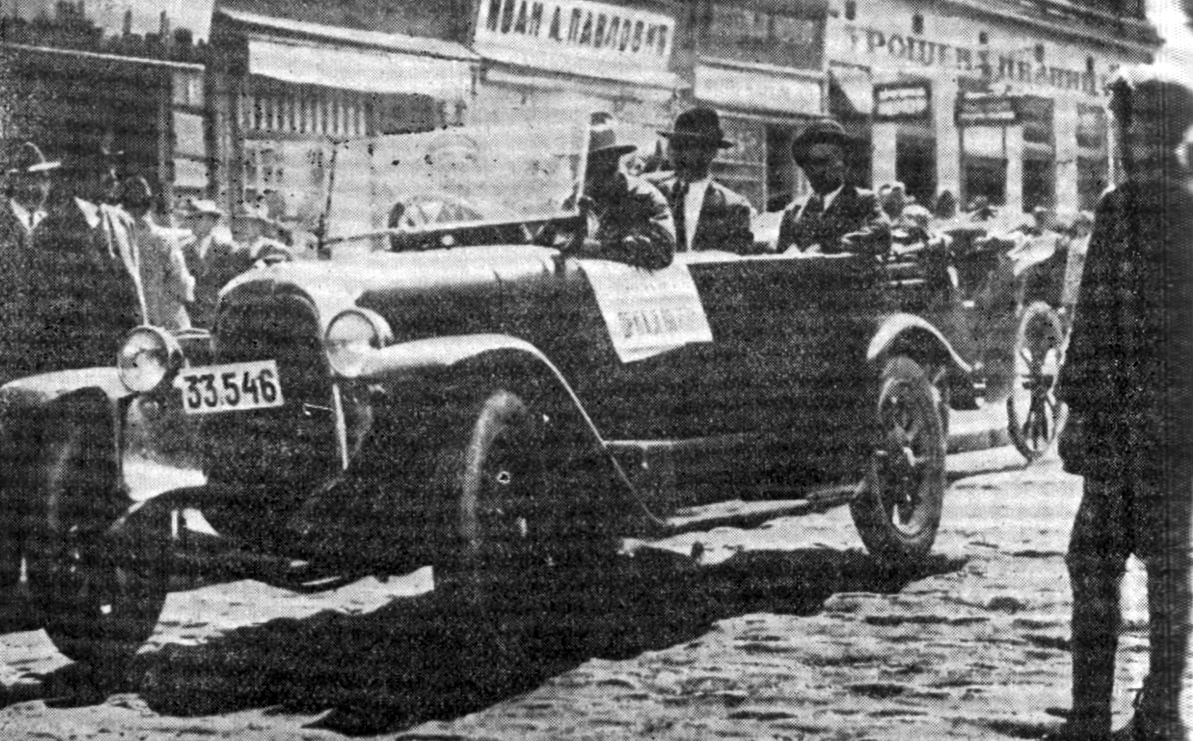
Election campaign of CPY in 1920

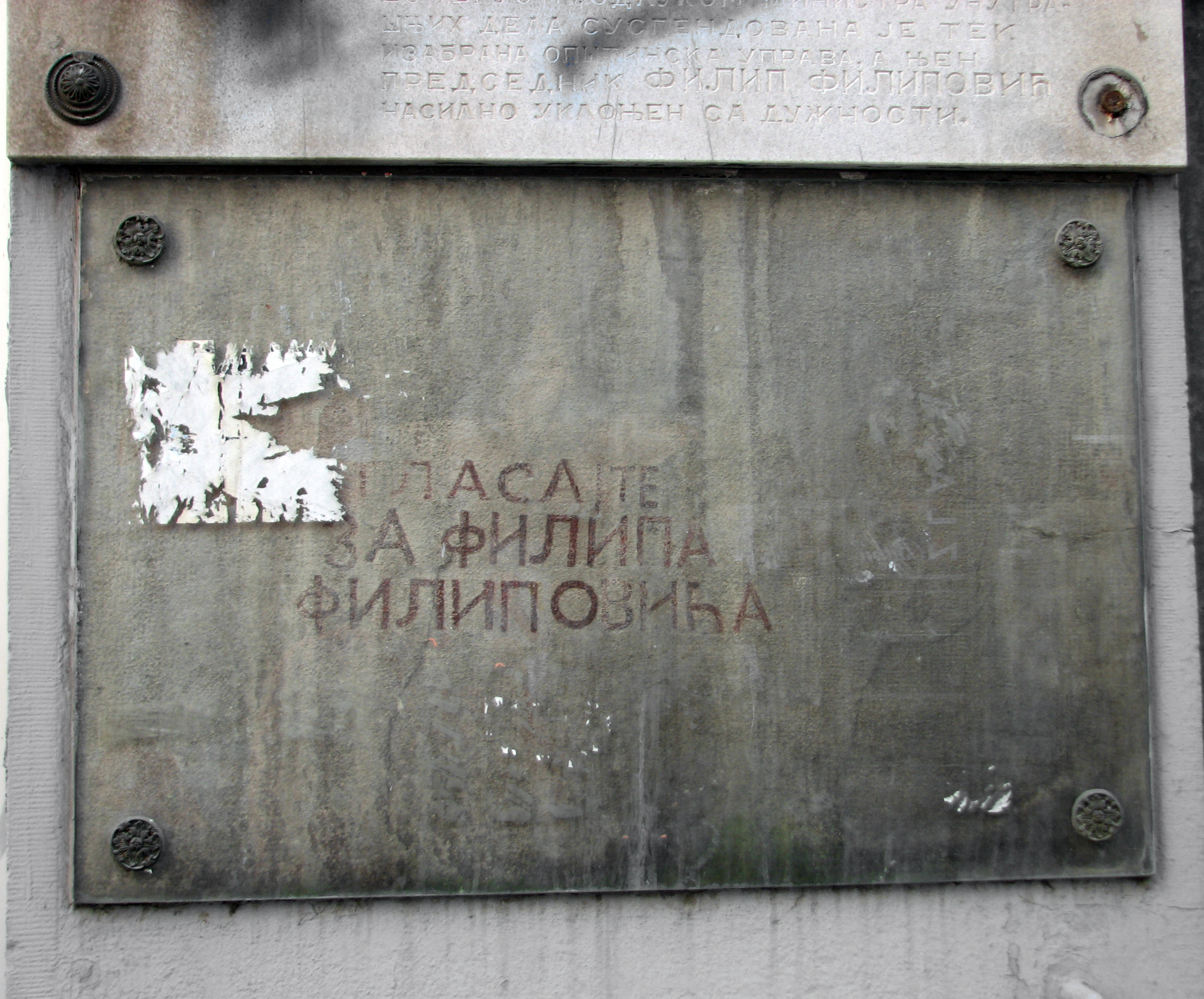
Preserved 1920 local elections slogan Гласајте за Филипа Филиповића ('Vote for Filip Filipović') written on a wall in the Sremska Street in Belgrade. Filipović was elected mayor of Belgrade, but, refusing to pledge the oath to the King, he was not permitted to assume the office.

The Kingdom of Serbs, Croats and Slovenes (later renamed Yugoslavia) was established in late 1918 at the end of the World War I. Socialist movement in the territory of the new state reflected political divisions existing before the war. For example, in what was then Austria-Hungary, the Social Democratic Party of Croatia and Slavonia (SDPCS) came into existence in 1894, two years before the Yugoslav Social-Democratic Party (Jugoslovanska socialdemokratska stranka, JSDS) was set up in Slovene lands. The Serbian Social Democratic Party (SSDP) was founded in 1903. In Bosnia and Herzegovina, the Social Democratic Party of Bosnia and Herzegovina (SDPBH) was established in 1909.

The SSDP deemed it natural to serve, as the largest social-democratic party in the new state, to unify like-minded political groups in the country. The SDPBH formally proposed a merger of such parties, but the SDPCS, the JSDS, and Serbian–Bunjevac social-democrats from Vojvodina declined. In turn, only the SSDP and the SDPBH formally agreed to a merger by January 1919. A minority group on the left wing of the SDPCS split from the party as the Action Committee of the Left (Akcioni odbor ljevice) and opted for the unified social-democratic party with the SSDP and the SDPBH. Soon afterwards, the Vojvodina social-democrats reversed their decision. The Unification congress of the Socialist Labor Party of Yugoslavia (Communists) (Socijalistička radnička partija Jugoslavije (komunista), SRPJ(k)) was held in Belgrade on 20–23 April 1919 as consolidation on the left of the political spectrum. The new party was joined by the SSDP en masse, and by independent leftists who splintered away from various nationalist youth organisations and social democratic parties. The Labour Socialist Party of Slovenia (Delavska socialistična stranka za Slovenijo) split from the JSDS and joined the SRPJ(k) on 13 April 1920.

Clashes continued within the party between leftists and centrists – the latter favouring pursuit of reforms through a parliamentary system. The leftist faction prevailed at the second congress held in Vukovar on 20–24 June 1920 and adopted a new statute. That aligned the party entirely with the Communist International (Comintern), implementing all instructions received from the Comintern. Furthermore, the party was renamed the Communist Party of Yugoslavia (Komunistička partija Jugoslavije, KPJ) to allow its membership in the Comintern. Filip Filipović and Sima Marković, both former SSDP activists, were elected to lead the KPJ. By May 1920, the KPJ had about 50,000 members, and numerous sympathisers largely drawn from among 300,000 members of trade unions and youth organisations.

=== 1920 elections and ban ===
In the 1920 Constitutional Assembly election, the KPJ won 58 out of 419 seats. The best results were achieved in large cities, in Montenegro and Macedonia as a result of protest votes against the regime on account of past or expected actions coming from unemployed urban voters and from voters in regions having no other attractive national or regional opposition parties found in the Slovene lands, Croatia-Slavonia, and Bosnia and Herzegovina. In light of difficult economic and social circumstances, the regime viewed the KPJ as the main threat to the system of government. In response to the KPJ's electoral success at the local and regional level including Belgrade and Zagreb earlier that year in March–August, and at the national level the Democratic Party and the People's Radical Party advocated prohibition of communist activity. The regime saw the KPJ as the greatest impediment to realisation of views held by King Peter I on resolution of Serbian national question.

In December 1920, KPJ-led miner strikes in Slovenia and Bosnia and Herzegovina led to suppression by the royal army and restrictions on communist propaganda. The violence served as a pretext for prosecution of the KPJ. On 30 December, the government issued Obznana, a decree outlawing the KPJ. A faction of the KPJ named Red Justice (Crvena pravda) attempted to assassinate the Regent Alexander on 28 June, and then killed former Interior Minister Milorad Drašković on 21 July. This led to proclamation of the Law on the Protection of the Realm turning the KPJ ban into legislation on 2 August, annulment of the KPJ seats in the national assembly two days later, and numerous covert police agents infiltrating the KPJ.

=== Move abroad and underground ===
Despite the electoral success, the ban and KPJ's consequent move to covert operation took a heavy toll on the party in the next decade and a half when, faced with factional struggle, it would increasingly look to the Comintern for guidance. By 1924, the KPJ membership was reduced to 688. Additionally, some members emigrated abroad – most to Moscow, but also to Vienna, Prague, and Paris. Indeed, the KPJ held a land conference in Vienna in 1922, where the party leadership moved the year before.

In the early 1920s, KPJ saw more factional struggle between its right wing led by Marković and Belgrade-based trade union leaders Lazar Stefanović and Života Milojković advocating work through legal means to regain government approval, and leftists, including Đuro Cvijić, Vladimir Ćopić, Triša Kaclerović, Rajko Jovanović, and Kosta Novaković, favouring Leninist undercover struggle. The leftists also supported a federalisation of the state, while the others pushed for limited regional autonomy only.

The leftists prevailed at the January 1924 Third Land Conference held covertly in Belgrade where the KPJ proclaimed the right of each nation to secede and form its national state. In June, the Comintern instructed the KPJ that self-determination should take shape of independent Slovenian, Croatian, and Macedonian republics. The stance taken by the Comintern was influenced by Moscow visit by Stjepan Radić, the leader of the Croatian Peasant Party (Hrvatska seljačka stranka, HSS) when Radić added the HSS to the Peasant International (Krestintern) – itself an agency of the Comintern.

Furthermore, the Comintern criticised the factional clashes in the KPJ over the national question in its 1924 Resolution of National Question which linked social emancipation to national one in strategic considerations. In response, Milojković was expelled, but Marković remained a part of KPJ leadership. This changed in 1925 when he was denounced by the leader of the Soviet Union Joseph Stalin personally before Yugoslav commission of the Comintern insisting that the KPJ must harness national movements for revolutionary aims. Regardless, the factional struggle continued. In 1927, the seat of the KPJ central committee in Yugoslavia was moved from Belgrade to Zagreb.

=== Leftists prevail ===
In February 1928, Josip Broz Tito and Andrija Hebrang, seeking to stir the existing situation into resolution of the conflict, persuaded the delegates to conference of the Zagreb KPJ organisation to adopt a resolution seeking the Comintern to intervene and end the factional struggle in the KPJ entirely. The KPJ also led some of street protests in Croatia over assassination of Radić later that year. The Comintern Sixth World Congress held that year sought to increase revolutionary struggle and the strategy was accepted by the KPJ at its Fourth Congress held in Dresden in October 1928. The appeal made at the initiative of Tito and Hebrang was accepted: Marković was expelled and his allies demoted, while new leadership was installed. Tito and Hebrang were bypassed because they were just imprisoned in Yugoslavia, and Đuro Salaj, Žika Pecarski, and Đuro Đaković were appointed instead as entirely Comintern-trained leadership.

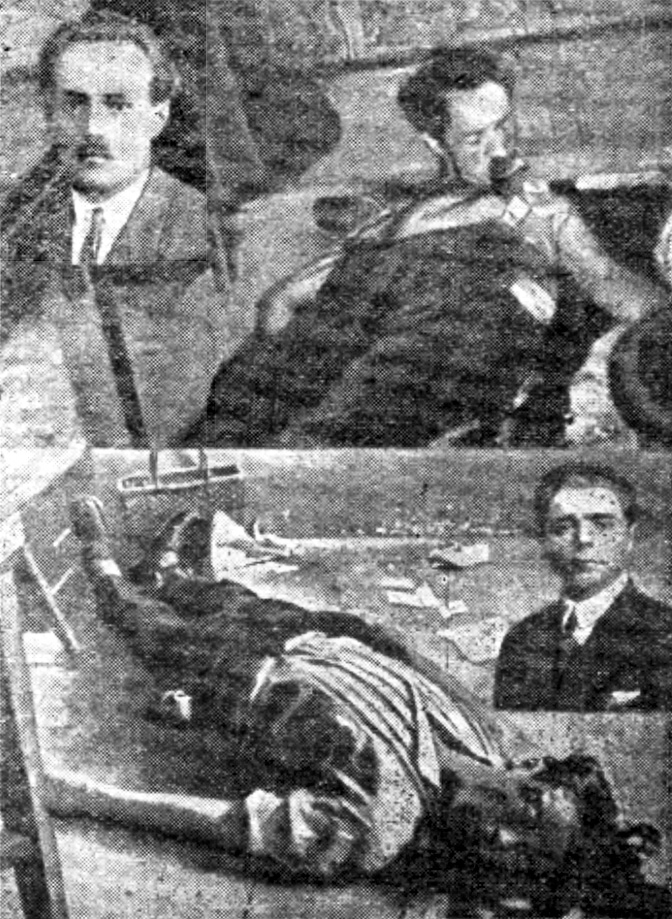
Police photos of murdered secretaries of the Young Communist League, Janko Mišić and Mijo Oreški, who were killed in a standoff with police on 27 July 1929 in Samobor.

In 1929, the new KPJ leadership put the Comintern's call to violence into practice, but instead of all-out revolt, the efforts were consisted of leaflets and several shoot-outs with the police. KPJ losses were heavy and included death of several significant leaders including Đaković and imprisonment of its most active members by specially convened antisubversive tribunals. In turn, the Sremska Mitrovica Prison became a makeshift KPJ training school as the prison allowed grouping of political prisoners.

On instructions from the Comintern, non-Serb members of the KPJ were to advocate breakup of Yugoslavia as a construct of the Western Powers. However at the time, most of their efforts were invested in struggle against the JSDS and debating revolutionary merits of literature written by Miroslav Krleža. By 1932, membership dwindled to less than 500, the KPJ maintained its leadership divided in at least two locations at all times in 1928–1935, including at least one abroad in Moscow, Prague, Vienna, or Paris.

Also acting on Comintern July 1932 instructions to promote and aid national revolt in Croatia, Slovenia, Montenegro, and Macedonia, the KPJ sought to establish ties with the Bulgaria-based Internal Macedonian Revolutionary Organization, but the organisation was suffering from its internal weaknesses and suppressed by 1934. There were also overtures towards Italian-based Ustaše as a Croatian secessionist organisation. KPJ leaders praised the Ustaše-initiated Lika uprising in 1932, hoping to steer Ustaše to the political left. Even though support for Ustaše efforts in Lika and Dalmatia was declared through Proleter newspapers in December 1932, the bulk of contact with them was limited to contact with fellow prison inmates trying to engage them over the shared goal of breakup of Yugoslavia.

=== Gorkić and turn to popular front ===
The "ultra-leftist" line pursued since 1928 was abandoned in 1933 when Adolf Hitler came to power in Germany. Instead, the KPJ turned the idea of forming a popular front together with other anti-fascist organisations. The strategy aimed to attract broad coalition of allies since it was no longer thought feasible to achieve quick introduction of communist rule. The popular front strategy coincided with assignment of Milan Gorkić to the KPJ leadership from his posting at the Comintern in 1932. Gorkić set about to introduce discipline to the KPJ top ranks and establish ties with the JSDS, the HSS, the Montenegrin Federalist Party, the Slovene Christian Socialists, and pro-Russian right wing organisations in Serbia with Moscow now advocating Yugoslav unity. This placed the KPJ at odds with the Comintern which continued to advocate breakup of Yugoslavia until signing of the Molotov–Ribbentrop Pact in August 1939. Still, Gorkić largely stayed out of Yugoslavia. In 1934, he appointed Tito, just released from jail, to organise secret KPJ congress in Ljubljana later that year. Gorkić was appointed the general secretary of the KPJ in 1936, with Sreten Žujović and Rodoljub Čolaković as central committee members. Tito was appointed by the Comintern as the organisational secretary of the KPJ in Moscow in September of the same year and he moved to Vienna a month later.

In July 1937, Gorkić was summoned from his Paris base to Moscow where he was arrested. In addition to him, there were about 900 communists of Yugoslav origin or their supporters in the Soviet Union who fell victim to the Stalin's Great Purge as did 50 other KPJ officials posted in Moscow including Cvijić, Ćopić, Filipović, Marković, and Novaković. The Soviet subsidy to the KPJ was suspended. The move left Tito in de facto control of the KPJ as his position was ranked second only to the one held by Gorkić.

=== Tito assumes power ===
Tito spent 1937 and early 1938 in Yugoslavia organising the KPJ there as a disciplined covert organisation drawing new members loyal to the communist ideas and Tito personally from all nations within Yugoslavia, except Macedonians. During this period, Tito intervened in conflict among groups of KPJ members incarcerated in Sremska Mitrovica. The conflict centred on the popular front strategy advocated by Hebrang and supported by Moša Pijade, Josip Kraš, and Đuro Pucar and denounced by Petko Miletić backed by Milovan Đilas and Aleksandar Ranković – the latter labelled Wahhabites by Pijade because of their radicalism. The conflict escalated to an attempt to kill Hebrang. Tito worked with Pijade to arrange a compromise by including Đilas and Ranković in the temporary KPJ leadership along with Croatian moderate popular front supporters Kraš and Andrija Žaja as well as Soviet-educated Slovene Edvard Kardelj.

In 1937, the Comintern compelled the KPJ to formally establish the Communist Party of Croatia (Komunistička partija Hrvatske, KPH) and the Communist Party of Slovenia (Komunistična partija Slovenije). The two parties were nominally independent, but actually within the KPJ. This was later the precedent for establishment of communist parties in other parts of Yugoslavia. Still the KPH leadership headed by Kraš and Žaja came into conflict with Tito in 1938 when the KPH supported the HSS instead of the Party of the Working People as the KPJ front founded for participation in 1938 parliamentary elections.

The temporary leadership put together by Tito remained largely unchanged when Tito received the Comintern mandate to lead the KPJ in 1939. Miletić was released from prison that year and sought to replace Tito. Months later he disappeared after he was summoned to Moscow and arrested by the NKVD as a victim of a series of purges in the KPJ in 1937–1940 which strengthened Tito's position.

In 1940, the KPJ successfully completed the campaign to diminish influence of Krleža and his literary adherents who were advocating Marxist ideas and opposed Stalinisation fearing totalitarianism. Also, Tito removed Kraš and Žaja from the leading positions in the KPH and replaced them by Rade Končar.

In October 1940, the Fifth Land Conference of the KPJ was held covertly in Zagreb, as the final act of Tito's campaign to assume full control of the party. The conference represented a full takeover of now organisationally stronger, centralized, disciplined, and bolshevized, but politically isolated KPJ by Tito in full alignment with the leftist line pursued by the Comintern at the time. The national question was placed at the centre of the KPJ policy at the conference where Tito criticised long gone Marković and Gorkić for lack of understanding of the issue. As Tito consolidated his control, the KPJ membership grew to 6,000 in 1939 and to 8,000 by 1941, with many more other supporters.

The final months of 1940 were marked by militarisation of politics in Yugoslavia leading to incidents such as the armed clash between the KPJ and the far-right Yugoslav National Movement in October leaving five dead and 120 wounded. The structural changes of the KPJ, strategic use of the national question and social emancipation to mobilise supporters made the party ideologically and operationally ready for armed resistance in the approaching war.

== Armed resistance ==
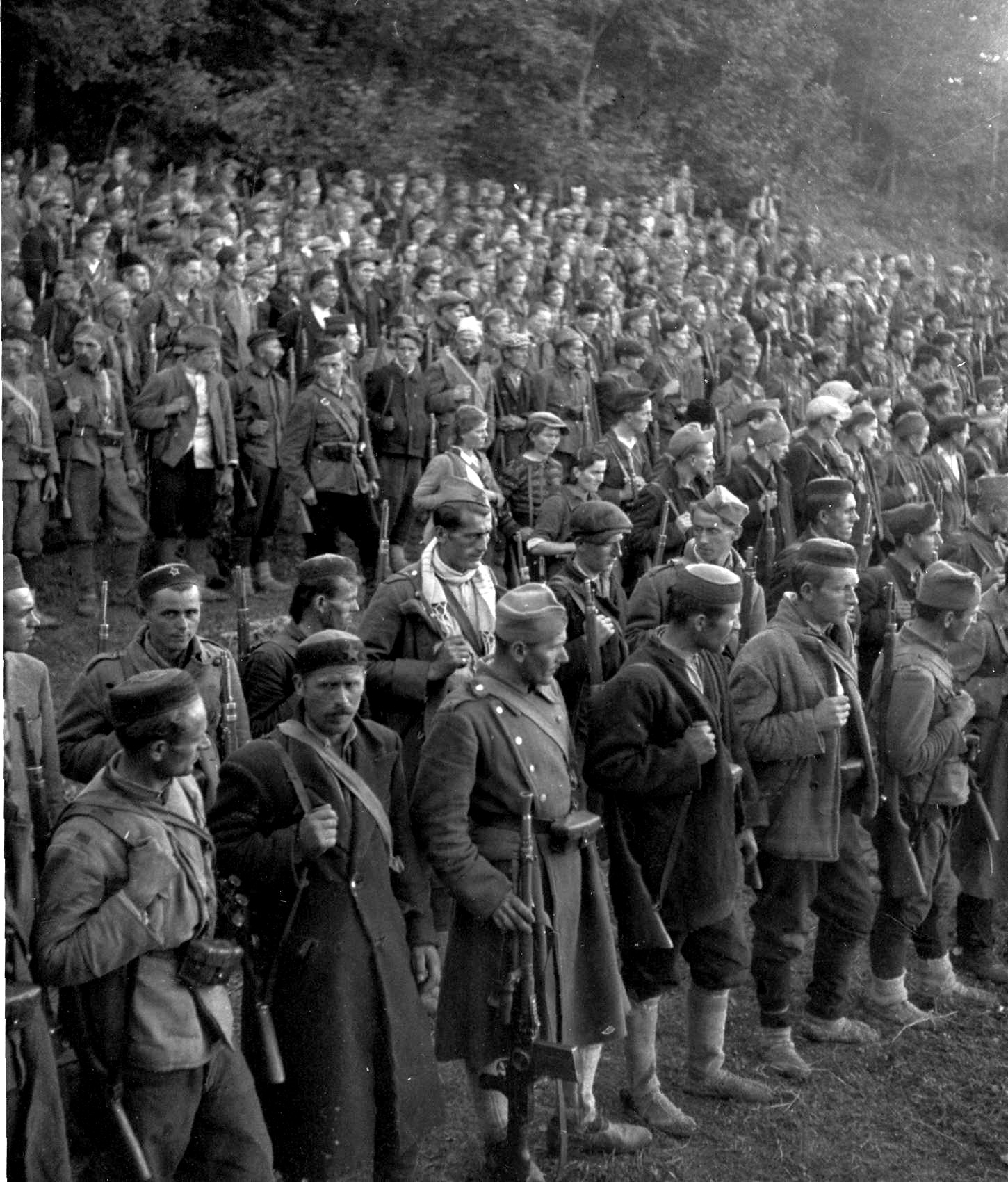
Yugoslav Partisans mobilised by the Communist Party of Yugoslavia

=== Setting up the Partisan force ===
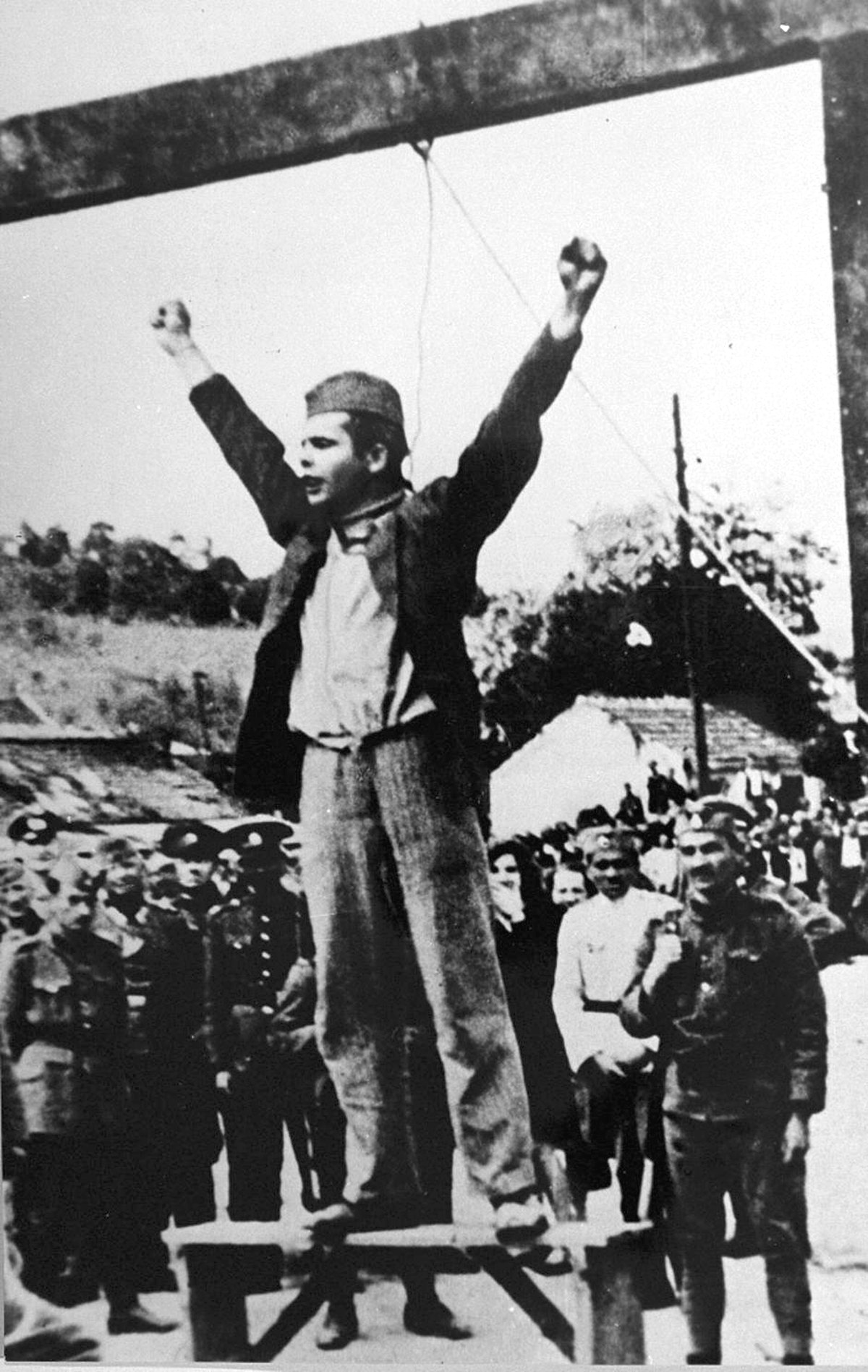
Partisan fighter Stjepan Filipović shouting "Death to fascism, freedom to the people!" seconds before his execution by a Serbian State Guard unit in Valjevo, 22 May 1942.

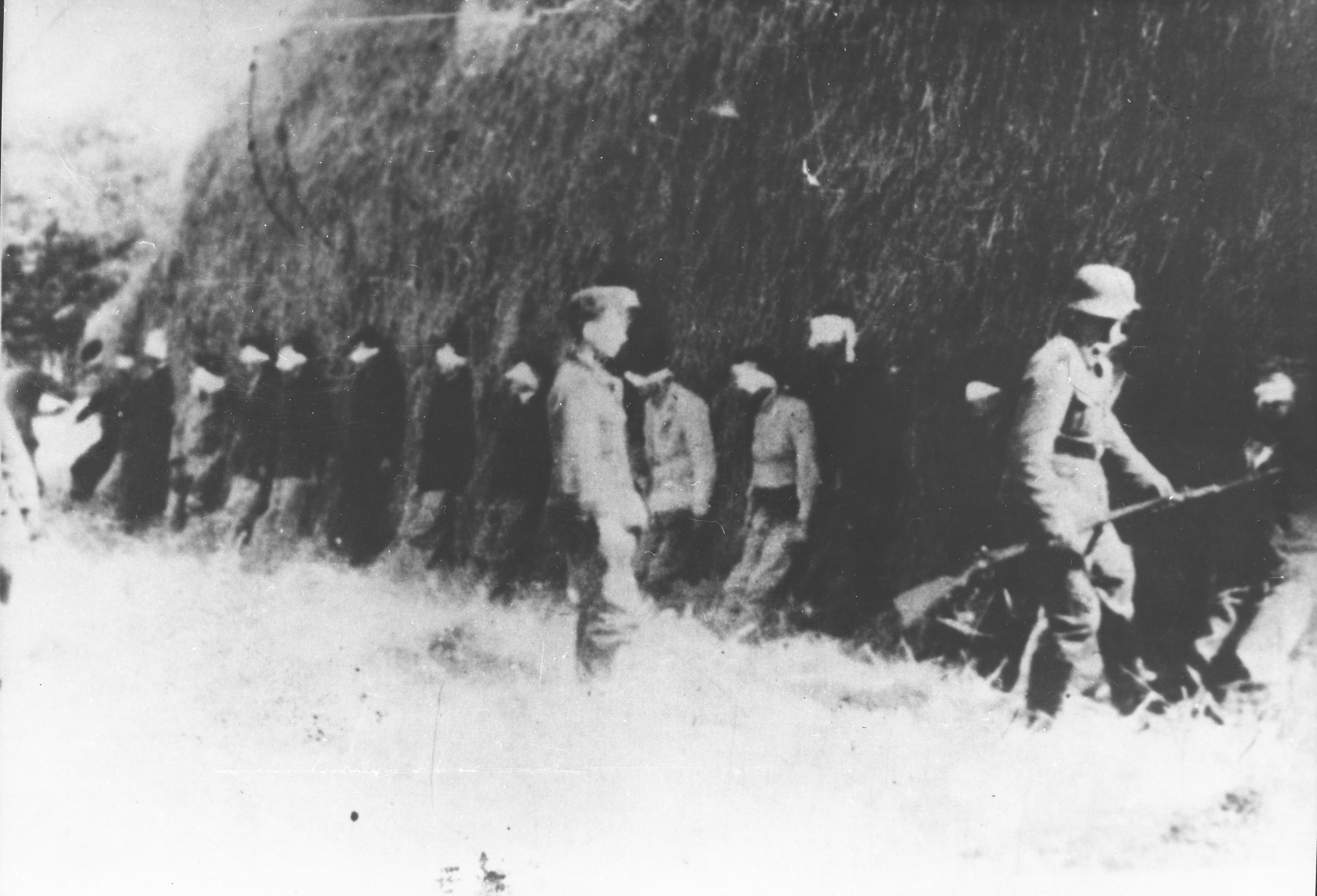
Sixteen blindfolded Partisan youth await execution by German forces in Smederevska Palanka, 20 August 1941.

During brief resistance of the Royal Yugoslav Army against the Axis invasion of the country, Tito was in Zagreb. Two days after outbreak of hostilities, the KPJ and the KPH requested arms from the 4th Army headquarters to help defend the city, but they were denied. With the Yugoslav defeat imminent, the KPJ instructed its 8,000 members to stockpile weapons in anticipation of armed resistance, which would spread, by the end of 1941 to all areas of the country except Macedonia.

Building on its experience in clandestine operation across the country, the KPJ proceeded to organise the Yugoslav Partisans, as resistance fighters led by Tito. The KPJ assessed that the German invasion of the Soviet Union had created favourable conditions for an uprising and its politburo founded the Supreme Headquarters of the National Liberation Army of Yugoslavia (Narodonooslobodilačka vojska Jugoslavije) with Tito as commander in chief on 27 June 1941.

In terms of military training, the Partisans relied on those among its ranks who had completed the mandatory national service in the Royal Yugoslav Army or fought in the Spanish Civil War. Many KPJ members were veterans of that conflict, and would go on to assume commanding positions in the Partisan ranks. In addition to military training, political training was given increasing importance as the war progressed. It was provided by political commissars based on the Soviet model. The commissaries were a part of the detachment staff, units originally ranging in size from 50 to 500 or even 1,000. A commissar's cap badge was made distinct from other Partisans. Namely, the red star on their cap was defaced with the hammer and sickle. The move drew criticism from the Liberation Front of the Slovene Nation (Osvobodilna fronta slovenskega naroda, OF) civil resistance organisation – which accused the KPJ of creating its own army. In response, Slovene Partisan commissars' caps were adorned with red stars defaced with letters "OF" instead. By 1942, typically 30–50 percent of Partisan unit personnel declared themselves as communists. Selection of personnel deemed the best for 14 Proletarian Brigades increased this share in those units – to more than 60 percent in some instances. According to Yugoslav sources, the Partisan forces grew to 800,000 by 1945 through volunteers, conscription of men aged 17–50, and defections of enemy troops promised amnesty.

=== Leftist errors ===
KPJ's strategic approach was complex because of pressures from the Comintern prioritising social struggle competing with the national liberation in substantially regionally uneven circumstances resulting from Axis partitioning of Yugoslavia, especially from creation of Axis-satellite of the Independent State of Croatia (Nezavisna Država Hrvatska, NDH).

In Macedonia, the regional organisation led by Metodi Shatorov switched allegiance from the KPJ to the Bulgarian Communist Party, practically recognising Bulgarian annexation of the area. Collapse of Užice Republic, a Partisan-controlled territory in occupied Serbia in 1941 during a German and Chetnik offensive was, in part, helped by views of local peasants who viewed Chetnik propaganda more favourably than communist social radicalism in light of preservation of their property.

Following the German defeat at Moscow in late 1941, the KPJ leadership thought that the war was nearly over and went to ensure full control by the KPJ in the country. In the period until spring of 1942, this policy was generally confined to Montenegro and eastern Herzegovina, and in a lesser draconian form to the area of present-day Vojvodina and Slovenia. It largely consisted of killing of class enemies where individual Partisan units were given quotas of required executions. It also meant forced labour for peasants deemed idle or even untidy. The targeted populations were driven to support Chetniks or other Axis forces, and the policy thus undermined the overall struggle – in turn causing the KPJ to criticise the perpetrators ignoring the role of its Central Committee in formulation of the policy. Similarly, the KPJ penalised Petar Drapšin and Miro Popara as proponents of the policy, but ignored similar roles played by Đilas, Ivan Milutinović, and Boris Kidrič. In spring of 1942, the policy known as the Leftist errors was abandoned.

=== Conflict of policy in Croatia ===
Policies employed by the NDH, enforced by the Ustaše against Serbs and ceding of Dalmatia to Italy through the Treaties of Rome created a natural base for Partisan recruitment among the Serbs, and Croats (particularly in Dalmatia) respectively. Furthermore, establishment of the NDH fractured the HSS into three groups – one supporting the armed resistance, another supporting the NDH, and an indecisive group around HSS leader Vladko Maček employing a waiting tactic. In February 1942, the KPH leadership under Hebrang saw this as an opportunity for the Croatian Partisans to wrest the position of the central patriotic force among Croats from the HSS.

In effect, Hebrang thus pursued a policy close to the wartime Soviet coalitionist views, supporting a certain level of involvement of the former members of the HSS, and the Independent Democratic Party, as well as representatives of associations and trade unions in the political life as a form of a "mass movement", including in the work of the State Anti-fascist Council for the National Liberation of Croatia as the top tier political body intended to grow into the future People's Parliament of Croatia.

Furthermore, Hebrang declared support for more moderate social policies, and advocated Croatia's autonomy within the Yugoslav federation. He argued that Serbs of Croatia should be primarily loyal to the Croatian federal unit which would ensure their political representation and preservation of their culture. Nonetheless, the increased Croatian character of the KPH caused anxiety among the Serbs. The independent policy pursued by the KPH brought Tito and Hebrang into conflict with pursuit of nationalist policy as the principal charge against the KPH. Due Hebrang's popularity, the KPJ wanted to avoid antagonising Croats during the wartime struggle and instead, just two weeks before the Red Army and the Partisans took the capital from Germans, reassigned Hebrang to Belgrade to become the minister of industry and filled the leading role in the KPH with Vladimir Bakarić.

=== Proclamation of new government ===
In November 1942, the Partisans captured the town of Bihać and secured control over a large part of western Bosnia, Dalmatia and Lika they named the Bihać Republic. In the town, a pan-Yugoslav assembly – the Anti-Fascist Council for the National Liberation of Yugoslavia (Antifašističko vijeće narodnog oslobođenja Jugoslavije, AVNOJ) – was established in the town at the initiative of Tito and the KPJ later that month. At its founding meeting, the AVNOJ adopted the principle of federal state as the solution for future. In the wake of the Bihać meeting, there were land councils established as political bodies representative of individual parts of the future federation.

The AVNOJ convened for the second time in Jajce in November 1943, declaring itself as the future parliament of the new Yugoslav state, affirmed commitment to forming a democratic federation without specifying any details of such federation. It also denied authority of the Yugoslav government-in-exile and forbade the King Peter II return to the country. A month before the Jajce meeting, the central committee of the KPJ created the National Committee for the Liberation of Yugoslavia as the new Yugoslav government, and the AVNOJ confirmed its composition – including Tito as its president. Tito's position was reinforced through the Tito–Šubašić Agreements he concluded with the government-in-exile in the second half of 1944 and early 1945. On the basis of those agreements, the government-in-exile was replaced with the Provisional Government of the Democratic Federal Yugoslavia with Tito as the Prime Minister on 7 March 1945.

During the war, the KPJ added new organisations based on foreseen federal units. In 1943, it established the Communist Party of Macedonia (Комунистичка партија на Македонија) and, in the final days of the war in May 1945, the KPJ founded the Communist Party of Serbia (Komunistička partija Srbije, Комунистичка партија Србије). By the end of the war, the KPJ's membership reached just over 141,000.

== Post-war consolidation of power ==
=== Drift to the one-party system ===
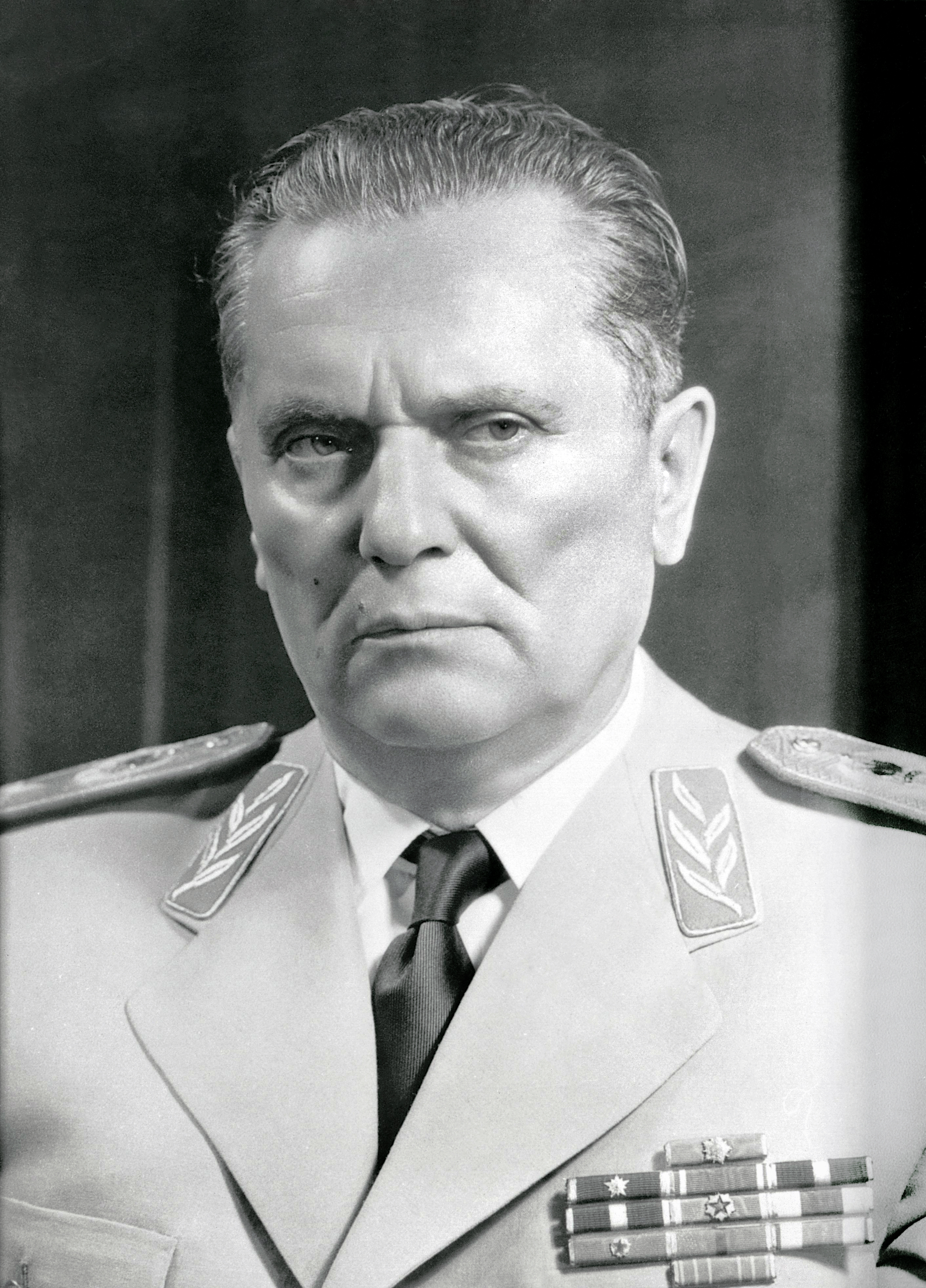
Josip Broz Tito led the Communist Party / League of Communists of Yugoslavia from the late 1930s until his death in 1980.

In 1945, the KPJ worked to broaden its support, and discredit its political opponents. Since the politicians included in the government-in-exile only returned to Yugoslavia in March 1945, and Vladko Maček remained abroad, there was no well-organised political opposition to the KPJ. The People's Front of Yugoslavia (Narodni front Jugoslavije, NFJ) was established in autumn of 1945, nominally a coalition of nearly all political parties in the country. A notable exception was Milan Grol's Democratic Party which was charged with the Serbian nationalism. Besides the KPJ, the NFJ included weak and poorly organised bourgeois parties: the Yugoslav Republican Party, the Independent Democratic Party, the Agriculturalist's Union, the Socialist Party, the JSDS, the Croatian Republican Peasant Party (Hrvatska republikanska seljačka stranka, HRSS), and a group of politicians organised as the Forward (Napred) group. While non-communist parties in the NFJ hoped for equality, Tito primary saw the NFJ as a tool for neutralization of political opposition by allying them with the KPJ. Due to weakness of the non-communist parties in the NFJ, the KPJ dominated the group.

In preparation of the 1945 elections, the AVNOJ was expanded by addition of pre-war members of parliament deemed not compromised by cooperation with the Axis powers. In effect, this meant the addition of liberal and left-leaning politicians who could not be accused of collaborating with the Axis. Civil rights were curbed in the summer of 1945 when new legislation on crimes against the people and the state, curtailing the rights of assembly and freedom of the press. Middle and lower levels of bureaucracy were filled with the ranks of former Partisans.

Following a boycott proclamation by the Grol's Democrats, the elections were carried out like a referendum–voting for the NFJ and against it. The NFJ slate received the highest approval in Croatia where the HRSS was aligned with the KPJ (81%), followed by Slovenia (78%) despite non-participation by the pre-war parties in the NFJ slate there, and the lowest support in Serbia (67%). This result is attributed to monarchism and the boycott. Ultimately, 88,43% of the electorate voted, and the NFJ was supported by 88,69% of the votes cast. The suffrage was universal for everyone over the age of 18 (including women for the first time), except those charged with Axis collaboration. Former Partisans could vote even if under 18. The KPJ received 404 representatives of 524 (77%) in the bicameral Constituent Assembly.

According to Đilas and Vladimir Velebit, the KPJ expected to win a majority of 60–65% even if the election were to guarantee fair competition. They based the opinion on the belief that the KPJ offered the opportunity to live in peace, an agrarian reform, and on post-war euphoria. In 1946, the parliament adopted a new Constitution implementing the ethnic federalism as the KPJ's solution for the national question, modelled on the Soviet Union. By 1947, the KPJ declared that its programme was the NFJ's programme and that the KPJ is in the forefront of the NFJ. Tito linked the collapse of the pre-war Yugoslavia with the multi-party system of government, justifying suppression of political opposition parties in the post-war context–calling the multi-party system incompatible with the socialist order and unnecessary. In October 1948, the four existing republican communist parties were complemented by two more: the Communist Party of Bosnia and Herzegovina, and the Communist Party of Montenegro.

=== Break with the Soviet Union ===
Objectives of the Soviet foreign policy gradually brought the USSR in conflict with the KPJ. Their relationship was complicated as the KPJ led armed resistance against the Axis while the Soviet foreign relations were initially constrained by provisions of the Molotov–Ribbentrop Pact, and then with alliance with the Western Allies who supported the Yugoslav government-in exile until shortly after the initial Tito–Šubašić Agreement. As Yugoslavia was not fully in the Soviet post-war sphere of influence, Tito pursued a foreign policy course seeking to integrate Albania into the Yugoslav federation, support the Greek communist guerrillas, and broaden ties between Yugoslavia and Bulgaria–potentially unifying the countries. Conclusion of the 1947 Bled Agreement seeking closer ties with Bulgaria, and imminent deployment of Yugoslav Army to Albania prompted a political confrontation with the USSR. The clash culminated in the Tito–Stalin split and the KPJ was expelled from the Cominform in 1948. For political reasons, the rift was presented as ideological rather than geopolitical one. The KPJ initially reacted to Stalin's criticism by adopting corrective measures in the field of collectivisation described as more Stalinist than those employed by Stalin himself.

The KPJ saw purges of real or perceived Stalin supporters and other political opponents of the regime. In 1948–1951 period, more than 50,000 KPJ members (nearly 20% of its membership) were registered as political opponents and ejected, but the party expanded its ranks by more than half a million members in the same time frame. Virtually all parties within the NFJ or otherwise were dismantled following the Stalin letters in which the Soviet leader accused the KPJ of being diluted by the NFJ. The only exception was the HRSS, which was temporarily allowed to continue operating. The exact number of those arrested remains uncertain, but in 1983, Radovan Radonjić stated that 16,288 were arrested and convicted, including 2,616 belonging to various levels of the KPJ leadership. According to Ranković, 51,000 people were killed, imprisoned or sentence to forced labour, a majority of them without trial. Prisoners were held at numerous sites, including a special-purpose prison camp built on the uninhabited Adriatic islands of Goli Otok and Sveti Grgur in 1949.

In view of the circumstances and the ideological aspect of the Yugoslav–Soviet split, the KPJ found it necessary to differentiate the Yugoslav political system from the Soviet one. Since the KPJ labelled the USSR undemocratic, it was necessary to devise and highlight KPJ's innovative approach to communist rule. This was pursued through workers' self-management legislation introduced in 1950, as well as through opposition to Stalinism and inter-war Yugoslav unitarism. The approach led to a period of ideological revisionism in which established doctrines could be questioned.

=== Reform and conflict with Đilas ===
Even though Soviet and Cominform propaganda drew attention to inequalities in the economic development of various parts of Yugoslavia, alleging restoration of capitalism, and national oppression of the underdeveloped nations, the clash between strict centralisation and decentralisation appeared as a conflict between political principle and economic priorities. In 1950, Yugoslav authorities sought to combat unsustainable labour practices and improve production efficiency through introduction of workers' councils and the system which later became known as "socialist self-management".

However, the 1946 Yugoslav constitution followed the model of the Soviet federation in which the federal parliament legislates laws applicable to the federal units and has the power to overrule the units' legislation. In 1952, Kardelj drafted constitutional amendments to reflect the reality of the reforms of 1950–1951. This led to codification of the reforms as 1953 Yugoslav constitutional amendments seeking to reflect the economic power of each constituent republic, while ensuring equal representation of each federal unit in the assembly to counterbalance this.

The KPJ proclaimed shift from party monopolising power to the ideological leader of the society, decentralised its structure, and rebranded itself (and correspondingly its republican organisations) as the League of Communists of Yugoslavia (Savez komunista Jugoslavije, SKJ) at its sixth congress held in Zagreb in 1952. The name was inspired by the 1847–1852 Communist League founded by Marx, Engels and Schapper. The constitutional amendments, adopted in January 1953, were only the second step in a series of five constitutional reforms reflecting the social development of Communist-ruled Yugoslavia, but the principles introduced in 1953 were retained in all subsequent Yugoslav constitutions.

After the Yugoslav rapprochement with the USSR, Đilas feared Yugoslavia would switch to full control of the society by the central government. He thought that was possible due to influence of Ranković–the Đilas's primary competitor as a potential successor to Tito. Đilas wrote a series of articles for Borba criticising bureaucratism and Communist exclusive claim to power. He took the criticism further in a compilation of essays, accusing the KPJ of elitism and enjoying privileges. In response, Đilas was removed from the KPJ central committee in January 1954 and soon he left the party altogether. In a subsequent The New York Times interview, he called for a multi-party system in Yugoslavia – and this led to his imprisonment. Đilas was pardoned in 1966.

=== Yugoslavism campaign ===
At the 7th Congress of the SKJ held in 1958, the party became more centralised. This was achieved by largely revoking decision-making powers previously given to republican branches of the SKJ. The party programme published at the Congress praised emerging Yugoslav consciousness and a series of articles was published advocating creation of unified Yugoslav culture. This decision built on introduction of the option of declaring one's ethnicity as Yugoslav in the 1953 census, and the régime-sponsored 1954 Novi Sad Agreement on the single Serbo-Croatian language. Thus launched Yugoslavism campaign sought to replace federalism with unitarism. Ranković became the most prominent advocate of the campaign. He sought support from the League of Communists of Bosnia and Herzegovina (Savez komunista Bosne i Hercegovine, SKBiH) and from the League of Communists of Montenegro (Savez komunista Crne Gore, SKCG) – with some success in the latter. In 1963, Serbia and Montenegro concluded several agreements on strengthening economic and cultural ties, including construction of the Belgrade–Bar railway.

The campaign was publicly criticised through an exchange of letters published in Borba. The proponents of the campaign, largely ethnic Serbs, were accused of scheming to abolish republics and resurrect Greater Serbian chauvinism. Particular opposition came from the League of Communists of Croatia (Savez komunista Hrvatske, SKH) and the League of Communists of Macedonia (Сојуз на комунистите на Македонија, SKM). They were joined in an informal national-reformist coalition by the League of Communists of Slovenia (Zveza komunistov Slovenije, ZKS) and, in a less prominent role, by the leadership of Vojvodina. In early 1963, Tito was compelled to publicly warn about chauvinism and reassure non-Serbs that merger of nations was not contemplated while defending the concept of Yugoslavism. Finally, at the 8th Congress of the SKJ held in 1964, Tito and Kardelj gave speeches criticising those thinking about merging nations of Yugoslavia as proponents of bureaucratic centralisation, unitarism and hegemony. There was no further mention of Yugoslavism at the Congress and the republican branches of the SKJ were given back their decision-making powers to reflect specificities and national character of the republics. The 8th Congress thus abandoned Yugoslavism in favour of decentralisation.

The SKJ promoted the notion of "Yugoslav socialist patriotism". The concept was described by its advocates as the feeling or awareness and love of the socialist self-management community. According to the SKJ, the concept was unrelated to nationalism and ethnicity. The notion was also claimed to support values and traditions of ethnic groups living in Yugoslavia.

== Rise and fall of "liberalism" ==
=== Political factories ===
The 1950s workers' self-management-based reforms created a distorted socialist market economy where prices were regulated, and regulations often changed. The policy allowed municipal-level authorities to establish and protect enterprises against market forces. Tito said that those enterprises, dubbed "political factories", were only capable of producing losses. They competed for funding provided by federal investment funds – often through lobbying by republican-level officials - making the republics compete for limited resources.

In 1958, a miners' strike in Trbovlje fed into overall discontent in Slovenia regarding Yugoslav economic policy, and especially the management of federal investment funds. The event marked the first sign of growing divisions over economic development of the country and the political framework of the economic system. By 1961–62, the Yugoslav economy was in recession. The situation prompted small-scale economic reforms, which were quickly cancelled thereafter but led to a debate on economic issues. The debate coincided with adoption of the 1963 constitution expanding powers of the republics, and the 8th SKJ Congress expanding powers of the SKJ branches in 1964.

As a form of concession to the conservative factions within the SKJ, two new offices were created under the new constitution, taken by Ranković and Petar Stambolić. The former became the Vice-President, and the latter the federal Prime Minister - as the position was separated from that of the President.

=== Competing economic models ===
Republican leaderships advocated different economic development models. The ZKS in Slovenia and the SKH in Croatia favoured decentralisation and reduction of investment subsidies, and criticised the so-called political factories in Bosnia and Herzegovina and in Kosovo. The SKM leadership in Macedonia favoured decentralisation because they feared Serbian domination more than the loss of federal funding.

Author Sabrina Ramet described the competing factions in the SKJ at the federal and republican levels in the 1962–87 period as "liberals" and "conservatives," based on whether they supported or opposed calls for decentralisation. Those holding the middle ground were termed "brokers" and included Tito, Bakarić, and Stambolić.

An opposing camp was formed by the League of Communists of Serbia (Savez komunista Srbije, SKS), the SKBiH in Bosnia and Herzegovina, and the SKCG in Montenegro, who advocated continuing existing economic practices. In March 1966, the reformist group prevailed in the central committee of the SKJ, which supported economic reforms.

These coalitions varied as particular interests shifted. By the end of the decade, Vojvodina no longer supported Croatian and Slovenian positions, but on the other hand the SKCG in Montenegro was no longer in full alignment with the Serbian SKS, while Croatia's SKH sought support from Kosovo's communists.

The reform debate was initially confined to economists, but by 1964 it was taken up in political forums and media, where opposing factions accused each other of exploiting one another. These allegations built upon mutual resentments. Non-Serb population saw Serbs (and Montenegrins) as overrepresented at all levels of federal SKJ offices, in the security services, and in the Yugoslav People's Army (JNA) officer corps.

In addition, the growing development gap between Slovenia, Croatia, and Vojvodina on one hand and the rest of the country on the other was also a source of tensions. According to US consul to Zagreb, Helene Batjer, during the mid-1960s nationalism had increased as the result of years of economic austerity, political oppression, unprofitable investments in underdeveloped regions, and the failure of political leaders to deliver on their promises. It was also a form of protest against the dominant role of federal officials who were generally considered in Slovenia and Croatia to represent Serbia's interests. According to Batjer, about 50% of members of ZKS in Slovenia and SKH in Croatia espoused nationalist views by then.

In 1965, the pro-reform campaign was presented as a push against inefficient economic practices. It led to a transfer of economic authority from the federal level to the republics, and to the abolition of the federally controlled general investment fund. Its assets were transferred to three federal Belgrade-based banks, while the republican-level communist party officials increased their influence over economies of their respective republics.

Membership by Nationality (late 1960s)
Nationality	Total members	Percent of membership	Percent of total population
Serb	541,526	51.77	42.08
Croat	189,605	18.13	23.15
Slovene	70,516	6.74	8.57
Macedonian	67,603	6.46	5.64
Montenegrin	65,986	6.31	2.77
Muslim	37,433	3.58	5.24
Albanian	31,780	3.04	4.93
Hungarian	12,683	1.21	2.72
Others	28,886	2.76	4.90
Total	1,046,018	100.00	100.00

=== Ranković affair ===
By early 1966, it was evident that the economic reform did not produce the desired results. The SKJ discussed the failure and blamed the Serbian leadership for resistance to the reform. In the spring of 1966, Kardelj persuaded Tito to remove Aleksandar Ranković from the SKJ central committee and the position of the vice president of Yugoslavia. He was accused of plotting to seize power disregarding the decisions of the 8th Congress of the SKJ on decentralisation, and abuse of the State Security Administration directly or through allies. Specifically, he was accused of illegally wire-tapping SKJ leadership, including Tito.

The investigation of the Ranković affair was handled by a six-member commission with one member drawn from each republic. It was chaired by Krste Crvenkovski (Macedonia) and its members were Đuro Pucar (Bosnia), Blažo Jovanović (Montenegro), Dobrivoje Radosavljević (Serbia), Miko Tripalo (Croatia), and France Popit (Slovenia). Even though they were not members of the commission, the investigation was directed by Kardelj, Bakarić, and Stambolić who controlled the commission through influence exerted on its members. Ranković was not informed of the accusations and the investigation until shortly before the plenum held on Brijuni Islands on 1 July 1966.

Ranković was eventually removed from all his offices and expelled from the central committee. His allies and successors as federal ministers of the interior, Svetislav Stefanović and Vojin Lukić, were also dismissed and expelled from the SKJ. On the initiative of SKJ's Kosovo organisation, supported by the SKCG, the SKBiH, and the SKM, Ranković was also expelled from the SKJ. Even though the SKJ took care to replace Ranković in all his former federal posts with ethnic Serbs, his ouster was perceived in Serbia and elsewhere in Yugoslavia as a Serbian defeat or even humiliation, resulting in Serb resentment.

Shortly after the fall of Ranković, the SKM of Macedonia called for political reforms. They proposed even greater decentralisation of the SKJ and giving veto powers to republican branches at federal-level decision-making by the SKJ. The plan was opposed by the SKS in Serbia but was supported to various degrees by others. While the debate was ongoing, the SKS leadership was replaced by reformist-leaning anti-nationalists Marko Nikezić and Latinka Perović who were made president of the central committee and the secretary of the executive committee respectively.

While Nikezić and Perović did not support the economic aspects of the reform advocated by the SKH in Croatia, they welcomed the call for greater liberalisation of media and politics. In 1969, the 9th Congress remained silent on the veto rights, but granted the branches the right to appoint federal-level officials and adopt their own statutes.

Provincial SKJ organisations in Kosovo and Vojvodina were raised to the level of provincial communist parties in 1968. Thus were formed the League of Communists of Vojvodina (Savez komunista Vojvodine, SKV) and the League of Communists of Kosovo (Savez komunista Kosova, SKK), which were simultaneously part of the Serbian SKS and the federal SKJ. This left only the party organisation in the JNA under direct control of the federal-level SKJ.

=== Croatian Spring and purge of reformists ===
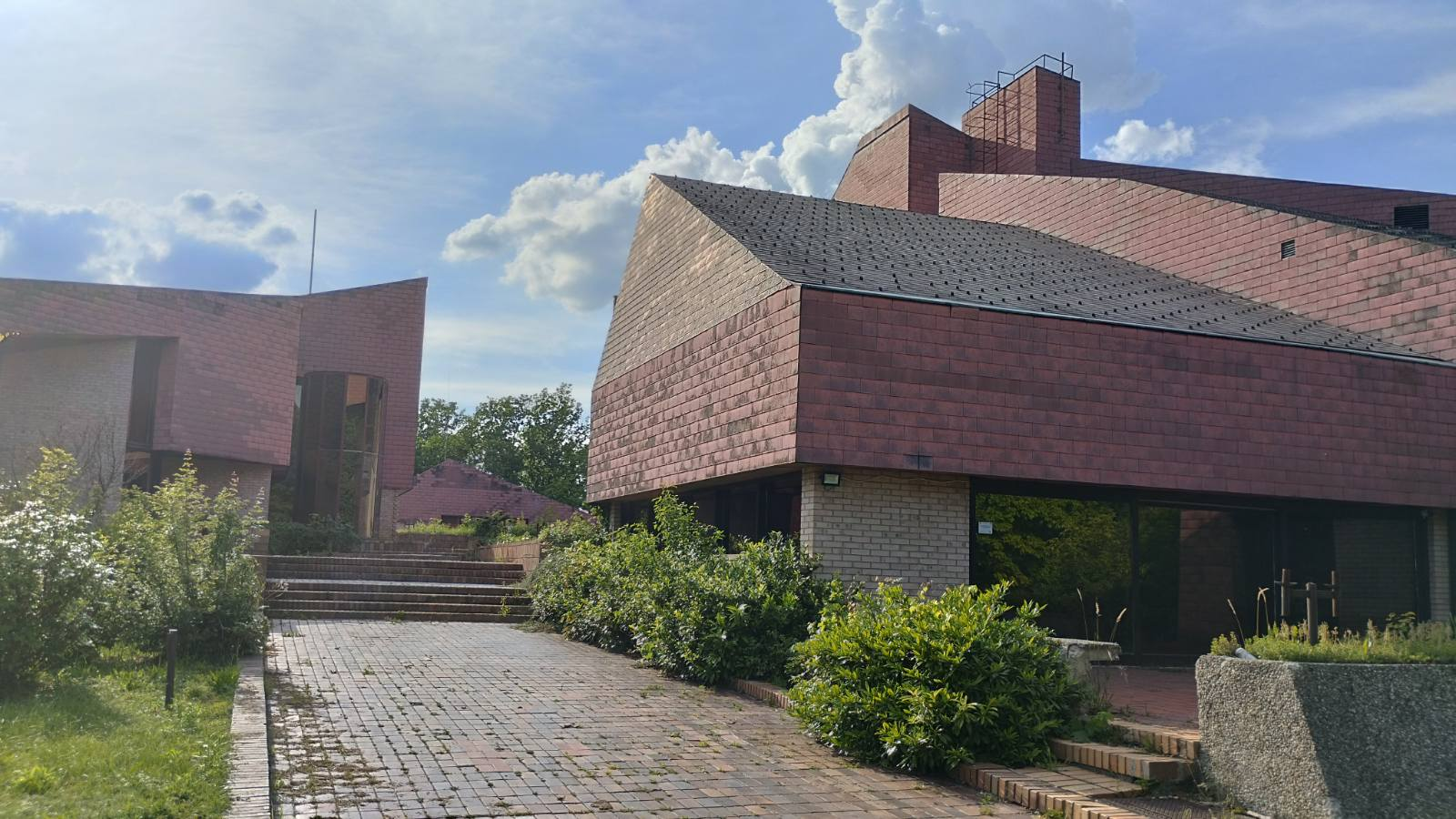
Former communist party political school in Kumrovec - Tito's birthplace.

In the atmosphere of the inter-republican disagreement on reform of banking and trade, the conflict assumed increasingly nationalist rhetoric. In 1967 and 1968, the Yugoslav constitution was amended once again, further reducing federal authority in favour of the constituent republics. The reformist forces grew in November 1968 when Marko Nikezić and Latinka Perović took helm of the SKS and advocated development through introduction of market economy practices and non-interference in other republics' affairs. The 9th Congress of the SKJ was held in March 1969, marking the peak of the reformist coalition. It pushed for decentralisation of all aspects of society. In the late 1960s, the relations between Slovenia's ZKS and Croatia's SKH became more strained, but the SKH and the Macedonian SKM successfully pressured the federal SKJ to adopt the principle of unanimity in decision-making, thus obtaining veto power for the republican branches of the SKJ in April 1970.

In the late 1960s, Croatia saw a resurgence of the national sentiment and Croatian nationalism in the form of Croatian Spring primarily through the cultural organisation Matica hrvatska, in response to instances of actual or perceived Serbian dominance. The SKH had no official position regarding Matica hrvatska until late 1969 or early 1970. Then a reformist faction of the SKH led by Savka Dabčević-Kučar and Miko Tripalo gained control of the party and aligned themselves with Matica hrvatska to secure wider support in an intra-SKH power-struggle with a conservative faction.

For the SKH, grievances included economic issues such as rate of retention of hard currency earnings by Croatia-based companies, but the complaints were expanded to include various political demands seeking increased autonomy and opposition to over-representation of ethnic Serbs in security services, politics, and elsewhere. A particular point of contention was the matter of distinguishing Croatian language from Serbo-Croatian.

On 1 December 1971, Tito convened the 21st session of the SKJ presidium as a joint meeting with the SKH leaders where the SKH leadership was roundly criticised and told to regain control over nationalists. Within days, Dabčević-Kučar and Tripalo resigned, and tens of thousands of members were expelled from the SKH. Even as thousands were persecuted for political crimes, Tito sought to undercut nationalist support by granting economic reform demands.

In January 1972, the SKJ adopted a programme of an ongoing fight against nationalism. In the process, reformist forces were targeted – Stane Kavčič was forced to resign in Slovenia, and the SKM faction of Krste Crvenkovski was ousted in Macedonia. In Serbia, Marko Nikezić, Latinka Perović, Mirko Tepavac and Bora Pavlović were accused of liberalism, particularly with their refusal to condemn the Croatian Spring, reconcilability with public critique of federal centralisation and requests to weaken SKJ's party monopoly, as well as advocacy of democratic reforms of the socialist self-management in the country, and were forced to resign, while Koča Popović retired out of solidarity with purged members of the party. Their replacements were obedient but mediocre politicians.

Namely, 1971 constitutional amendments transferred significant powers away from the federation to the republics, and the new constitution adopted in 1974 preserved the 1971 reforms nearly completely. It even expanded republican economic powers by putting into law the reformist demands in the sectors of banking, commerce, and foreign currency. The purges of early 1970s drove many reformist communists and the social-democratic-minded away from politics in the final decades of Yugoslavia.

== Decline and dissolution ==
After Tito's death in 1980 the party adopted a collective leadership model, with the party presidency rotating annually. The party's influence declined and the party moved to a federal structure giving more power to party branches in Yugoslavia's constituent republics. Party membership continued to grow reaching two million in the mid-1980s but membership was considered less prestigious than in the past.

Slobodan Milošević became President of the League of Communists of Serbia in 1987 and combined certain Serbian nationalist ideologies with opposition to liberal reforms. The growing rift among the branches of the Communist Party and their respective republics came to a head at the SKJ's 14th Congress, held in January 1990. The SKJ renounced its monopoly of power and agreed to allow opposition parties to take part in elections. However, rifts between Serbian and Slovenian Communists led the SKJ to dissolve into different parties for each republic.

On 22 January 1991, the Committee for the Preparation of the Democratic and Programmatic Renewal—the last federal organ of the LCY—abolished itself and on 24 February 1991, the last party branch, the League of Communists of Bosnia and Herzegovina, left the LCY and became an independent party.

The Communist associations in each republic soon adopted the "socialist" or "social-democratic" monikers, transforming into movements which were left-oriented, but no longer strictly communist.

- the League of Communists of Serbia (SKS) became the Socialist Party of Serbia (SPS) in July 1990
- the League of Communists of Slovenia (ZKS) became the Party of Democratic Reforms of Slovenia in February 1990 (which merged in 1993 with several smaller parties to form the United List of Social Democrats, which in 2005 adopted their present-day form of Social Democrats)
- the League of Communists of Croatia (SKH) became the Party of Democratic Changes (SDP) in November 1990 (which later merged with the much smaller Social Democrats of Croatia in 1994 and was renamed Social Democratic Party)
- the League of Communists of Macedonia (SKM) became the Social Democratic Union of Macedonia (SDSM) in April 1991
- the League of Communists of Montenegro (SKCG) became the Democratic Party of Socialists of Montenegro (DPS) in June 1991
- the League of Communists of Bosnia and Herzegovina (SKBiH) became the Social Democratic Party of Bosnia and Herzegovina (SDP BiH) in December 1992
- the League of Communists Organisation in the Yugoslav People's Army (SKJ–JNA) became the League of Communists – Movement for Yugoslavia (SK–PJ) in November 1990 (which later succeeded by the Yugoslav Left)
- the centre-left faction of the League of Communists of Yugoslavia (SKJ) became the Union of Reform Forces of Yugoslavia (SRSJ) in July 1990 (which later succeeded by many liberal parties in former republics of Yugoslavia)
- the League of Communists of Vojvodina (SKV) became the League of Social Democrats of Vojvodina (LSV) and the Provincial Committee of the Socialist Party of Serbia for Vojvodina in July 1990
- the League of Communists of Kosovo (SKK/LKK) formally became the Provincial Committee of the Socialist Party of Serbia for Kosovo and Metohija in July 1990, while the majority of its Albanian members, who had been purged in 1988, founded the Social Democratic Party of Kosovo (PSDK)

== See also ==
- President of the League of Communists of Yugoslavia – list of party leaders
- League of Communist Youth of Yugoslavia – youth organization until 1948
- League of Socialist Youth of Yugoslavia – youth organization from 1948
- Praxis School — a Marxist humanist movement critical of implemented self-management
