= Anton Novačan =

Slovene politician, diplomat, author and playwright

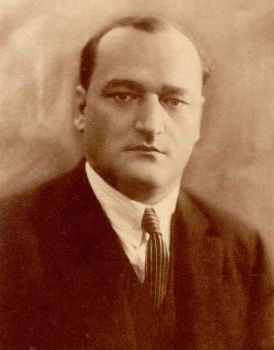
- Anton Novačan in 1927
- Born: July 7, 1887; Zadobrova, Austro-Hungarian Empire (now Celje, Slovenia)
- Died: March 22, 1951; Posadas, Argentina
- Education: Charles University, Prague (Law)
- Occupations: Politician, diplomat, author, playwright
- Known for: Founding the Slovenian Republican Party; diplomatic service; literary contributions
- Notable work: Herman Celjski (1920s), Peti evangelij (1945–1948)
- Political party: Slovenian Republican Party (1922–1923)

Anton Novačan (July 7, 1887 – March 22, 1951) was a Slovene politician, diplomat, author, and playwright.

Novačan was born into a modest peasant family in the village of Zadobrova (now part of the Lower Styrian town of Celje), in the Austro-Hungarian Empire. He attended the First Celje Grammar School and later went to school in the Croatian towns of Zagreb, Karlovac, and Varaždin. In Croatia, he met several young poets, such as Ivan Novak and Ljubo Wiesner, with whom he established a close friendship. During this period, he also contributed to many Croatian literary magazines. In 1908, he enrolled at the Charles University in Prague, where he studied law. Between 1910 and 1913, he spent three years traveling around Europe, spending much time in Paris, Munich, and Moscow. During World War I, he was imprisoned by the Austro-Hungarian authorities as a potentially dangerous political radical. He finished his studies in 1918, and moved back to Slovenia, which had just become part of the Kingdom of Serbs, Croats and Slovenes.

In the early 1920s, Novačan became politically active. In 1921, he founded the Slovenian section of the Agrarian Party, which already the following year became independent under the name Slovenian Republican Party with Novačan as its chairman. The party advocated the establishment of an autonomous Slovenian Free State within a confederation of South Slavic peoples, which would include Yugoslavia and Bulgaria. They opposed clericalism and social conservativism and promoted agrarian ideals based on the Catholic values of the Slovene peasant population. In the parliamentary elections of 1923, the party suffered a devastating defeat and dissolved itself soon afterward. According to his own testimony, Novačan asked for an audience with King Alexander I of Yugoslavia, where he promised the monarch that he would dissolve the party and become a monarchist if he were accepted into the diplomatic service of the Kingdom. Novačan thus became a consul in Warsaw, Brăila, Cairo, Bari, and Klagenfurt.

During all this period, he continued to write prose and poems, many of which were published in the literary magazine Ljubljanski zvon. In the late 1920s, he published his best-known work, the play Herman Celjski ("Hermann of Cilli"), based on the story of the Renaissance Styrian nobleman Hermann II of Cilli, whom Novačan portrayed as a Nietzschean Übermensch in tragic conflict with his environment.

In the 1930s, he moved to Belgrade, where he worked as a freelance writer and journalist. There he also met many Slovenes living in the Yugoslav capital, among them the writer Vladimir Bartol, with whom he developed a close friendship, Ivan Marija Čok, leader of the Slovene and Croatian political exiles from the Julian March, and Albert Rejec, unofficial leader and ideologue of the militant anti-fascist organization TIGR. After the Axis invasion of Yugoslavia in April 1941, he managed to escape to Jerusalem. After a short period of British internment, he joined the Yugoslav Government in exile stationed in Cairo, Egypt, where he worked as a clerk in the diplomatic office.

After the end of World War II in 1945, he moved to Trieste, where he wrote his most important poetic work, Peti evangelij ("The Fifth Gospel"), a cycle of 240 sonnets. In Trieste, he met Vladimir Bartol, who tried to convince him to return to Yugoslavia. However, Novačan rejected the Communist ideology of the new Titoist regime and in 1948 he chose to emigrate to Argentina with the help of Miha Krek, Ivan Ahčin, and Ciril Kotnik. He settled in Buenos Aires, where he met the Slovene Roman Catholic intellectual Tine Debeljak, who introduced Novačan to the local community of Slovene immigrants.

He died in the Argentine city of Posadas in 1951.
