= Corfu Declaration =

1917 manifesto on unification of South Slavs

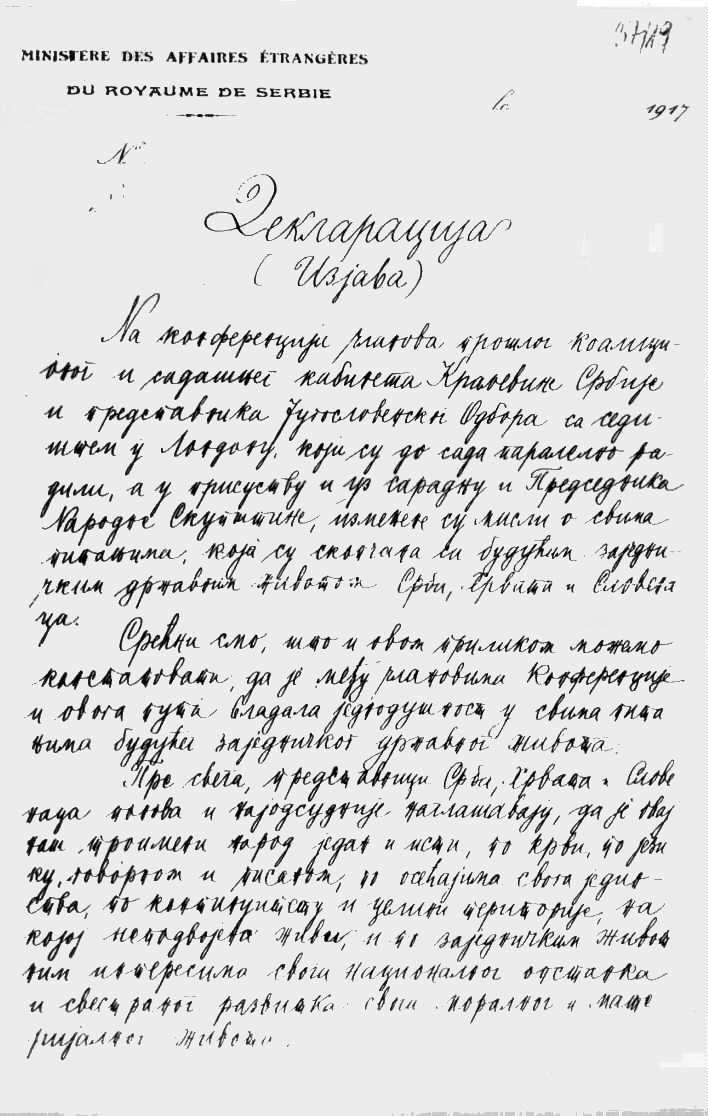
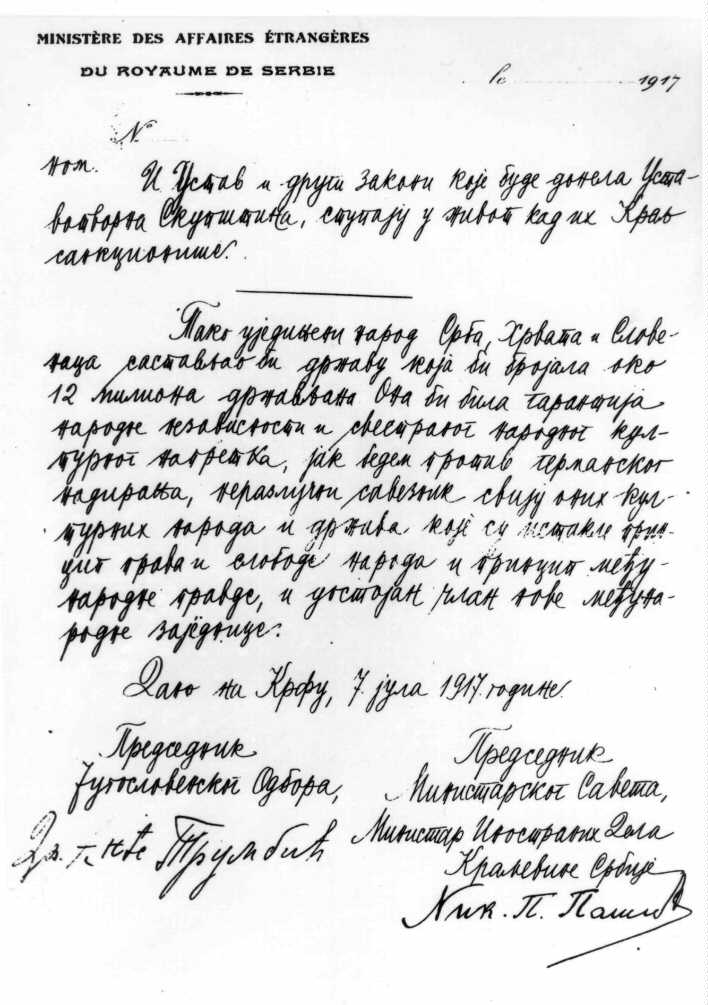
- The Corfu Declaration
- Created: 20 July 1917
- Location: Corfu, Kingdom of Greece
- Author(s): Nikola Pašić and Ante Trumbić
- Signatories: Nikola Pašić for the Kingdom of Serbia and Ante Trumbić for the Yugoslav Committee

The Corfu Declaration (Serbo-Croatian: Krfska deklaracija, Крфска декларација) was an agreement between the prime minister of Serbia, Nikola Pašić, and the president of the Yugoslav Committee, Ante Trumbić, concluded on the Greek island of Corfu on 20 July 1917. Its purpose was to establish the method of unifying a future common state of the South Slavs living in Serbia, Montenegro and Austria-Hungary after the First World War. Russia's decision to withdraw diplomatic support for Serbia following the February Revolution, as well as the Yugoslav Committee's sidelining by the trialist reform initiatives launched in Austria-Hungary, motivated both sides to attempt to reach an agreement.

Pašić and Trumbić's positions were disparate. Pašić advocated for a centralist government, while Trumbić argued for a federal state, leaving significant powers to federal units and safeguarding national rights. The resulting declaration glossed over the matter of the system of government. As a compromise, it specified only that the common Kingdom of Serbs, Croats and Slovenes would be a constitutional monarchy ruled by the currently reigning Serbian Karađorđević dynasty, deferring most questions to a future Constitutional Assembly. During the discussions, which lasted 35 days, Trumbić had little support for his view from the other members of the Yugoslav Committee, who were preoccupied with the threat posed by Italy, which had been promised territory under the 1915 Treaty of London.

== Background ==
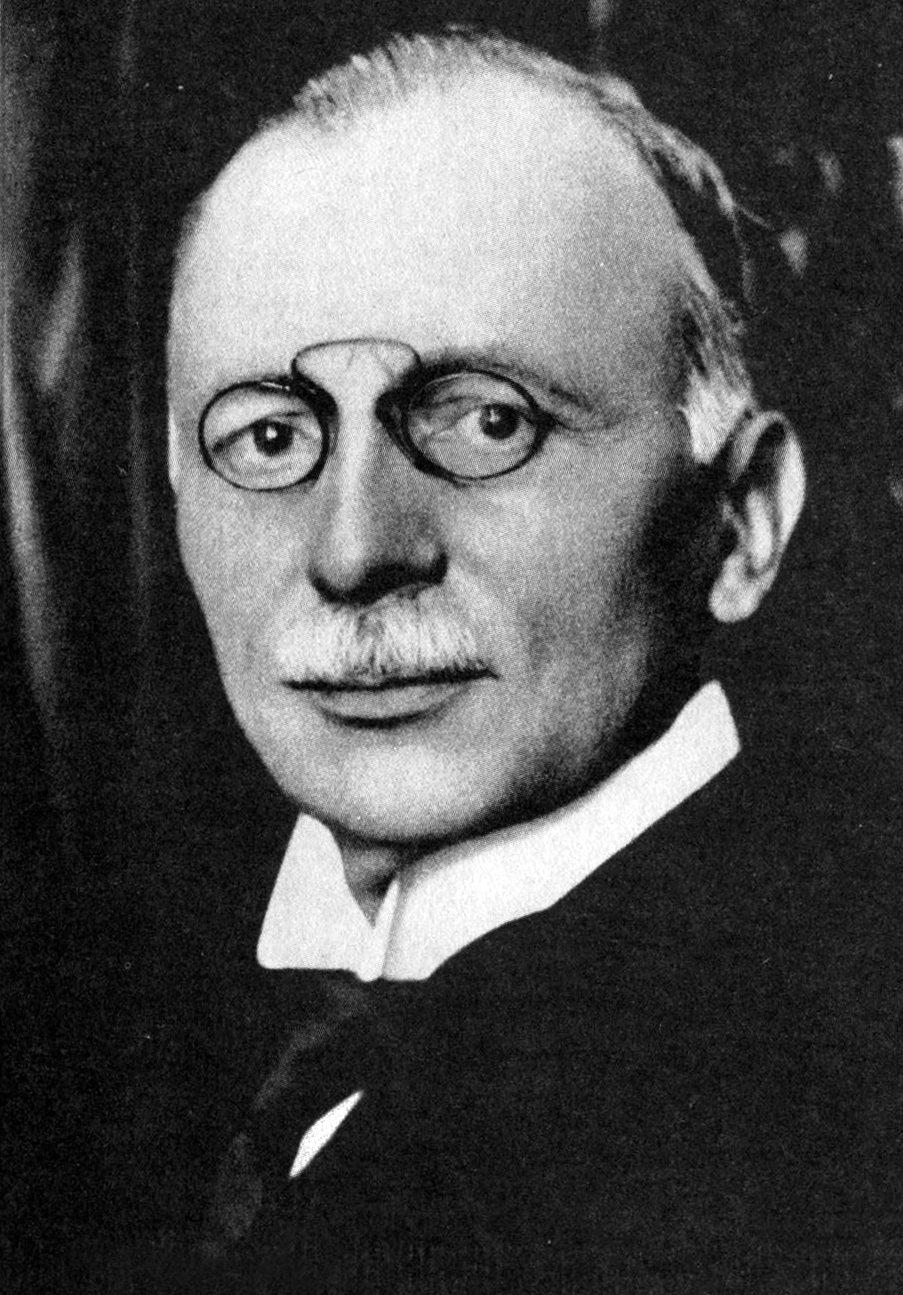
Ante Trumbić led the Yugoslav Committee in the run-up to the creation of Yugoslavia.

During the First World War, pressure developed in the parts of Austria-Hungary inhabited by its South Slavic population – the Croats, the Serbs, the Slovenes, and the Muslim Slavs (Bosniaks) – in support of trialist reform, or the establishment of a common South Slavic state independent of the empire. This common state was meant to be achieved through the realisation of Yugoslavist ideas and unification with the Kingdom of Serbia.

Serbia considered the war an opportunity for territorial expansion. A committee tasked with determining the country's war aims produced a programme to establish a wider South Slavic state by adding the South Slav-inhabited parts of the Habsburg lands – Croatia-Slavonia, Slovene Lands, Vojvodina, Bosnia and Herzegovina, and Dalmatia – to Serbia. In its December 1914 Niš Declaration, the National Assembly of Serbia announced the struggle to liberate and unify "unliberated brothers" as its national war aim. This contravened the interests of the Triple Entente, which favoured the continued existence of Austria-Hungary as a counterweight to the influence of the German Empire. In late 1915, combined Austro-Hungarian, German and Bulgarian forces defeated and occupied Serbia, forcing its government and remaining troops to withdraw across Albania and seek refuge on the Greek island of Corfu.

In April 1915, the Yugoslav Committee was established as an ad hoc group with no official capacity. Partially funded by the Serbian government, it consisted of intellectuals and politicians from Austria-Hungary claiming to represent the interests of South Slavs. Ante Trumbić was the Committee's president, but Frano Supilo, the co-founder of the ruling Croat-Serb Coalition in Croatia-Slavonia, was its most prominent member. Supilo advocated for a federation consisting of Serbia (including Vojvodina), Croatia (encompassing Croatia-Slavonia and Dalmatia), Bosnia and Herzegovina, Slovenia and Montenegro.

On 30 May 1917, South Slavic members of the Vienna Imperial Council established the Yugoslav Club chaired by Slovene People's Party president Anton Korošec. The Yugoslav Club presented the council with the May Declaration – a manifesto demanding the unification of Habsburg land inhabited by Croats, Slovenes, and Serbs into a democratic, free and independent state under Habsburg dynastic rule. The demand was made with reference to the principles of national self-determination and Croatian state right.

== Discussions at Corfu ==
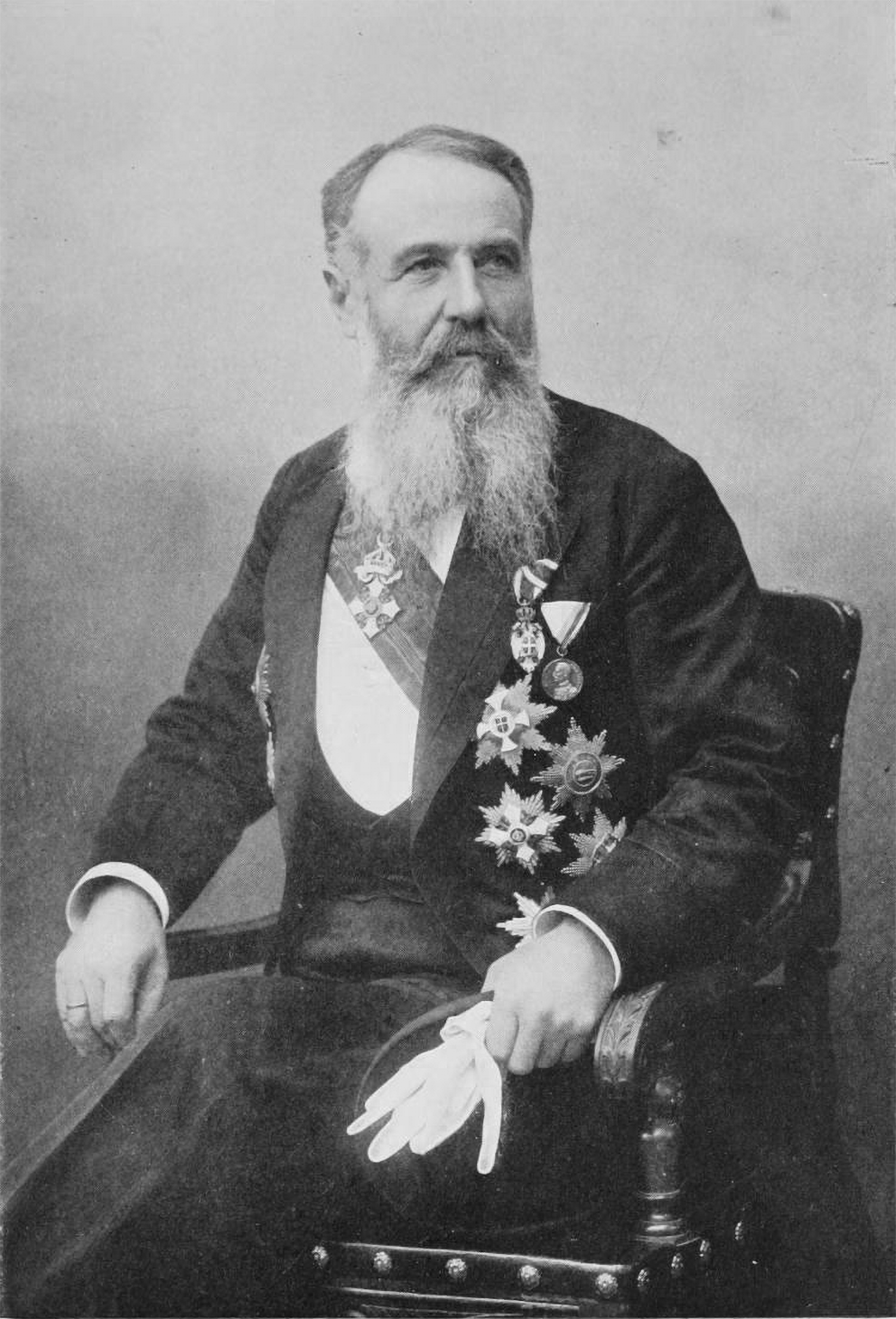
Serbian prime minister Nikola Pašić negotiated the Corfu Declaration with the Yugoslav Committee.

The May Declaration was issued while the Triple Entente was still looking for ways to achieve a separate peace with Austria-Hungary and thereby detach it from Germany. This presented a problem for the Serbian government exiled on Corfu. It increased the risk of a trialist solution for the Habsburg South Slavs if a separate peace treaty materialised, preventing the fulfillment of Serbia's war objectives. Lacking strong Russian diplomatic backing since the February Revolution, Serbian prime minister Nikola Pašić therefore felt compelled to come to an arrangement with the Yugoslav Committee.

The Yugoslav Committee was also placed under pressure. It claimed to speak on behalf of South Slavs within Austria-Hungary, but was also openly looking after its own interests. The May Declaration presented a challenge to the Yugoslav Committee and the government of Serbia by depriving them of initiative in the South Slavic unification process. This led them both to prioritise drafting a unification programme for the South Slavic lands inside and outside Austria-Hungary.

Despite being partially funded by the Serbian government, the Yugoslav Committee disagreed with it on the method of unification and the system of government. This conflict resulted from a disagreement between Pašić and Supilo. Pašić advocated a centralised government based in Belgrade, while Supilo wanted a federation and accused Pašić of championing a Greater Serbian agenda. When Pašić invited the Yugoslav Committee for talks in May 1917, Supilo warned against discussions without determining Serbian intentions first.

Committee members learned that, under the Treaty of London, the Triple Entente had promised Italy parts of Austria-Hungary's territory – sections of the Slovene Lands, Istria, and Dalmatia – to entice Italy to join the Entente. Most of the Committee members were from Dalmatia and saw the Treaty of London as a threat that could only be checked with Serbia's support, prompting them to accept Pašić's invitation to Corfu. In protest, Supilo resigned his committee membership.

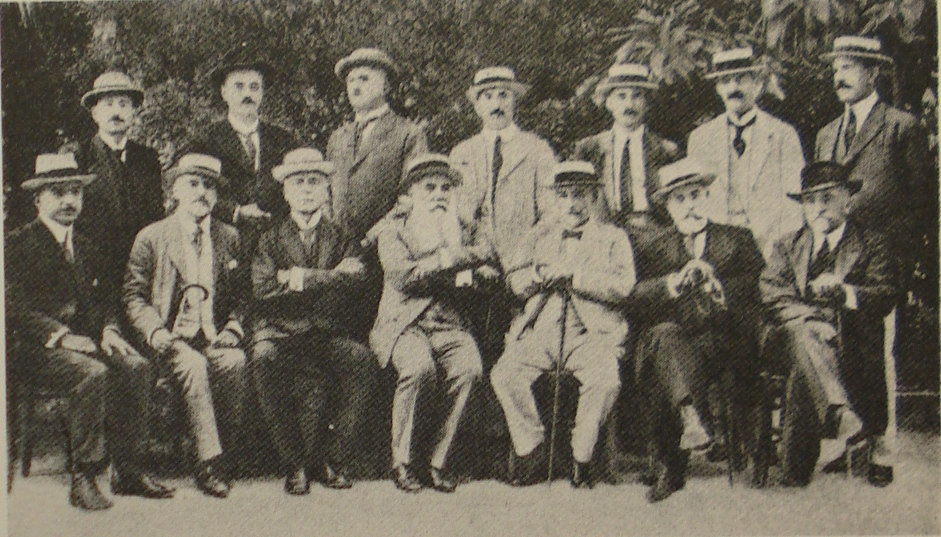
Participants of the June–July 1917 talks that resulted in the adoption of the Corfu Declaration

Despite radically different views on the system of government in the proposed common state, a series of meetings were held from 15 June to 20 July in order to reach a consensus. The negotiating parties mistrusted each other. The Yugoslav Committee based their positions on local autonomies, legal institutions, federalism and the Croatian state right, but the Serbian government considered those positions vestiges of the struggle against the "enemy" (meaning Austria-Hungary). On the other hand, Pašić touted universal suffrage and simple parliamentary democracy, interpreted by Trumbić as a way to ensure the rule of the Serbs as the most populous ethnic group in the proposed state. In response to Trumbić's demands, Pašić said that if the Croats insisted on a federation, the Serbian government would abandon the unification project in favour of the creation of Greater Serbia. After twenty-eight plenary meetings over the course of thirty-five days, differences of opinion became apparent, and no agreement on the system of government was reached. The resulting Corfu Declaration glossed over this, leaving it to the future Constituent Assembly to decide by an unspecified qualified majority – i.e. not by a simple majority vote – before being approved by the Serbian king. According to the scholar Dejan Medaković, Trumbić claimed he had to sign the Declaration as the only way for his people to be on the war's winning side.

The Declaration stated that Serbs, Croats, and Slovenes were one "tri-named" people, and that the Karađorđević dynasty would reign in the new unified state, which would be organised as a parliamentary, constitutional monarchy. Finally, the Declaration stated that the new government would respect the equality of "religion and alphabets", voting rights, and so forth. Trumbić proposed to establish a provisional government of the new state, but Pašić declined in order to avoid undermining the inherent diplomatic advantage Serbia enjoyed as an already-recognised state.

== Impact ==
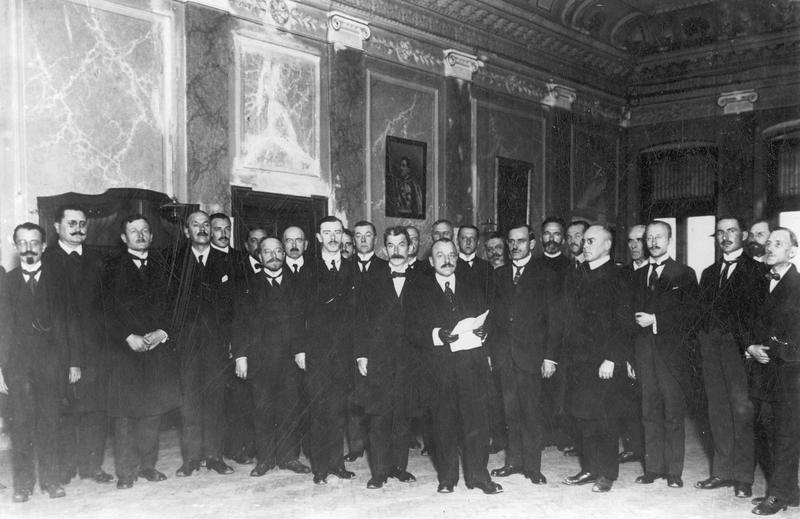
Address of the delegation of the National Council of the State of Slovenes, Croats and Serbs to the Prince Regent Alexander

In essence, the Corfu Declaration was a political manifesto disregarded by the Serbian government with respect to the qualified majority needed to adopt a constitution, but upheld when its provisions coincided with Serbian interests. Conversely, Croatian autonomist politicians deemed the provisions on the qualified majority as a binding agreement. The Declaration was a compromise by the Yugoslav Committee and the Pašić government. It was hailed as a South Slavic Magna Carta for recognising the "tribal" names, three flags and religions, and two "alphabets". At the same time, the Declaration limited the powers of the future Constituent Assembly by deciding on the monarchy and the specific ruling dynasty. It also decided the name of the future state as the Kingdom of Serbs, Croats and Slovenes – following Serbian objections against the name of "Yugoslavia" as a Western invention designed to stamp out the name "Serbia".

Trumbić was largely isolated in his opposition to the centralism championed by Pašić; most of the Yugoslav Committee sided with Pašić on the issue. While Trumbić insisted on leaving the internal affairs, education, judiciary, and economy (other than customs, currency, credit and management of state property) to federal units and asked for veto powers for the "tribes" in the Constitutional Assembly to ensure decision-making by consensus, Pašić rejected his ideas. Pašić favoured granting a degree of autonomy to local governments but advocated the abolition of historical lands in favour of new administrative units. Pašić let it be known that Croatian federalists may only exert some influence in Zagreb and its immediate surroundings and on the Adriatic islands largely claimed by Italy. The Declaration avoided most of these issues but referred to "counties and other administrative units". That was later interpreted as a break with the historical rights of the historical provinces. Similarly, the Croatian Sabor was given no role in the Declaration. The Corfu Declaration contained no institutional safeguards of national rights. According to Ivo Banac, the Yugoslav Committee chose not to insist on those matters as it was preoccupied with the Italian threat. In Italy, the Declaration was portrayed as anti-Italian in spirit, aimed at splitting Italy from its allies and diminishing the Italian contribution to the war effort. This view was specifically advocated by Fasces of Revolutionary Action Benito Mussolini. Nationalists sought to capitalise on identifying with nationalistic positions towards the Adriatic Question by presenting the Treaty of London (with addition of Fiume (Rijeka) to Italy) as a fair territorial compromise threatened by the imperialistic thinking of the Yugoslav Committee.

International support only gradually began shifting away from the preservation of Austria-Hungary in 1917. That year, Russia sued for peace following the Russian Revolution while the United States, whose president, Woodrow Wilson, advocated the principle of self-determination, entered the war. Nonetheless, in his Fourteen Points speech, Wilson only promised autonomy for the peoples of Austria-Hungary. Preservation of the dual monarchy was not abandoned before the signing of the Treaty of Brest-Litovsk in March 1918. By then, the Allies became convinced that they could not resist a Communist revolution. As Austria-Hungary disintegrated, representatives of the Serbian government and opposition, the Yugoslav Committee, and representatives of the National Council of the newly proclaimed State of Slovenes, Croats and Serbs in the former Habsburg lands, met for another round of negotiations in Geneva on 6–9 November 1918. At the conference, the Yugoslav Committee and the National Council persuaded Pašić to sign the Geneva Declaration renouncing the unitarist concept of the future union. However, the Serbian government quickly repudiated the Declaration. Pressed by the circumstances of Italian armed incursion, the National Council drew up instructions for its delegation to the Serbian prince regent Alexander, offering to proclaim the unification of the South Slavs and the creation of a new state. The instructions were drawn up by relying on the Corfu Declaration and the National Council's federalist ideas.

The delegation ignored their instructions and changed the address to Alexander from specifying a federalist system of government based on the Corfu Declaration to a display of loyalty and expression of wishes. On 1 December, Prince Regent Alexander accepted the offer to proclaim unification with no constraints imposed.

== See also ==
- Congress of Oppressed Nationalities of the Austro-Hungarian Empire

== Sources ==
- Banac, Ivo (1984). The National Question in Yugoslavia: Origins, History, Politics. Ithaca: Cornell University Press. ISBN 0-8014-1675-2.
- Bucarelli, Massimo (2019). "Mussolini and the Yugoslav Question During the First World War". In Pavlović, Vojislav G. (ed.). Serbia and Italy in the Great War. Belgrade: Institute for Balkan Studies. pp. 279–300. ISBN 978-8671791038.
- Glenny, Misha (2012). The Balkans, 1804–2012: Nationalism, War and the Great Powers. Toronto: House of Anansi Press. ISBN 978-1-77089-273-6.
- Medaković, Dejan (1997). Oči u oči [Face to Face] (in Serbian). Belgrade: Beogradski izdavačko-grafički zavod. ISBN 978-86-13-00903-0.
- Merlicco, Giordano (2021). "Between old Austria and new foes: Italy and the Yugoslav project (1917–1918)" (PDF). Istorijski Zapisi. XCIV (1–2). Podgorica: Istorijski institut Crne Gore: 115–138. ISSN 0021-2652.
- Pavlowitch, Kosta St. (2003a). "The First World War and Unification of Yugoslavia". In Djokic, Dejan (ed.). Yugoslavism: Histories of a Failed Idea, 1918–1992. London: C. Hurst & Co. pp. 27–41. ISBN 1-85065-663-0.
- Pavlowitch, Stevan K. (2003b). "Serbia, Montenegro and Yugoslavia". In Djokic, Dejan (ed.). Yugoslavism: Histories of a Failed Idea, 1918–1992. London: C. Hurst & Co. pp. 57–70. ISBN 1-85065-663-0.
- Ramet, Sabrina P. (2006). The Three Yugoslavias: State-building and Legitimation, 1918–2005. Bloomington: Indiana University Press. ISBN 978-0253346568.
- Repe, Božo (2017). "Reasons for Entering and Exiting". In Perović, Latinka; Roksandić, Drago; Velikonja, Mitja; Höpken, Wolfgang; Bieber, Florian (eds.). Yugoslavia from a Historical Perspective. Belgrade: Helsinki Committee for Human Rights in Serbia. pp. 186–219. ISBN 978-86-7208-208-1.
- Šepić, Dragovan (1968). "The Question of Yugoslav Union in 1918". Journal of Contemporary History. 3 (4). SAGE Publishing: 29–43. doi:10.1177/002200946800300403. ISSN 0022-0094. JSTOR 259849. S2CID 159110607.
