= Ciril Kotnik =

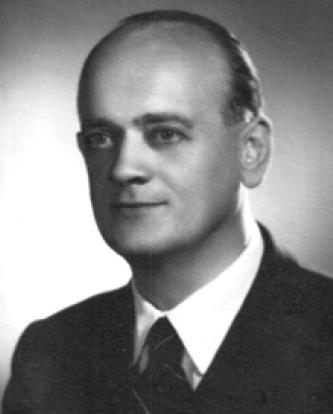
Ciril Kotnik

Ciril Kotnik (20 December 1895 – 29 June 1948) was a Yugoslav diplomat of Slovene ethnicity.

He was born in Ljubljana, then part the Austro-Hungarian Empire, to Carinthian Slovene parents. He attended the Ljubljana Classical Gymnasium, where he became a member of the radical student association Preporod ("Rebirth"), which advocated the dissolution of Austria-Hungary and the creation of a common state for all South Slavic peoples. At the outbreak of the First Balkan War in 1912, Kotnik volunteered in the Serbian army. After the war, he was awarded the Karadjordje's star, one of the highest military awards in the Kingdom of Serbia.

After the creation of the Kingdom of Serbs, Croats and Slovenes in 1918, Kotnik was included in the diplomatic service of the new state. He was sent to Rome, where he worked at the Yugoslav embassy to the Kingdom of Italy. He lived and worked in Rome for more than two decades and married a local woman, Maria Tommassetti.

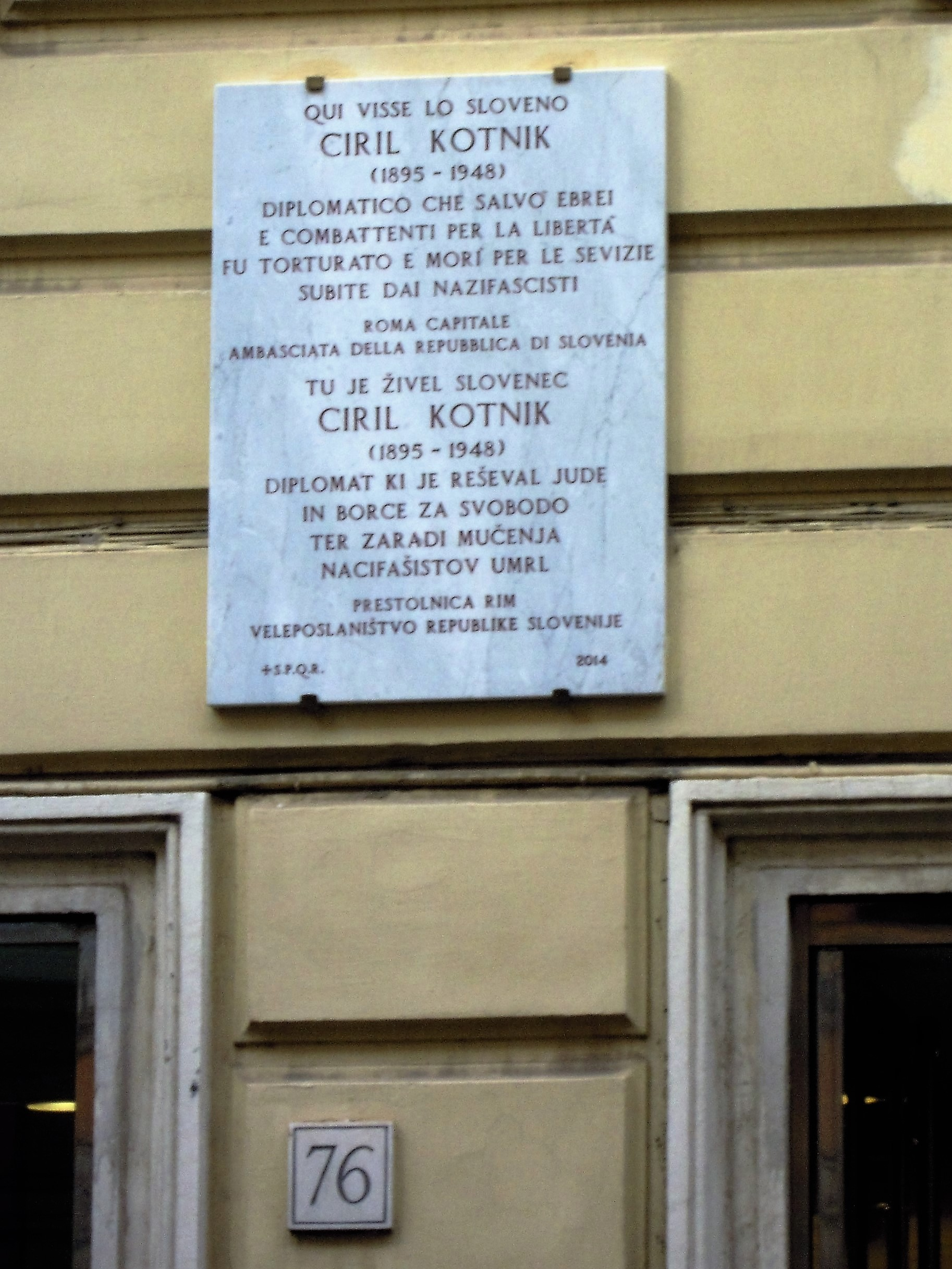
Plaque in Rome

After the Axis invasion of Yugoslavia in April 1941, the Yugoslav embassy was closed down and its personnel dismissed. Kotnik was put into house arrest in his home in Rome. At the end of 1941, the Royal Yugoslav Government-in-Exile decided to include Kotnik in the Yugoslav diplomatic delegation to the Holy See. He maintained close contacts with the Yugoslav government in London, the monarchist resistance movement of general Draža Mihajlović, but was hostile to the Communist-led Yugoslav partisans of Josip Broz Tito.

After the Italian armistice in September 1943, Kotnik took advantage of his position of ambassador to the Holy See in order to help many anti-fascists and Jews to escape Nazi German persecution. During this time, he established contacts with the political activist Janko Kralj, and Slovene emigrant from Gorizia, who also helped many anti-Nazis and Jews to escape persecution. On October 28, 1943, the Nazis arrested Kotnik and jailed him in the prison on Via Tasso. He was submitted to heavy torture, but did not reveal his sources.

After the war, he collaborated with the Slovene political emigrants Miha Krek and Ivan Ahčin in helping Slovene refugees fleeing from Socialist Yugoslavia. Kotnik died in 1948 because of the lesions suffered under torture. In 2007, members of the Jewish community of Rome proposed to erect a monument in his memory.

Ciril Kotnik was the cousin of the Slovene philologian and literary historian Franc Kotnik and of the linguist Janko Kotnik. His half-brother is the missionary Jaroslav Kotnik from Trieste. He had three daughters, including the Italian Canadian journalist Dara Kotnik Mancini and Ivanka Kotnik, mother of the Italian politician Walter Veltroni, former Mayor of Rome and former president of the Democratic Party.

== Sources ==
- Ivo Jevnikar: Il nonno sloveno di Walter Veltroni
- Robert G. Weisbord, Wallace P. Sillanpoa (1992). The Chief Rabbi, the Pope, and the Holocaust. Transaction Publishers. ISBN 0-88738-416-1.
- Walter Veltroni, La bella politica (Milano: Rizzoli, 1996).
