= Sveti Gregor, Ribnica =

Sveti Gregor
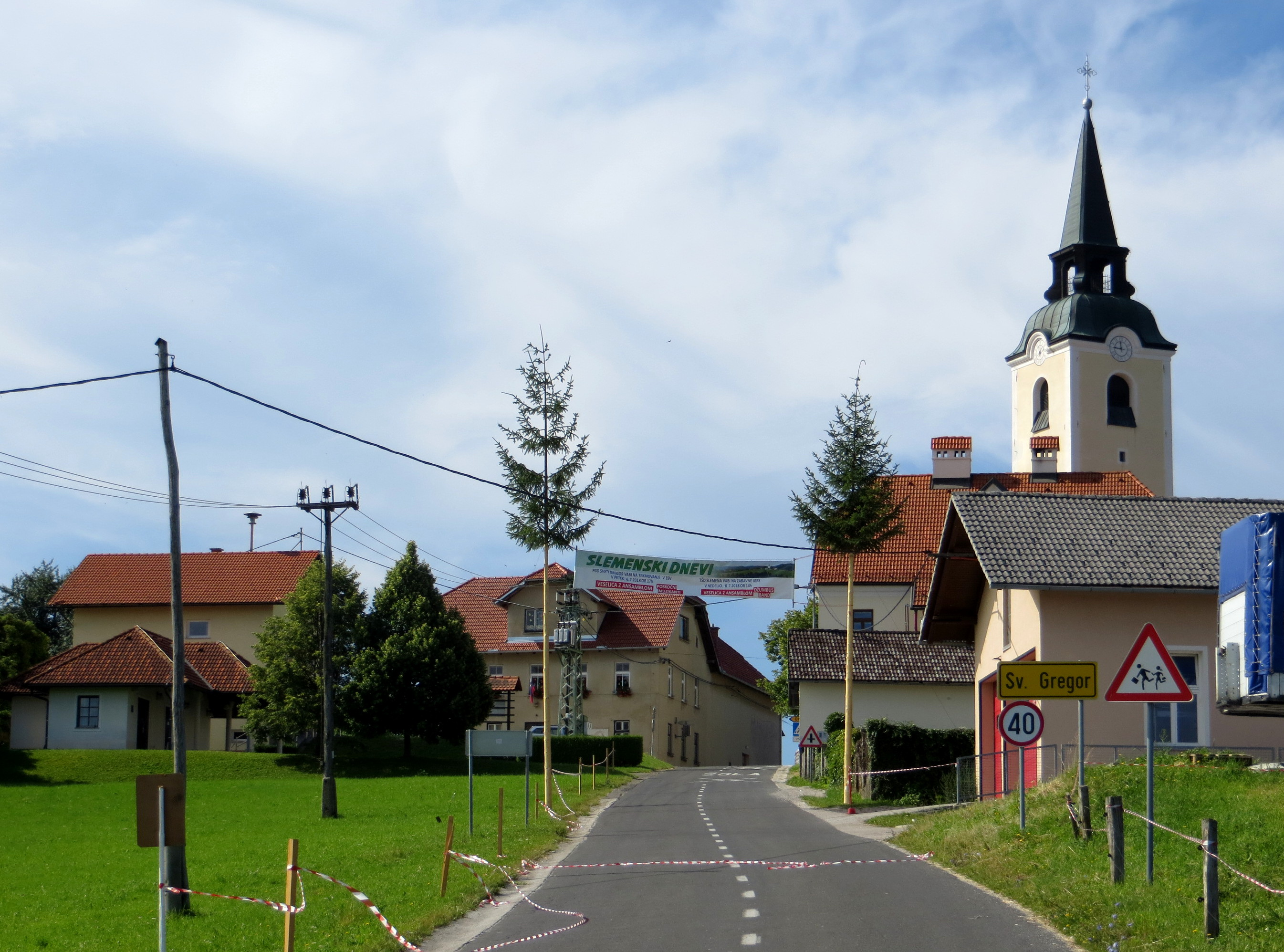

- Location in Slovenia
- Coordinates: 45°47′4.44″N 14°38′26.81″E
- Country: Slovenia
- Traditional region: Lower Carniola
- Statistical region: Southeast Slovenia
- Municipality: Ribnica

Area
  - Total: 0.38 km^{2} (0.15 sq mi)
- Elevation: 735.5 m (2,413 ft)

Population (2002)
  - Total: 45
- Postal code: 1316

Sveti Gregor (pronounced [ˈsʋeːti ˈɡɾɛːɡɔɾ]; German: Sankt Gregor) is a village in the hills north of Sodražica in southern Slovenia. It belongs to the Municipality of Ribnica. The area is part of the traditional region of Lower Carniola and is now included in the Southeast Slovenia Statistical Region.

== Church ==
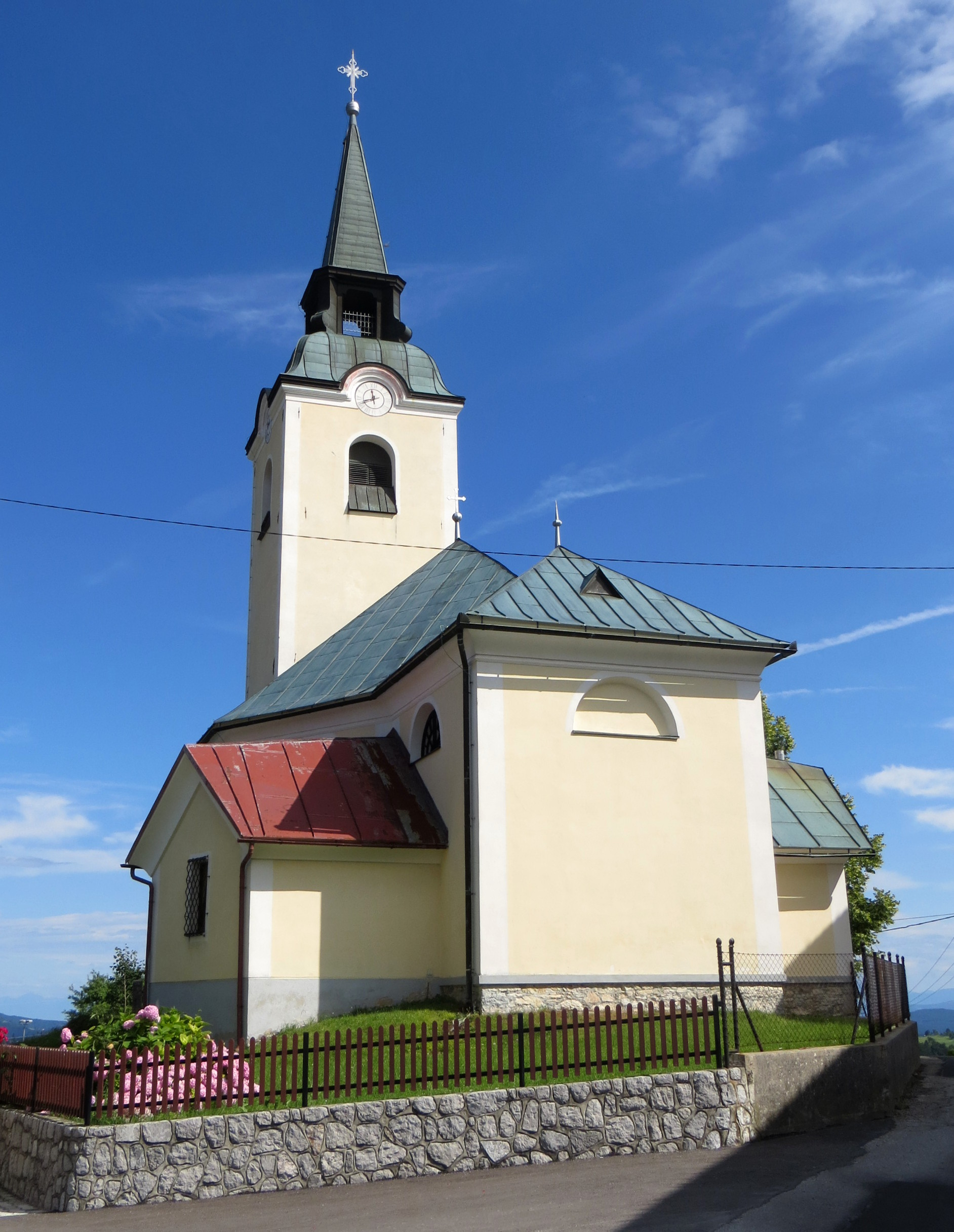
View from south

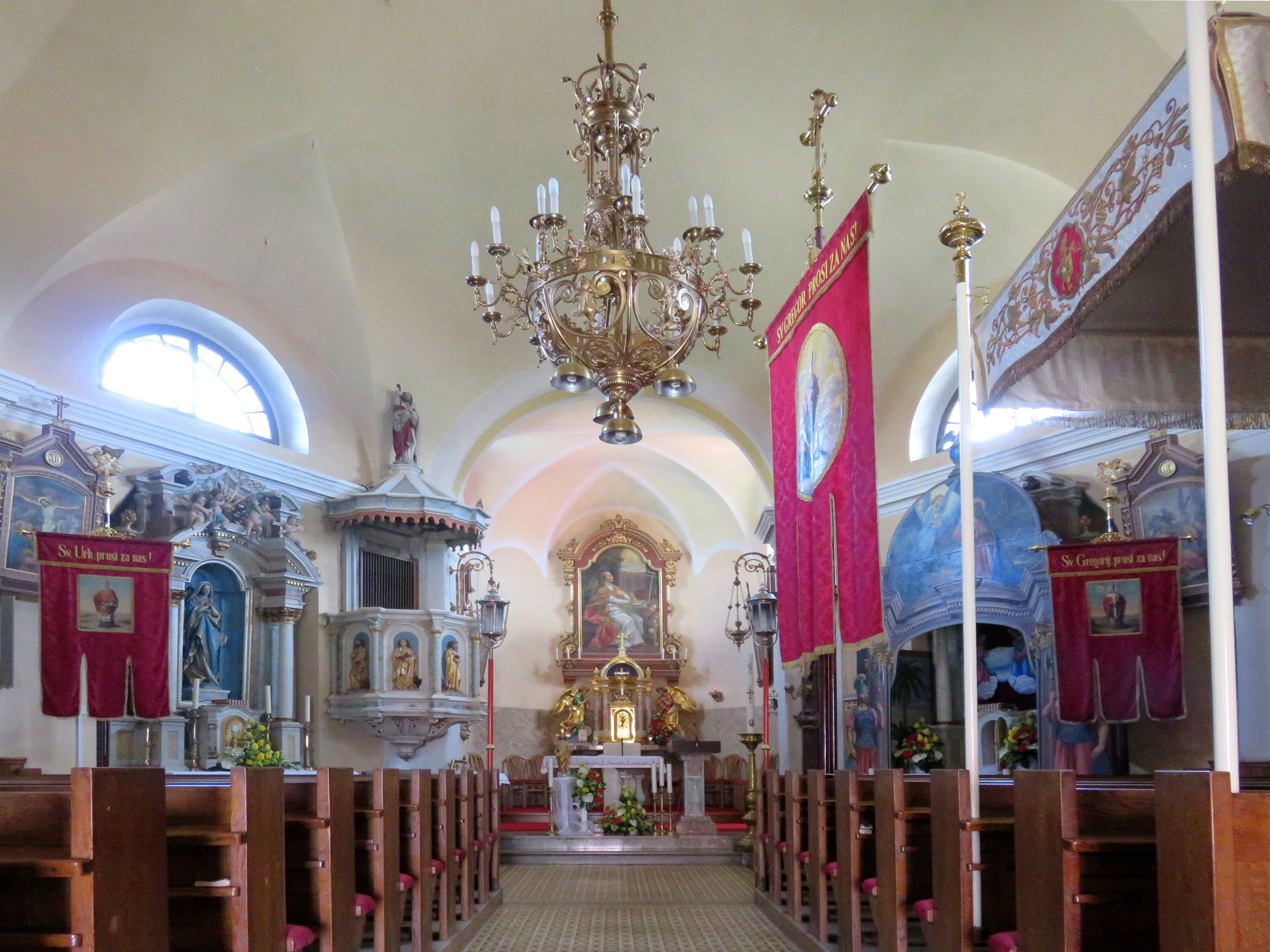
Interior

Saint Gregory's Church

The parish church in the settlement, from which the village also gets its name, is dedicated to Saint Gregory and belongs to the Roman Catholic Archdiocese of Ljubljana. It was built in 1826 on the site of an earlier church.

== Notable people ==
The Slovene politician, journalist, and author Janez Evangelist Krek was born in the village in 1865. The house where he was born stood at the site of what is now the fire station.
