= Janez Evangelist Krek =

Slovenian politician (1865–1917)

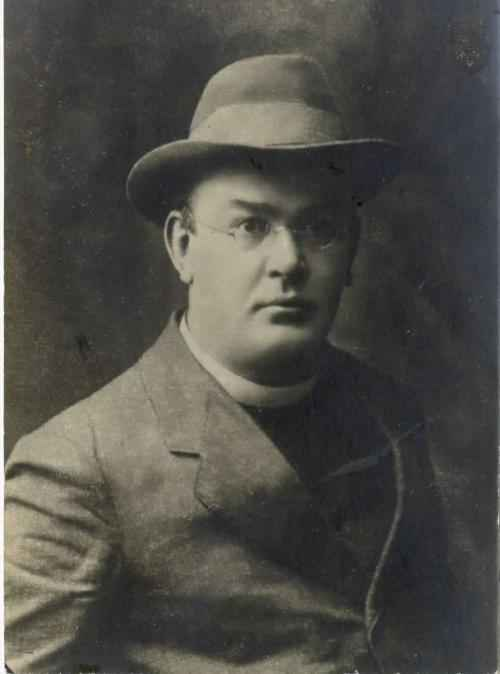
- Krek in 1910
- Born: 27 September 1865; Sveti Gregor, Slovenia
- Died: 8 October 1917 (aged 52); Slovenia
- Occupations: journalist, author, politician, priest

Janez Evangelist Krek (27 November 1865 – 8 October 1917) was a Slovene Christian Socialist politician, priest, journalist, and author.

== Life and career ==
He was born and baptized Johann Krek in a peasant family in the village of Sveti Gregor (now in the Municipality of Ribnica in Lower Carniola), in what was then the Austrian Empire. His father died when he was a child. After finishing the state gymnasium in Ljubljana in 1884, he entered the Roman Catholic seminary. He was consecrated priest in 1888, and sent to the theological faculty in Vienna by Bishop Jakob Missia. There, he became acquainted with the new Austrian Christian Social movement of the charismatic politician Karl Lueger. Krek graduated in 1892, and was appointed vicar in the Ljubljana Cathedral. From 1895, he taught philosophy at the Catholic seminary.

He soon became involved in politics within the conservative Slovene People's Party. In 1897, he was elected representative to the Austrian Parliament. In 1900, he decided not to run for a second turn. In 1901, he was elected representative in the Provincial Diet of Carniola.

Already in his early Viennese years, Krek had published critical articles against liberalism. Influenced by the ultra-conservative thought of the Roman Catholic bishop of Krk Anton Mahnič, and by the encyclic Rerum novarum, he attacked the liberal economic system as being anti-social and anti-democratic. Between 1898 and 1907, Krek organized several peasant and worker's co-operatives, and transformed the Slovene People's Party from a conservative clerical party into a mass political movement propagating social emancipation on the basis of Catholic political ideology. As the result such mobilization, the People's Party won by landslide the first elections by general suffrage in Austria in 1907, gaining 20 of the 24 Slovene seats in the Austrian Parliament. Krek was among those elected.

In the parliament, Krek proved to be a powerful orator. He proposed several measures for social welfare, but was frequently blocked by the conservative leadership of his own party, led by the powerful Ivan Šušteršič. In 1909, Krek founded the Yugoslav Labor Association (Jugoslovanska strokovna zveza), which would become and remain the biggest trade union in the Slovene Lands until its dissolution in 1941.

Already in the late 1890s, Krek convinced the Slovene People's Party to seek a close alliance with Ante Starčević's Croatian Party of Rights. Krek's aim was to establish a unified state of South Slavs within Austria-Hungary on the basis of the tradition of Croatian State Right. Krek was a convinced supporter of the idea of the unity of South Slav peoples, and many later commentators, including the historian Lojze Ude and Communist politician Boris Kidrič, reproached him with "Slavic romanticism" and "Yugoslav nationalism".

In 1917, Krek became the proposer and leader of the so-called May Declaration (Slovene: Majniška deklaracija), which proposed the creation of a state of South Slavs under Habsburg rule. The declaration developed in a mass movement in the Slovene Lands, and Krek traveled extensively to Dalmatia and Bosnia and Herzegovina in order to popularize the movement there, too. He died of exhaustion when returning from one of his travels. His ideals were realized only after his death and the collapse of Austria-Hungary, first with the creation of the State of Slovenes, Croats and Serbs and then the Kingdom of Serbs, Croats and Slovenes.

He was buried in Žale Cemetery in Ljubljana.
