= Biserjane =

- Location in Slovenia
- Coordinates: 46°34′21.59″N 16°2′1.15″E
- Country: Slovenia
- Traditional region: Styria
- Statistical region: Mura
- Municipality: Sveti Jurij ob Ščavnici

Area
  - Total: 1.41 km^{2} (0.54 sq mi)
- Elevation: 196 m (643 ft)

Population (2002)
  - Total: 92

Biserjane (pronounced [bisɛˈɾjaːnɛ]) is a settlement in the Municipality of Sveti Jurij ob Ščavnici in northeastern Slovenia. The area is part of the traditional region of Styria. It is now included with the rest of the municipality in the Mura Statistical Region.

There is archaeological evidence in the area of Late Bronze Age and Roman settlement.

== Notable people ==
Notable people that were born or lived in Biserjane include:

- Anton Korošec (1872–1940), politician
