= Slovene Covenant =

Coat of arms of the Slovene Covenant

The Slovene Covenant (Slovenska zaveza) was an underground anti-communist organisation formed in Slovenia in April 1942 by a number of non-communist political parties after the killing of Avgust Praprotnik (1891–1942) by operatives from the Security and Intelligence Service (Varnostnoobveščevalna služba, VOS), a forerunner of the Yugoslav secret police. It "adopted a political programme that strongly echoed the political positions of the OF" (Osvobodilna fronta). In 1943 anti-communist forces including the Slovene Covenant engaged in armed conflict against Partisan forces in the country and were defeated.

== See also ==
- Miha Krek, Slovenian lawyer
- Marko Natlačen, Slovenian politician and jurist
- Leon Rupnik, Slovene general and Nazi collaborator
- Liberalism in Slovenia
- Slovenes
- Slovene Partisans, communist resistance movement
- Slovene Lands in World War II
