= Slovene People's Party (historical) =

Slovene People's Party Slovenska ljudska stranka
- Founder: Anton Korošec
- Founded: 1892
- Banned: 1945
- Succeeded by: Slovene Christian Democrats (1989); Slovenian People's Party (2000)
- Ideology: Conservatism; Slovenian autonomy Christian democracy Slovenian nationalism
- European affiliation: White International (attendee)

The Slovene People's Party (Slovene: Slovenska ljudska stranka, pronounced [slɔˈʋèːnska ˈljúːtska ˈstráːŋka], Slovene abbreviation SLS) was a Slovenian political party in the 19th and 20th centuries, active in the Austro-Hungarian Monarchy and in the Kingdom of Yugoslavia. Between 1907 and 1941, it was the largest and arguably the most influential political party in the Slovene Lands. It was dissolved by the Yugoslav Communist authorities in 1945, but continued to be active in exile until 1992, when it merged with the Slovene Christian Democrats. The contemporary Slovene People's Party, founded in 1988, was named after it.

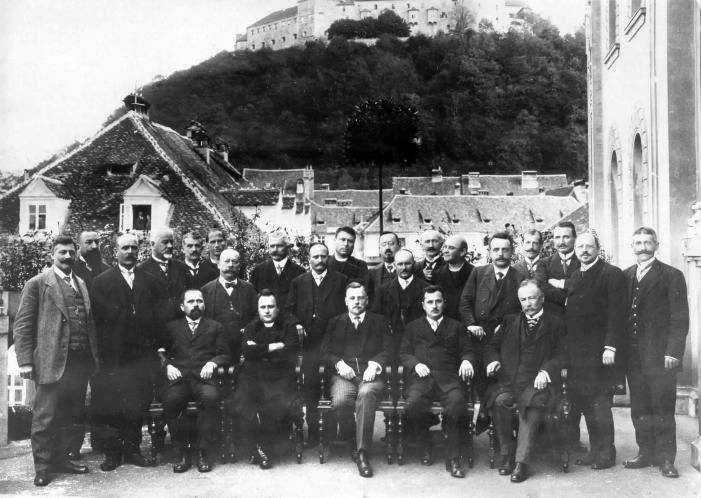
Representatives of the Slovene People's Party in the Provincial Diet of Carniola shortly before World War I. The party's president Ivan Šušteršič sits in the middle.

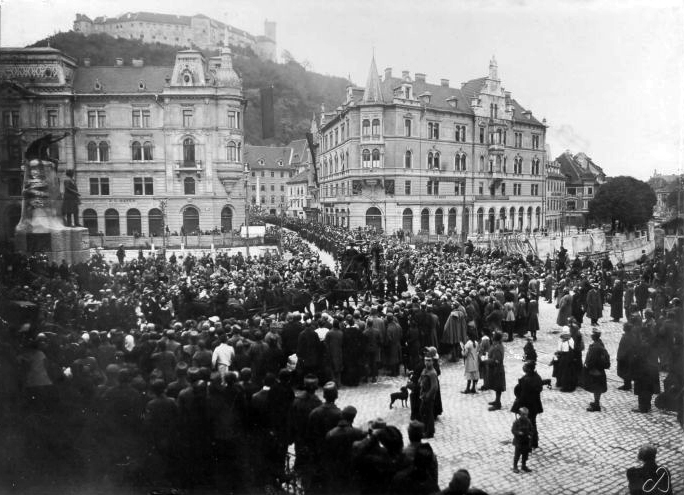
The funeral of Janez Evangelist Krek in Ljubljana in 1917 turned into a manifestation of the Party popular support.

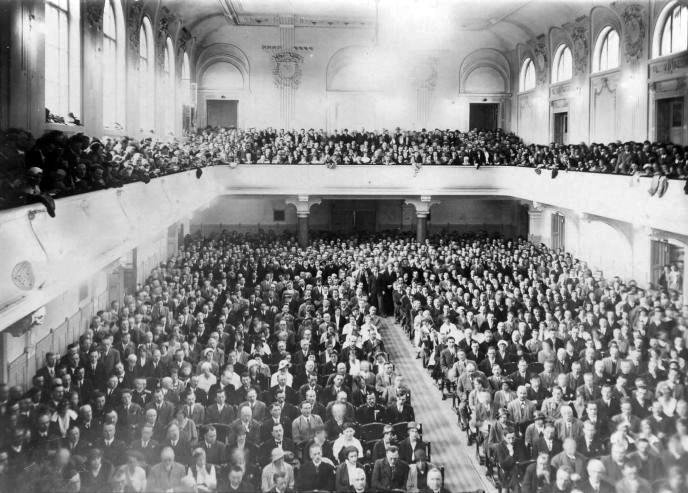
Cultural meeting organized by the Slovene People's Party during the January 6th Dictatorship, when the SLS became the main opposition to the authoritarian regime of Alexander I of Yugoslavia in Slovenia.

== From the establishment of the party to the collapse of Austria Hungary ==
The Slovene People’s Party was founded under the name Catholic National Party (Katoliška narodna stranka) in 1892 in Ljubljana with the aim of working in the Carniola region. On 27 November 1905, the ruling body of the party adopted a motion changing the name to Slovene People’s Party. Under the influence of Ivan Šusteršič, Evgen Lampe and Janez Evangelist Krek, the party evolved in the early years of the new century from a conservative party into a Christian Social party, based on mass support. The main plank of its programme was support for workers and farmers. Šusteršič, Krek and their colleagues worked to establish a broad network of cooperatives and lenders, which offered credit on favourable terms and assistance. By 1907, they had already established 433 collectives.

In October 1909, the Carniolan SLS joined with related Catholic organisations from Lower Styria, Carinthia, Gorizia and Gradisca and Istria. It was renamed to Pan-Slovene People's Party (Vseslovenska ljudska stranka, VLS) and became the leading and most powerful Slovene political party. In the last elections for the Reichsrat in the Habsburg Monarchy, the SLS won some 87% of all Slovene mandates. Until World War I, the party campaigned for greater autonomy for Slovene within the Habsburg Monarchy.

== In Yugoslavia ==
In 1917, the SLS had a decisive influence on the adoption of the May Declaration, in which members of the Reichsrat called for the union of South Slav lands under the Habsburg crown. Anton Korošec became the leader of the party in the same year. Even before the conclusion of negotiations on the fate of the Slovenes in the Habsburg Monarchy, Anton Korošec had supported the secession of the Slovenes and Croats from the Habsburg Monarchy and the creation of the State of Slovenes, Croats and Serbs. In 1920, the party reverted to its original name 'Slovene People's Party'.

In the general Yugoslav elections of November 1920, the SLS lost its absolute majority in Slovenia for the first time since 1907. From 87% of all Slovenian mandates before the elections, it fell to just 36% of the popular vote after the elections. Thereafter, the party gradually shifted its orientation: it quit the Yugoslav government and began to agitate for greater autonomy for Slovenes within the Kingdom of Serbs, Croats and Slovenes. In this period, the SLS formed the Federalist Bloc together with the Croatian Republican Peasant Party, Yugoslav Muslim Organization, and other minor parties. The coalition was however too heterogeneous, and was held together by a single issue: the wish of decentralization of the Yugoslav State. In 1925, the Federalist Bloc fell apart when the Croatian Peasant Party, led by Stjepan Radić, entered a compromise with the centralist government and formed a ruling coalition with the People's Radical Party, the main political representative of Yugoslavia's Serbian establishment.

Following the breakdown of the Federalist Bloc, the SLS was forced to redefine its tactics. From a federalist program, it turned back on the defence of purely Slovenian interests, trying to form a compromise with the centralist establishment. After multiple unsuccessful attempts, the SLS was included in the Yugoslav government in 1927, when it formed a coalition with the Serbian People's Radical Party. The roles were now reversed, with the Slovene People's Party in government, and its former Croatian agrarian allies in opposition.

After the assassination of Stjepan Radić in 1928, which was followed by the resignation of the Prime Minister Velja Vukićević, the leader of the SLS Anton Korošec became Prime Minister of Yugoslavia. Korošec however only held the premiership for less than one year, until King Alexander declared a dictatorship in January 1929. Following the royal coup d'état, all parties, including the SLS, were forced to stop their activities. After some initial opposition to the dictatorship, the leadership of the Slovene People's Party started to collaborate with the government, in the hope to alleviate possible negative consequences for Slovenia. By 1931, however, the relations between the SLS and the royalist administration worsened. Because of SLS's demands for the reintroduction of free suffrage, for greater autonomy for Slovenia and for a federal constitution for the Kingdom of Yugoslavia, several members of the SLS were arrested. Korošec was placed under house arrest.

After King Alexander’s death in 1934, the SLS started working for a gradual re-approachment to the central government. In 1935, the SLS entered a new Yugoslav government together with Serb radicals and Bosnian Muslims. The three groups formed a unified coalition party, called Yugoslav Radical Community, led by the Prime Minister Milan Stojadinović. Nevertheless, the SLS maintained its independent organization within the new party.

In the years prior to World War Two, the SLS started facing opposition from its own files. Its Christian Socialist members started fleeing massively the party, and many centrist, Christian Democratic and autonomist members became alienated from the party's authoritarian turn. Nevertheless, the party won a landslide victory in the last general elections before World War Two in 1939. The impressive and unprecedented result (over 78% of the vote) was however achieved with a low voting outcome (only around 60% of those entitled to vote showed up in the polls) and in a controlled a non-secret elections (the voters had to publicly express their vote).

== World War II ==
Despite questions of fairness in the elections, it is beyond doubt that before the outbreak of World War II, the SLS was still the largest and most powerful political party in Slovenia, enjoying the support of vast strata of the population. When Anton Korošec died in 1940, the party was left without any real leadership, because there was no charismatic personality that could effectively take on the role of leading the party. The new president of the SLS was Father Franc Kulovec, a Roman Catholic cleric, but he was killed in 1941 during the German bombardment of Belgrade. At the start of the war, the SLS had two leaders: Miha Krek and Marko Natlačen. After internal discussions, it was decided that Krek should leave with members of the Yugoslav government for London, while Natlačen, who was also governor (ban) of the Drava Banovina, should lead the party during the occupation. On 6 April 1941, in light of the combined German, Italian and Hungarian attacks on Slovenian territory, then still part of the Kingdom of Yugoslavia, SLS suggested the holding of a national council with the goal of achieving Slovenian autonomy under one sole occupier. The Slovenian parliamentary parties chose Marko Natlačen, as the head of the most powerful political party, to lead the council, but in 1942, an officer in the secret services working for the Communist Party of Slovenia assassinated Natlačen, leaving the SLS without a leader. Natlačen was replaced by various other politicians, but they did not have the same political convictions and there were numerous divisions within the party. During the civil war that took place during World War II, the SLS began to lose support and its former political influence because many of its politicians collaborated with the occupying forces. Despite his calls from London to stop collaborating, Miha Krek was not able to re-establish control over the Slovene People's Party.

== After World War II ==
After World War II, the Communist Party of Yugoslavia took power and banned all other political parties, including the SLS. The party’s leading politicians emigrated to the US and to Argentina. Miha Krek left for Washington, D.C. but remained president of the SLS. The party, which could not operate in Slovenia, was accepted into the League of Central European Christian Democrat Parties in 1952. Following Krek’s death in 1969, Miloš Stare, who lived in Argentina, was elected president of the SLS. Following his death in 1984, Marko Kremžar took over the helm of the party.

The party returned to Slovenia in 1999. It was in that year that the party merged with the Slovene Christian Democrats (SKD), led by Lojze Peterle, and Marko Kremžar was elected its vice-president. In the year 2000, the Slovene Christian Democrats merged with the modern Slovene People's Party, which had been founded in 1988; the modern Slovene People's Party thus became the official successor of the historical SLS.

== Prominent members ==
=== Before World War One ===
- Ivan Šušteršič
- Janez Evangelist Krek
- Evgen Lampe
- Fran Šuklje
- Karel Klun

=== After World War One ===
- Anton Korošec
- Andrej Gosar
- Izidor Cankar
- Fran Kulovec
- Franc Snoj
- Alojzij Kuhar
- Marko Natlačen
- Juro Adlešič
- Ivan Ahčin
- Miloš Stare
- Miha Krek
- Ciril Žebot
- Engelbert Besednjak
- Virgil Šček
- Janko Kralj
