= Miha Krek =

Slovenian lawyer and conservative politician

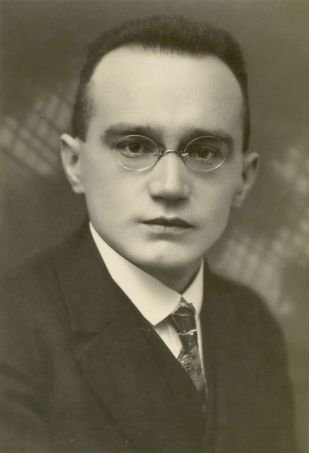
- Miha Krek in the 1930s

Minister of Education
- In office 26 August 1939 – 27 March 1941
- Prime Minister: Dragiša Cvetković
- Preceded by: Stevan Ćirić
- Succeeded by: Miloš Trifunović

Personal details
- Born: 28 September 1897 Leskovica, Austria-Hungary
- Died: 18 November 1969 (aged 72) Cleveland, United States
- Party: Slovene People's Party

Miha Krek (28 September 1897 – 18 November 1969) was a Slovenian lawyer and conservative politician. Between 1941 and 1969, he was the informal leader of the Slovenian anti-Communist emigration.

Born in the Upper Carniolan village of Leskovica, he studied at the St. Stanislaus Institute in Šentvid near Ljubljana. During World War I, he was drafted in the Austro-Hungarian Army. After the war, he studied law at the universities of Zagreb and Ljubljana, where he obtained his PhD in 1930. Until 1935, he had a law firm in Ljubljana.

Krek joined the conservative Catholic Slovene People's Party in 1921. Initially, he served in the Party's auxiliary cultural associations. He also served as the president of the Slovenian section of the Catholic Action, and chief editor of the main conservative newspaper Slovenec. During the royal dictatorship of king Alexander I of Yugoslavia, he served as vice-president of the party.

In 1936, he became minister without portfolio in the cabinet of Milan Stojadinović. In 1938, he was elected Member of the Parliament of the Kingdom of Yugoslavia on the list of the Yugoslav Radical Community, of which the Slovene People's Party was part between 1935 and 1941. In December of the same year, he became Minister of Constructions. He maintained the ministry in the government of Dragiša Cvetković, formed after Stojadinović's downfall in February 1939. In 1940, he was named Minister of Education in the Cvetković-Maček coalition government. After the death of Anton Korošec, Krek became General Secretary of the Yugoslav Radical Community in the Drava Banovina, and thus the second most influential politician in the Slovene People's Party after Fran Kulovec.

After the Axis invasion of Yugoslavia in April 1941, Krek emigrated to Palestine and then to London, as a member of the Yugoslav Government in Exile, led by Dušan Simović. Following the death of Fran Kulovec in the Belgrade air raid, Krek became the exile leader of the Slovene People's Party, while Marko Natlačen became the party's leader in occupied Slovenia.

Together with fellow party member Franc Snoj, Krek became the Slovene representative the Yugoslav exile governments of Slobodan Jovanović and Miloš Trifunović. During this time, he published several manifestos urging the Slovenes, without much success, to join the Chetnik resistance movement of Draža Mihailović. He also maintained contacts with the Slovene non-Communist underground resistance, known as the Slovene Covenant.

In 1944, he opposed the Tito-Šubašić Agreement, with which the Yugoslav government in exile recognized the Yugoslav partisans. The same year, he moved to Rome, where he organized the Slovenian National Council Abroad, which was opposed to the Communist-led Liberation Front of the Slovenian People. In May and June 1945, he tried unsuccessfully to prevent the re-patriation of the Slovene Home Guard to Yugoslavia. In September of the same year, he co-authored a manifesto titled "Tito's Government is Introducing Totalitarianism", together with the leader of the Socialist Party of Yugoslavia Živko Topalović and the leader of the Independent Democratic Party Adam Pribićević. In 1946, Krek was tried in absentia by the new Yugoslav Communist authorities on charges of high treason and war crimes and sentenced to 15 years of prison.

He stayed in Rome until 1947, where he organized, together with Ivan Ahčin, a network that helped in the emigration of tens and thousands of Slovenes, especially to Argentina and to the United States. In 1947, he moved to the United States himself, and was officially elected as president of the Slovene People's Party in Exile. During 1949, he assisted Reuben H. Markham, who edited "Communists Crush Churches in Eastern Europe," with material on Yugoslavia. He died in Cleveland, Ohio, and was succeeded by Miloš Stare as the President of the Slovene People's Party.

== See also ==
- Ivan Ahčin
- Alojzij Kuhar
- Izidor Cankar
- Boris Furlan
