= Ivan Ahčin =

Slovene sociologist, journalist, author and politician

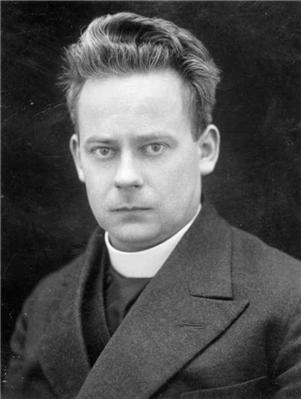
- Born: Janez Ahčin; March 9, 1897; Spodnje Domžale, Duchy of Carniola, Austria-Hungary
- Died: February 14, 1960 (aged 62); Buenos Aires, Argentina
- Occupations: Sociologist, journalist

Ivan Ahčin (March 9, 1897 – February 14, 1960) was a Slovene sociologist, journalist, author, and politician.

Ahčin was born in Spodnje Domžale (now part of Domžale) and baptized Janez Ahčin. He studied theology at the University of Ljubljana, where he graduated in 1925. He later worked as a professor of sociology at the University of Ljubljana. Between 1929 and 1941 he was also the editor of the newspaper Slovenec, the official organ of the Slovene People's Party and one of the two most influential newspapers in Slovenia. He was one of the closest associates of the conservative Slovene politician Anton Korošec.

After the Axis invasion of Yugoslavia in April 1941, Ahčin cooperated with Marko Natlačen, former governor of the Drava Banovina in the Kingdom of Yugoslavia, who advocated collaboration with the Italian administration of the Province of Ljubljana. After the assassination of Natlačen by Slovene communist agents in October 1942, Ahčin emigrated to Rome, from where he contacted the Yugoslav government in exile in London and became one of the main advisors of the exiled Slovene conservative politician Miha Krek. In Rome, he also established contacts with Janko Kralj, a Slovene exile from Gorizia: the two helped many anti-Nazis escape Nazi persecution between 1943 and 1944, when Rome was under German occupation.

After 1945, Ahčin moved to Argentina, where he worked as a professor at the University of Buenos Aires's Faculty of Theology. He died of colon cancer in Buenos Aires.

In 1999, two historians from Ljubljana, Bojan Godeša and Ervin Dolenc, published Ahčin's memoirs of the period when he worked with Anton Korošec. The book, entitled Izgubljeni spomin na Antona Korošca (The Lost Memory of Anton Korošec), was published by Nova Revija, and it reopened the discussion of the role of Anton Korošec in Slovene history.

== Books ==
- Komunizem: največja nevarnost naše dobe (Communism: The Greatest Danger of Our Time, 1939)
- Prostozidarstvo (Freemasonry, 1941)
- Sociologija I (Sociology I, textbook, 1953)
- Sociologija II (Sociology II, textbook, 1955)
- Socialna ekonomija (Social Economy, textbook, 1958)
