= Ivan Šusteršič =

Slovenian lawyer and politician

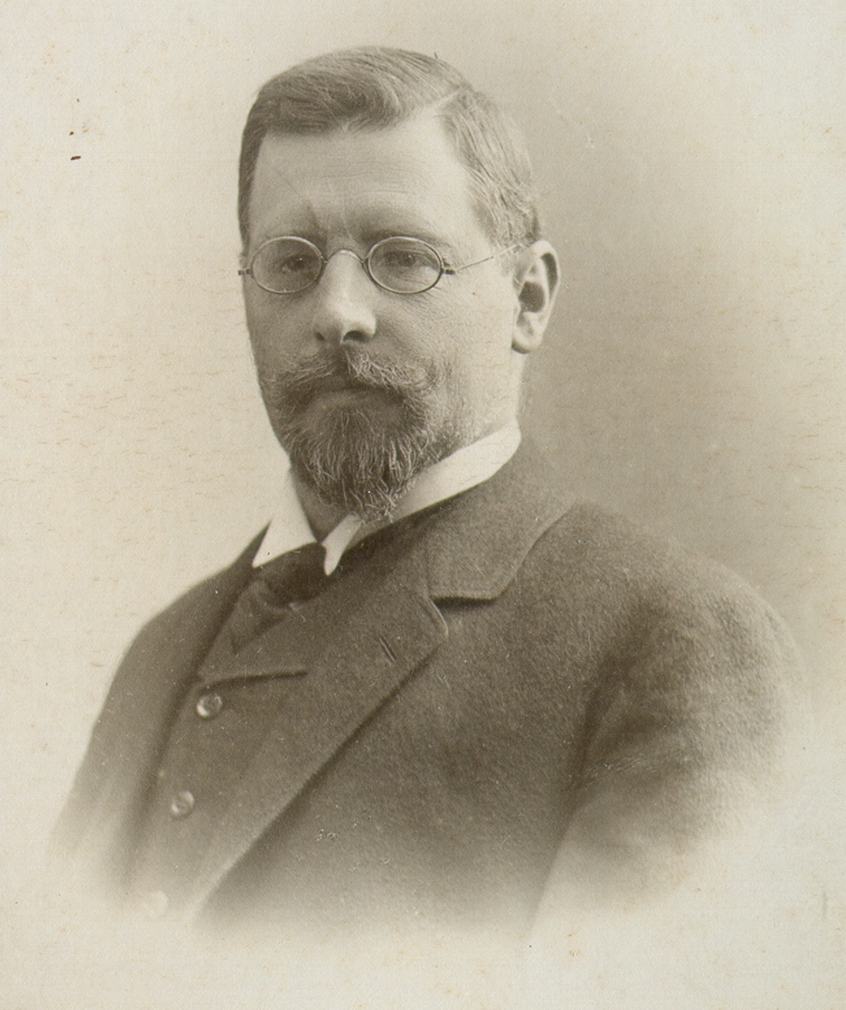
Ivan Šusteršič

Ivan Šusteršič, also spelled Šušteršič (29 May 1863 – 7 October 1925) was a Slovenian lawyer and politician.

He was born in the Carniolan town of Ribnica, then part of the Austrian Empire (now in Slovenia). His brother was the Austro-Hungarian Rear Admiral Alois Schusterschitz (Alojz Šusteršič), who participated in the Boxer war of 1900 and in the Peace Treaty negotiations in Paris in 1919. After finishing grammar school in 1881, he enrolled in the University of Vienna, where he studied law. In 1890, he was among the co-founders of the Catholic Political Society in Ljubljana and in 1896, he was elected to the Austrian Parliament. From 1899, he was a member of the Catholic National Party, later renamed to Slovene People's Party. In the Parliament, he served as president of the Slovene Parliamentary Club from 1907. Between 1909 and 1911, he was president of the largest opposition coalition, the Slovene Union, and between 1912 and 1914, he was president of the Croat and Slovene Parliamentary Club. In 1912, he was named Governor of the Duchy of Carniola. In 1914 Šusteršič called for violence against Serbs in the aftermath of the Anti-Serb riots in Sarajevo.

He remained Governor of the Duchy of Carniola until October 1918, when he left for Switzerland after a dispute in the Slovene People’s Party: in contrast to party's mainstream, he rejected the creation of an independent State of Slovenes, Croats and Serbs, favoring the federalization of the Austro-Hungarian Empire, instead.

He returned to Yugoslavia in December 1922, founding the National People's Party in elections in 1923. He was defeated, gaining less than 2% of the vote, and thereafter withdrew from politics.

== Sources ==
- Grdina, Igor. "Nekaj opazk o Šušteršičevi politiki pred in med prvo svetovno vojno". Zgodovinski časopis 53 (1999). 351-365.
- Pleterski, Janko. Dr. Ivan Šušteršič, 1863-1925 : Pot prvaka slovenskega političnega katolicizma. Ljubljana, 1998.
- Rahten, Andrej. "Zadnji slovenski avstrijakant : Prispevek k politični biografiji dr. Ivana Šusteršiča". Zgodovinski časopis 53 (1999). 195-208.
- Mitrović, Andrej (2007). Serbia's Great War, 1914–1918. Purdue University Press. ISBN 978-1-55753-477-4.
- Šušteršič, Ivan. Moj odgovor. Ljubljana, 1922.
