= Anton Korošec =

Yugoslav politician (1872–1940)

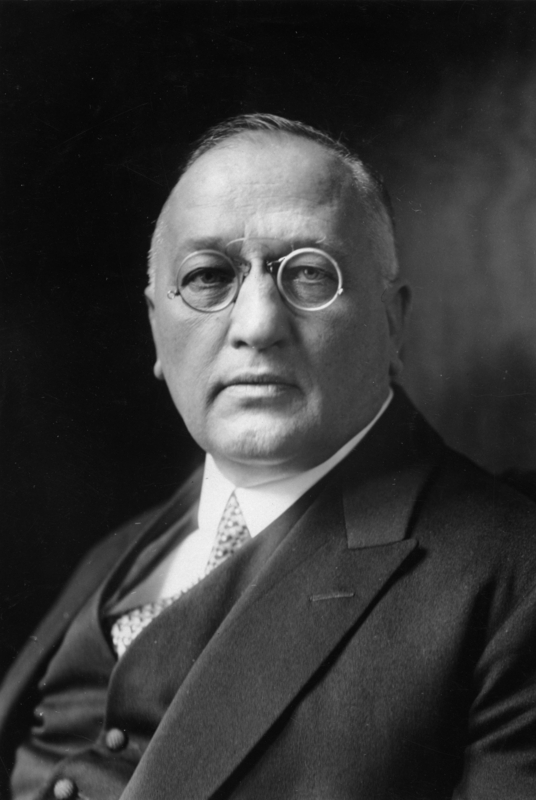

7th Prime Minister of Yugoslavia
- In office 28 July 1928 – 7 January 1929
- Monarch: Alexander I
- Preceded by: Velimir Vukićević
- Succeeded by: Petar Živković

President of the National Council of the State of Slovenes, Croats and Serbs
- In office 29 October 1918 – 1 December 1918
- Deputy: Ante Pavelić Svetozar Pribićević
- Preceded by: Office established
- Succeeded by: Office abolished

Personal details
- Born: 12 May 1872 Biserjane, Styria, Austria-Hungary (now Slovenia)
- Died: 14 December 1940 (aged 68) Belgrade, Yugoslavia (now Serbia)
- Citizenship: Yugoslav
- Party: Slovene People's Party

Anton Korošec (Slovene pronunciation: [anˈtóːŋ kɔˈɾóːʃəts], Serbo-Croatian: [ǎntoːŋ korǒʃets]; 12 May 1872 – 14 December 1940) was a Slovene Yugoslav politician, a prominent member of the conservative People's Party, a Roman Catholic priest and a noted orator.

== Early life ==
Korošec was born in Biserjane (then Duchy of Styria, Austria-Hungary, now part of Slovenia) and went to school in Ptuj and in Maribor. He studied theology and was ordained as a priest in 1895. He completed his education with a doctorate in theology from the University of Graz in 1905. He was friends with Janez Evangelist Krek and adopted his political views.

== Political career ==
In 1907, Korošec was elected to the Reichsrat as a member of the Slovenian People's Party, where, as president of the Yugoslav Club, he read out the May Declaration, which called for all South Slavs to be unified in one state unit within the Austro-Hungarian monarchy. Following the break-up of Austria-Hungary, the National Council of Slovenes, Croats and Serbs, of which Korošec was the president, declared the creation of the State of Slovenes, Croats and Serbs on 29 October 1918. Earlier, Korošec and Nikola Pašić had agreed on the terms of the Geneva Declaration, in which the Kingdom of Serbia recognized the equal rights of the different components of such a state should it join with it in a confederation. From the very beginning however, Serbs favoured central control and the subsequent Kingdom of Serbs, Croats and Slovenes was a unitary monarchy.

Korošec was vice-president in the first government of the Kingdom of Serbs, Croats and Slovenes in 1918. As the leader of the Slovenian People's Party he later collaborated in two right-leaning governments. Despite its defeat in 1920, the Slovenian People's Party was again victorious in Slovenia in 1924 and Korošec was chosen to be vice-president of the government. In 1924 and 1927, he was also minister for the interior. Korošec opposed the adoption of the Vidovdan Constitution and campaigned for greater autonomy for Slovenes within the Kingdom of Serbs, Croats and Slovenes until the Slovenian People's Party joined with Serbian radicals to form a centralist government and the idea was sidelined. Following Stjepan Radić’s assassination in 1928, in order to ensure more peace between ethnic groups the king called Korošec to lead the first government of Yugoslavia without a Serbian Prime Minister, but the monarch soon dismissed him when the January 6th Dictatorship was proclaimed. Korošec was also a minister in Petar Živković’s government in 1929. He tried to resolve the crisis in the country by democratic means, but the government fell in 1930 under pressure from Slovenia.

In opposition, Korošec drew up the Slovenian Declaration (Slovenska deklaracija) which called for a new multinational union of Slovenes, Croats and Serbs. This proposal also seemed attractive to Slovenians living in the Slovenian Littoral and Carinthia, which bordered on the existing state. Korošec was exiled to the island of Hvar in 1933. The Slovenian People's Party subsequently boycotted the 1935 parliamentary elections. Korošec nonetheless was named minister for the interior in Milan Stojadinović's government in the same year. He helped to facilitate an agreement between Dragiša Cvetković and Vladko Maček and was minister for education in their government. While in Stojadinović's Government, Korošec advocated a policy of close relationships with Nazi Germany. As education Minister in the Yugoslav government of Macek-Cvetkovic, in October 1940 Korošec introduced two antisemitic laws. One limited the participation of Jews in the wholesale food industry, while the other put a limit on the number of Jewish students in secondary schools and universities. When other ministers objected to the laws, Korošec insisted that failure to introduce them would endanger relationships with Germany, and the laws were indeed accepted.

Towards the end of his life, he openly spoke out against Freemasonry, Communism as well as Judaism. While serving Interior Minister in the Yugoslav government, Korošec, declared "all Jews, Communists, and Freemasons as traitors, conspirators, and enemies of the State". He also organised the anti-Communist organisation the Sentinel in the Tempest (Straža v viharju).

== Death ==
Korošec died aged 68 in Belgrade (then Kingdom of Yugoslavia, now Republic of Serbia).

Preceded by Velimir Vukićević	Prime Minister of Yugoslavia; 1928–1929	Succeeded by Petar Živković
